= LA General Medical Center station =

Busway station in Los Angeles, California

LA General Medical Center
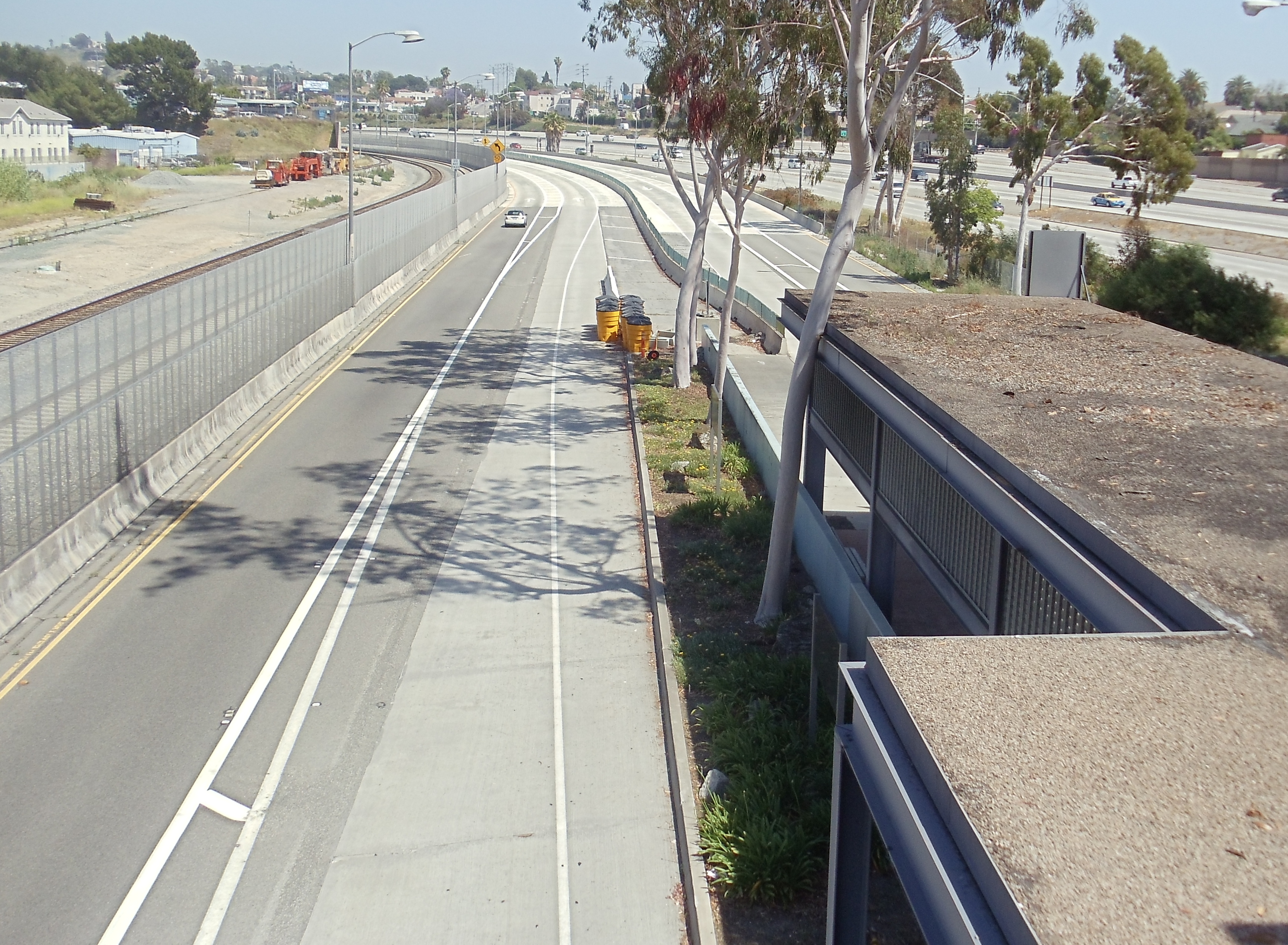
- Station platform, looking east

General information
- Location: 1930 Pomeroy Avenue; Los Angeles, California
- Coordinates: 34°03′20″N 118°12′39″W
- Owner: Los Angeles County Metropolitan Transportation Authority
- Line: See Busway services section
- Platforms: 1 island platform
- Connections: Los Angeles Metro Bus; LADOT DASH

Construction
- Cycle facilities: Racks
- Accessible: Yes

History
- Opened: November 4, 1974
- Former names: LAC+USC Medical Center

Passengers
- FY 2025: 344 (avg. wkdy boardings, J Line)

Services
Preceding station	Metro Busway	Following station
Union Station toward Harbor Gateway or San Pedro	J Line	Cal State LA toward El Monte
Preceding station	Foothill Transit	Following station
Union Station toward Pico	Silver Streak	Cal State LA toward Montclair
Proposed services
Preceding station	Metrolink	Following station
L.A. Union Station Terminus	San Bernardino Line	Cal State L.A. toward San Bernardino or Redlands
Location

LA General Medical Center station is a busway station located in the Boyle Heights neighborhood of Los Angeles, California. It is situated between Union Station and Cal State LA station on the El Monte Busway. The station is served by two bus rapid transit routes: the J Line, operated by Metro and the Silver Streak, operated by Foothill Transit. It is also used by several Metro Express and Foothill Transit bus services, most of which only run during weekday peak periods. The station consists of an island platforms in the center of the El Monte Busway, near its namesake, the Los Angeles General Medical Center. The station was completed on November 4, 1974, and is accessed by a bridge from Pomeroy Avenue between Kingston Avenue and Brittania Street.

The station was named LAC+USC Medical Center until December 10, 2023, when it was changed to reflect the hospital's new name.

Metro has additional plans to add the station as infill to the Metrolink San Bernardino Line. This would involve building a second track and center platform. The cost of this project is estimated between $51 million and $110 million. Currently, westbound Metrolink passengers must exit at the Cal State LA station and take any of the westbound buses one stop to the Medical Center.

== Service ==
=== Hours and frequency ===
J Line buses run 24 hours a day between El Monte, Downtown Los Angeles, and the Harbor Gateway Transit Center, as route 910. Some trips continue to San Pedro between 6 a.m. and 8 p.m. and are signed as Route 950. On weekdays, buses operate every four to eight minutes during peak hours. They operate every 10 minutes in the midday, 20 minutes during evenings, 40 minutes during nights, and every hour overnight. On weekends, buses arrive every 15 minutes most of the day. They operate every 20 minutes during evenings, 40 minutes during nights, and every hour overnight.

Silver Streak buses run 24 hours a day between the Montclair Transit Center, El Monte Station, and Downtown Los Angeles. On weekdays, buses operate every 15 minutes most of the day, every 30 minutes during evenings and every hour overnight.

The station is also used by Los Angeles Metro Bus Express 487 and Express 489 along with Foothill Transit 493, 495, 497, 498, 499 and 699.As of June 26, 2022, the following services are available: Metro route 487 operates all-day, seven days a week; the rest only run during weekday peak periods.

=== Busway services ===
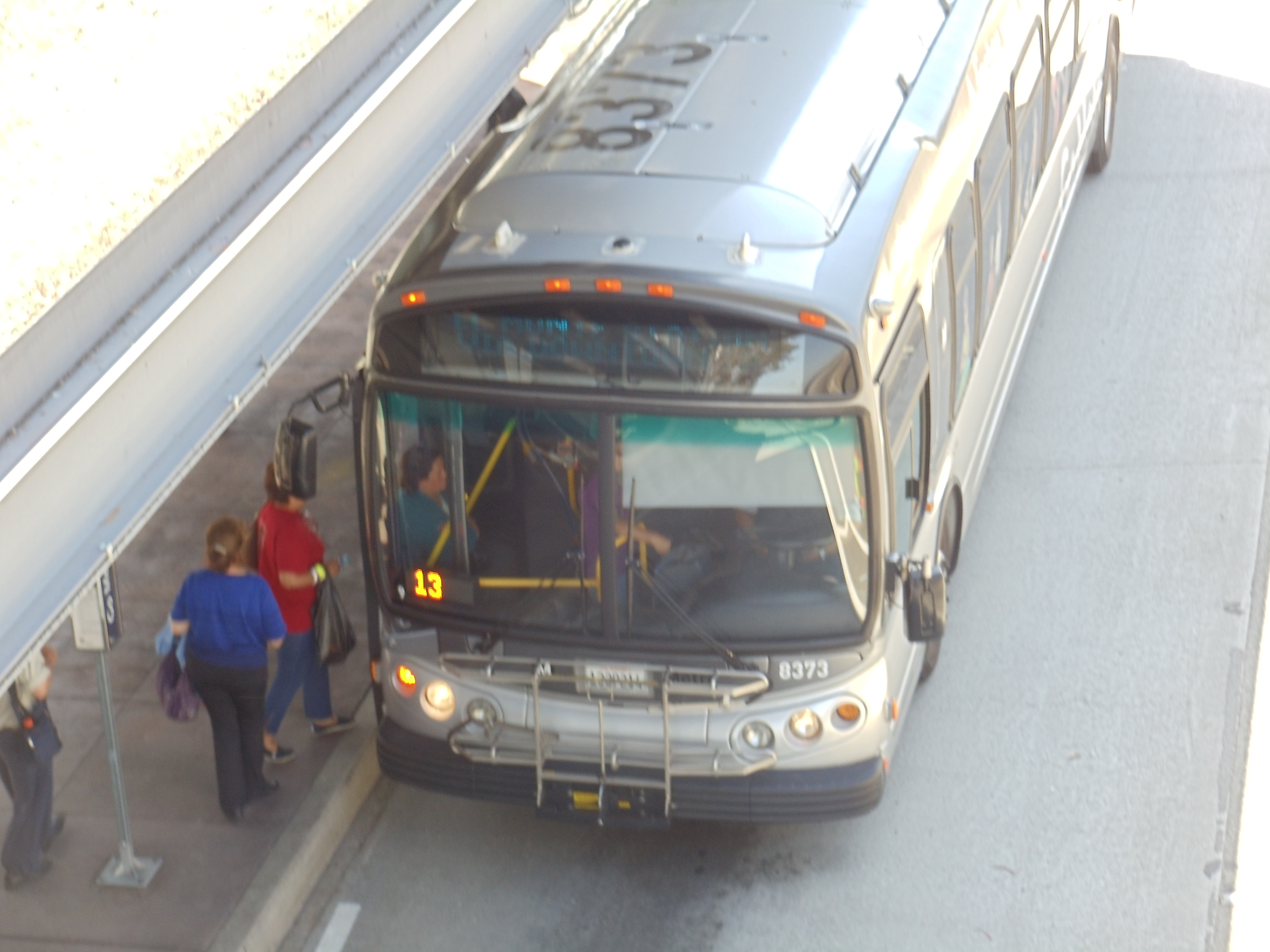
Metro J Line (then Silver Line) bus en route to the El Monte Station stopped at the eastbound platform

Buses stop at the busway platforms located on the lower freeway level:

- Metro J Line: 910, 950
- Los Angeles Metro Bus: Express 487, Express 489*
- Foothill Transit: Silver Streak, 493*, 495*, 497*, 498*, 499*, 699*

* Indicates commuter service that operates only during weekday rush hours in peak-hour direction.

The station is also used by Los Angeles Metro Bus Express 487 and Express 489 along with Foothill Transit 493, 495, 497, 498, 499 and 699. Metro route 487 operates all-day, seven days a week; the rest only run during weekday peak periods.

=== Connections ===
There are also several bus routes that stop near the station using bus stops on surface streets:

- Los Angeles Metro Bus: 106, 251, 605
- LADOT DASH: Boyle Heights/East LA, Lincoln Heights/Chinatown
