= El Monte Busway =

Los Angeles Metro Busway

- I-10 ExpressLanes
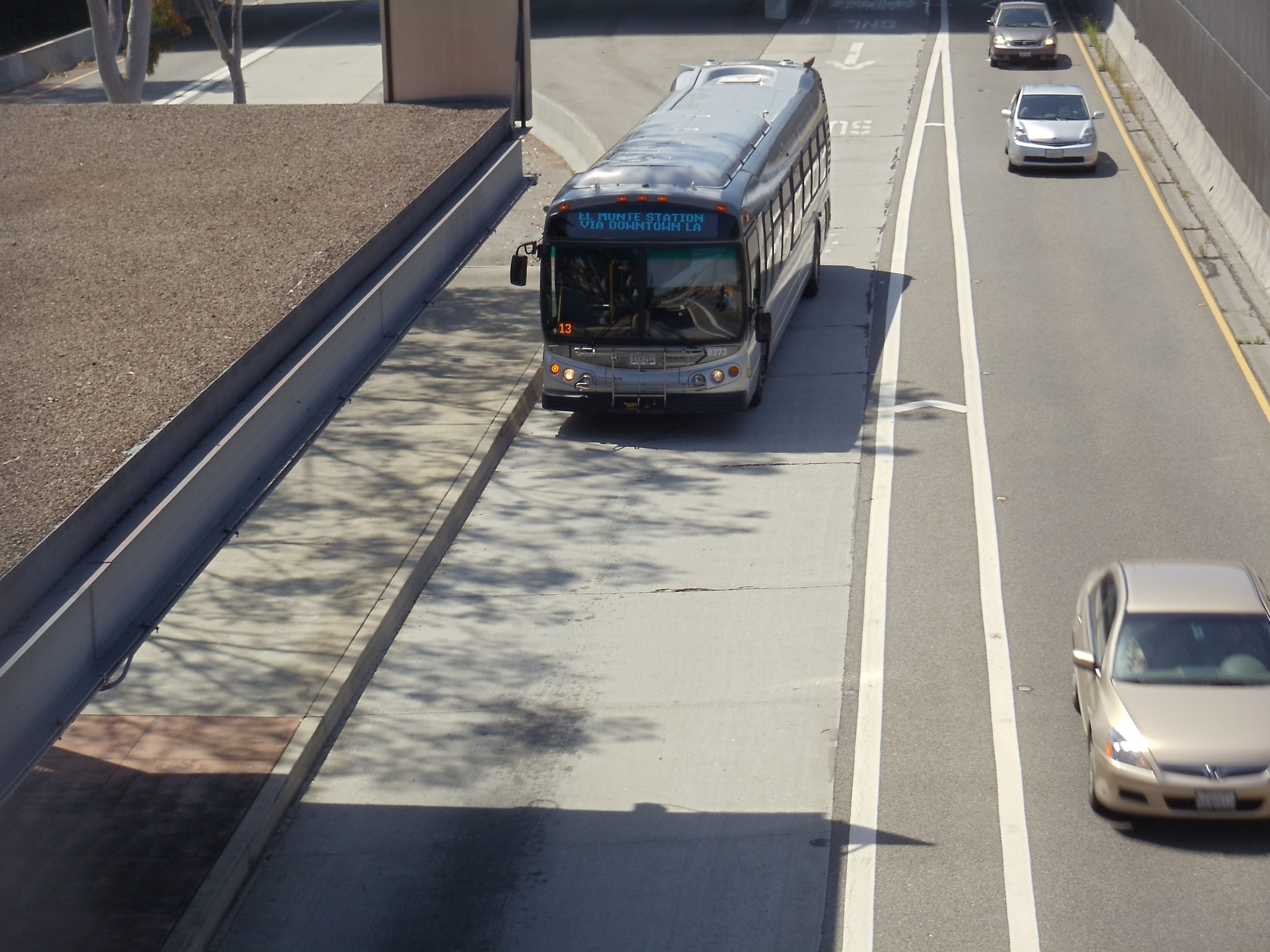
- Metro J Line bus running east on the El Monte Busway stops at Los Angeles General Medical Center

Overview
- System: Busway & High-occupancy toll lanes
- Operator: Los Angeles Metro
- Began service: January 1973; 53 years ago

Routes
- Routes: J Line; Metro Bus: Express 487, Express 489; Foothill Transit: Silver Streak, 490, 493, 495, 498, 499, 699
- Locale: Los Angeles County, California
- Start: El Monte station
- End: Union Station
- Length: 12 miles (19 km)
- Stations: 4

The El Monte Busway (also known as the I-10 ExpressLanes) is a 12-mile (19 km) shared-use express bus corridor (busway) and high occupancy toll (HOT) lanes running along Interstate 10 (San Bernardino Freeway) between Alameda Street near Los Angeles Union Station in Downtown Los Angeles and a point west of Interstate 605 (I-605) in El Monte, California. From Alameda Street to Interstate 710 (I-710) in Monterey Park, the El Monte Busway runs parallel to the north side of the freeway. After the I-710 interchange, these lanes merge back to the median of I-10. Eastbound buses exit the El Monte Busway at El Monte station before the HOT lanes for other vehicles end west of I-605. Buses also make intermediate stops at Cal State LA station and LA General Medical Center station. The busway opened in January 1973 to buses only, three-person carpools were allowed to enter in 1976, and the facility was converted to HOT lanes as part of the Metro ExpressLanes project on February 22, 2013. The entire bus route along the El Monte Busway between Alameda Street and El Monte station's bus entrance at Santa Anita Avenue carries the hidden state highway designation of Route 10S.

The El Monte Busway is used by two bus rapid transit routes: the J Line, operated by Los Angeles Metro and the Silver Streak, operated by Foothill Transit. It is also used by several Metro Express and Foothill Transit bus services, most of which only run during weekday peak periods.

The busway now carries 16,000 bus passengers per day with 49 buses using the system each hour at peak times and was described by the United States Department of Transportation as one of the most successful HOV facilities in the country in 2002.

== History ==
=== Construction ===
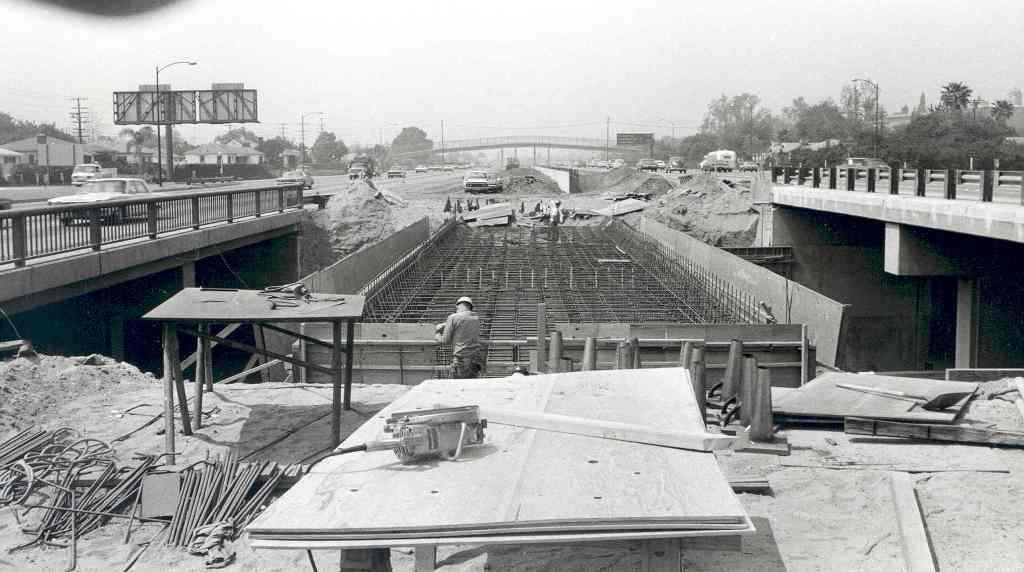
El Monte Busway under construction in 1972

The El Monte Busway was conceived in 1969 as a way to allow travelers to avoid traffic on Interstate 10 (San Bernardino Freeway), promising an 18-minute trip between El Monte and Downtown Los Angeles, compared to 35–45 minutes in the general-purpose lanes. The project was developed jointly by the California Department of Public Works, Division of Highways (a predecessor of today's Caltrans) and the Southern California Rapid Transit District (SCRTD) (a predecessor of today's Los Angeles Metropolitan Transit Authority). The 53 million dollar project was paid with federal, state and SCRTD funding and was also intended to be an experiment testing the feasibility of joint highway-bus operations and to increase the overall people-carrying capacity of freeway corridors.

The project was built in a right of way located north of and in the median of the freeway that was owned by Southern Pacific Railroad who purchased it from the bankrupt Pacific Electric streetcar system. In exchange for giving up part of their property, Southern Pacific would get new tracks capable of handling heavier freight loads compared to the old streetcar tracks. The project would also include a viaduct in El Monte to elevate Southern Pacific trains as they moved between the area near the east end of the busway to the mainline tracks near the present-day El Monte Metrolink station.

The formal groundbreaking for the El Monte Busway took place on January 21, 1972.

The El Monte Busway opened in stages, with the seven-mile eastern segment between Interstate 710 (then-signed as SR 7) and Santa Anita Avenue opening in January 1973. The El Monte station near the Santa Anita Avenue terminus would open later on July 14, 1973. The eastern section is located in the median of Interstate 10, with only paint lines separating traffic on the busway from the general-purpose lanes. Railroad tracks are also located in the median, separated from vehicle traffic with concrete barriers.

The western segment has a unique design that took longer to build. Traveling from east to west, a flyover ramp near Interstate 710 moves the lanes north of Interstate 10 to a station near California State University, Los Angeles. Just west of the Cal State LA station, the westbound busway lanes crossover the eastbound lanes, reversing the normal placement of the lanes. The reversed lanes allow buses to serve a single island platform station at the Los Angeles General Medical Center but prevent vehicles from entering the busway from the general-purpose lanes of Interstate 10 in the eastbound direction.

The LA General Medical Center station was completed in November 1974, the four-mile western segment between Mission Avenue in Los Angeles and Interstate 710 was completed in January 1975, and the Cal State LA station was finished in February 1975. The entire 11-mile busway was dedicated on February 18, 1975.

The El Monte was extended to its present length of 12 miles in 1989 with the opening of a one-mile extension from Mission Road to Alameda Street adjacent to Los Angeles Union Station.

=== Opening to carpools ===
The busway was opened to vehicles with three or more occupants during the 1974 Southern California Rapid Transit District strike, which lasted 68 days between August and October. In 1976, the busway was converted into a shared-use express bus corridor and high occupancy vehicle (HOV) lane, with carpools and vanpools with three or more occupants permitted during peak hours only. HOV access was extended to weekends in 1977 and 24 hours a day in 1981. Opening the busway to HOVs had only minimal impact on bus running time and transit ridership remained stable.

The requirement that vehicles must have three or more occupants left the El Monte Busway out of alignment with California's other HOV lanes, which generally required only two or more occupants. State senator Hilda Solis (D-La Puente) authored State Bill 63, which would lower the occupancy requirement from three occupants to two for a 24-month experiment starting January 1, 2000, hoping it would increase carpool rates. Despite opposition from Caltrans, Foothill Transit and the Southern California Transit Advocates (a transit users' organization), the bill was passed the state legislature and signed into law by Governor Gray Davis in July 1999.

The experiment was a disaster, journey times increased by 20 to 30 minutes as speeds on the busway dropped from 65 mph (105 km/h) to 20 mph (32 km/h) which was slower than the general-purpose lanes of Interstate 10 where speeds also dropped from 25 mph (40 km/h) to 23 mph (37 km/h). The change generated over 1,000 complaints to government agencies from bus riders and prior carpoolers. Solis at first defended the change, but by May, she supported Assembly Bill 769, which would rescind the change and restore the higher occupancy requirement during peak hours, which passed and took effect in July 2000. However, the lower two occupant requirement remained during off-peak hours and weekends.

=== Conversion to bus rapid transit and high occupancy toll ===
In the early 1990s, Caltrans built another busway in Los Angeles County, the Harbor Transitway from Los Angeles south to the new Harbor Gateway Transit Center. Los Angeles Metro staff recognized that there was an opportunity to link the operationally similar Harbor Transitway and El Monte Busway, even suggesting to Caltrans that a direct connection be built between the two busways. In 1998, Metro studied the extension but found it expensive and technically challenging, and to date, there have been no further efforts to connect the busways directly. Ahead of the 1996 opening of the Harbor Transitway, Metro staff studied how to operate its buses on the new facility. In 1993, they recommended the creation of a dual hub-and-spoke ("dual hub") system with a trunk route that served both the Harbor Transitway and the El Monte Busway and El Monte station and Harbor Gateway Transit Center serving as hubs. Ultimately, the Metro Board of Directors decided to continue running bus routes on both the El Monte Busway and Harbor Freeway as they had before.

After the very successful launch of the Orange Line (now G Line), a new busway in the San Fernando Valley, Metro decided to rebrand the county's other busways in an attempt to increase awareness. In March 2006, Metro decided that the Harbor Transitway would be colored bronze and the El Monte Busway would be colored silver on Metro's maps, and the two would be marketed as a "Combined Transitway Service." No changes were made in the operations of the bus routes operated on the lines. The changes were criticized as being difficult to understand for irregular and new riders.

The first bus rapid transit route came to the El Monte Busway in 2007 when Foothill Transit introduced the Silver Streak. The line replaced Foothill Transit route 480, the agency's busiest line. The Silver Streak used higher-capacity vehicles and eliminated many of the off-freeway deviations and minor stops on Line 480.

Metro returned to its plan for a dual-hub route in 2009, proposing a new bus rapid transit service called the Silver Line (now J Line) utilizing both the El Monte Busway and the Harbor Transitway. The new higher frequency service would be funded by converting both corridors into high occupancy toll (HOT) lanes, to be branded as the Metro ExpressLanes. The Silver Line began operations on December 13, 2009, with Metro planning to refurbish the aging stations along both corridors over the coming years. The eastern section of the El Monte Busway, between Interstate 710 and El Monte was restriped to create two HOT lanes in each direction. The electronic toll collection equipment for the HOT lanes on the Harbor Transitway went into service on November 10, 2012. The El Monte Busway's HOT lanes opened on February 22, 2013.

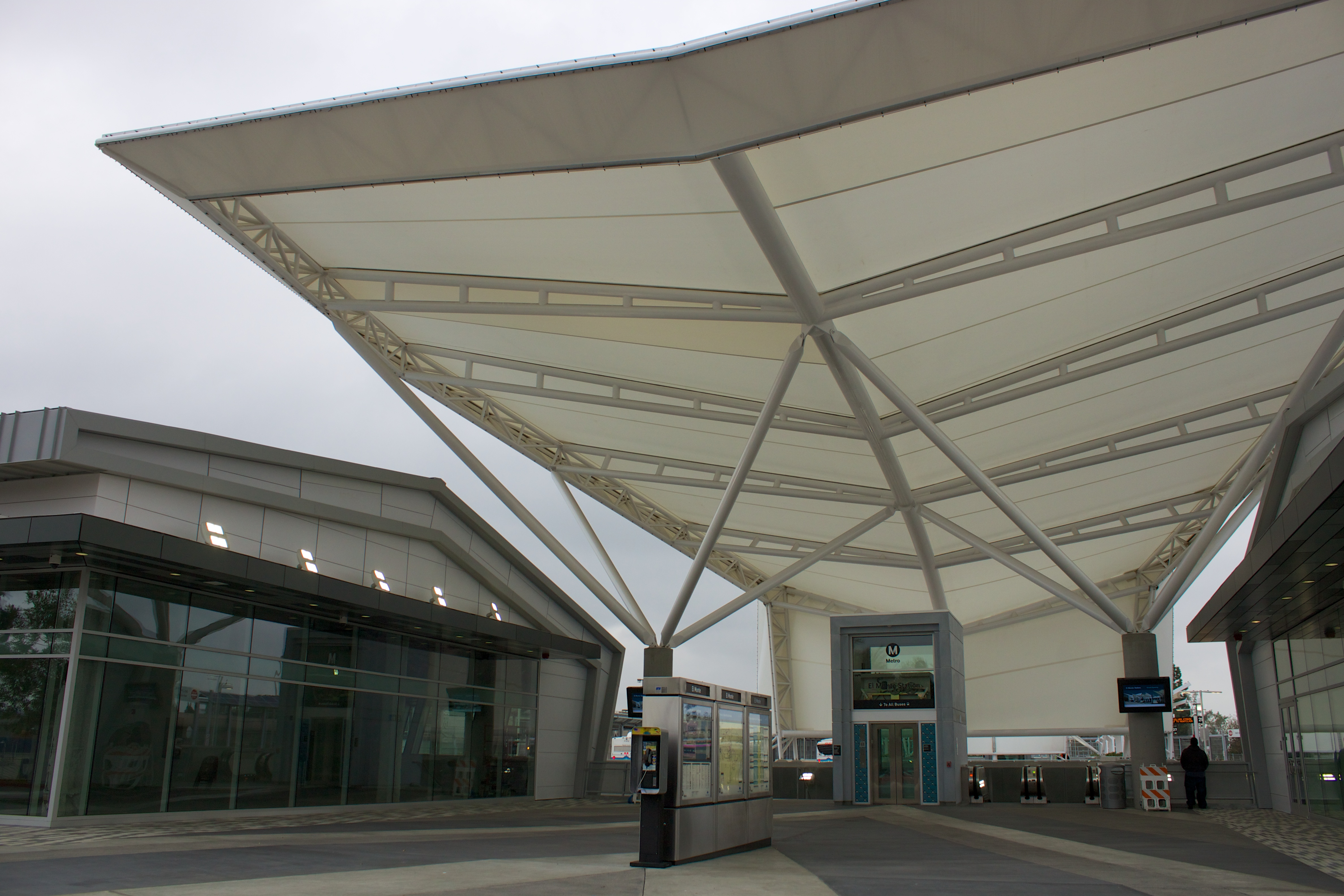
Entrance to rebuilt El Monte station

By 2010, El Monte station had become one of the busiest bus terminals west of Chicago, with 22,000 boardings daily as of 2010. Starting in 2010, the old station was demolished and replaced in October 2012 with a new station capable of handling up to 40,000 passengers per day.

In January 2015, the Cal State LA and LA General Medical Center stations were temporarily closed for one month for refurbishment and stairway and light replacement.

TAP card ticket vending machines were added to most stations in early 2017 to support all-door boarding on the Silver Line. Pre-payment of fares and all-door boarding reduces the time buses need to remain stopped at stations.

On November 1, 2020, a new transitway was opened on the south side of Patsaouras Transit Plaza to serve Union Station, funded in part by Metro ExpressLanes toll revenue. The station was originally scheduled to open in 2015, but project delays had pushed the opening back.

== Entrances and exits ==
El Monte Busway can only be entered and exited at a few points.

Westbound entrances are at I-605 (from Interstate 10), Santa Anita Avenue (from Interstate 10), El Monte station (buses only), Del Mar Avenue (ramp from street level), Fremont Avenue (from Interstate 10), and I-710 (buses from southbound I-710 only).

Westbound exits are at Santa Anita Avenue (to Interstate 10), Fremont Avenue (to Interstate 10), US 101, and Alameda Street

Eastbound entrances are at Alameda Street, Fremont Avenue (from Interstate 10), and Rosemead Boulevard/SR 19 (from Interstate 10)

Eastbound exits are at I-710 (buses to northbound I-710 only), Fremont Avenue (to Interstate 10), Del Mar Avenue (ramp to street level), Rosemead Boulevard/SR 19 (to Interstate 10), El Monte station (buses only), and I-605 (to Interstate 10).

== Tolls ==
As of January 2026, the high-occupancy toll lanes (HOT) are a 24/7 service. Solo drivers are tolled using a congestion pricing system based on the real-time levels of traffic. For two-person carpools, they are charged the posted toll during the peak hours between 5:00 am and 9:00 am, and between 4:00 pm and 7:00 pm; no toll is charged during off-peak hours. Carpools with two or more people and motorcycles are not charged at all hours. All tolls are collected using an open road tolling system, and therefore there are no toll booths to receive cash. Each vehicle using the HOT lanes is required to carry a FasTrak Flex transponder with its switch set to indicate the number of the vehicle's occupants (1, 2, or 3+). Solo drivers may also use the FasTrak standard tag without the switch. Drivers without any FasTrak tag will be assessed a toll violation regardless of whether they qualified for free.

== Bus services ==
A mix of Los Angeles Metro and Foothill Transit bus services utilize the El Monte Busway to operate between Downtown Los Angeles and various points in the San Gabriel Valley and Pomona Valley, as well as the San Bernardino County city of Montclair.

Two bus rapid transit routes utilize the El Monte Busway: the J Line, operated by Los Angeles Metro and the Silver Streak, operated by Foothill Transit. These routes offer frequent service, 24 hours a day, seven days a week. Metro and Foothill Transit offer a reciprocal fare program where pass holders may ride either J Line or Silver Streak buses between Downtown Los Angeles and El Monte station.

The El Monte Busway is also used by Metro Express 487 and 489 along with Foothill Transit 490, 493, 495, 498, 499, and 699. Metro Express 487 operates all-day, seven days a week; the rest only run during weekday peak periods.

=== List of stations ===
The El Monte Busway has four stations served by the Metro J Line, the Silver Streak and is also served by Metro Express and Foothill Transit buses. The stations from west to east are:

Station	Busway Services	Station Type	Date opened	City (Neighborhood)	Major connections and notes
Union Station	J Line: 910, 950; Metro Bus: Express 487, Express 489; Foothill Transit: Silver Streak, 490, 493, 495, 498, 499, 699	Transitway median	November 1, 2020	Los Angeles (Downtown)	Amtrak; LAX FlyAway; Metrolink; Paid parking: 2,189 spaces
LA General Medical Center	J Line: 910, 950; Metro Bus: Express 487, Express 489; Foothill Transit: Silver Streak, 490, 493, 495, 498, 499, 699	Transitway median	February 18, 1975	Los Angeles (Boyle Heights)	Metrolink does not stop here, but there are plans to add it as an infill station.
Cal State LA	J Line: 910, 950; Metro Bus: Express 487, Express 489; Foothill Transit: Silver Streak, 490, 493, 495, 498, 499, 699	Transitway median	February 18, 1975	East Los Angeles	San Bernardino
El Monte station	J Line: 910, 950; Foothill Transit: Silver Streak	Off-freeway transit center	July 14, 1973	El Monte	Park and ride: 1,287 spaces
