= Silver Streak (bus) =

Bus rapid transit service in Greater Los Angeles

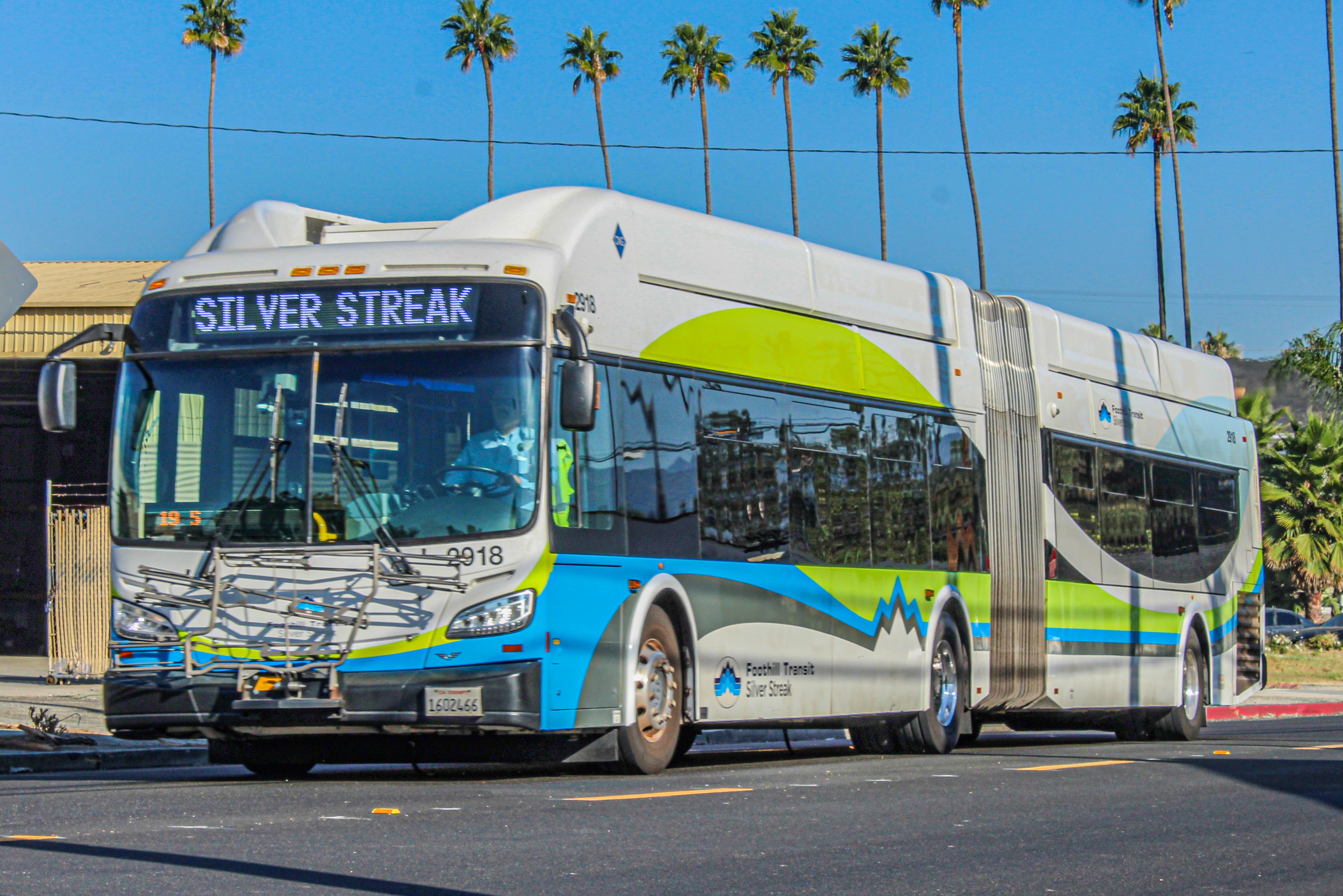
- Silver Streak bus in October 2023

Overview
- Operator: Foothill Transit
- Garage: Arcadia; Irwindale
- Vehicle: New Flyer Xcelsior XN60; Alexander Dennis Enviro500EV
- Began service: March 18, 2007; 18 years ago

Route
- Route type: Bus rapid transit
- Locale: Greater Los Angeles, California, U.S.
- Start: Downtown Los Angeles
- End: Montclair Transit Center
- Length: 38 mi (61 km)
- Stations: 6 (makes additional street stops)

The Silver Streak is a bus rapid transit service between Los Angeles and Montclair, operated by Foothill Transit. Between Downtown Los Angeles and El Monte, buses use the El Monte Busway. Between El Monte and the Montclair Transit Center, buses travel on the San Bernardino Freeway. The service was introduced in 2007 in response to overcrowding on Foothill Transit route 480. It runs 24 hours a day, with hourly service in the late evening.

LA Metro's J Line service, which also uses the El Monte Busway, was introduced in 2009, and since 2012, both agencies have offered a reciprocal fare program, allowing pass holders to ride either route between Downtown Los Angeles and El Monte.

== History ==
The express Silver Streak was introduced in 2007 in response to overcrowding on Line 480, Foothill's most popular line. The new service used higher-capacity vehicles and eliminated the many deviations and minor stops on Route 480. It was designed to appeal to discretionary riders. The route is also referred to as Line 707. Silver Streak was introduced with onboard Wi-Fi on the NABI articulated buses. It also had all-door boarding for pass holders, although it was subsequently discontinued due to the lack of rear TAP readers when that was introduced.

Ever since the introduction of the Silver Streak, the 'Local Plus Service' on routes 486, 488, 492, and 494 was converted to local service only and terminating at El Monte station; with routes 480 terminating at Westfield West Covina and 482 terminating at Puente Hills Mall (originally shortening to El Monte station until it was replaced by route 282). Passengers were then asked to transfer to either Silver Streak, 481 (later discontinued in Late 2017) or Metro service to Downtown Los Angeles.

On-board Wi-Fi was discontinued in 2009 due to low usage and to cut costs. Ridership of the Silver Streak fell since the introduction of the Metro J (Silver) Line in 2009.

In October 2012 the rebuilt and expanded El Monte station opened, and a joint fare program was introduced on the Silver Streak/Metro J Line. This allows the same ticket to be used on either service between the bus station and Downtown LA. In October 2013, a Silver Streak bus driver lost consciousness and crashed into the wall of the 10 Freeway, injuring seven passengers.

On January 23, 2023, a weekday-only stop at Cal Poly Pomona was added and hours were later extended to 9 p.m. in October 2023.

The Silver Streak uses a dedicated fleet of New Flyer Xcelsior XN60 buses, which are 60 feet (18 m) in length, articulated and fueled with compressed natural gas, which produces less emissions than diesel fueled engines. The Silver Streak was the first US route operated by the Alexander Dennis Enviro500EV, a double decker bus which was deployed in February 2021.

== Fares ==
Metro and Foothill Transit passengers can ride either the Metro J Line or Foothill's Silver Streak using each other's pass between Downtown Los Angeles and El Monte station. The program is not eligible outside this range. The joint agreement range of the Silver 2 Silver bus program is only between Downtown Los Angeles and El Monte station. Effective July 2022, one-way fare is $1.75 for trips of any length, including transfers to Foothill Transit local lines. A discounted fare of $0.75 for seniors, the disabled, and Medicare card holders applies.

== List of stops from west to east ==
Stop	Major Connections	Stop type
LA Convention Center (Pico Bl & Flower St)	LA Metro: (at Pico)	Street stop
↑ Flower St & 12th St	LA Metro: (at Pico)	Street stop
↓ Figueroa St & 11th St	LA Metro:	Street stop
↓ Olympic Bl & Flower St	LA Metro:	Street stop
Grand Av & 9th St / Olive St & Olympic Bl	LA Metro:	Street stop
Grand Av/Olive St & 7th St	LA Metro: (at 7th St/Metro Center)	Street stop
Grand Av/Olive St & 5th St	LA Metro: (at Pershing Square)	Street stop
↑ Grand Av & 2nd St	LA Metro: (at Grand Avenue Arts/Bunker Hill)	Street stop
1st St & Hill St	LA Metro: (at Civic Center/Grand Park)	Street stop
↑ 1st St & Broadway	LA Metro: (at Historic Broadway)	Street stop
LA City Hall (Spring St & 1st St)	LA Metro:	Street stop
Arcadia St/Aliso St & Los Angeles St	LA Metro:	Street stop
Union Station (Patsaouras Transit Plaza)	LA Metro: Amtrak, LAX FlyAway and Metrolink; Paid parking: 3,000 spaces	Busway station
LA General Medical Center	LA Metro:	Busway station
Cal State LA	LA Metro: Metrolink: San Bernardino	Busway station
El Monte	LA Metro: Park and ride: 1,287 spaces	Transit center
I-10 & Puente Av	Foothill Transit: 272, 274	Freeway ramp stop
West Covina Pky & Toluca Av	Foothill Transit: 178	Street stop
Plaza West Covina (West Covina Pky & California Av)	Foothill Transit: 178, 185, 272, 480, 488	Street stop
Vincent Av & Lakes Dr/Plaza Dr	Foothill Transit: 480, 488	Street stop
I-10 & Azusa Av	Foothill Transit: 280, 480	Freeway ramp stop
Cal Poly Pomona (weekdays only)		Street stop
Pomona Transit Center	Metrolink: Riverside; Amtrak: Sunset Limited, Texas Eagle; Foothill Transit: 195, 197, 286, 291, 292, 480, 482, 492; Omnitrans: 61 to Ontario International Airport; Park and ride: 907 spaces	Transit center
Monte Vista Av & Plaza Ln/San Jose St (Montclair Place)	Omnitrans: 85, 88	Street stop
Montclair Transit Center	Metrolink: San Bernardino; Foothill Transit: 188, 197, 480, 492, 699; Omnitrans: 66, 85, 88, 290; Riverside Transit Agency: CommuterLink 204; Park and ride: 1,600 spaces	Transit center
