= Cal State LA station =

Commuter rail and busway station in Los Angeles, California

Cal State L.A.
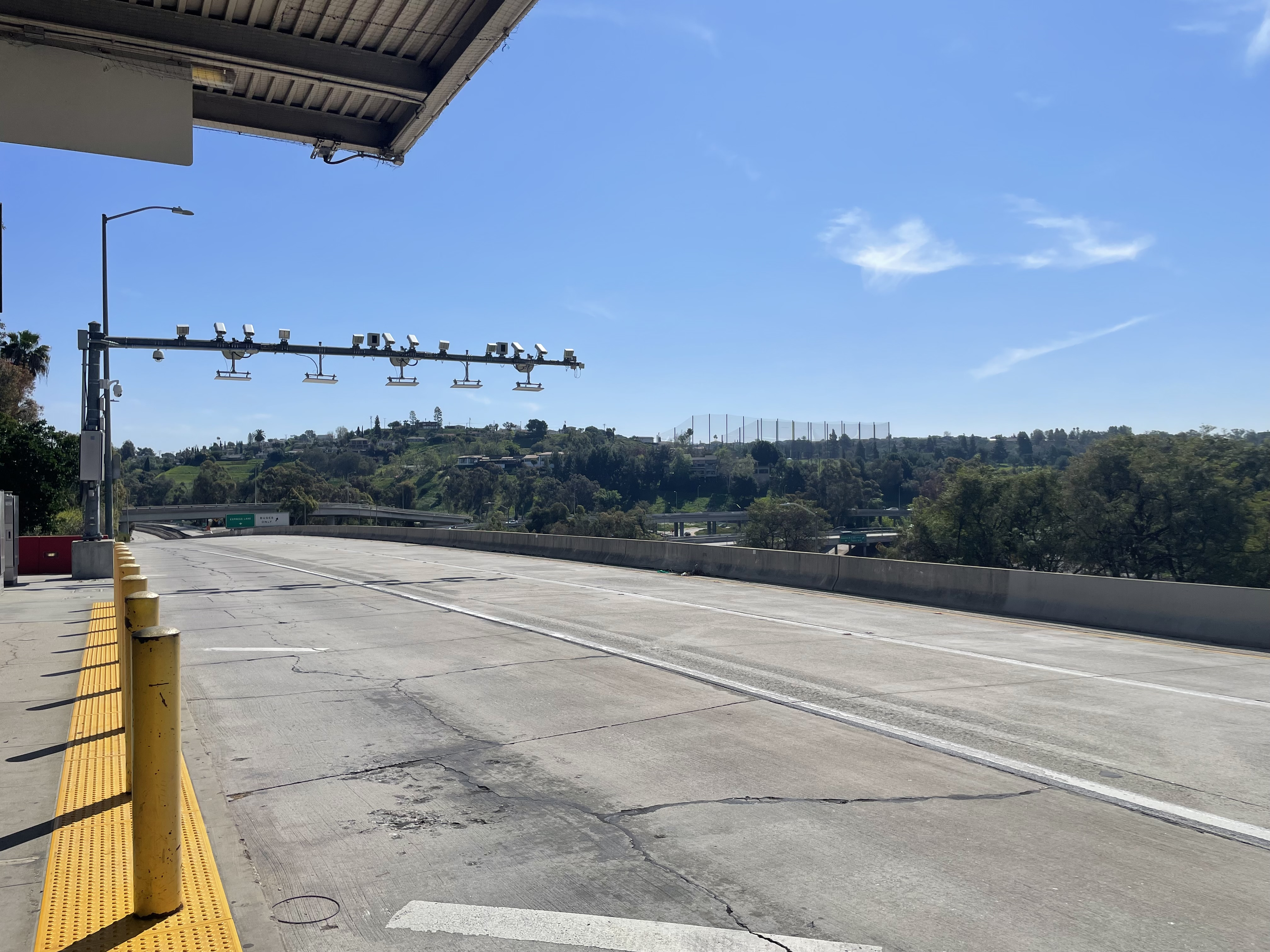
- Cal State LA westbound busway platform

General information
- Location: 5150 State University Drive; Los Angeles, California
- Coordinates: 34°03′45″N 118°10′13″W
- Owner: Caltrans and California State University, Los Angeles Consortium
- Operator: Los Angeles County Metropolitan Transportation Authority
- Line: SCRRA San Gabriel Subdivision
- Platforms: 2 side platforms (Busway); 1 side platform (Metrolink)
- Tracks: 1
- Connections: See connections section

Construction
- Cycle facilities: Racks
- Accessible: Yes

History
- Opened: February 18, 1975 (Busway); October 26, 1994 (Metrolink)

Passengers
- FY 2026: 380 weekday boardings (Metrolink)
- FY 2026: 914 weekday boardings (Metro)

Services
Preceding station	Metrolink	Following station
L.A. Union Station Terminus	San Bernardino Line	El Monte toward San Bernardino or Redlands
Preceding station	Metro Busway	Following station
LA General Medical Center toward Harbor Gateway or San Pedro	J Line	El Monte Terminus
Preceding station	Foothill Transit	Following station
LA General Medical Center toward Downtown Los Angeles	Silver Streak	El Monte toward Montclair
Location

Cal State LA station (officially Cal State Los Angeles station) is a commuter rail and busway station located on the El Monte Busway. The station is located between Interstate 10 and its namesake, the campus of California State University, Los Angeles. It is located in the El Sereno neighborhood of the City of Los Angeles and Eastside region, in southern California. The busway portion of the station opened on February 18, 1975, and the Metrolink platform was added on October 26, 1994.

Just west of this station, the westbound busway lanes cross over the eastbound lanes, reversing the normal placement of the lanes. They remain reversed until the western terminus of the El Monte Busway at Union Station. The reversed lanes allow buses to serve by a single island platform station at the Los Angeles County+USC Medical Center but prevent vehicles from entering the busway from the general-purpose lanes of Interstate 10 in the eastbound direction.

Just east of this station, the busway and train tracks move off the separate right of way and move into the median of Interstate 10.

== Service ==
The station is served by the Metrolink San Bernardino Line commuter rail line and two bus rapid transit routes: the J Line, operated by Metro and the Silver Streak, operated by Foothill Transit.

The Cal State L.A. station is served by 32 Metrolink - San Bernardino Line trains (16 in each direction) on weekdays, with trains arriving approximately every 30 minutes between 5:15 a.m. and 9:53 p.m. On weekends, the station is served by 16 Metrolink - San Bernardino Line trains (8 in each direction), with trains arriving every one to two hours between 8:08 a.m. and 9:48 p.m.

J Line buses run 24 hours a day between El Monte, Downtown Los Angeles, and the Harbor Gateway Transit Center, as route 910. Some trips continue to San Pedro between 6 a.m. and 8 p.m. and are signed as Route 950. On weekdays, buses operate every four to eight minutes during peak hours. They operate every 10 minutes in the midday, 20 minutes during evenings, 40 minutes during nights, and every hour overnight. On weekends, buses arrive every 15 minutes most of the day. They operate every 20 minutes during evenings, 40 minutes during nights, and every hour overnight.

Silver Streak buses run 24 hours a day between the Montclair Transit Center, El Monte Station, and Downtown Los Angeles. On weekdays, buses operate every 15 minutes most of the day, every 30 minutes during evenings and every hour overnight.

The busway station is also served by Los Angeles Metro Bus express routes 487 and 489 along with Foothill Transit routes 490, 493, 495, 498, 499 and 699. Metro's Express 487 route operates all-day, seven days a week; the rest only run during weekday peak periods.

== Local bus connections ==
Cal State LA station is served by several bus routes that use bus stops near the station on surface streets:

- Alhambra Community Transit: Blue
- City of Commerce Transit: 200
- Edmund D. Edelman Children's Court Shuttle
- El Sol: City Terrace/ELAC
- Los Angeles Metro Bus: 106, 258, 665
- Montebello Bus Lines: 10
- Monterey Park Spirit Bus: 5, Link Shuttle

== Station layout ==
Cal State LA station has a unique multi-level design. The street-level facilities are on the south end of the Cal State LA campus and include ticket vending machines and bus plaza. The westbound busway platform is one level below the street level. On the lowest level, the train platform is located directly under the westbound busway platform and the eastbound busway platform is reached from a bridge across both lanes of the busway.

The Metrolink platform at Cal State LA station is only 258 feet (79 m) long, about half the length of the typical Metrolink platform. Only the last three cars of trans traveling east towards Redlands and the first three cars of the trains heading west towards Los Angeles Union Station open their doors at this station.

== Gallery ==
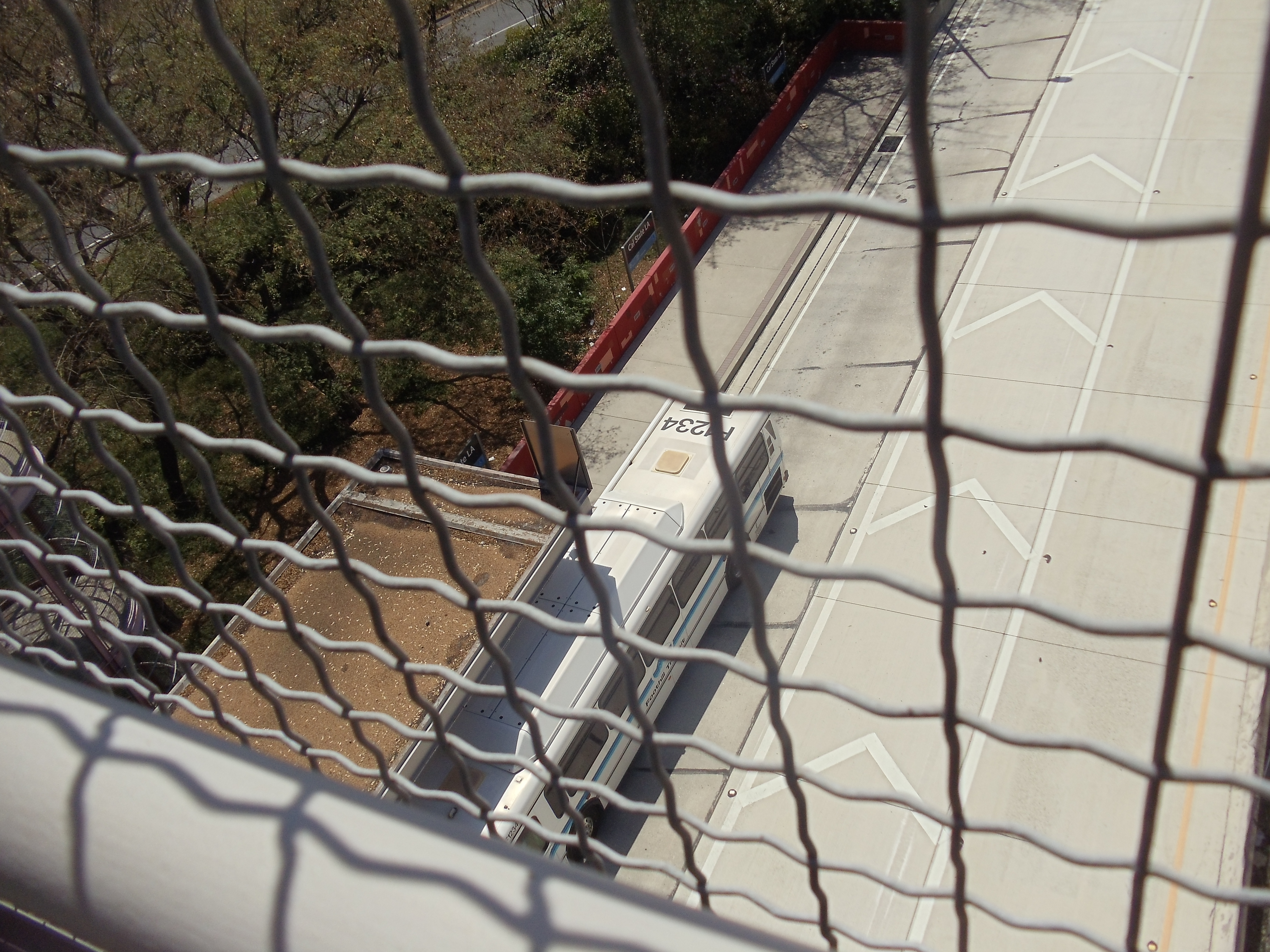
Eastbound platform.

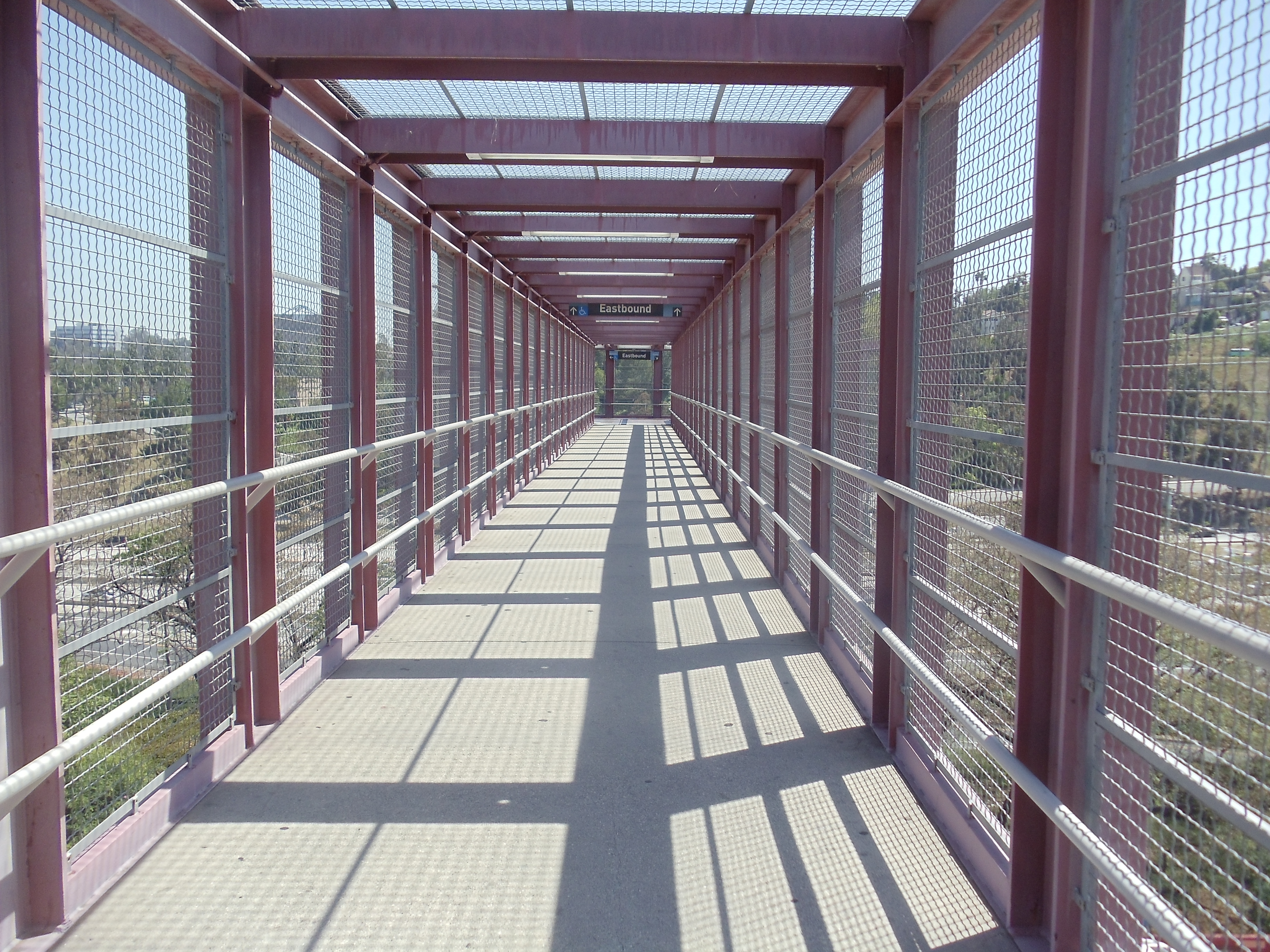
Bridge to the eastbound platform.
