= Alexander Dennis Enviro500EV =

Battery electric tri-axle double-decker bus

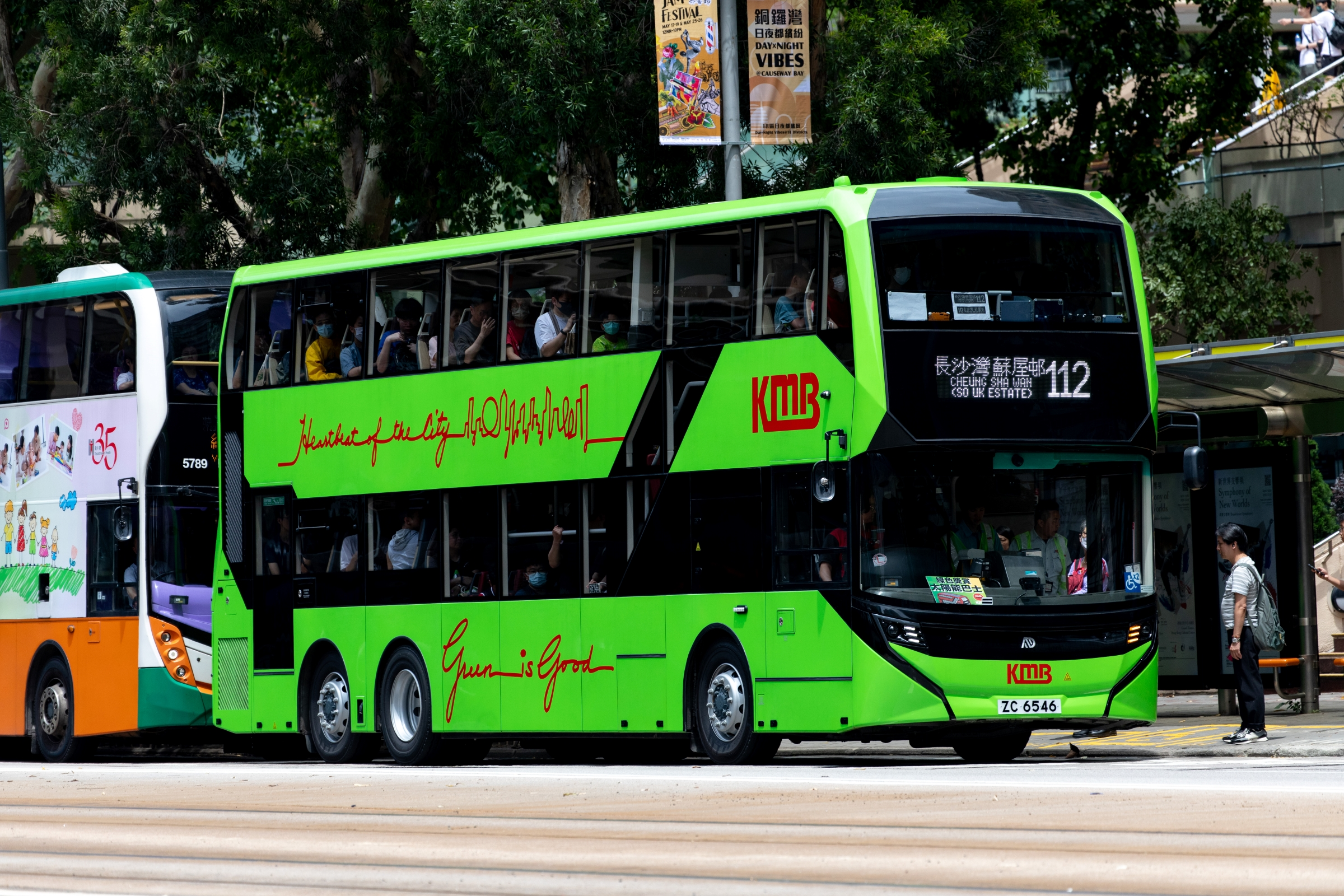
- Kowloon Motor Bus Alexander Dennis Enviro500EV in May 2024

Overview
- Manufacturer: Alexander Dennis
- Production: 2021–present
- Assembly: Zhuhai, Guangdong, China; Las Vegas, Nevada, U.S.

Body and chassis
- Doors: 2 doors
- Floor type: Low floor
- Chassis: Integral

Powertrain
- Electric motor: Voith Electrical Drive System HD
- Capacity: 100–117 (82–88 seated) (Asia and Oceania); 92 (80 seated) (North America)
- Battery: 472kWh NMC (Asia and Oceania); 709kWh or 827kWh NMC (North America)
- Electric range: 340 miles (550 km) (North America)

Dimensions
- Length: 12 m (39 ft 4 in) (Asia and Oceania); 13.5 m (44 ft 3 in) (North America)
- Width: 2.55 m (8 ft 4 in)
- Height: 4.3 m (14 ft 1 in) (Asia and Oceania); 4.1 m (13 ft 5 in) (North America)
- Curb weight: 27,500 kilograms (60,600 lb) (North America)

Chronology
- Predecessor: Alexander Dennis Enviro500 MMC

The Alexander Dennis Enviro500EV is a low-floor, three-axle battery electric double-decker bus produced by the British bus manufacturer Alexander Dennis for both the Asia and Oceania and North American bus operating markets.

== Design ==
Alexander Dennis announced the launch of a battery electric variant of its Enviro500 MMC tri-axle double decker in 2021 for the North American market, initially marketed as the Enviro500EV CHARGE. The North American Enviro500EV, seating 130 passengers and sharing components with the 2-axle Enviro400FCEV developed for the UK market, is equipped with a 648 kWh battery. A revised Enviro500EV for the North American market, featuring an integrally-constructed powertrain, battery capacities of 709kWh or 827kWh, a higher operating range of up to 340 miles (550 km) and a new exterior design in line with both the UK market's Enviro400EV and Enviro100EV buses, was launched in June 2025.

For the Asian and Oceanian markets, Alexander Dennis launched the Enviro500EV in August 2022 with an all-new body style and an integrally-constructed powertrain as part of a major redesign of its electric bus range, initially marketed towards bus operators in Hong Kong as the Enviro500EV NG. In either New Zealand or Hong Kong specification, the Asian and Ocenaian Enviro500EV is capable of seating between 100 and 117 passengers, with between 82 or 88 seated and the remainder standing or in dual wheelchair spaces. Both variants are powered by 472kWh NMC batteries, with the range of the bus subject to operating conditions, and feature dual doors and air conditioning as standard.

== Operators ==
=== Asia and Oceania ===
==== Hong Kong ====
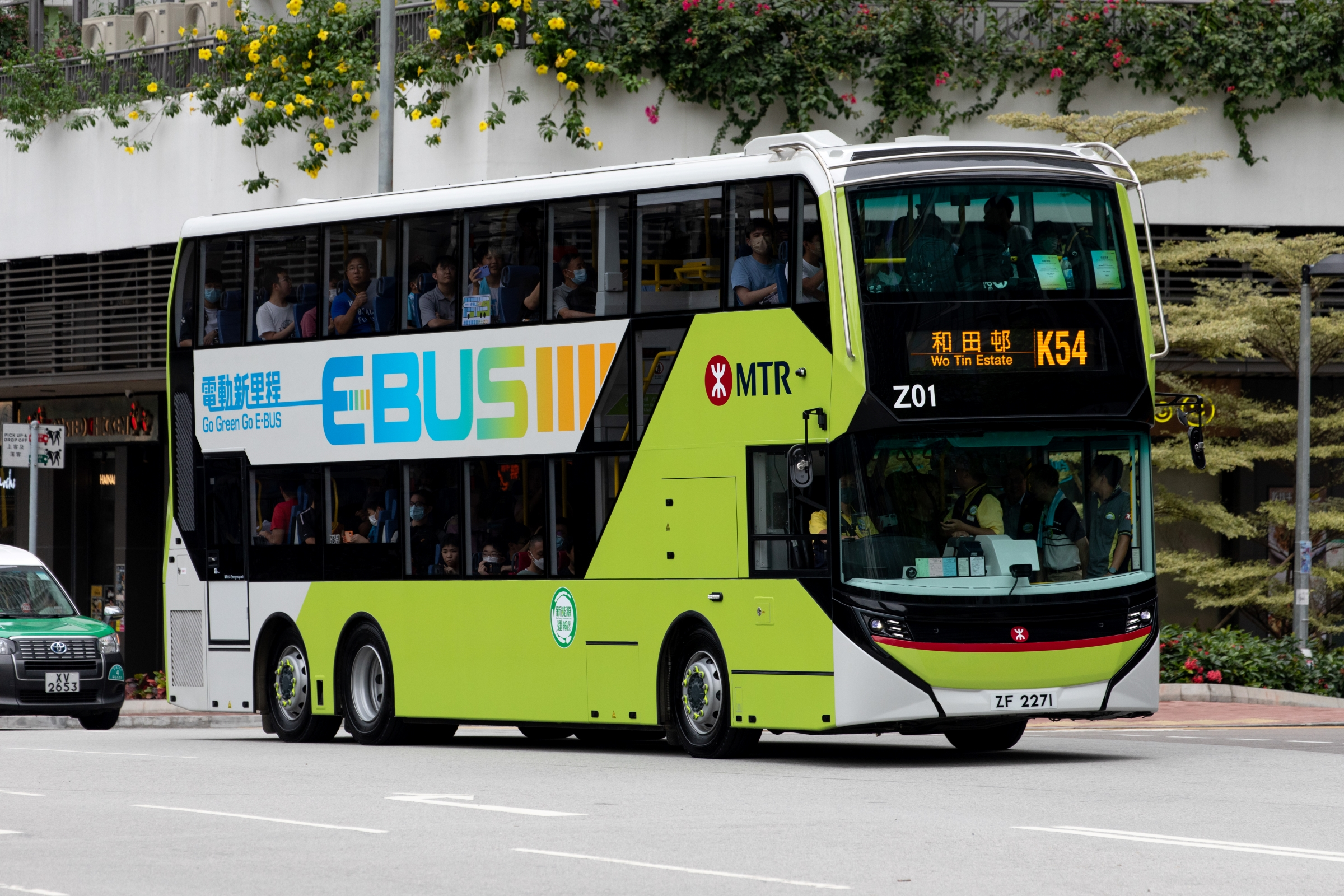
MTR Bus Enviro500EV in June 2024

The first production Enviro500EV was delivered to Kowloon Motor Bus of Hong Kong as part of an order for ten of the type in April 2023. MTR Bus followed by taking delivery of the first of 35 Enviro500EVs from late 2024 onwards for use on MTR station feeder services in the New Territories, with the CLP Group additionally taking delivery of four for employee shuttles between the group's power stations in July 2025.

=== North America ===
==== United States ====
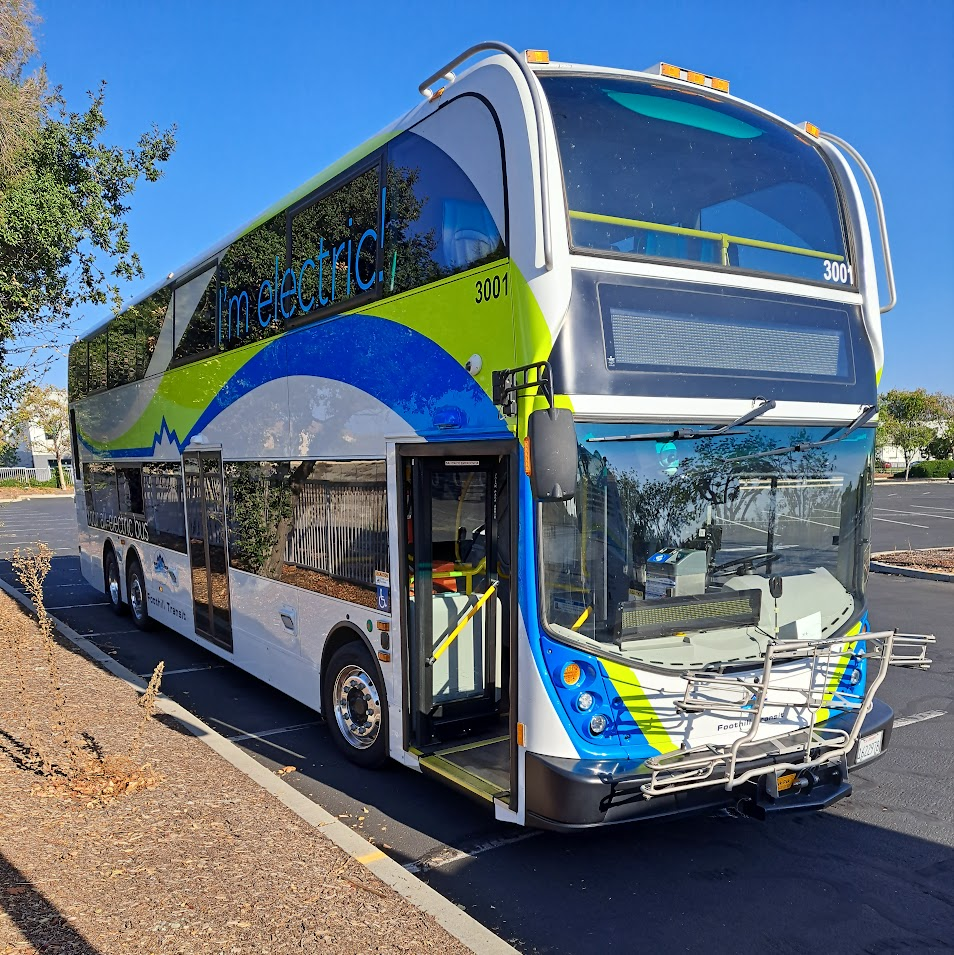
Foothill Transit Proterra-powered Enviro500EV in September 2022

California transit agency Foothill Transit ordered 2 Enviro500 MMCs with an all-electric drivetrain supplied by Proterra. These buses were delivered on 20 January 2021 before the formal launch of the Enviro500EV by Alexander Dennis. Foothill Transit later placed orders for twelve more in February 2024.

Seattle metropolitan transit operator Sound Transit was the first North American operator to order the integral Enviro500EV, placing orders for 33 Enviro500EVs for use on the Stride bus rapid transit scheme in February 2024.
