= Monterey Park Spirit Bus =

Bus operator in Monterey Park, California, USA

- Parent: City of Monterey Park
- Headquarters: 320 West Newmark Avenue
- Locale: Monterey Park, California, U.S.
- Service type: bus service, paratransit
- Routes: 6
- Lounge: the best transportation
- Operator: First Transit
- Website: Spirit Bus

The Monterey Park Spirit Bus is the transportation service of Monterey Park, California, United States, providing local routes that serve the need of those commuting within the city itself or who plan to connect with rail service to Los Angeles or surrounding suburbs. The bus lines complement the Los Angeles County Metropolitan Transportation Authority's crosstown routes through the city.

== Route overview ==
Spirit Bus operates 5 local routes and one shuttle. Route 1 to 4 operating in loops with terminal at Monterey Park City Hall. In addition, Spirit Bus operates Route 5 connect with Metrolink train service at CSULA on weekdays.

=== Fixed-Route ===
Route	Terminals		Service Area
1	Monterey Park Monterey Park City Hall		Atlantic Square
2	Monterey Park Monterey Park City Hall		Brightwood
3	Monterey Park Monterey Park City Hall		Emerson
4	Monterey Park Monterey Park City Hall		Pinetree Park
5	Los Angeles; Cal State LA transit Center	Monterey Park East LA College (Riggin St & Atlantic Bl)	Atlantic Square
5	Los Angeles; Cal State LA transit Center	Monterey Park; Atlas Av & Saturn St	Saturn

Spirit Bus does not operate on Saturday, Sundays, Thanksgiving Day, Christmas Day or New Year's Day. Service is provided on Memorial Day, Independence Day and Labor Day within limited hours.

=== Active fleet ===
Make/Model	Fleet numbers	Thumbnail	Year	Engine	Transmission	Notes
Ford F550	19		2011			
Glaval Bus Entourage	19		2011			
ENC E-Z Rider II BRT 32' CNG	85-87		2013	Cummins Westport ISL G	Allison B300R	
Ford F550	103		2011			
ENC Aero Elite	103		2011			
Chevrolet Express	106		2015			
Arboc Spirit of Freedom	106		2015			
Chevrolet Express	148-150		2018	Chevrolet 6.0L V8 CNG	6-Speed Automatic	
Arboc Spirit of Freedom	148-150		2018	Chevrolet 6.0L V8 CNG	6-Speed Automatic	
