= J Line (Los Angeles Metro) =

Bus rapid transit line in Los Angeles County, California

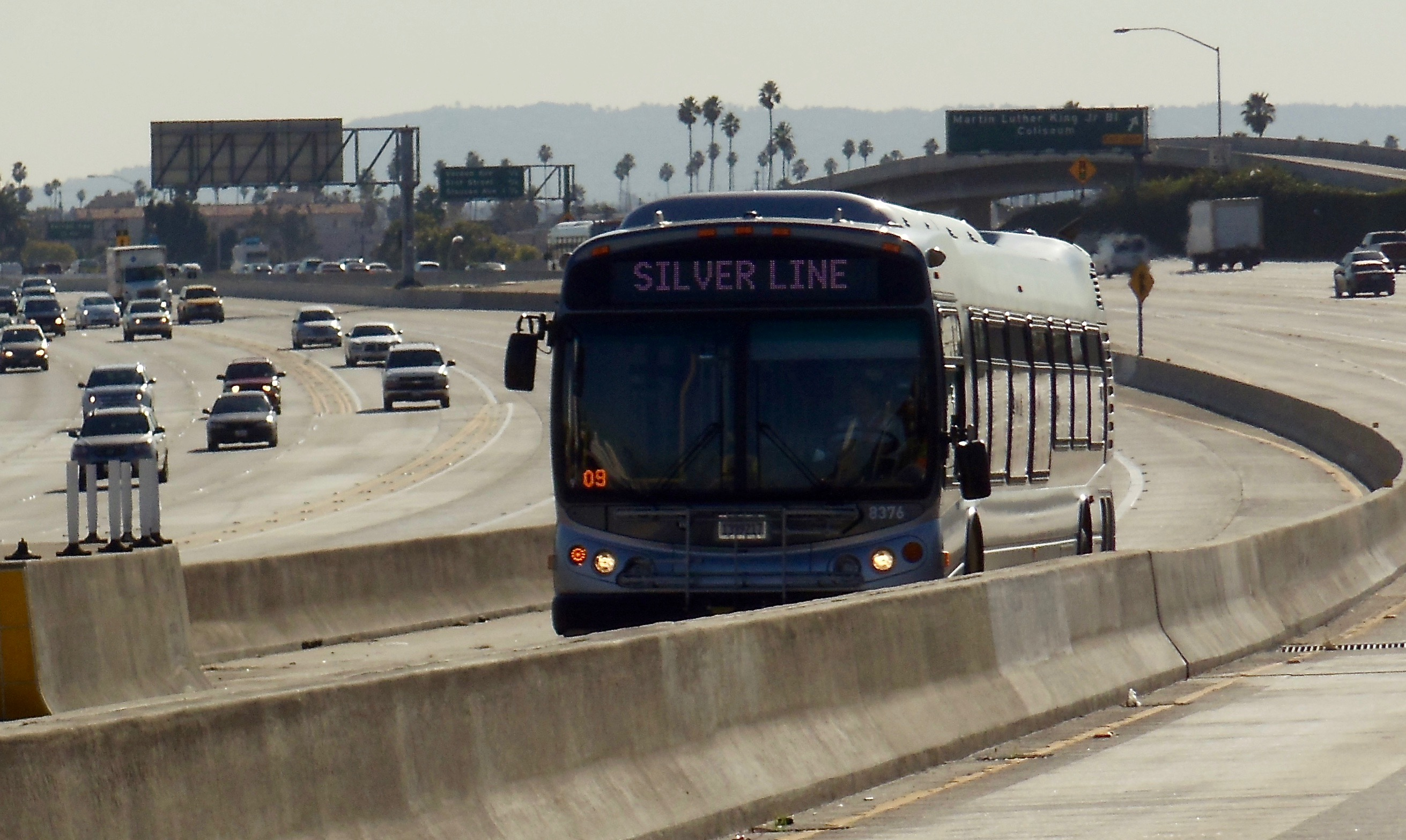
- J Line bus traveling on the busway near 37th Street/USC station

Overview
- Other name: Silver Line (2009–2020)
- Owner: Los Angeles Metro
- Line number: 910 & 950
- Termini: El Monte; Harbor Gateway Transit Center (910) San Pedro (950)
- Stations: 12 (makes additional street stops)
- Website: metro.net/riding/guide/j-line

Service
- Type: Bus rapid transit
- System: Los Angeles Metro Busway
- Depot(s): Division 9 (El Monte); Division 18 (Carson)
- Rolling stock: NABI 45C-LFW; BYD K9M
- Ridership: 4,949,143 (2024) ▲10.3%

History
- Opened: December 13, 2009; 16 years ago

Technical
- Line length: 38 miles (61 km)
- Character: Shared-use busways with some city streets
- Operating speed: 65 mph (105 km/h) (max.); 24.5 mph (39.4 km/h) (avg.)
Route map
J Line highlighted in silver

The J Line (formerly the Silver Line, also designated as lines 910 and 950) is a bus rapid transit (BRT) route in Los Angeles County, California, operated by Los Angeles Metro. The 38-mile (61.2 km) route runs between El Monte, Downtown Los Angeles, and the Harbor Gateway Transit Center, with select trips continuing to San Pedro. It is one of two lines that comprise the Metro Busway system.

The J Line primarily operates along two dedicated busways: the El Monte Busway and the Harbor Transitway, both of which are grade-separated corridors built into the Southern California freeway system. Service began on December 13, 2009, as part of the conversion of the corridors from high-occupancy vehicle (HOV) lanes to high-occupancy toll (HOT) lanes under the Metro ExpressLanes program. Revenue from tolls supports the operation of the line and the maintenance of its stations.

As J Line buses travel along the El Monte Busway and the Harbor Transitway, they serve stations built into the center or side of the roadway. There is a 3.6-mile (5.8 km) gap between the western end of El Monte Busway and the northern end of the Harbor Transitway in downtown Los Angeles, where J Line buses travel on surface streets, making a limited number of stops. Along the route, buses serve several of the region's major transportation hubs, including El Monte station, Union Station, 7th Street/Metro Center station, Harbor Freeway station, and the Harbor Gateway Transit Center.

In 2020, the line was renamed from the Silver Line to the J Line while retaining its route numbers and the color silver in its square icon as part of renaming all Metro lines.

== Service description ==
=== Services ===
Two services are operated under the J Line name:

- Line 910 operates with daily 24-hour service serving only the portion of the route between El Monte station, downtown Los Angeles, and the Harbor Gateway Transit Center.
- Line 950 operates daily service serving the entire route between El Monte station, downtown Los Angeles, and San Pedro.

=== Route description ===
The eastern section of the J Line route runs on the El Monte Busway between El Monte station in El Monte and Union Station in downtown Los Angeles. The southern section of the route runs on the Harbor Transitway between 37th Street/USC station in downtown Los Angeles and the Harbor Gateway Transit Center in the Harbor Gateway section of Los Angeles. Buses travel between the western end of the El Monte Busway and the northern end of the Harbor Transitway along 3.6 miles (5.8 km) of surface streets in downtown Los Angeles where J Line buses make a limited number of stops near major employment centers, tourist destinations and Metro Rail stations. Buses utilize about 2.5-mile (4.0 km) of bus-only lanes in each direction to speed trips across downtown Los Angeles.

Line 950 continues south of the Harbor Gateway Transit Center along the Harbor Freeway to San Pedro traveling in general-purpose freeway lanes and making two stops en route at stations located on the side of the freeway near off and on-ramps. In San Pedro, Line 950 buses once again travel along surface streets, serving the Harbor Beacon Park & Ride and making frequent stops along Pacific Avenue.

=== Hours and frequency ===
J Line buses run 24 hours a day between El Monte, Downtown Los Angeles, and the Harbor Gateway Transit Center, as route 910. Some trips continue to San Pedro between 6 a.m. and 8 p.m. and are signed as Route 950. On weekdays, buses operate every four to eight minutes during peak hours. They operate every 10 minutes in the midday, 20 minutes during evenings, 40 minutes during nights, and every hour overnight. On weekends, buses arrive every 15 minutes most of the day. They operate every 20 minutes during evenings, 40 minutes during nights, and every hour overnight.

Time	5–9a	10a–2p	3–5p	6–7p	8–11p	12–1a	2–4a	Ref.
Weekdays	4–10	10	4–10	10–20	20	40–60	60	
Weekends/holidays	15				20	40–60	60	

=== Rates ===
Like the other Metro Rail and Metro Busway lines, the J Line operates on a proof-of-payment system. Passengers may board at either the front or the rear door of J Line buses, and they validate their electronic fare TAP card at readers located on board the bus near the door. Metro's fare inspectors randomly inspect buses to ensure passengers have a valid fare product on their TAP card. Pre-payment of fares and all-door boarding reduces the time buses need to remain stopped at stations.

TAP vending machines are available at most stations (except Carson and Pacific Coast Highway) and near most street stops in downtown Los Angeles. However, because vending machines are unavailable at all stations and street stops, passengers who need to purchase a card or add funds can do so at the farebox on board the bus. None of the other Metro Rail or Metro Busway lines offer onboard sales.

Metro and Foothill Transit offer a reciprocal fare program in which pass holders may ride either J Line or Silver Streak buses between downtown Los Angeles and El Monte station.

=== Stations & stops ===
Services		Stations and stops		Type	Date opened	City (neighborhood)	Major connections and notes
910	950	Northbound	Southbound	Type	Date opened	City (neighborhood)	Major connections and notes
●	●	El Monte		Station	July 14, 1973	El Monte	Silver Streak; Park and ride: 1,287 spaces
●	●	Cal State LA		Station	February 18, 1975	Los Angeles (El Sereno)	Silver Streak; San Bernardino
●	●	LA General Medical Center		Station	February 18, 1975	Los Angeles (Boyle Heights)	Silver Streak
●	●	Union Station		Station	November 1, 2020	Los Angeles (downtown)	LA Metro: Amtrak, Silver Streak, LAX FlyAway, and Metrolink; Paid parking: 3,000 spaces
●	●	Aliso/Los Angeles	Arcadia/Los Angeles	Street stop	November 1, 2020	Los Angeles (downtown)	Silver Streak
●	●	Spring/1st		Street stop	December 13, 2009	Los Angeles (downtown)	Silver Streak
●	●	1st/Hill (Civic Center/Grand Park)		Street stop	December 13, 2009	Los Angeles (downtown)	LA Metro: Silver Streak
●	●	Olive/Kosciuszko (Grand Avenue Arts/Bunker Hill)	Grand/3rd (Grand Avenue Arts/Bunker Hill)	Street stop	December 13, 2009	Los Angeles (downtown)	LA Metro: Silver Streak
●	●	Olive/5th (Pershing Square)	Grand/5th (Pershing Square)	Street stop	December 13, 2009	Los Angeles (downtown)	LA Metro: Silver Streak
●	●	6th/Flower	—	Street stop	December 13, 2009	Los Angeles (downtown)	Silver Streak
●	●	Figueroa/7th (7th Street/Metro Center)	Flower/7th (7th Street/Metro Center)	Street stop	December 13, 2009	Los Angeles (downtown)	LA Metro: Silver Streak
●	●	Figueroa/Olympic	Flower/Olympic	Street stop	December 13, 2009	Los Angeles (downtown)	Silver Streak
●	●	Figueroa/Pico (Pico)	Flower/Pico (Pico)	Street stop	December 13, 2009	Los Angeles (downtown)	LA Metro: Silver Streak
●	●	Figueroa/Washington (Grand/LATTC)	Flower/Washington (Grand/LATTC)	Street stop	December 13, 2009	Los Angeles (downtown)	LA Metro:
●	●	Figueroa/23rd (LATTC/Ortho Institute)	Flower/23rd (LATTC/Ortho Institute)	Street stop	April 30, 2012 (southbound); June 23, 2013 (northbound)	Los Angeles (North University Park)	LA Metro:
●	●	Figueroa Way/Adams	Flower/Adams	Street stop	June 26, 2011	Los Angeles (North University Park)	
●	●	37th Street/USC		Station	August 1, 1996	Los Angeles (Exposition Park)	
●	●	Slauson		Station	August 1, 1996	Los Angeles (South Los Angeles)	Park and ride: 150 spaces
●	●	Manchester		Station	August 1, 1996	Los Angeles (South Los Angeles)	Park and ride: 253 spaces
●	●	Harbor Freeway		Station	August 1, 1996	Los Angeles (South Los Angeles)	LA Metro: Park and ride: 253 spaces
●	●	Rosecrans		Station	August 1, 1996	Los Angeles (Harbor Gateway)	Park and ride: 202 spaces
●	●	Harbor Gateway Transit Center		Station	August 1, 1996	Los Angeles (Harbor Gateway)	Park and ride: 980 spaces
	●	Figueroa/Victoria	Figueroa/190th	Street stop	December 13, 2015	Carson	
	●	Carson		Station	November 17, 2000	Carson	Park and ride: 143 spaces
	●	Pacific Coast Highway		Station	November 17, 2000	Carson	Park and ride: 240 spaces
	●	Harbor Beacon Park & Ride		Street stop	December 13, 2015	Los Angeles (San Pedro)	Park and ride: 180 spaces
	●	Beacon/1st		Street stop	December 13, 2015	Los Angeles (San Pedro)	
	●	Pacific/1st		Street stop	December 13, 2015	Los Angeles (San Pedro)	
	●	Pacific/3rd		Street stop	December 13, 2015	Los Angeles (San Pedro)	
	●	Pacific/7th		Street stop	December 13, 2015	Los Angeles (San Pedro)	
	●	Pacific/11th		Street stop	December 13, 2015	Los Angeles (San Pedro)	
	●	Pacific/15th		Street stop	December 13, 2015	Los Angeles (San Pedro)	
	●	Pacific/17th		Street stop	December 13, 2015	Los Angeles (San Pedro)	
	●	—	Pacific/19th	Street stop	December 13, 2015	Los Angeles (San Pedro)	
	●	Pacific/21st		Street stop	December 13, 2015	Los Angeles (San Pedro)	

== History ==
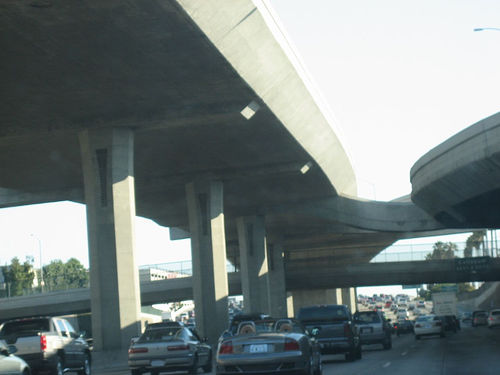
This elevated section of the Harbor Transitway carries the Metro J Line and the Metro ExpressLanes over the frequently congested Harbor Freeway.

The idea for the route now known as the J Line came in 1993, as Los Angeles Metro staff studied how to operate buses on the Harbor Transitway, which was under construction and would open three years later in the summer of 1996. Metro staff recommended the creation of a dual hub-and-spoke ("dual hub") system with a trunk route that served both the Harbor Transitway and the operationally similar El Monte Busway, which had opened two decades earlier in January 1973. Staff said the dual hub proposal, would be the most efficient and cost less to run, but the Metro Board of Directors decided to continue running bus routes on both the El Monte Busway and Harbor Freeway as they had before.

After the Harbor Transitway opened, ridership was radically lower than expected: Caltrans had projected that 65,200 passengers would travel along the Harbor Transitway each day, but after 10 years, the facility had only attracted 3,000 passengers per weekday. That amount is low compared to the El Monte Busway, which had 32,000 boardings a day in November 2000.

After the very successful launch of the Orange Line busway (now the G Line) in the San Fernando Valley, Metro decided to rebrand the county's other busways in an attempt to increase awareness. In March 2006, Metro decided that the Harbor Transitway would be colored bronze and the El Monte Busway would be colored silver on Metro's maps, and the two would be marketed as a "Combined Transitway Service." No changes were made in the bus routes operated on either facility. The changes were criticized as too complex for irregular and new riders to understand.

Metro returned to its plan for a dual-hub route in 2009, proposing a new bus rapid transit service called the Silver Line (now J Line) utilizing both the Harbor Transitway and the El Monte Busway. The new higher frequency service would be funded by converting both corridors into high-occupancy toll (HOT) lanes, to be branded as the Metro ExpressLanes. The bus route began operations on December 13, 2009, and the HOT lanes on the Harbor Transitway went into service on November 10, 2012 and the El Monte Busway's HOT lanes opened on February 22, 2013.

Since the start of the J Line, Metro has been working on refurbishing the aging stations along both the Harbor Transitway and the El Monte Busway. The 1970s-era El Monte station was demolished and replaced by a new station in October 2012. All the Harbor Transitway stations were refurbished with real-time arrival signs, new wayfinding signage, improved lighting, and soundproofing by late 2012. The El Monte Busway stations received a similar refurbishment in January 2015. TAP card ticket machines were added to stations in early 2017 to support all-door boarding on J Line buses. Metro has also added a new station on the El Monte Busway at Union Station that opened on November 1, 2020.

Efforts have also been made to speed up J Line buses as they cross downtown Los Angeles on surface streets. LADOT added bus priority to traffic lights in 2012, and over several years about 2.5 mi (4.0 km) of bus-only lanes have been added in each direction, allowing buses to bypass traffic on nearly 70% of the 3.6 mi (5.8 km) surface street portion of the route.

In 2015, Metro integrated the last remaining Metro Express route on the Harbor Transitway, the 450X to San Pedro, into the Silver Line. Initially, a new express Silver Line service was added that served San Pedro and skipped many Harbor Transitway stations, but by June 2017, San Pedro-bound buses were serving all stations, and the increase in speed was deemed not enough to justify increased crowding on other buses.

In 2023, as part of fare restructuring, the J Line fares were lowered to match those of all other Metro lines. Previously, an express fare of $2.50 had been charged.

== Future developments ==
As part of Metro's NextGen Bus Plan, the agency had proposed discontinuing the J Line's route 950, which offers service to San Pedro. Metro said the change would allow the J Line to transition to battery-electric buses and would improve the reliability of buses that operate between El Monte station and Harbor Gateway Transit Center. Service to San Pedro would have been shifted to a new line between San Pedro and the Harbor Freeway station via I-110, with a peak-hour extension to downtown Los Angeles. The San Pedro neighborhood opposed the change, with citizens requesting that they also receive electrified bus service and maintain a one-seat ride to downtown LA and El Monte. As a result, plans to end the J Line's service to San Pedro were put on hold indefinitely. Metro has abandoned any public timeline regarding electrification of the J line, however the BYD vehicles that would be used were scheduled for delivery by 2024 and subsequently began service since.

== Ridership and reliability ==
Ridership has steadily grown on the J Line each year.

An estimated 6,612 passengers rode the line each weekday in January 2010 (the first whole month of operation), and ridership has grown steadily each year since. Ridership set a new all-time high in February 2016, with an estimated 16,884 passengers riding the line each weekday.

Annual ridership
Year	Ridership	%±
2010	2,108,032	—
2011	2,699,993	+28.1%
2012	3,374,257	+25.0%
2013	3,771,474	+11.8%
2014	4,178,964	+10.8%
2015	4,334,742	+3.7%
2016	4,509,983	+4.0%
2017	4,363,651	−3.2%
2018	4,467,409	+2.4%
2019	5,209,169	+16.6%
2020	2,598,392	−50.1%
2021	2,861,680	+10.1%
2022	3,739,247	+30.7%
2023	4,486,462	+20.0%
2024	4,949,143	+10.3%
Source: Metro

The on-time performance of the Metro J Line is currently around 82.4%, defined as being less than 5 minutes behind schedule. That places it far behind the Metro Rail lines (99% on time) and G Line (94% on time), but better than an average Metro bus route (80.6% on time). On-time performance benefits from the active traffic management system installed as part of the Metro ExpressLanes project.

== Incidents ==
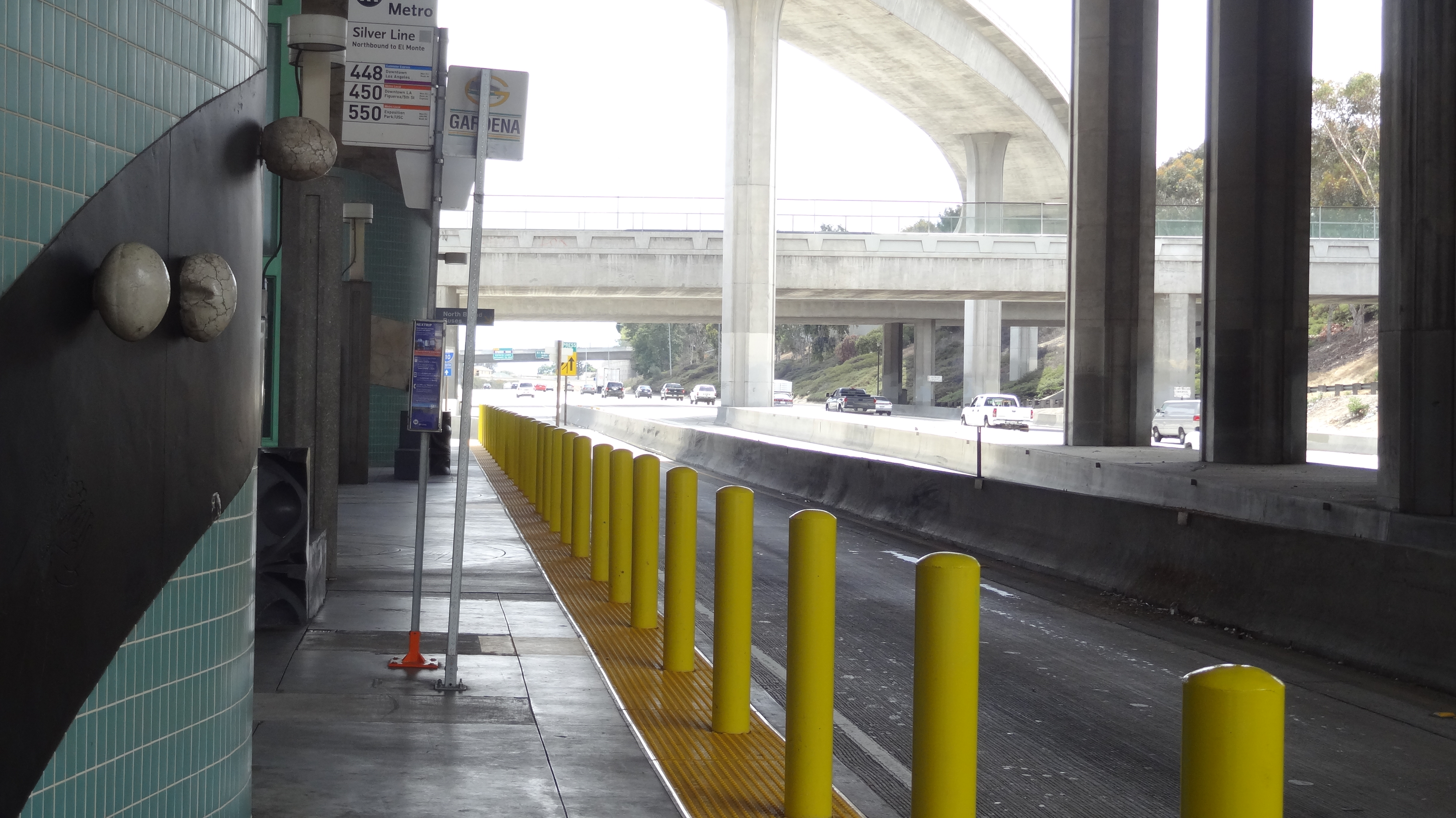
Bollards were installed at Harbor Freeway station and all similar stations after the crash.

On February 22, 2012, a drunk driver on the Harbor Freeway mistakenly entered the bus-only station area of the Harbor Freeway station. The driver, 51-year-old Stephen L. Lubin of Sun Valley, was traveling at 80 mph (130 km/h) in his 2009 Honda Fit (15 mph (24 km/h) over the freeway's posted speed limit) as he entered the station and encountered a bus stopped at the platform. Lubin swerved to avoid hitting the bus and drove onto the station platform where he hit seven people, critically injuring six, before slamming into a pole on the platform.

After the crash, Metro's CEO Art Leahy asked Metro's safety committee staff to review the layout of busway stations and safety signage on the roadways leading into the station areas. As a result of that investigation, Metro added concrete-filled metal bollards to all stations on the Harbor Transitway and the El Monte Busway to prevent vehicles from entering the platform. Additional markings were added on roadways leading into stations.

== Fleet ==
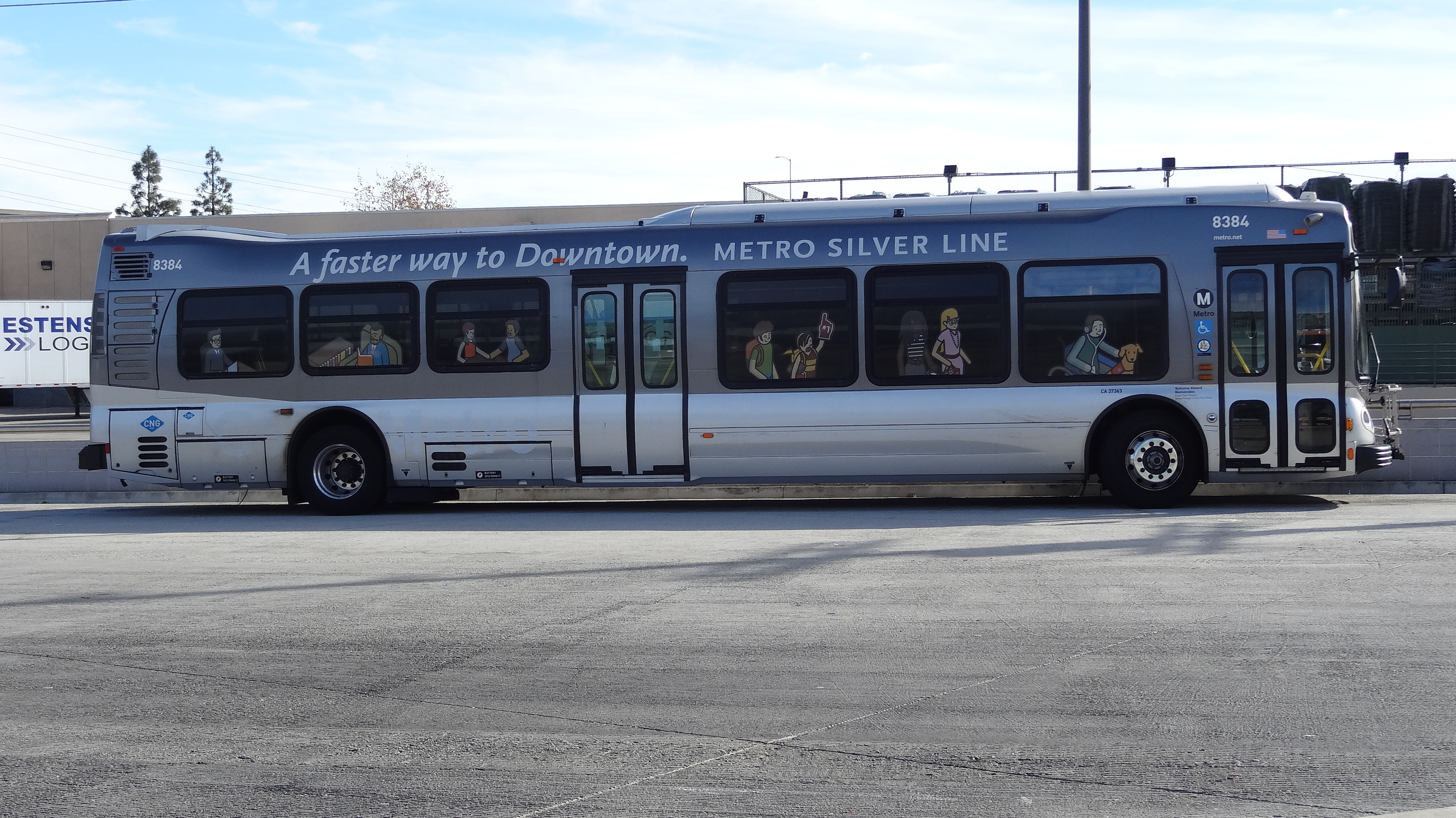
Metro J Line 45-foot NABI CompoBus

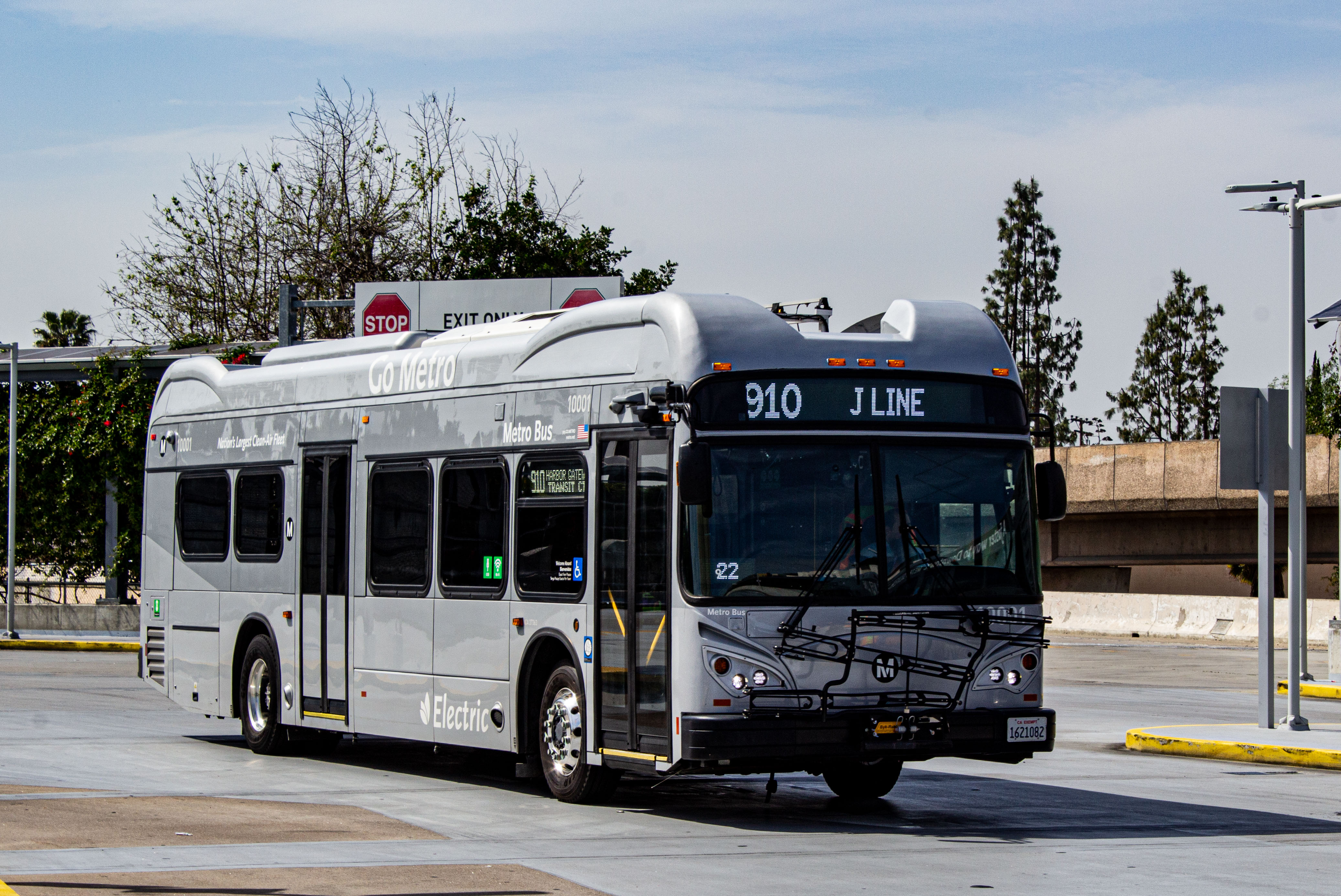
Metro BYD K9MD bus serving the J line

Buses used on the J Line are operated out of two divisions (Metro's term for storage and maintenance facilities). Division 9 is in El Monte on the grounds of El Monte station and Division 18 at South Figueroa Street and West Griffith Street in Carson, about a mile south of the Harbor Gateway Transit Center.

The Metro J Line primarily operates with a fleet of dedicated BYD K9-MD coaches. Each 40-foot-long (12 m) bus is battery electric, supported by charging infrastructure at the line's termini at El Monte and Harbor Gateway transit centers and at its operating divisions at D9 and D18. At times, the BYD vehicles are pulled from revenue service for long periods of time due to the common nature of recalls and maintenance issues associated with these buses, and then eventually return. Older NABI 45C vehicles replace those buses in the event of a longer removal of the BYDs from service. Coaches are painted with a special grey livery that matches the design of newer Metro Rail vehicles and the coaches used on G Line. During peak hours, NABI Metro 45C CompoBus supplement the K9M fleet when service levels demand a greater quantity of buses than working K9Ms Metro has on hand. Historically, these buses served the line since its inception and are now in the process of being replaced.

In January 2022, BYD K9M battery-electric buses began their phased introduction to the J Line fleet, with plans to have these coaches replace the NABI fleet sometime in the near future.

The full replacement of the NABI vehicles with BYD K9M-ER models is pending delivery of additional K9M coaches and repair of defective K9Ms that have been sent back to BYD.

== See also ==
- List of Los Angeles Metro Busway stations
