= Plaza West Covina =

- Location: West Covina, California, U.S.
- Coordinates: 34.0709°N 117.9325°W
- Address: 112 Plaza Drive
- Opened: 1962; 64 years ago (as West Covina Plaza); 1975; 51 years ago (as West Covina Fashion Plaza)
- Previous names: West Covina Plaza (1962–1974); West Covina Fashion Plaza (1975–1991); Plaza at West Covina (1991–1998); Westfield Shoppingtown West Covina (1998–2005); Westfield West Covina (2005–2013)
- Developer: Sylvan Shulman (1962); May Centers, Inc. (1975)
- Manager: Pacific Retail Capital Partners
- Owner: Starwood Retail Partners (90%) Westfield Group (10%) Golden East Investors Pacific Retail Capital Partners Phillips Edison & Company
- Architect: ELS
- Num. of stores: 185
- Num. of anchor tenants: 7 (5 open, 2 vacant)
- Floor area: 1,200,000 sq ft (110,000 m^{2})
- Floors: 2 (1 in Best Buy, EōS Fitness, and Nordstrom Rack, 3rd floor offices in JCPenney, 3 in Parking Garage and former Sears)
- Website: shoppingplazawestcovina.com

Plaza West Covina is a large regional shopping mall in West Covina, California, owned by the Starwood Capital Group. Its anchor stores are Macy's, JCPenney, Nordstrom Rack, Best Buy, and EōS Fitness with two vacant spaces last occupied by Sears and Forever 21. Westfield America, Inc., a precursor to Westfield Group, acquired the shopping center in 1998 and renamed it "Westfield Shoppingtown West Covina", dropping the "Shoppingtown" name in June 2005. In October 2013, the Westfield Group sold the mall to Starwood Capital Group and the mall is now managed by Pacific Retail Capital Partners. In the 2013 sale of the mall, Westfield kept a 10% equity stake in the property.

== History ==
=== Penney's and West Covina Center (1954) ===
The history of what is now Plaza West Covina dates back to two original shopping centers.

In 1954, plans were announced for the new 36-acre, 50-store West Covina Center at the eastern end of what is now the Plaza space anchored by a 50,000 square-foot J. C. Penney, with parking for over 2,000 cars. It was to cost about $5 million, financed and built by Los Angeles financier Sylvan S. Shulman and associates. It was stated at the time that the Penney's would be "West Covina's metropolitan-type store".

=== Broadway/Desmond's "Plaza" (1962) ===
The Broadway, opened August 6, 1962 and Desmond's, a specialty retailer, opened April 30, 1962, anchoring a new West Covina Plaza, at the northwest end of what is now the Plaza. The complex would be incorporated into the later Plaza, but was demolished in 1974 except for The Broadway and Desmond's.

=== Deterioration ===
By 1968, the city of West Covina's general plan identified deterioration in the shopping centers district, such as poor traffic circulation, noting that it was one of the first cities in the country to identify deterioration in a modern planned shopping center district. Traffic circulation was poor, the Penney's-anchored "Center" was "poorly built and planned" and the Broadway-anchored "Plaza" while "built to a high standard of architectural and landscaping design", "could use some color to add to its appeal", according to the study.

=== Fashion Plaza (1975) ===
In 1973, plans were announced to build a new, large, enclosed mall to replace the two existing malls, to be known as "West Covina Fashion Plaza", which would open in 1975. Sylvan S. Shulman was the developer and Burke Kober Nicolais was the architect.

The old centers would be demolished, except for The Broadway–Desmond's complex.

- JCPenney moved from its old building at the "Center" at 1120 West Garvey into its new building which opened together with 40 mall shops on October 22, 1975 and measured 216,777 square feet (20,139.2 m^{2}) including the freestanding auto center
- Bullock's (150,000 square feet (14,000 m^{2})) opened on September 25, 1975
- The 1962 Broadway building (151,000 square feet (14,000 m^{2})) remained as an anchor of the new mall
- Desmond's folded in the late 1970s and became a 2-story Tower Records location.

=== 1990s ===
In 1991, then-named Sylvan S. Shulman Co. changed the official name of the mall to "Plaza at West Covina". In 1992–1993, a new wing anchored by Robinsons-May was constructed east of the Bullock's store. The first major anchor changes didn't come until 1996, when Federated Department Stores sold The Broadway store to Bloomingdale's, but due to lease issues, it became a Sears instead, and converted the Bullock's location to Macy's. Sears opened their new location in 1996, moving from a nearby stand-alone location in Covina, which was located where the AMC Covina 17 now sits.

=== 2000s and Expansion ===
On September 9, 2006, Federated renamed the old Robinsons-May store as Macy's and temporarily operated two stores at the mall.

Tower Records closed in late 2006. The mall's parking lot was also home to the newest Bob's Big Boy restaurant, which was located in the old Chevy's space (since closing) and a new concert venue known as Crazy Horse Live.

In the late 2000s the mall was redeveloped:

- Phase I was the expansion of the former Robinsons-May space into an 180,000-square-foot (17,000 m^{2}) Macy's.
- Phase II consisted of:
  - Demolishing the vacant former 144,527-square-foot (13,427.0 m^{2}) Bullock's/Macy's building (closed since March 2008) into a mini-anchor space for Best Buy and the addition of approximately 130,000 square feet (12,000 m^{2}) of retail and 5 restaurants along the northern façade of the mall.
  - Phase II includes the addition of the Best Buy, which relocated from an older location across from the mall, and remodel and flagship introduction of Forever 21.
- Phase III extended the lifestyle development of Phase II into the remaining northern façade of the mall between Red Robin and Sears, which included the addition of approximately 32,000 square feet (3,000 m^{2}) and the reconfiguration of exiting mall space. This phase featured a second mini-anchor space of 45,000 square feet (4,200 m^{2}) for a Nordstrom Rack as well as a Gold's Gym.

=== 2010s ===
In 2015, Sears Holdings spun off 235 properties, including the Sears at Plaza West Covina, into Sertiage Growth Properties.

Crazy Horse, which closed in 2015, was demolished and replaced by a Porto's Bakery. Porto's opened on April 30, 2019.

On November 7, 2019, it was announced that Sears would be closing this location a part of a plan to close 96 stores nationwide. The store closed on February 16, 2020.

In October 2020, Spirit Halloween opened up a temporary location in the vacant Sears space for the Halloween Season. On November 2, 2020, Spirit Halloween moved out of the building. Today, the building that once occupied The Broadway and then Sears, is now vacant.

On October 30, 2025, it was announced that Gold's Gym would sell all of the SoCal locations except for the Venice location to EōS Fitness. Because of this, the Gold's Gym location at the mall was rebranded into EōS Fitness.

== Plaza West Covina today ==
Plaza West Covina is a large regional mall with 185 shops, stores, and restaurants. The mall is two levels and is anchored by Macy's (180,000 sq ft (17,000 m^{2})) to the east, JCPenney (193,963 sq ft (18,019.8 m^{2})) to the south, former Sears (137,820 sq ft (12,804 m^{2})) to the west, Best Buy (45,000 sq ft (4,200 m^{2})) to the north, the newly opened XXI Forever flagship store (to the north) and Nordstrom Rack. There is a food court on the second level as well as other restaurants, and other food & drink kiosks.

== Transit access ==
The mall is served by various Foothill Transit Bus Routes including the Silver Streak bus rapid transit.
