= El Monte station (Los Angeles Metro) =

Bus Station in El Monte, California

El Monte
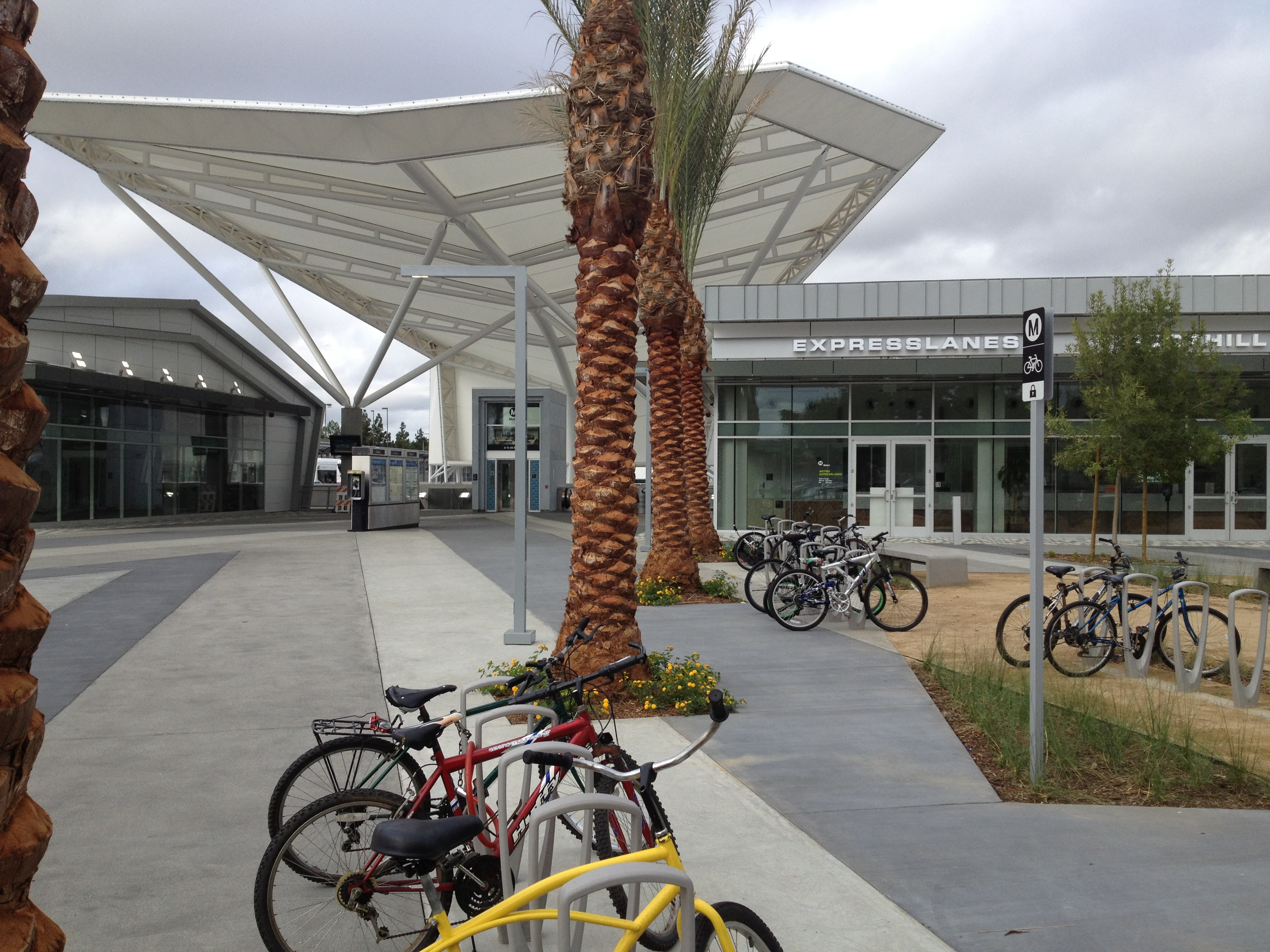
- El Monte station entrance plaza

General information
- Location: 3501 Santa Anita Avenue; El Monte, California
- Coordinates: 34°04′18″N 118°02′36″W
- Operator: Los Angeles Metro
- Platforms: 2 island platforms
- Bus stands: 29
- Connections: See Services section

Construction
- Parking: 1,287 spaces
- Cycle facilities: Metro Bike Hub and racks
- Accessible: Yes

History
- Opened: July 14, 1973
- Rebuilt: October 14, 2012

Passengers
- FY 2025: 1,811 (avg. wkdy boardings, J Line)

Services
Preceding station	Metro Busway	Following station
Cal State LA toward Harbor Gateway or San Pedro	J Line	Terminus
Preceding station	Foothill Transit	Following station
Cal State LA toward Downtown Los Angeles	Silver Streak	Pomona Transit Center (stops en route) toward Montclair
Location

El Monte station is a large regional bus station in the city of El Monte, California, located adjacent to Interstate 10. It serves the Los Angeles Metro Busway's J Line, as well as Foothill Transit, Greyhound Lines, and El Monte Transit buses. It is the J Line's eastern terminus.

== History ==
The El Monte Busway was conceived in 1969 as a way to allow travelers to avoid traffic on Interstate 10 (San Bernardino Freeway), promising an 18-minute trip between El Monte and Downtown Los Angeles, compared to 35–45 minutes in the general-purpose lanes. At the El Monte end of the line, a $945,000 terminal would be built, then described as the world's first bus rapid transit station. The station was described as having a "Space Age" design, stemming from its unique circular shape billed as providing easy access for buses from both directions. The station opened on July 14, 1973.

The service was popular and by 1975, El Monte station was serving 12,000 passengers per day. Commuters could park their cars in one of the parking lots, then hop on a bus for the traffic-free ride to downtown Los Angeles. The parking lots had to be expanded several times in order to meet demand. For those not in cars, the station was an important transit transfer point, in express service to downtown, local and express buses fanned out to the north, east and south of the station.

Ridership would continue to grow over the next few decades, and the station would continue to age. By 2006, the El Monte Busway was being used by 40,000 passengers on 1,100 bus trips per day, and El Monte station had become the busiest bus station west of Chicago and was operating well beyond its originally intended capacity. In an effort to relieve overcrowding, Metro opened six new bus bays in the parking lot just west of the main station in 2006.

Prior to 2007, most express routes passed through the station, but that year Foothill Transit reorganized its routes to require passengers to transfer to the Silver Streak to travel to downtown Los Angeles.

On December 13, 2009, Metro launched its second Metro Busway bus rapid transit service, the Silver Line (now J Line) utilizing both the El Monte Busway and the Harbor Transitway. The new higher frequency service would be funded by converting both corridors into high occupancy toll (HOT) lanes, to be branded as the Metro ExpressLanes. The tolls would be used to fund improvements to the aging stations along both corridors. Similar to Foothill Transit, express routes that once passed through the station were converted to local routes and passengers were required to transfer.

One of the first locations to be improved was El Monte station. In 2010, the old station was demolished and replaced a two-level terminal nearly twice the size. The new $60 million station would feature more bus bays, a large public plaza, a bicycle parking station, and customer service offices. The new station opened to the public on Sunday, October 14, 2012.

An art installation, titled "El Monte Legion Stadium Nocturne," debuted at the station in 2014. The work, by Vincent Ramos, commemorates local music and sports figures associated with Legion Stadium, an indoor arena that was demolished in 1974.

The station is a proposed stop on the second phase of the California High-Speed Rail project.

== Layout ==
The entrance to the station is located at the corner of Santa Anita Ave and Ramona Boulevard. The new layout of El Monte station features 17 new bus berths on the lower level and 12 additional berths on the upper level. The design of the station is such that there are no at grade crossings of passengers and buses. Although the upper level is at existing grade, passengers are required to descend into the lower level and return to the ground level.

Just west of this station the transitway moves off the separate right of way and moves into the middle of Interstate 10. The station has a 1,760 space park and ride lot. There are additional spaces in Downtown El Monte which can be used by commuters. The station also has a connection to the Rio Hondo bicycle trail, which is north of the station. Previously the station had a connection through the parking lot, but that was fenced off when construction of the new terminal began.

The Division 9 bus yard is located next to the bus station, and buses coming into, or going out of service, enter and leave from that yard.

== Services ==
With 22,000 passengers and 1,200 bus departures daily, the station was doubled in size in a renovation which was completed in October 2012. Of all the nine Metro J Line stations, El Monte station is the busiest and most served.

Staffed counters are available for Foothill Transit, Metro ExpressLanes, and Greyhound.

As of December 15, 2024, the following services are available:

- El Monte Transit: Civic Center, Flair Park, Green
- Foothill Transit: Silver Streak, 178, 190, 194, 269, 270, 282, 486, 488, 492
- Greyhound Lines
- Hollywood Bowl Shuttle
- Los Angeles Metro Bus: J Line (910 / 950), 70, 76, 267, 268, 287, Express 577, Metro Micro El Monte
- Norwalk Transit: 7

J Line buses run 24 hours a day between El Monte, Downtown Los Angeles, and the Harbor Gateway Transit Center, as route 910. Some trips continue to San Pedro between 6 a.m. and 8 p.m. and are signed as Route 950. On weekdays, buses operate every four to eight minutes during peak hours. They operate every 10 minutes in the midday, 20 minutes during evenings, 40 minutes during nights, and every hour overnight. On weekends, buses arrive every 15 minutes most of the day. They operate every 20 minutes during evenings, 40 minutes during nights, and every hour overnight.
