= Foothill Transit =

Public transit agency in California, US

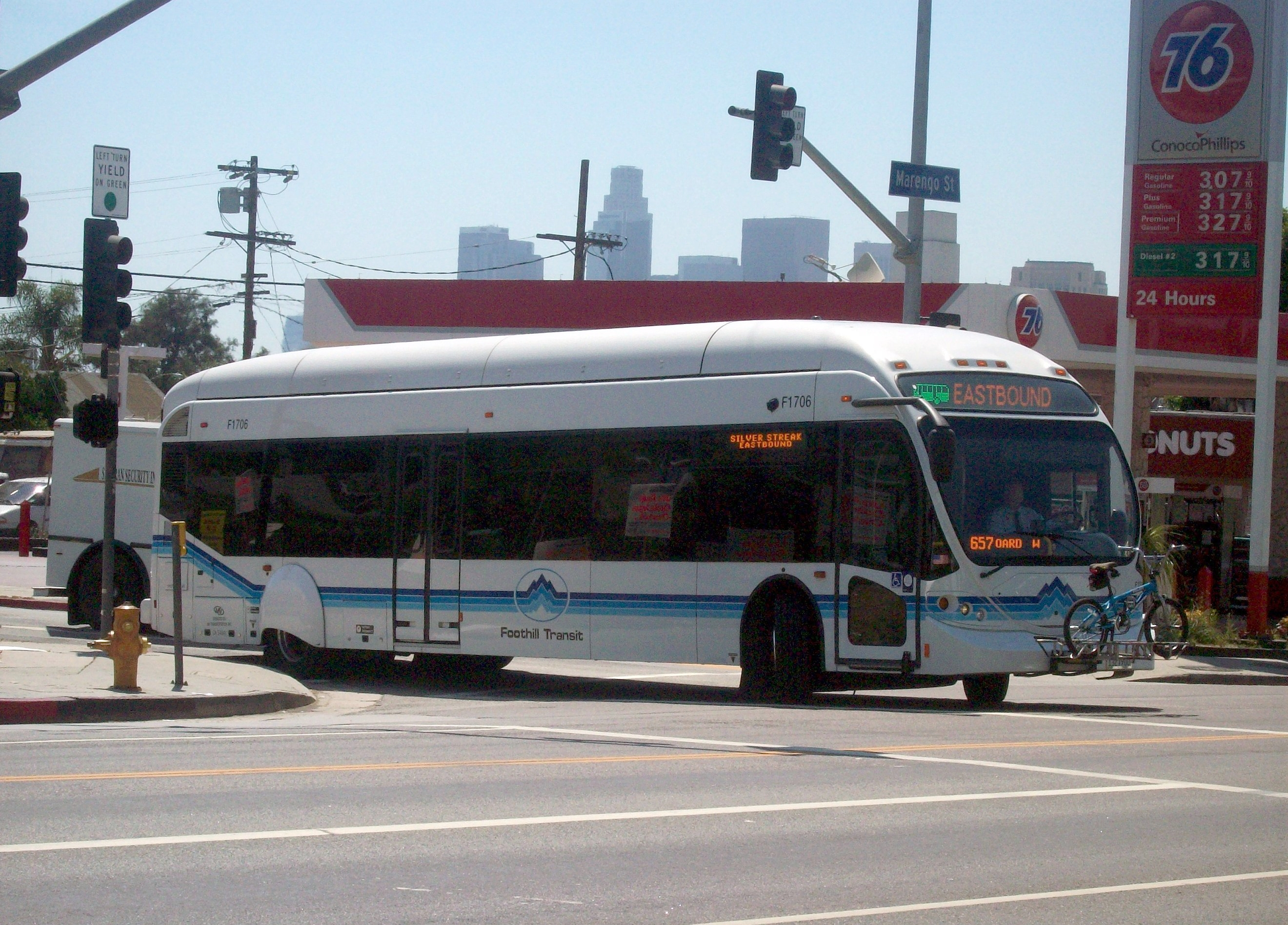
- Foothill Transit bus in Los Angeles
- Parent: Foothill Transit Agency
- Founded: 1988
- Headquarters: 100 South Vincent Ave; West Covina, California
- Service area: San Gabriel and Pomona Valleys
- Service type: Transit bus
- Routes: 37
- Fleet: 359 buses
- Daily ridership: 32,200 (weekdays, Q1 2026)
- Annual ridership: 10,073,800 (2025)
- Fuel type: CNG, battery electric, hydrogen fuel cell
- Operator: Transdev (Irwindale Yard); Keolis (Pomona Yard)
- Chief executive: Doran J. Barnes
- Website: foothilltransit.org

Foothill Transit is a public transit agency that is government funded by 22 member cities in the San Gabriel and Pomona valleys. It operates a fixed-route bus public transit service in the San Gabriel Valley region of eastern Los Angeles County, California, United States, as well as a rapid bus route to and from downtown Los Angeles from the El Monte Busway, and a few of its local routes reach the far northern and western edge cities of neighboring Orange and San Bernardino counties, respectively. In 2025, the system had a ridership of 10,073,800, or about 32,200 per weekday as of the first quarter of 2026.

== Overview ==
Foothill Transit Key Locations
1 Headquarters (100 S Vincent)
2 Pomona Yard (200 S East End)
3 Irwindale/Arcadia Yard (5640 Peck)

Foothill Transit operates out of two yards: one in Pomona (opened in 1997), and the other in Arcadia (opened in 2002); the administrative offices moved to West Covina in 2007. The Foothill Transit joint powers authority membership consists of elected representatives from 22 member cities in the San Gabriel Valley and Pomona Valley and three members appointed from the Los Angeles County Board of Supervisors. These representatives are divided into five geographical clusters, which each elect a representative annually to serve on a five-member executive board.

Foothill Transit Organization
Cluster 1	Cluster 2	Cluster 3	Cluster 4	Cluster 5
Claremont	Azusa	Arcadia	El Monte	LA County Supervisors
La Verne	Baldwin Park	Bradbury	Diamond Bar	LA County Supervisors
Pomona	Covina	Duarte	Industry	LA County Supervisors
San Dimas	Glendora	Monrovia	La Puente	LA County Supervisors
Walnut	Irwindale	Pasadena	South El Monte	LA County Supervisors
	West Covina	Temple City		LA County Supervisors

=== Funding ===
Foothill Transit is mainly funded by local sales tax revenue, with 75% coming from Los Angeles County Propositions A and C, California State Transportation Development Act, and the State Transit Assistance Fund. The remaining 25% comes from farebox revenue.

== History ==
Los Angeles County Supervisor Pete Schabarum is credited with the formation of the transit agency. Schabarum, annoyed by what he saw as disproportionate cutbacks of bus service by the Southern California Rapid Transit District (SCRTD) in the San Gabriel Valley, wanted to secede from the larger agency and form a separate transit agency as early as 1986. Compared to routes serving more densely populated areas, routes in the San Gabriel and Pomona Valleys required greater subsidies to serve fewer riders on longer freeway alignments in eastern Los Angeles County.

Foothill was initially founded by 20 member cities; Pasadena voted to join in 1998. In 1987, the Los Angeles County Transportation Commission (LACTC) approved Foothill to take over fourteen routes which serviced the San Gabriel Valley that were currently operated by SCRTD. Although service was planned to start on July 1, 1988, the Foothill Transit Zone had been prevented from starting service in July by an injunction arising from a lawsuit filed by the drivers and mechanics unions (United Transportation and Amalgamated Transit Unions) of SCRTD against LACTC. Los Angeles Superior Court Judge Eli Chernow ruled that LACTC could not unilaterally transfer the lines without the consent of the SCRTD board of directors. The injunction was upheld on appeal.

LACTC had begun withholding $9 million per month from SCRTD in April 1988 on the basis that SCRTD had not followed salary guidelines set by LACTC; SCRTD replied that LACTC, under the leadership of its chairman (Schabarum), was holding the funds hostage to pressure SCRTD to release the lines to Foothill Transit. SCRTD consented to Foothill Transit taking over the bus lines in December 1988 in return for the restoration of funding. Those first two lines operated by Foothill Transit were 495 and 498.

The trial for the lawsuit against Foothill Transit started in May 1989, was resolved in Foothill's favor by July, and the other twelve lines previously operated by SCRTD were transitioned to Foothill Transit between 1989 and 1992. For a short period in 1992, the last two routes to transition (486 and 488) were operated by both Foothill Transit and SCRTD during continued legal disputes. The drivers and mechanics unions disputed the transfer of 486 and 488 since SCRTD had made the decision without negotiating with the union; an arbitrator held up the unions' argument, which led to duplicated service on those lines, as "Foothill Transit [had] the legal right to operate buses on the contested routes, but the [SCRTD had] the legal obligation to do so", and the union planned to use that precedent to roll back service to SCRTD on all fourteen lines. However, Foothill Transit again prevailed in a February 1993 court ruling.

=== Contract labor ===
Schabarum, who hated the influence of trade unions, chose to use contractors to operate the service. All of the operations and maintenance work for Foothill Transit are contracted out. As of 2017, bus service is operated by Keolis at Pomona and Transdev at Arcadia/Irwindale.

Embree Bus Lines was the initial contractor that operated the first two lines for Foothill starting in December 1988. The hourly operating cost under Foothill Transit was reduced by up to half compared to service under SCRTD, and ridership grew, but the contract operator drivers generally earned less in both wages and fringe benefits, and had less influence over working conditions. In addition, Foothill Transit was not required to provide typical rider services such as schedules, bus stops, transit police, or telephone information. During the 1992 Los Angeles riots, Foothill Transit terminated service at El Monte rather than continue on to downtown Los Angeles. Over the first five years, Foothill Transit consistently saved money compared to SCRTD's historical costs. In 1994, Foothill reported their hourly cost of operations was $55, compared to $93 for the Los Angeles County Metropolitan Transportation Authority (Metro), with a farebox recovery ratio of 48% (compared to 32% for Metro) at a lower fare of $0.85 (compared to $1.10 for Metro, which was scheduled to increase to $1.35 later that year). In addition, Foothill reported an accident rate of 0.3 per 100,000 mi (160,000 km) traveled, compared to Metro's rate of 3.3 per 100,000 mi (160,000 km), although Metro's accident rate was skewed by older buses and more dense traffic in its operating area.

Foothill executives made the service essentially strike-proof by insisting that two different companies operate the two bus yards, even if it would cost more in the short term. By 1998, Foothill's contractors were Laidlaw and Ryder/ATE. However, due to bus industry consolidation, First Transit operated both yards from 2001 to mid-2007. Currently, both Foothill Transit yards are represented by unions (Arcadia by the Amalgamated Transit Union and Pomona by the Teamsters Union), but past strikes at the agency have been less than successful due to the ability of one yard to operate the other yard's service. In addition, wages are less at Foothill than at other transit operators in the region.

The contract operator drivers at Foothill were also represented by the Teamsters, but a 1994 Los Angeles Times article reported they earned an average of $11 per hour, compared to the average $18.45 per hour earned by Metro drivers. A representative of the union representing Metro's drivers, the United Transportation Union, accused Foothill of not paying its drivers a living wage; the president of the company that was then contracted to manage Foothill, William P. Forsythe, stated the US$20,000 (equivalent to $43,000 in 2025) typical annual pay of a Foothill driver "isn't bad for a service industry job" and admitted it wasn't fair "compared to MTA, but they've been overpaying for years." In January 1995, the Los Angeles Times reported the majority of the 150 drivers for Laidlaw made $8.50 per hour; those drivers, represented by the Teamsters, rejected a proposed contract that offered no wage increases.

Laidlaw, which was responsible for approximately half of Foothill's fleet, operated out of the Upland Yard. The first strike against Foothill Transit started when Laidlaw drivers walked off in February 1996, asking for an immediate $1/hour raise and full medical coverage. Teamsters Local 848 officials stated that drivers could not afford private health insurance, and had to rely on county services instead. Foothill's other contractor was not affected and continued normal operations during the strike. The strike ended after thirteen days, when drivers accepted a 3% pay raise with no health coverage on a one-year contract under the threat they would be fired and replaced if they did not return to work. Shortly after the expiration of the contract, Laidlaw drivers went on strike again in June 1997, but that strike was settled within hours, as most drivers were no longer represented by the union. The reported average wages in 1998 was $9.30 per hour for Ryder/ATE drivers (represented by the Teamsters), and $9.06 per hour for Laidlaw drivers (who had previously voted to become an open shop).

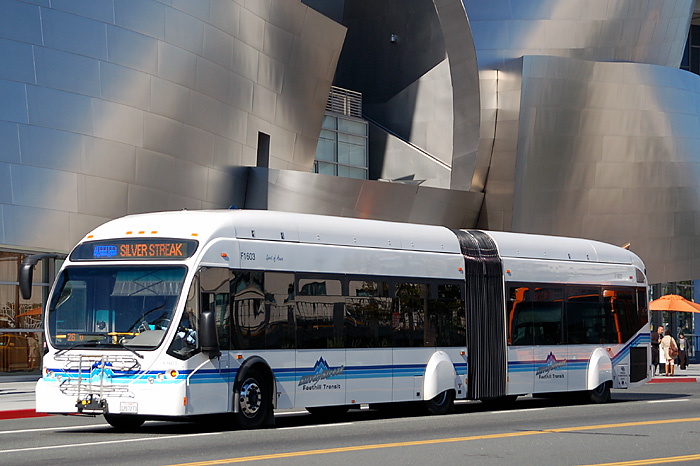
Silver Streak bus in front of Walt Disney Concert Hall in 2008

In 2007, Foothill Transit introduced the San Gabriel Valley's first bus rapid transit line, the Silver Streak. The service was described in the 2006-07 budget as a "bus system which operates like a rail line on rubber tires" with all-door boarding and limited stops.

Effective July 1, 2013, due to expiration of the existing management services contract and continuing conflicts of interest between the executive director, staff, and board, Foothill Transit transitioned to in house management. Executive Director Doran Barnes became the first full-time Foothill employee, and planning, procurement, and other administrative functions became Foothill functions as well. Transdev (formerly Veolia) staff continues to operate the transit stores and maintain bus shelters.

The last two lines operated by Metro (SCRTD's successor) in the eastern San Gabriel Valley were turned over to Foothill in 2016.

In 2017, Foothill Transit hired two new contractors, Keolis and Transdev, both of which are French transportation companies, to manage both of their bus storage yards. Keolis took over First Transit's role in managing the Pomona Yard and Transdev took over the Irwindale Yard.

=== Environmental initiatives ===
In 2002, Foothill Transit began purchasing Compressed Natural Gas (CNG) powered buses. In 2010, Foothill Transit was the first transit system to operate an all-electric battery-powered bus from Proterra. By 2013, when the last diesel-powered buses were retired, Foothill Transit had a 90 percent CNG fleet, with the remaining 10 percent of the fleet being electric.

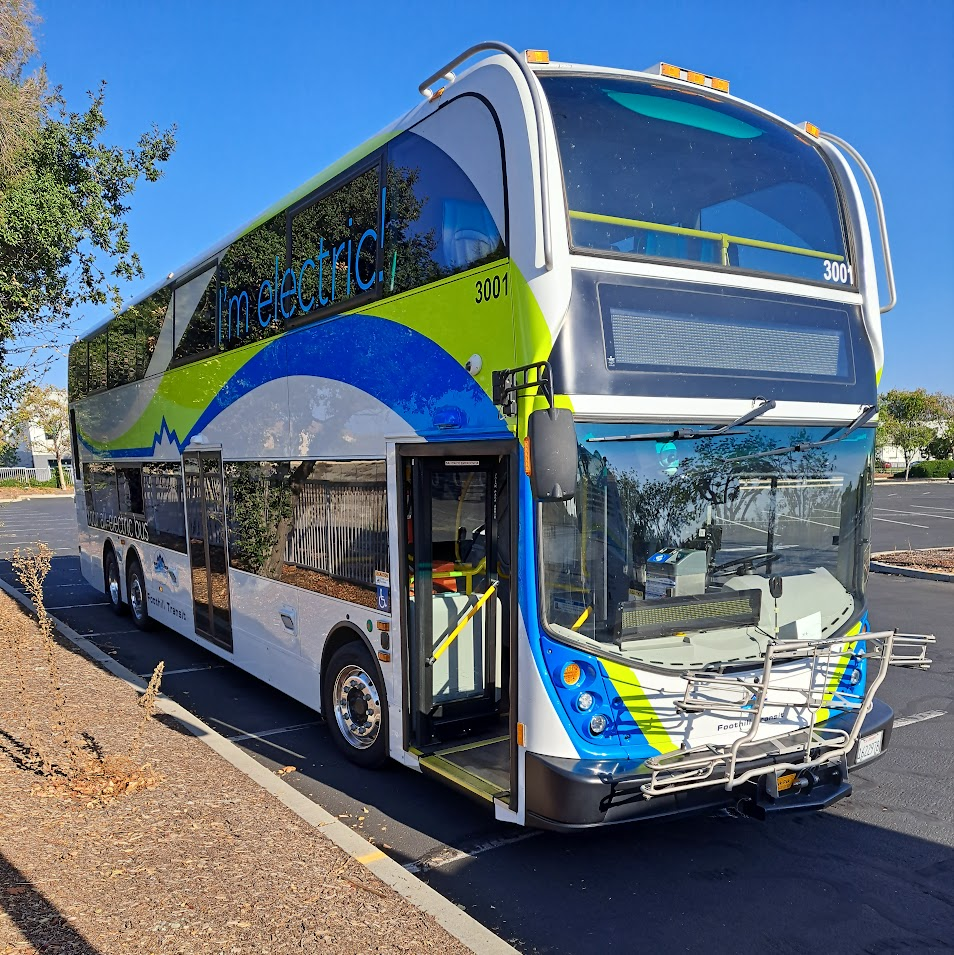
Double-decker Foothill Transit bus

Foothill Transit's main goal is to be fully electric by 2030. On January 25, 2021, Foothill Transit received its first two all-electric double-decker buses, which were made by Alexander Dennis in the United Kingdom.

During its transition to an all-electric fleet, Foothill Transit suffered a thirty-four percent electric fleet failure rate. The transit system blamed its fleet vendor for the lack of spare parts. Other units stalled while in revenue service. In the fiscal year 2020, sixty-seven percent of its electric fleet failed to properly operate. Most of the buses had to wait three hundred days for replacement parts.

In 2021, Foothill Transit voted in retire its fleet of electric buses early, paying $5 million to the Federal Transit Administration for violating its funding requirements. That year, Foothill Transit ordered 13 hydrogen fuel cell buses from New Flyer to replace its electric buses. The fuel cell buses began revenue service in December 2022.

== Routes ==
=== Local routes ===
Route	Terminals		via	Notes
178	El Monte; El Monte station	City of Industry; Puente Hills Mall	Los Angeles St, Pacific Av, Valinda Av, Nogales St, Colima Rd	Selected trips serve the Baldwin Park Metrolink Station; Serves Plaza West Covina
185	Azusa; San Gabriel Av & Sierra Madre Av	City of Industry; Puente Hills Mall	Irwindale Av, Glendora Av, Hacienda Bl, Colima Rd	Serves Azusa Downtown station, Irwindale station and Plaza West Covina
187	Pasadena; Raymond Av & Walnut St	Azusa; Azusa Intermodal Transit Center	Colorado Bl, Foothill Bl, Rosemead Bl, Huntington Dr, Foothill Bl	Serves The Shops at Santa Anita, USC Arcadia Hospital and Santa Anita Park
188	Azusa; Azusa Intermodal Transit Center	Montclair; Montclair Transit Center	Rt 66, Foothill Bl	Serves Citrus College, Azusa Pacific University, Claremont Colleges, Claremont Transit Center and Claremont Metrolink Station
190	El Monte; El Monte station	Pomona; Cal Poly Pomona	Ramona Bl	Serves Eastland Center and Mt. San Antonio College Transit Center
194	El Monte; El Monte station	Pomona; Cal Poly Pomona	Valley Bl	Serves Mt. San Antonio College Transit Center
195	Pomona; Cal Poly Pomona	Pomona; Pomona Transit Center	Temple Av, Rio Rancho Rd, Reservoir St	
197	Montclair; Montclair Transit Center	Pomona; Pomona Transit Center	Arrow Hwy, White Av, Fairplex Dr, Orange Grove Av	Serves La Verne/Fairplex station and Fairplex Park & Ride
269	El Monte; El Monte station	Montebello; The Shops at Montebello	Santa Anita Av, Durfee Av	Serves Whittier Narrows Recreation Area
270	El Monte; El Monte station	Arcadia; Arcadia station	Peck Rd, Myrtle Av, Primrose Av, Foothill Bl	Serves Monrovia station
272	Duarte; Mountain Vista Plaza	West Covina; Plaza West Covina	Buena Vista St, Baldwin Park Bl, Merced Av	Serves Duarte/City of Hope station
274	Whittier; Beverly Bl & Norwalk Bl	West Covina; Plaza West Covina	Workman Mill Rd, Puente Av	Serves Rio Hondo College
280	Azusa; Azusa Intermodal Transit Center	City of Industry; Puente Hills Mall	Azusa Av	
281	Glendora; Citrus College	City of Industry; Puente Hills Mall	Citrus Av, Cameron Av, Sunset Av, Gale Av	Serves Covina Transit Center, Covina Metrolink Station and Plaza West Covina
282	El Monte; El Monte station	City of Industry; Puente Hills Mall	Valley Bl, 7th Av, Gale Av, Colima Rd	
284	Glendora; Citrus College	West Covina; Eastland Center	Foothill Bl, Lone Hill Av	Serves Glendora station
285	City of Industry; Puente Hills Mall	La Habra; Beach Bl & La Habra Bl	Hacienda Bl, Colima Rd, Whitter Bl	
286	Pomona; Pomona Transit Center	Brea; Brea Mall	Mission Bl, Diamond Bar Bl, SR 57	
289	City of Industry; Puente Hills Mall	Pomona; Cal Poly Pomona	Colima Rd, La Puente Rd	Serves Mt. San Antonio College Transit Center
291	La Verne; Durward Wy & D St	Pomona; Pomona Ranch Plaza	Rio Rancho Rd, Garey Av, Foothill Bl	Serves Pomona North station and Pomona Transit Center
292	Pomona; Pomona Transit Center	Claremont; Claremont Transit Center	Arrow Hwy	Serves Claremont Metrolink Station and Claremont Colleges
295	Walnut; Mt. San Antonio College Transit Center	San Dimas; San Dimas station	Temple Av, SR 57, San Dimas Av	Weekdays only; Serves Cal Poly Pomona
480	West Covina; Plaza West Covina	Montclair; Montclair Transit Center	Walnut, Mission Bl, Indian Hill Bl	Serves Mt. San Antonio College Transit Center, Cal Poly Pomona, Pomona Transit Center, Claremont Metrolink Station, Claremont Transit Center and Claremont College
482	City of Industry; Puente Hills Mall	Pomona; Pomona Transit Center	Colima Rd, Golden Springs Dr, Diamond Bar Bl	Serves Cal Poly Pomona
486	El Monte; El Monte station	Pomona; Pomona Transit Center	Garvey Av, Amar Rd	Serves Mt. San Antonio College Transit Center and Cal Poly Pomona
488	El Monte; El Monte station	Glendora; Citrus College	Ramona Bl, Francisquito Av, Grand Av	Serves Plaza West Covina and Eastland Center
492	El Monte; El Monte station	Montclair; Montclair Transit Center	Santa Anita Av, Arrow Hwy, Bonita Av	Serves Claremont Metrolink Station, Claremont Colleges and Claremont Transit Center
861	Duarte; Mountain Vista Plaza		Mountain Av, Royal Oaks Dr	Operated as Duarte eBus line by contract for the City of Duarte; Serves Duarte/City of Hope station

=== Express routes ===
Express services operate weekdays only in the peak direction, excluding the Silver Streak.

Route	Terminals		via	Notes
Silver Streak	Downtown LA; Pico Bl & Flower St	Montclair; Montclair Transit Center	El Monte Busway, I-10	Serves Cal Poly Pomona from 7 a.m. until 9 p.m. on weekdays only.; Serves Civic Center/Grand Park Station, Los Angeles Union Station, Los Angeles General Medical Center, Cal State LA, El Monte station, Plaza West Covina and Pomona Transit Center; 24-hour service.
490	Downtown LA; Figueroa St & 9th St	Glendora; Grand Ave Park & Ride	El Monte Busway, I-10, Grand Av	Serves Civic Center/Grand Park Station, Los Angeles Union Station, Los Angeles General Medical Center and Cal State LA
490	Downtown LA; Figueroa St & 9th St	Covina; Covina Transit Center	El Monte Busway, I-10, Grand Av	Serves Civic Center/Grand Park Station, Los Angeles Union Station, Los Angeles General Medical Center and Cal State LA
493	Downtown LA; Figueroa St & 9th St	Rowland Heights; Colima Rd & Fairway Dr	El Monte Busway, I-10, I-605, SR 60, Colima Rd.	Service may operate on Valley Bl if SR 60 is congested.; Serves Civic Center/Grand Park Station, Los Angeles Union Station, Los Angeles General Medical Center, Cal State LA and Puente Hills Mall
495	Downtown LA; Figueroa St & 9th St	City of Industry; Industry Park & Ride	El Monte Busway, I-10, I-605, SR 60, Brea Canyon Rd	Service may operate on Valley Bl if SR 60 is congested.; Serves Civic Center/Grand Park Station, Los Angeles Union Station, Los Angeles General Medical Center and Cal State LA
498	Downtown LA; Figueroa St & 9th St	West Covina; West Covina City Hall Park and Ride	El Monte Busway, I-10,	Serves Civic Center/Grand Park Station, Los Angeles Union Station, Los Angeles General Medical Center and Cal State LA
499	Downtown LA; Figueroa St & 9th St	San Dimas; Via Verde Park & Ride	El Monte Busway, I-10	Serves Civic Center/Grand Park Station, Los Angeles Union Station, Los Angeles General Medical Center and Cal State LA
699	Downtown LA; Figueroa St & 9th St	Montclair; Montclair Transit Center	El Monte Busway, I-10	Serves Civic Center/Grand Park Station, Los Angeles Union Station, Los Angeles General Medical Center, Cal State LA and Fairplex Park & Ride

=== Other services ===
Route	Terminals		via	Notes
686	Pasadena; Rose Bowl Stadium	Pasadena; Parsons Corporation parking lot	Fair Oaks Av	Operates for UCLA Football home games, the annual Rose Bowl Game, and other special events at the Rose Bowl.

=== School supplementary routes ===
Route	Terminals		via	Notes
853	Diamond Bar; Copley Dr & Golden Springs Dr	Diamond Bar; Diamond Ranch High School	Golden Springs Dr	Operates school days only.

=== Fares and passes ===
Fare type	One-way	Passes			
Fare type	One-way	1-day	10-trip	31-day	EZ Transit
Adult Local + Silver Streak	$1.75	$6	$14	$60	$110
Student Local + Silver Streak	$1	$4	$8	$40	N/A
Children	Free	Free	Free	Free	Free
Senior/Persons with Disabilities/Medicare Local	$0.75	$3	$6	$30	$42
Access	Free	Free	Free	Free	Free
Commuter Express	$5.50	~~-~~	$44	$180	$220

=== Transfers ===
Free 2-Hour Foothill Transit to Foothill Transit local transfers. (Lines 490, 493, 495, 498, 499, and 699), you’ll have to pay the full fare.

Fare
Transfers	$0.50
Discount Transfers	$0.25
Transfers to other partner agencies	Varies

== Fleet ==
As of 2025, the Foothill Transit fleet consists of a mixed fleet of NABI, New Flyer, ENC, Proterra and Alexander Dennis buses. These include the Xcelsior, NABI BRT, Enviro500, ElDorado National Axess, and Proterra Catalyst buses. Foothill Transit uses various propulsion systems to power their buses, which are CNG, hydrogen, and electric. Foothill Transit uses articulated New Flyer XN60 buses as well as two Double Decker Alexander Dennis Enviro500EVs for use on the Silver Streak line. As of 2024, the transit agency has an additional twelve Alexander Dennis Enviro500EVs on order.
