= Vermont station =

Vermont station may refer to:

== Rail stations in Los Angeles ==
- Expo/Vermont station
- Vermont/Beverly station
- Vermont/Athens station
- Vermont/Santa Monica station
- Vermont/Sunset station
- Wilshire/Vermont station

== Radio stations in Vermont ==
- List of radio stations in Vermont
