= Vermont Transit Corridor =

Future bus line in Los Angeles, California

Overview
- Status: BRT under construction
- Stations: 13

Service
- Type: Bus rapid transit Rapid transit (future)
- System: Metro Busway

Technical
- Line length: 12.5 miles (20.1 km)

The Vermont Transit Corridor is a under construction 12.5-mile (20.1 km) bus rapid transit line in the Metro Busway network in Los Angeles, California with plans to convert it to rapid transit in the future. It is planned to operate on a north-to-south route on Vermont Avenue between the B Line's Vermont/Sunset station and the C Line's Vermont/Athens station on the Los Angeles Metro Rail system. The project feasibility study was released in February 2019 with a proposed completion date of 2028 for BRT and after 2067 for rail. It is part of Metro's Twenty-eight by '28 initiative and is partially funded by Measure M. The route will have signal priority at traffic lights and will have a dedicated right of way. Metro reports the initial cost is $425 million.

== Recent developments ==
In early 2025, LA Metro released a strategic three-phase plan for implementing dedicated bus lanes along Vermont Avenue. The plan details near-term, mid-term, and long-term improvements aimed at enhancing bus service, including the installation of curbside bus lanes, signal priority measures, and upgraded station infrastructure.

On March 19, 2025, Metro's Planning and Programming Committee considered a recommendation to approve a statutory exemption from the California Environmental Quality Act (CEQA) for the Vermont Transit Corridor project under Senate Bill 922. The Metro Board subsequently approved the exemption and selected the locally preferred alternative on March 27, 2025, allowing the project to proceed without a conventional CEQA environmental impact report while continuing the separate federal environmental review process under the National Environmental Policy Act (NEPA).

On March 27, 2025, the Metro Board approved the locally preferred alternative (LPA) for the Vermont Transit Corridor project, selecting a 12.4-mile side-running bus rapid transit (BRT) line with 26 stations at 13 major intersections. The project was determined to be exempt from the California Environmental Quality Act (CEQA) under Senate Bill 922, which facilitates the approval of sustainable transit initiatives. With this designation, Metro is now proceeding with the National Environmental Policy Act (NEPA) review and advancing into preliminary engineering to further develop the project design.

In the summer of 2026, Metro secured an additional $150 million in federal funds to commence work.

On October 21, 2026, Metro broke ground on construction for the line.

== History ==
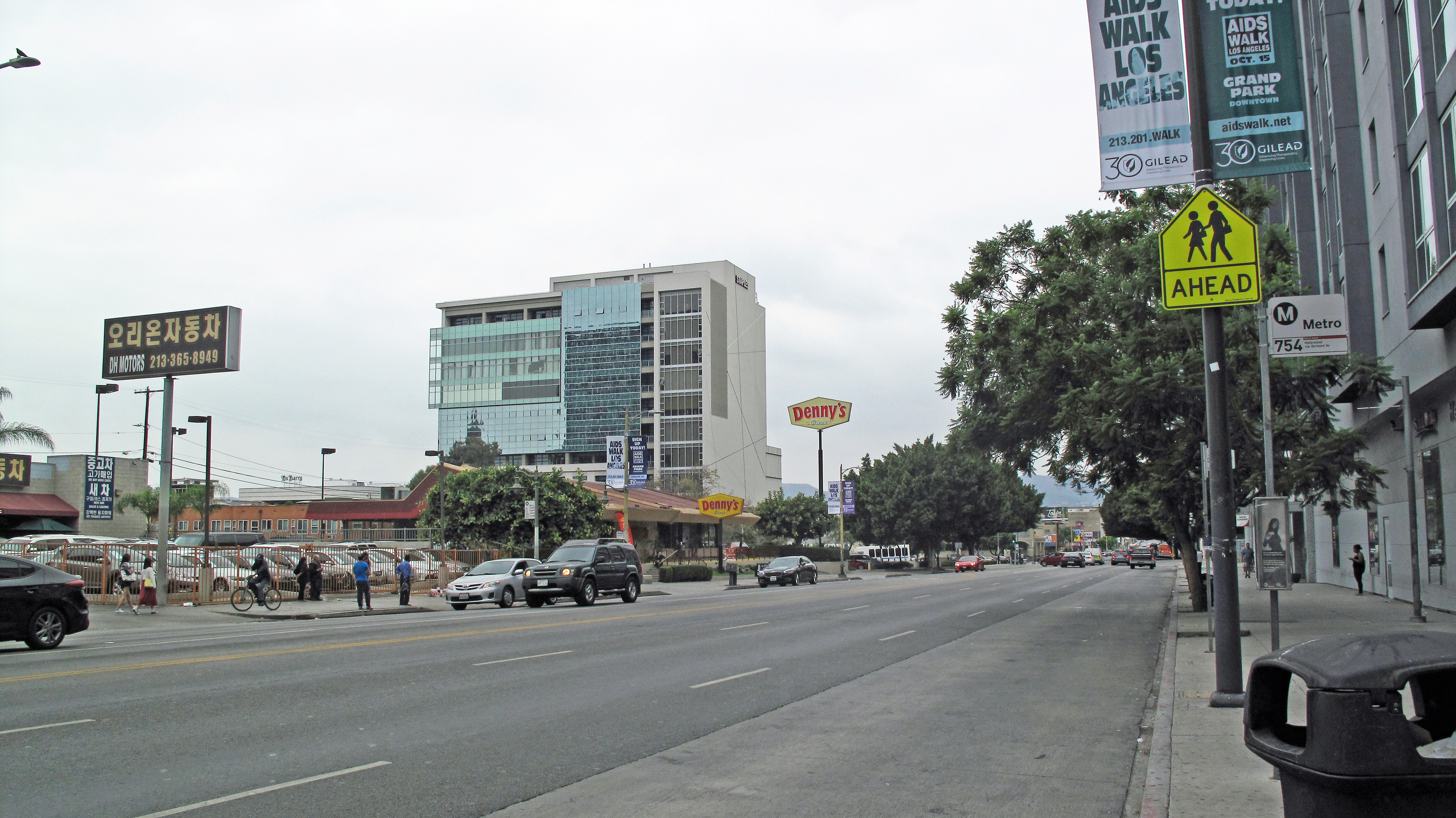
Vermont between Wilshire and 6th, 2017

Until 1963, Vermont Avenue was served by several Los Angeles Railway Yellow Car streetcar lines: the F, K, R, S, U, and V. After streetcars ceased running under the Los Angeles Metropolitan Transit Authority, tracks were torn up, and buses replaced service.

As of 2020 Vermont is the second busiest bus corridor in ridership, with 45,000 boarding per work day. Metro estimates this BRT will have 75,000-weekday boardings once completed. For that reason, light rail and subway options are also being developed. Metro is looking for ways to accelerate the option. Rail-based options are not scheduled to receive Measure R funds until after 2067.

== Initial alternative analysis ==
Two alternative analyses were developed.

=== Bus rapid transit ===
Metro currently plans to construct bus rapid transit with various stations along its route. Each will be spaced about one mile (1.6 km) apart. Metro studied three options for BRT:

- "side running"
- "side-center running"
- A technical study will also look at an entirely "center-running" option.

These feasibility options were sent to formal environmental review status. A Draft Environmental Impact Report (DEIR) was never released for the BRT project because the current phase was granted a statutory CEQA exemption under California Senate Bill 922. The Metro Board formally approved the project's California Environmental Quality Act (CEQA) exemption and its Locally Preferred Alternative (LPA) in March 2025. This allowed the project to bypass a lengthy traditional environmental impact report process and proceed directly into final design and construction.

=== Rail ===
For rail, concepts have been published in the feasibility study. Measure M funds for rail are expected to become available after 2067.

The following concepts were published:

- A light rail concept would cost $2.7 to 3.2 billion. Underground sections are required between Wilshire Boulevard and Gage Avenue.
- A heavy rail concept would cost $3.7 to 4.4 billion with five new underground stations. A new junction and platform under Wilshire/Vermont station would make the line a continuation of the B Line. This would feature a one-seat underground ride from North Hollywood to South Los Angeles.

== Route ==
The corridor includes Vermont Avenue between Hollywood Boulevard and 120th Street. Destinations along the route include Exposition Park and its museums Lucas Museum of Narrative Art, the Natural History Museum and the California Science Center. Also, local sports stadiums, the Los Angeles Memorial Coliseum and BMO Stadium. USC is along the route. It would also connect with the E Line at Expo/Vermont station.

The following table shows potential BRT metro stations, per feasibility study from north to south. Also listed are existing light rail and subway stations.

Station options	Alt 1 BRT	Alt 2 LRT	Alt 3 HRT	Connecting services	Community	Notes
Vermont/Sunset	check	-	check	B Line	Little Armenia, East Hollywood	Existing subway station
Vermont/Santa Monica	check	-	check	B Line	Little Armenia, East Hollywood	Existing subway station
Vermont/Beverly	-	-	check	B Line	Wilshire Center	Existing subway station
Vermont/3rd Street	check	-	-		Koreatown	
Wilshire/Vermont	check	check	check	B Line; D Line	Koreatown	Existing subway station
Vermont/Pico	check	check	check		Pico-Union	
Vermont/Adams	check	-	-		West Adams	
Expo/Vermont	check	check	check	E Line	Expo Park, USC	Existing light rail station
Vermont/Vernon	check	-	-		South Los Angeles	
Vermont/Slauson	check	check	check		South Los Angeles	
Vermont/Florence	check	check	-		South Los Angeles	
Vermont/Manchester	check	check	check		Vermont Vista	
Vermont/Century	check	check	-		Vermont Vista	
Vermont/Athens	check	check	check	C Line	Athens/Vermont Vista	Existing light rail station
Vermont/120th Street	-	check	check		Harbor Gateway, Los Angeles Southwest College/Vermont Vista	Future layover for BRT

== South Bay extension ==
Metro is also conducting a BRT, LRT, and HRT feasibility study to extend the route a further ten miles (16 km) past 120th Street south along Vermont Avenue to Ken Malloy Harbor Regional Park terminating at Pacific Coast Highway.

Nearby destinations would include Los Angeles Harbor College, Kaiser Permanente South Bay Medical Center, and Pacific Coast Highway station (J Line).

A feasibility study was conducted and released in 2023. Metro staff recommended no further study be conducted. Incremental BRT and rail service was recommended once BRT or Rail service has begun on the full corridor.
