= Expo/Vermont station =

Los Angeles Metro Rail station

Expo/Vermont
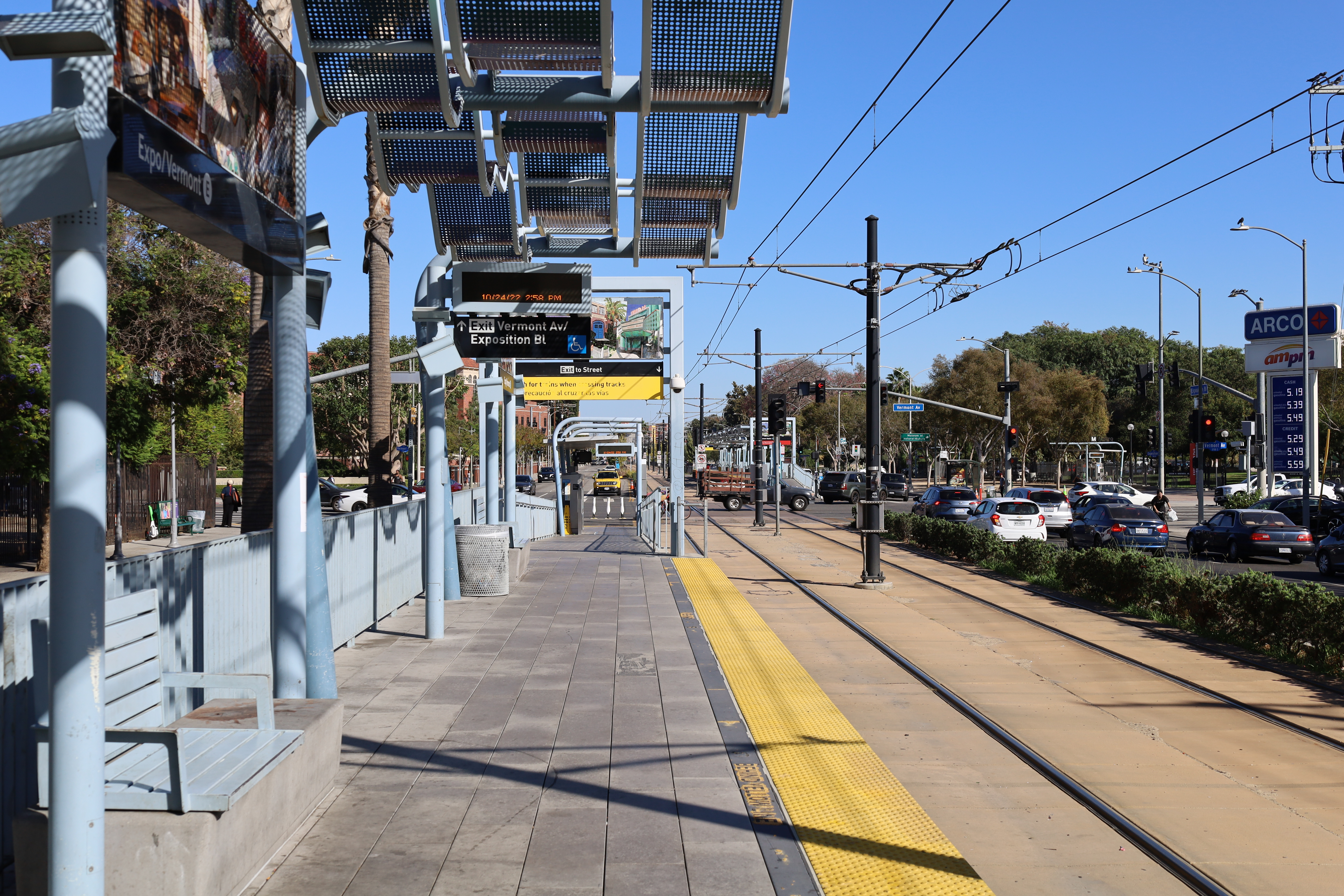
- Expo/Vermont station platform in 2022

General information
- Location: 1043 West Exposition Boulevard; Los Angeles, California
- Coordinates: 34.0182°N 118.2916°W
- Owner: Los Angeles County Metropolitan Transportation Authority
- Platforms: 2 farside side platforms
- Tracks: 2
- Connections: LADOT DASH; Los Angeles Metro Bus

Construction
- Structure type: At-grade
- Cycle facilities: Metro Bike Share station and racks
- Accessible: Yes

History
- Opened: October 17, 1875
- Rebuilt: April 28, 2012
- Former names: Vermont Avenue

Passengers
- FY 2026: 2,825 (avg. wkdy boardings)

Services
Preceding station	Metro Rail	Following station
Expo/Western toward Santa Monica	E Line	Expo Park/USC toward East LA
Former services
Preceding station	Pacific Electric	Following station
Western toward Rustic Canyon	Air Line	University toward Pacific Electric Building
Preceding station	Los Angeles Railway	Following station
Vermont and 37th toward Los Angeles City College	V	Vermont and 39th toward Pacific Crossing
Future services
Preceding station	Metro Busway	Following station
Adams toward Sunset	Vermont Transit Corridor	Vernon toward Athens
Location

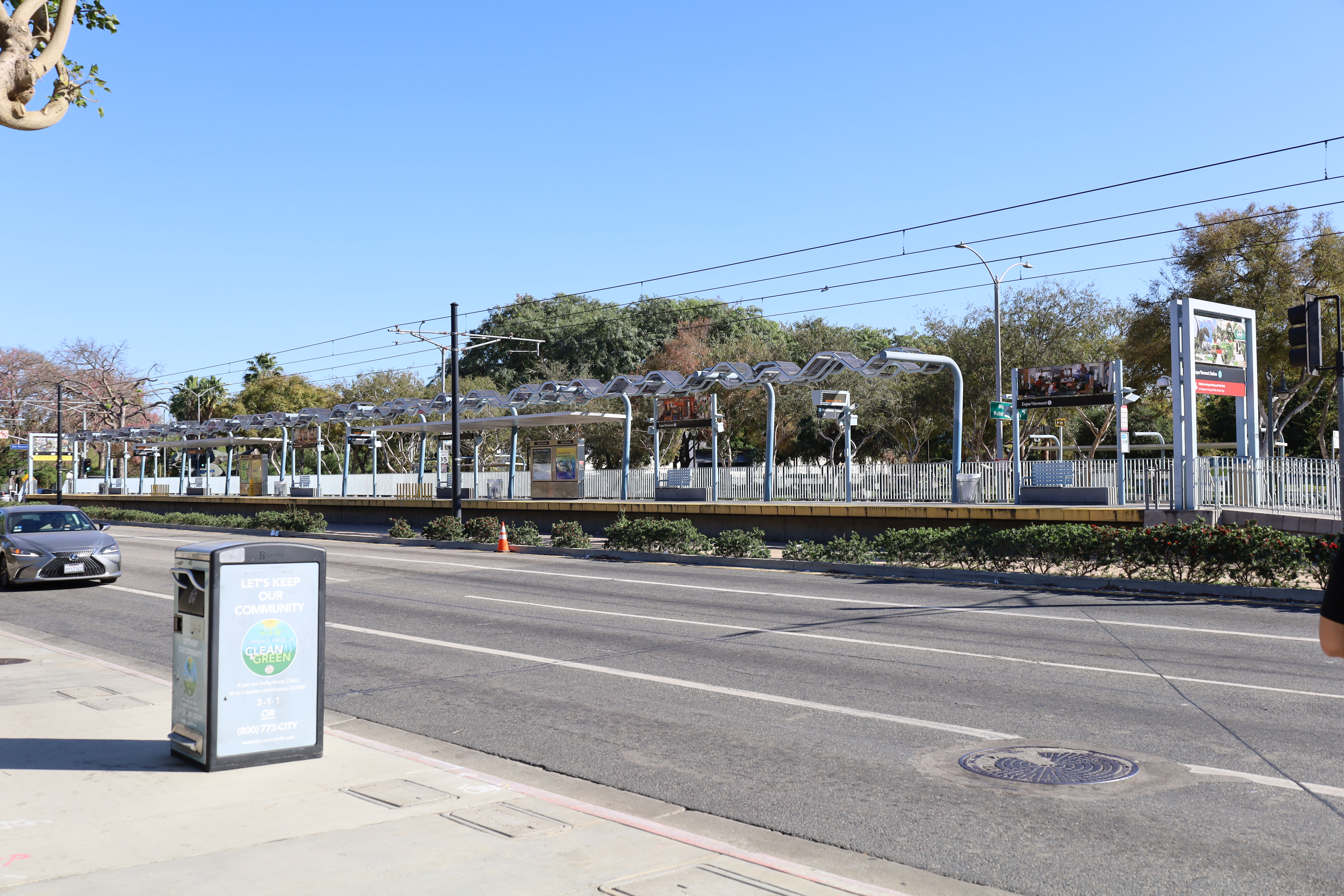
The station in 2022

Expo/Vermont station is an at-grade light rail station on the E Line of the Los Angeles Metro Rail system. The station is located in the center median of Exposition Boulevard at its intersection with Vermont Avenue, after which the station is named, near the Exposition Park and West Adams neighborhoods of Los Angeles.

The station is located close to the University of Southern California (USC), and several major museums and sporting venues inside Exposition Park. During the 2028 Summer Olympics, the station will serve spectators traveling to and from venues around Exposition Park.

The station will be a transfer point to the Vermont Transit Corridor, a Los Angeles Metro Busway line scheduled to open just before the 2028 Summer Olympics.

== History ==
The site was originally a junction of the Los Angeles and Independence and Pacific Electric railroads. It was an interchange between the Vernon–Vermont yellow car and Santa Monica Air Line red car. Service ceased on September 30, 1953, with the end of passenger service on the Santa Monica Air Line.

The station re-opened on Saturday, April 28, 2012. It was completely rebuilt for the opening of the Expo Line from little more than a station stop marker. Regular scheduled service resumed Monday, April 30, 2012.

== Service ==
=== Station layout ===
The station has "farside" platforms, this means that the platforms are positioned on opposite sides of the intersection, and trains stop at the platform after crossing the intersection.

=== Hours and frequency ===
E Line service hours are from approximately 4:30 a.m. and 11:45 p.m daily. Trains operate every 8 minutes during peak hours, Monday to Friday. Trains run every 10 minutes, during midday on weekdays and weekends, from 9:00 a.m. to 7:00 p.m. Night and early morning service is approximately every 20 minutes every day.

=== Connections ===
As of December 15, 2024, the following connections are available:

- LADOT DASH: F
- Los Angeles Metro Bus: 102, 204, Express 550 (weekday rush hours), Rapid 754

=== Future ===
A future station is planned for the Vermont Transit Corridor at Expo/Vermont station, connecting with the E Line.

== Notable places nearby ==
The station is within walking distance of the following notable places:

- California Science Center
- Exposition Park
- Los Angeles Memorial Coliseum (home of USC Trojans Football)
- Lucas Museum of Narrative Art
- Natural History Museum of Los Angeles County
- University of Southern California
- BMO Stadium
- California African American Museum

== Station artwork ==
The station's art, commissioned by the Los Angeles County Metropolitan Transportation Authority, was created by artist Jessica Polzin McCoy. According to the Los Angeles Times, the Vermont/Expo station features "hundreds of photographs of the West Adams district for a 24-panel piece titled "Neighborhood Portrait: Reconstructed". After constructing collages from her photos, McCoy then created intricate watercolor paintings of each collage. Artisans at Montreal-based Mosaika Art & Design worked closely with the artist to translate her watercolors into hand-glazed ceramic mosaic panels.
