= Wilshire/Vermont station =

Rapid transit station in Los Angeles, California

Wilshire/Vermont
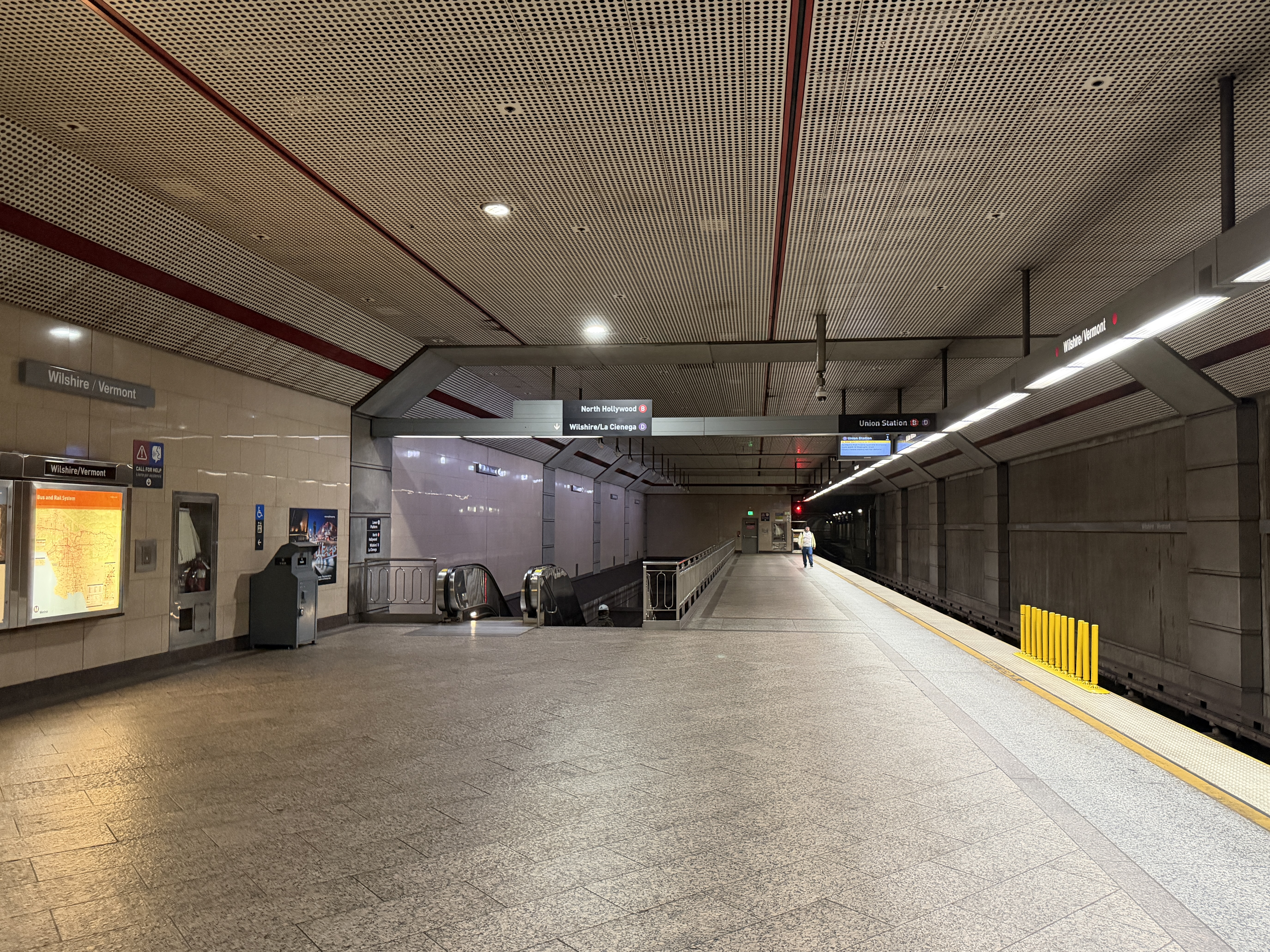
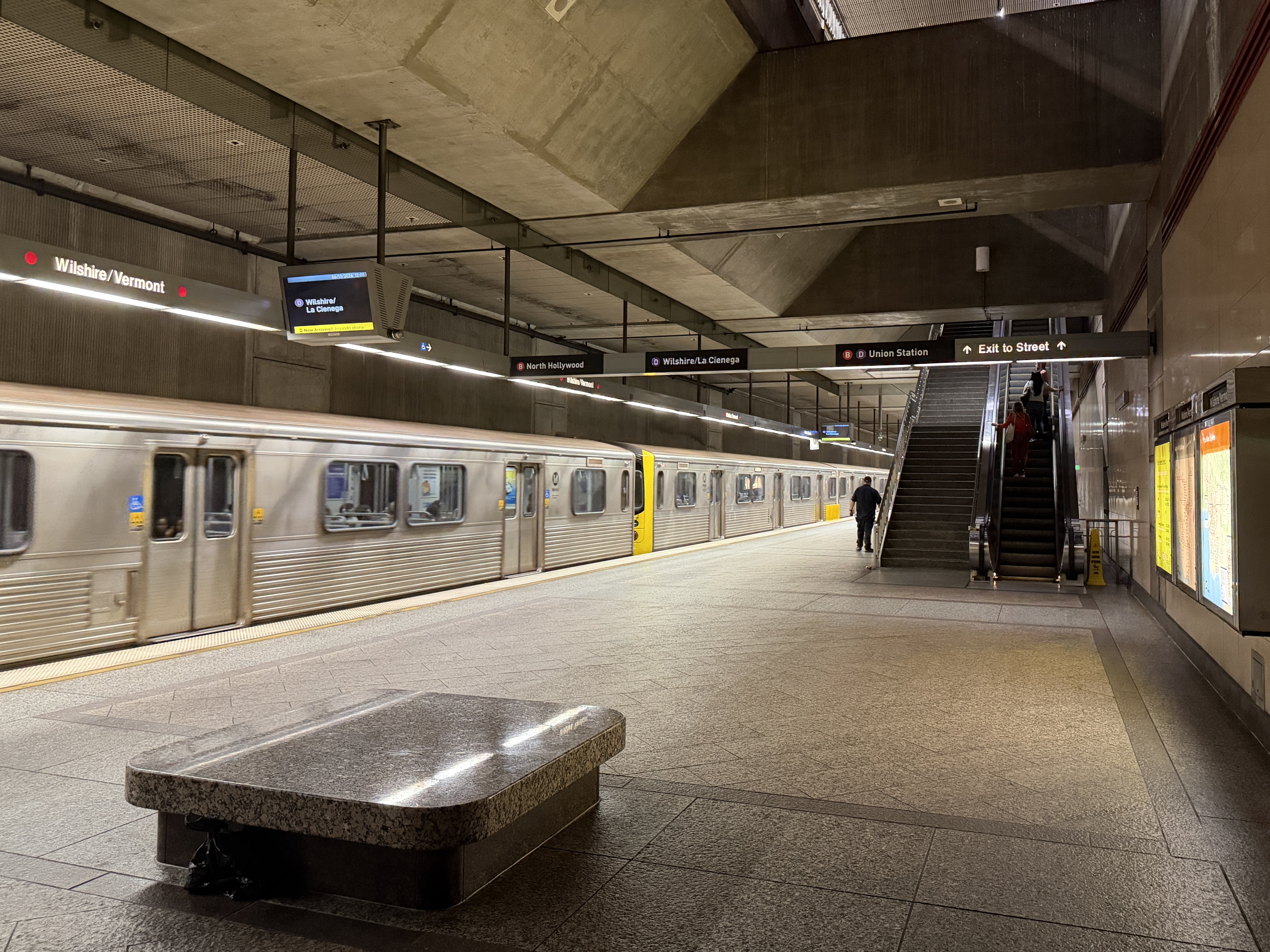
- Top: Upper floor platform bound for Union Station (top); Bottom: Lower floor platform bound for North Hollywood (B Line) or Wilshire/La Cienega (D Line)

General information
- Location: 3191 Wilshire Boulevard; Los Angeles, California
- Coordinates: 34.0625°N 118.2908°W
- Owner: Los Angeles Metro
- Platforms: 2 split platforms
- Tracks: 2
- Connections: Los Angeles Metro Bus; LADOT DASH

Construction
- Structure type: Underground
- Parking: Paid parking nearby
- Cycle facilities: Metro Bike Share station and racks

History
- Opened: July 13, 1996; 30 years ago
- Former names: Wilshire/Vermont/Wilshire Center

Passengers
- FY 2026: 5,582 (avg. wkdy boardings)

Services
Preceding station	Metro Rail	Following station
Vermont/Beverly toward North Hollywood	B Line	Westlake/MacArthur Park toward Union Station
Wilshire/Normandie toward Wilshire/La Cienega	D Line	Westlake/MacArthur Park toward Union Station
Future services
Preceding station	Metro Busway	Following station
3rd Street toward Sunset	Vermont Transit Corridor	Pico toward Athens
Location

Wilshire/Vermont station is an underground rapid transit station on the B Line and D Line of the Los Angeles Metro Rail system. The station is located near the intersection of Wilshire Boulevard and Vermont Avenue, after which the station is named, in the Los Angeles neighborhood of Koreatown. Unlike the other stations on Wilshire or Vermont which were built directly under the street, this station is offset on a diagonal between the two streets, allowing the lines to diverge without trains on one line having to slow for a tight turn. The station has a unique layout with two side platforms on two levels, necessitated by the flying junction between the lines just west of the station. It is the last station going from Union Station that serves both the B Line and D Line.

== Service ==
=== Station layout ===
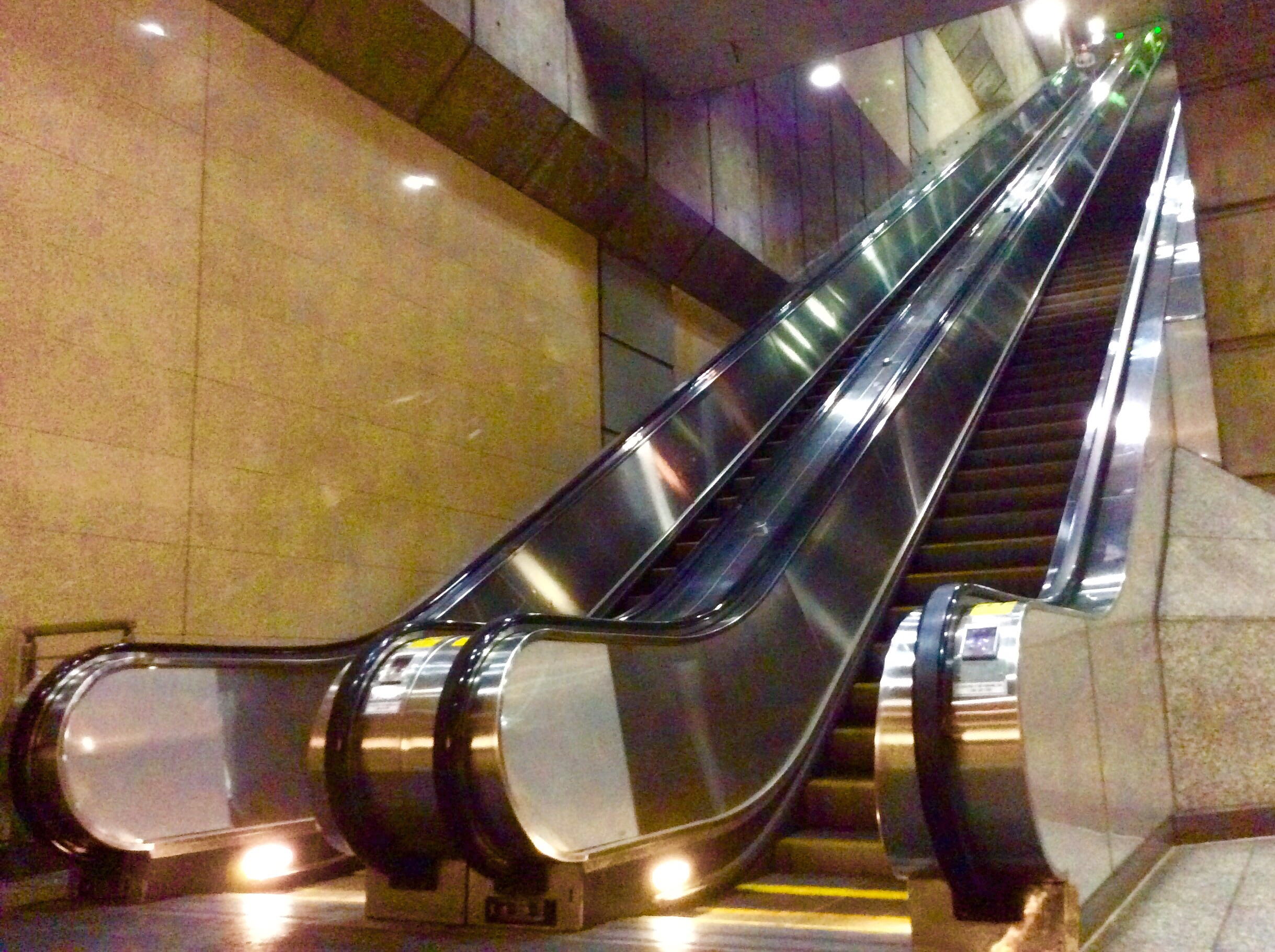
Wilshire/Vermont station escalator, one of the longest in the world

The station is located where the B Line and D Line converge on their way to Downtown Los Angeles. The station is designed with two platform levels: eastbound D and B Line trains (to Union Station) use the upper level, and westbound D (to Wilshire/La Cienega) and northbound B (to North Hollywood) trains use the lower level.

Wilshire/Vermont station has one of the longest escalators in the world at 152 feet (46 m) in length stretching from the ground level to the lower platform. At the time of its construction, it was the longest escalator in the United States west of the Mississippi River.

=== Hours and frequency ===
B Line trains run every day between approximately 4:30 a.m. and midnight. D Line trains run every day between approximately 5 a.m. and midnight. Towards North Hollywood or Wilshire/La Cienega, trains operate every 10 minutes throughout the day. Early morning and night service is approximately every 20 minutes. Towards Union Station, trains run every five minutes throughout the day. Early morning and night service is approximately every 10 minutes.

=== Connections ===
As of September 10, 2023, the following connections are available:

- LADOT DASH: Wilshire Center/Koreatown
- Los Angeles Metro Bus: 18, 20, 204, Rapid 720, Rapid 754

=== Future ===
A future station is planned for the Vermont Transit Corridor at Wilshire/Vermont station, connecting with the B and D lines.

== Station artwork ==
The artwork at the station depicts typographic letters and symbols designed by Bob Zoell. The letters on the pillars of the lower platform spell out "going by-by", what the B line and its patrons do when they zoom in and out of the station. Additional artwork at the station is the creation of Peter Shire.

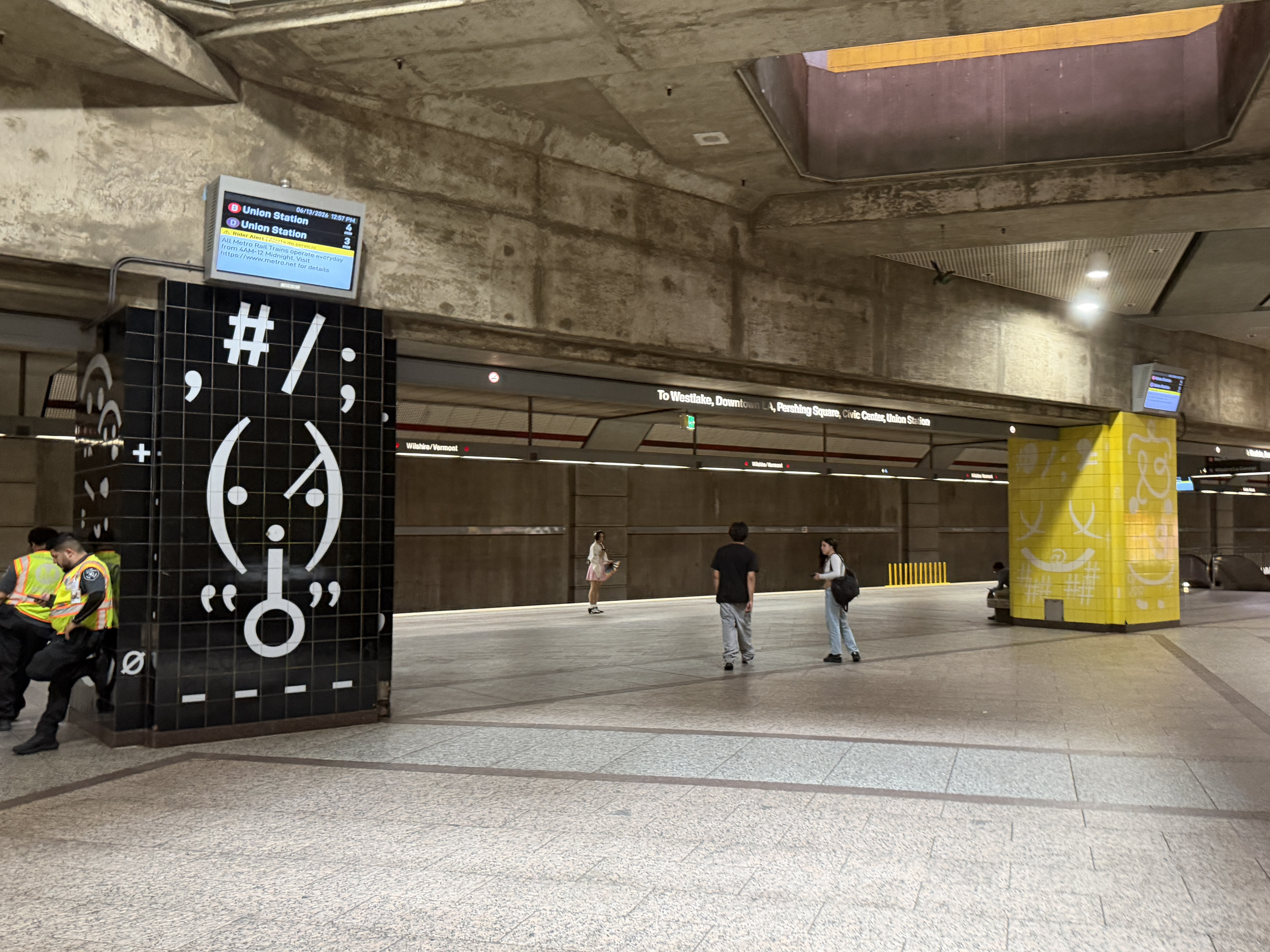
The upper platform's pillar art.

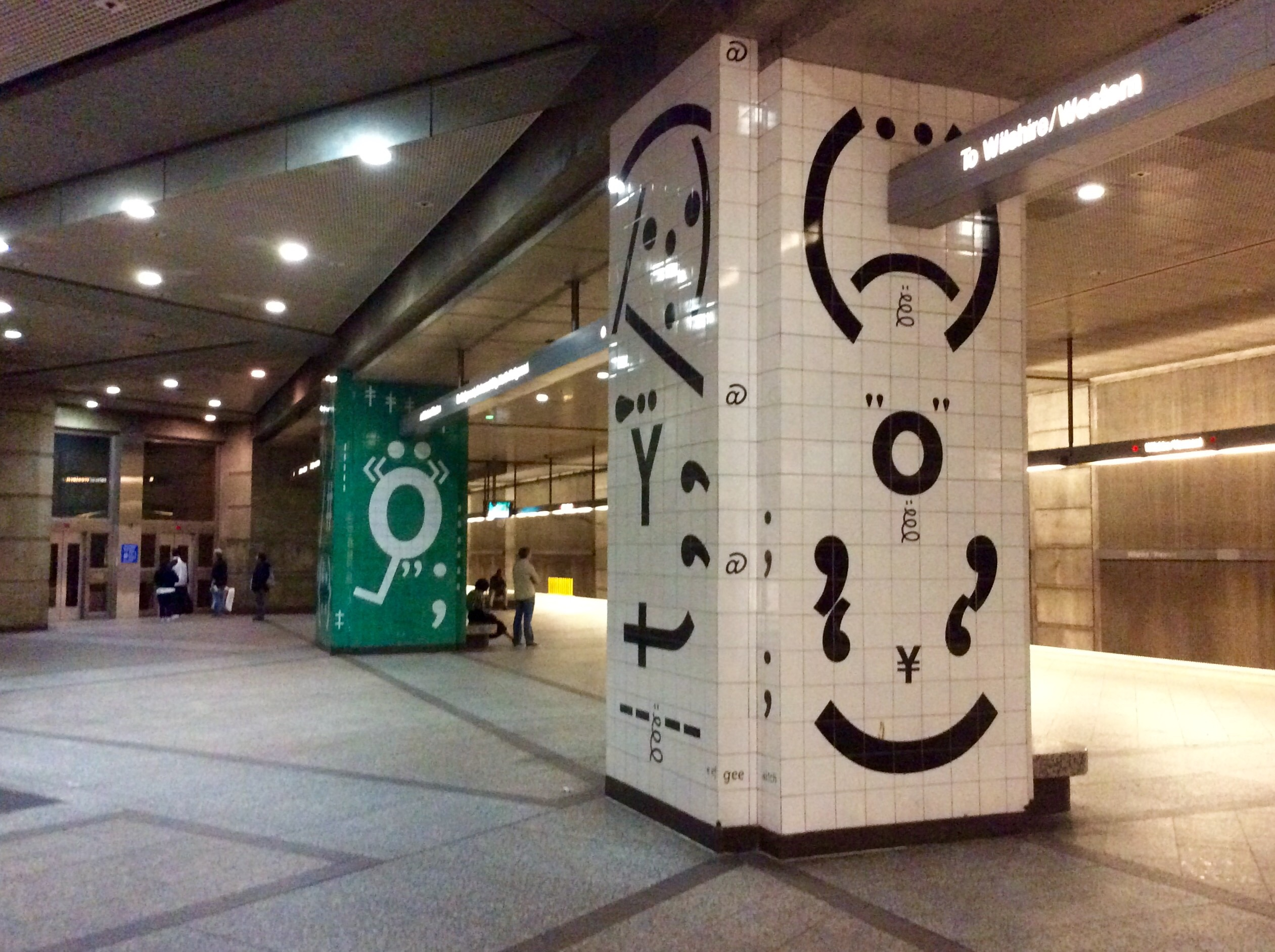
The lower platform's pillar art.

== Transit-oriented development ==
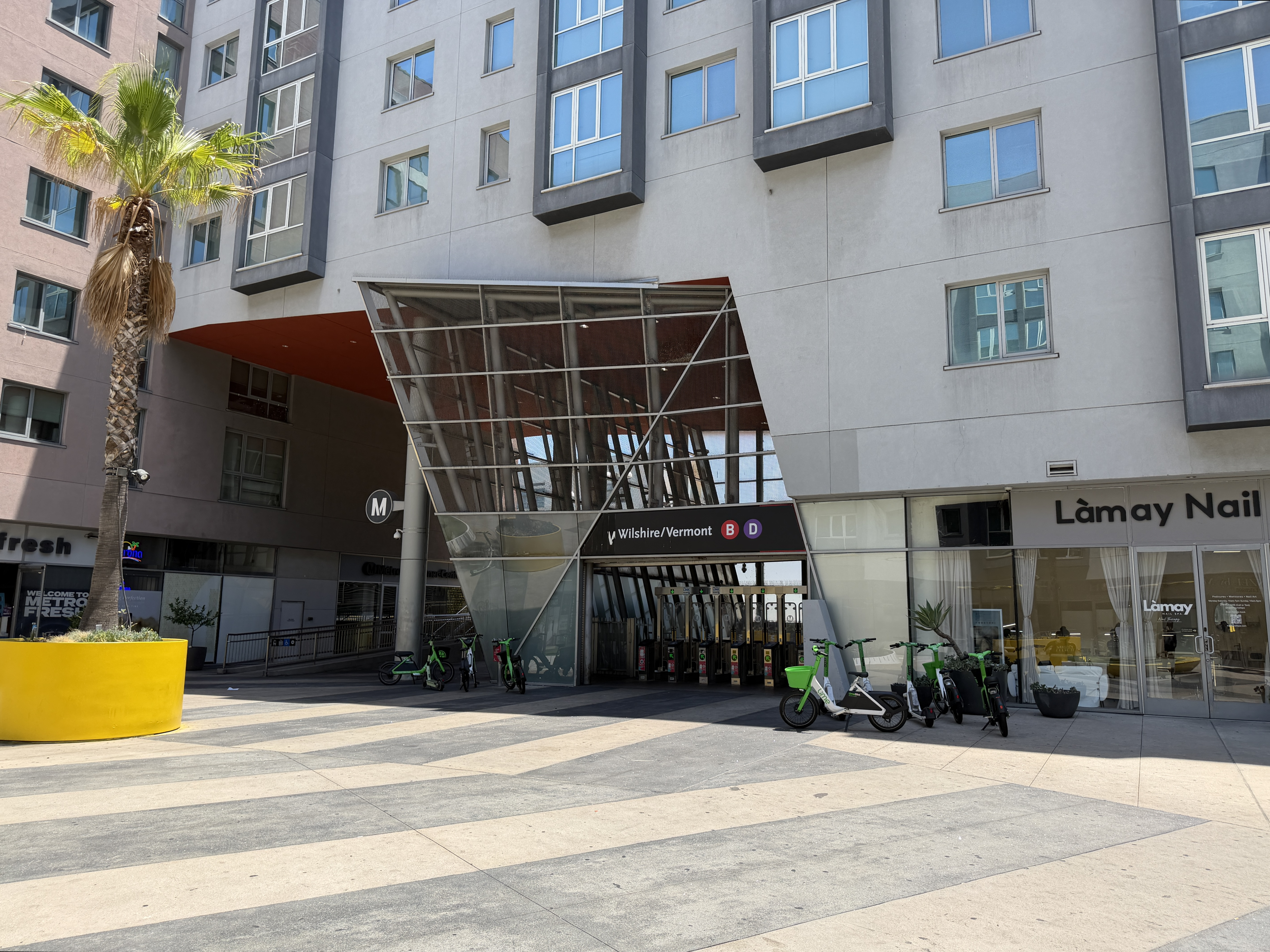
The main entrance to the station

Above the station is the Wilshire Vermont Station mixed-use transit village development, a $136-million apartment and retail complex designed by the architecture firm Arquitectonica and developed by Urban Partners and MacFarlane Partners on land owned by the Los Angeles County Metropolitan Transportation Authority. The development opened in 2007 and includes apartments, retail, and (as of 2009) an adjacent middle school. The property is managed by Greystar Real Estate Partners.

== Notable Places nearby ==
- Consulate General of Ethiopia, Sri Lanka, South Korea, El Salvador and China.
- Southwestern Law School, located in the historic Bullocks Wilshire building
- Lafayette Park
- Los Angeles County Superior Court
- Shatto Park
- First Congregational Church of Los Angeles
- Islamic Center of Southern California
