= V line =

V line may refer to:

- V/Line, a not for profit regional passenger train and coach operator in Victoria, Australia.
- V (New York City Subway service), a discontinued New York City subway service
- V (Los Angeles Railway), a former streetcar line in Los Angeles, California
