= Hollywood Sikh Temple =

Sikh temple in Los Angeles, California

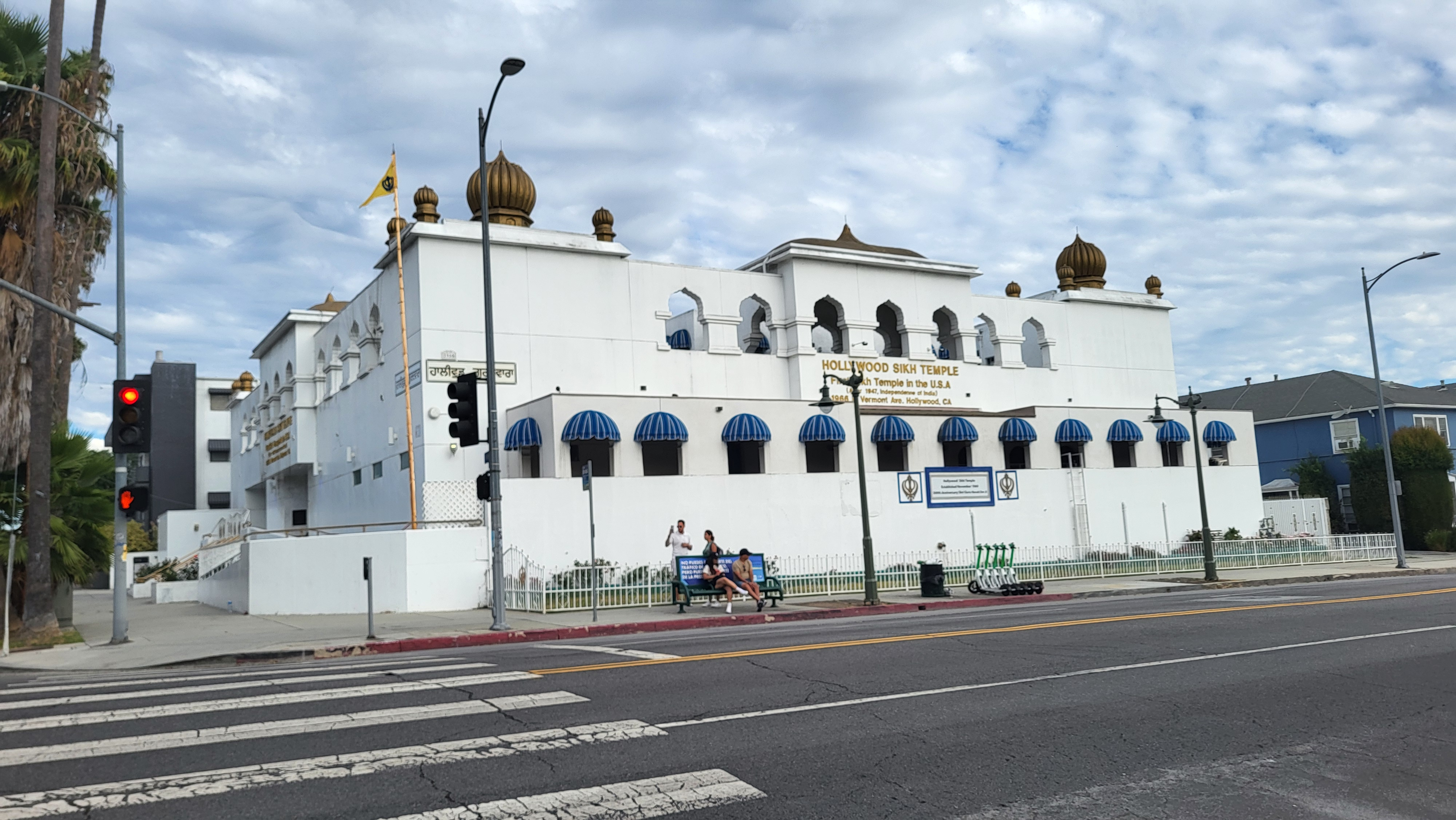
- The building's Vermont Avenue facade in 2025

- Location within the Los Angeles metropolitan area

General information
- Location: Los Angeles, California, 1966 N Vermont Avenue and 4624–4636 W. Finley Avenue, Los Angeles, CA 90027
- Coordinates: 34.108°N 118.292°W
- Groundbreaking: First in 1913, Second in 1994
- Opened: First in 1969, Second in 1996
- Renovated: 1938, 1969, 2016–2019
- Demolished: First in 1986
- Owner: Sikh Study Circle, Inc

Design and construction
- Architect: M. Sudhakar

Website
- hollywoodsikhtemple.org

Los Angeles Historic-Cultural Monument
- Designated: August 9, 2023
- Reference no.: 1292

Hollywood Sikh Temple, also known as Hollywood Sikh Gurdwara and Vermont Gurdwara, is a Sikh temple located at 1966 N Vermont Avenue and 4624–4636 W. Finley Avenue in the Los Feliz neighborhood of Los Angeles, California. Originally opened in an existing structure in 1969, the current temple was built in 1996 and declared a Los Angeles Historic-Cultural Monument in 2023.

== History ==
The first Hollywood Sikh Temple, founded by Dr. Amarjit Marwah, opened in 1969, making it the first Sikh temple to emerge in the United States following India's independence from British rule. Its dedication coincided with the 500th anniversary of Sikhism's founder, Guru Nanak. It was located in a 1913 single-family residence that was altered in 1938 to become a hotel and restaurant, on the corner of Vermont and Finley Avenue, an intersection that in 2019 was named Dr. Amarjit Marwah Square in honor of the temple founder.

By the mid-1980s, between 200–300 Sikhs attended Sunday services at the temple, and in 1986, the temple was demolished to make way for a larger one. The new, larger temple opened in 1996, its dedication ceremony presided over by "the supreme and highest spiritual and temporal authority of the Sikh religion visiting from India." This temple underwent an extensive remodel between 2016 and 2019, and was declared a Los Angeles Historic-Cultural Monument in 2023.

== Architecture and design ==
Hollywood Sikh Temple is square in plan and made of concrete with stucco cladding. Fenestration consists of rectangular and arched sash windows. The building faces Finley Avenue, with a recessed entrance that features wood-panel doors and marble-clad steps. The Vermont Avenue facade is equally ornate, with an arcade that features arches and awnings. Both facades feature second story bays with khandas and gold lettering that explain the history of the building. The final two facades face neighboring properties and are utilitarian in their design. The roof is flat and features 23 gold-painted, varying-sized onion domes, most of which are at the four corners of the building.

The first floor interior consists of an ornate entrance hall and main hall, as well as a shoe room, langar hall, kitchen, and various other rooms more functional in their design. The entrance hall is circular and features paintings, display cases, and a large chandelier, while the main hall features double-high ceilings, multiple chandeliers, circular platforms, an elevate throne, and a mural of Amritsar's Golden Temple. The second floor features a library, sleeping quarters, and a room for Guru Granth Sahib that features a chandelier, a throne with a canopy, and decorative wallpaper. Throughout the building, the ceiling is made of plaster and the floors are either tile, marble, or carpet. Integrity of the building, both interior and exterior, is high.
