= Vermont/Santa Monica station =

Rapid transit station in Los Angeles, California

Vermont/Santa Monica
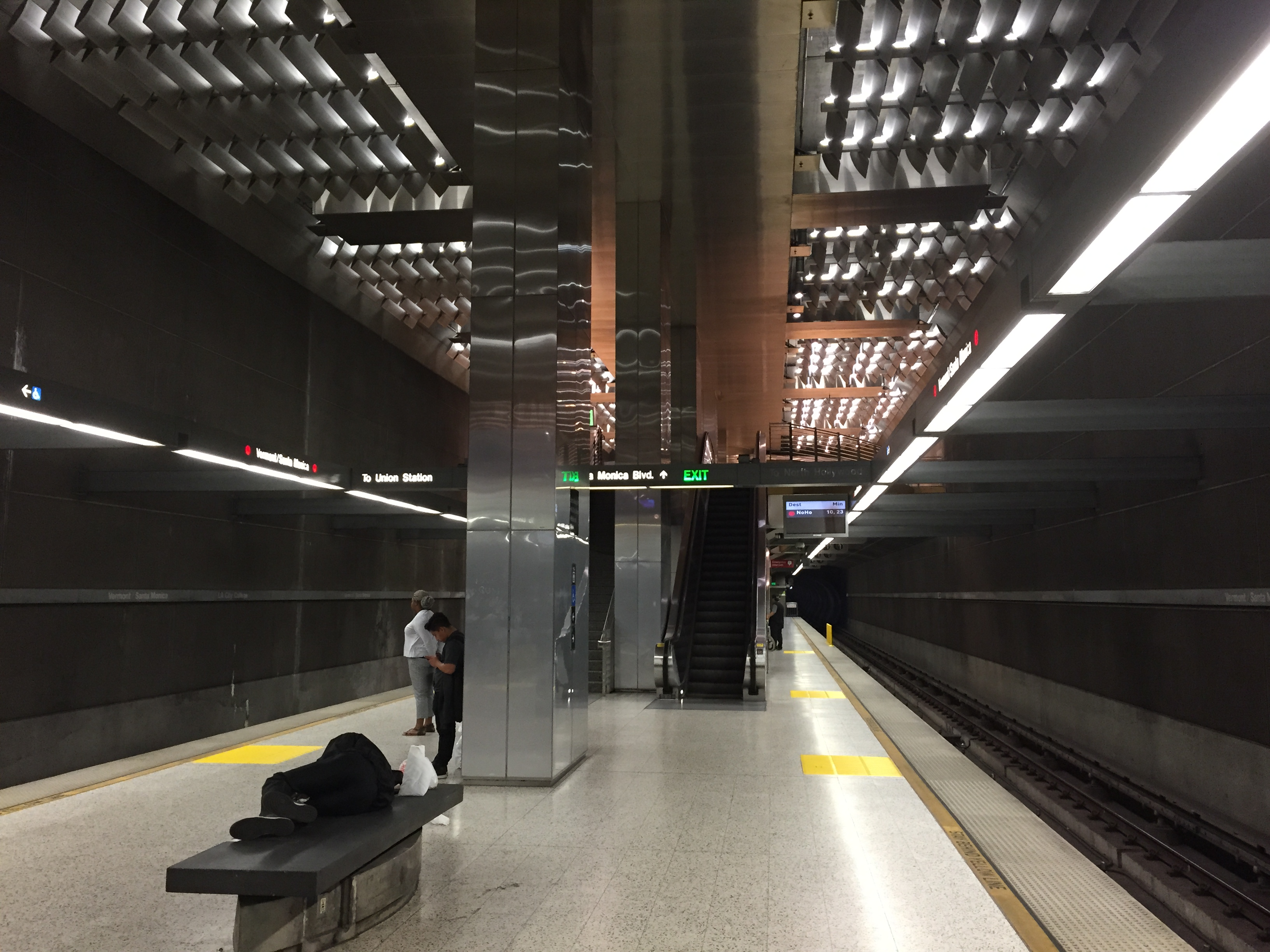
- Vermont/Santa Monica station platform

General information
- Other names: Vermont/Santa Monica/L.A. City College
- Location: 1015 North Vermont Avenue; Los Angeles, California
- Coordinates: 34.0903°N 118.2919°W
- Owner: Los Angeles Metro
- Platforms: 1 island platform
- Tracks: 2
- Connections: Los Angeles Metro Bus; LADOT DASH

Construction
- Structure type: Underground
- Cycle facilities: Metro Bike Share station and racks
- Architect: Ellerbe Becket & Robert Millar

History
- Opened: June 12, 1999

Passengers
- FY 2026: 2,373 (avg. wkdy boardings)

Services
Preceding station	Metro Rail	Following station
Vermont/Sunset toward North Hollywood	B Line	Vermont/Beverly toward Union Station
Future services
Preceding station	Metro Busway	Following station
Sunset Terminus	Vermont Transit Corridor	3rd Street toward Athens
Location

Vermont/Santa Monica station (also known as Vermont/Santa Monica/L.A. City College station) is an underground rapid transit station on the B Line of the Los Angeles Metro Rail system. It is located under Vermont Avenue at its intersection with Santa Monica Boulevard, after which the station is named, in the East Hollywood neighborhood of Los Angeles.

Vermont/Santa Monica has two entrances on Vermont Avenue, a north entrance and a south entrance. The north entrance faces Santa Monica Boulevard. The south entrance, near Lockwood Avenue, is adjacent to Los Angeles City College and three blocks from the Braille Institute.

== Service ==
=== Station layout ===
Vermont/Santa Monica is a two-story station; the top level is a mezzanine with ticket machines while the bottom is the platform level. The station uses a simple island platform with two tracks.

=== Hours and frequency ===
B Line trains run every day between approximately 4:30 a.m. and midnight. Trains operate every 10 minutes during peak hours. Early morning and night service is approximately every 20 minutes.

=== Connections ===
As of September 10, 2023, the following connections are available:

- LADOT DASH: Hollywood
- Los Angeles Metro Bus: 4, 204, 217 (late night only), Rapid 754

=== Future ===
A future station is planned for the Vermont Transit Corridor at Vermont/Santa Monica station, connecting with the B Line.

== Station design ==
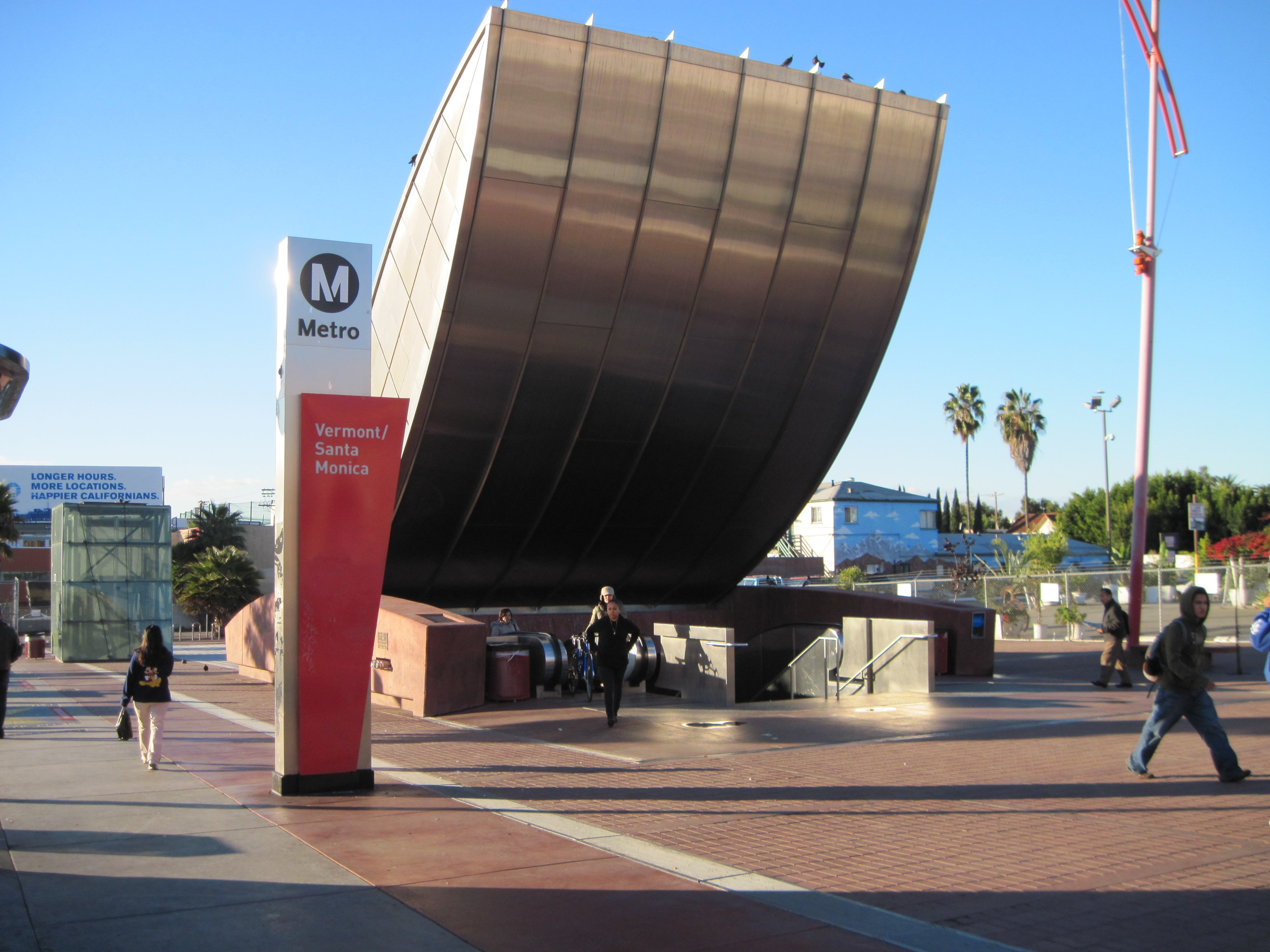
The entrance of the station with the sign pillar design of 2003–2014

Vermont/Santa Monica, like many of the B Line stations, was designed by an artist/architect team. For this station, artist Robert Millar collaborated with the architectural firm Ellerbe Becket with Mehrdad Yazdani as lead designer. The centerpiece of their design is the large stainless steel “wing” canopy over the entrance at the corner of Vermont & Santa Monica, along with skylights that flood the 42-foot high space with light during the day, and become a brightly lit “stage” at night.

The team also worked with the nearby Braille Institute and LA City College to incorporate a variety of interesting textures into the design and Robert Millar layered thousands of subtly painted questions onto the concrete surfaces of the station.

The station team received a Progressive Architecture Award for the design.
