= Little Armenia, Los Angeles =

Little Armenia
- Neighborhood of Los Angeles
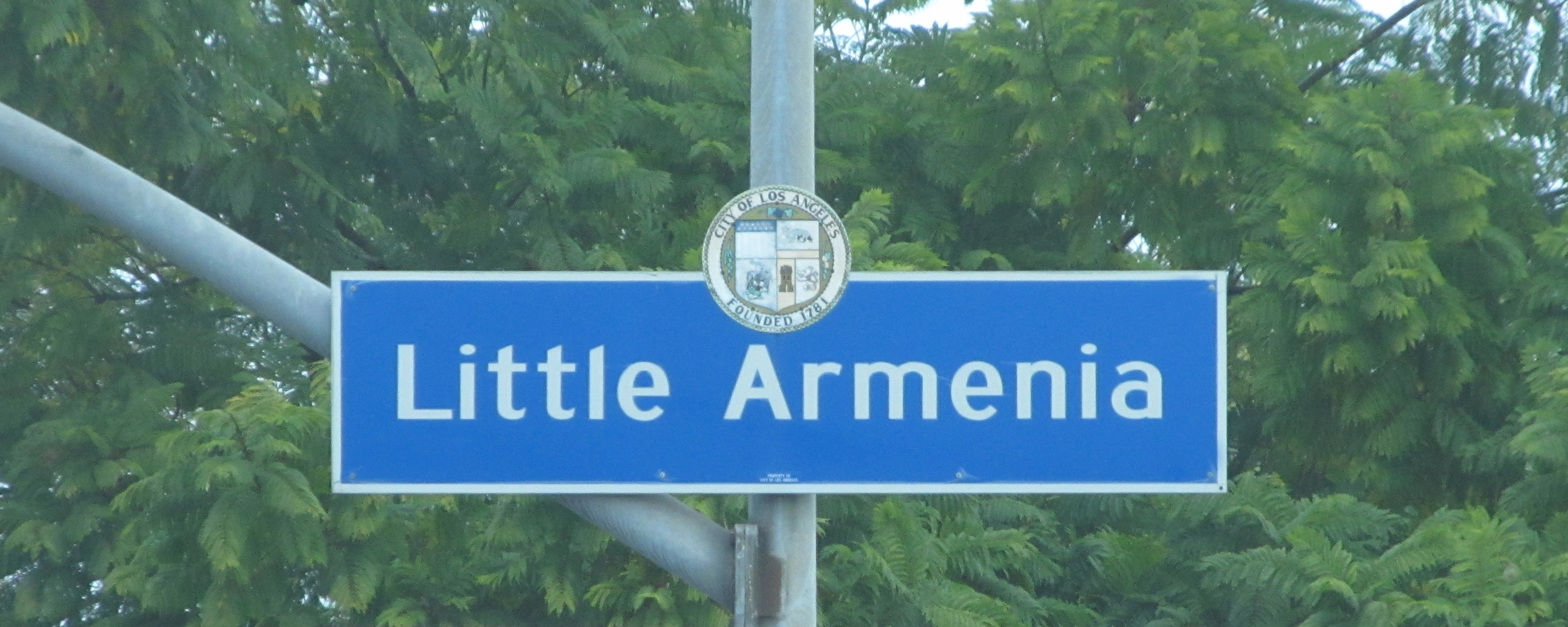
- Little Armenia neighborhood sign located at the intersection of Normandie Avenue and Santa Monica Boulevard

- Location within Central Los Angeles
- Coordinates: 34.098114°N 118.300497°W
- Country: United States
- State: California
- County: Los Angeles
- City: Los Angeles
- Time zone: UTC-8 (PST)
  - Summer (DST): UTC-7 (PDT)

Little Armenia (Armenian: Փոքր Հայաստան, romanized: P’ok’r Hayastan) is a neighborhood in Central Los Angeles, California. It is named after the Armenians who escaped genocide and made their way to Los Angeles during the early part of the 20th century.

The area is served by the Metro B Line at the Hollywood/Western, Vermont/Sunset and Vermont/Santa Monica stations.

== History ==
On October 6, 2000, the Los Angeles City Council designated a portion of East Hollywood as “Little Armenia” in an effort to recognize the community’s vast “presence and voice in Los Angeles".

On April 24, 2015, the intersection of Hollywood Boulevard and Western Avenue was designated as Armenian Genocide Memorial Square to commemorate the 100th anniversary of the Armenian genocide. It was proposed by Los Angeles City Council members Mitch O'Farrell and Paul Krekorian and approved by the Los Angeles City Council on March 18, 2015.

== Geography ==
As defined by the City Council, Little Armenia is "the area bounded on the north by Hollywood Boulevard between the 101 Freeway and Vermont Avenue, on the east by Vermont Avenue from Hollywood Boulevard to Santa Monica Boulevard, on the south by Santa Monica Boulevard between Vermont Avenue and U.S. Route 101 and on the west by Route 101 from Santa Monica Boulevard to Hollywood Boulevard".

Thai Town is located to the north of Little Armenia.

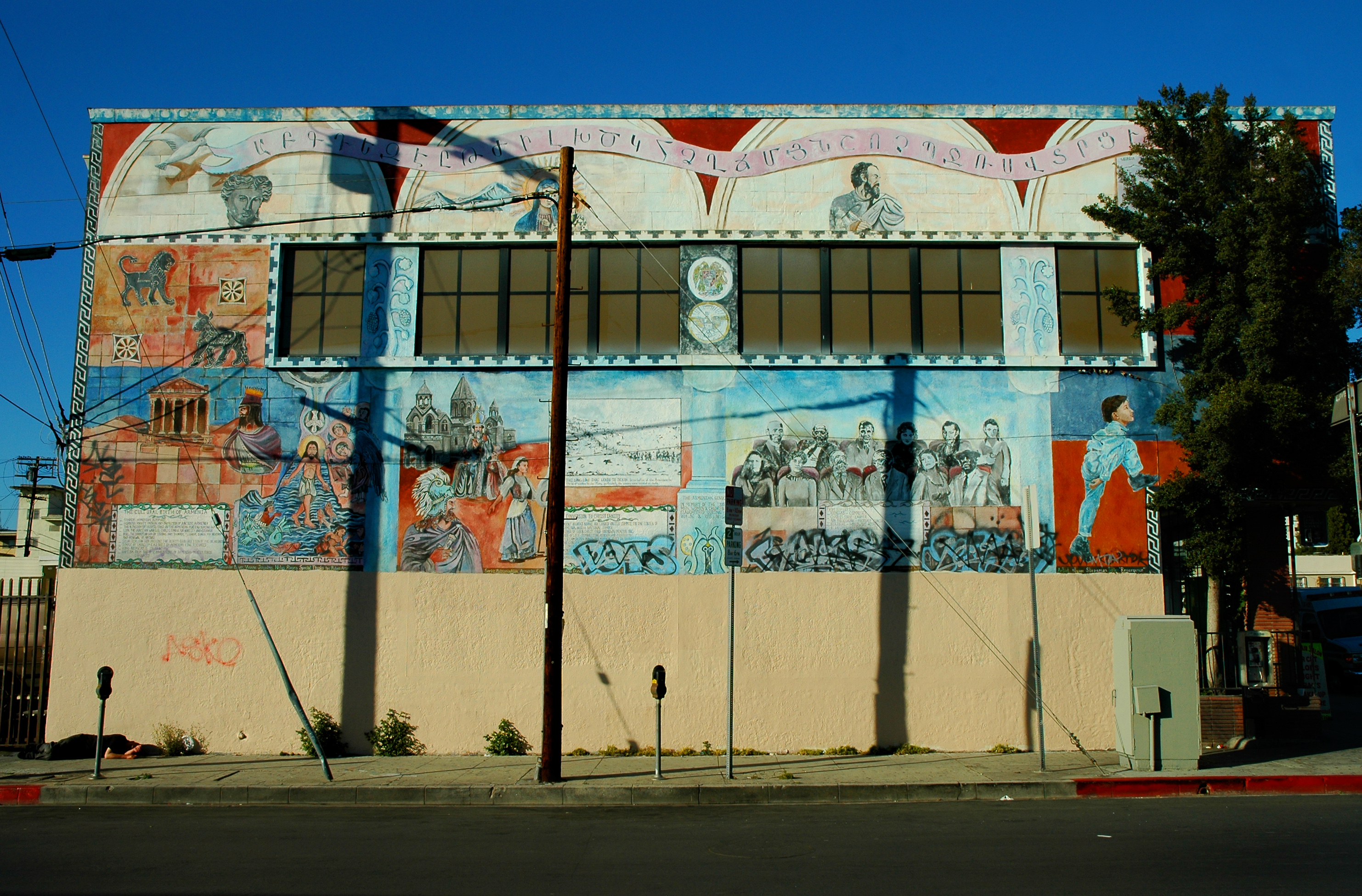
Mural of The History of Armenia

== Events ==
On April 24 each year, Armenians gather in the neighborhood to observe Armenian Genocide Remembrance Day (Solidarity events also take place in Montebello, Glendale and Beverly Hills).

== Transportation ==
Little Armenia is served by the Metro B Line subway, which runs north-south along Vermont Avenue and east-west along Hollywood Boulevard.

Metro subway stations include:

- Vermont/Santa Monica
- Vermont/Sunset
- Hollywood/Western

Los Angeles Department of Transportation provides bus service through the neighborhood.

== Parks and recreation ==
Parks within Little Armenia's official borders are the following:

- Barnsdall Art Park - 4800 Hollywood Boulevard. The park includes the Frank Lloyd Wright designed Hollyhock House and a city-run arts center built in 1919-1921.

== Education ==
Public schools within Little Armenia's official borders are operated by LAUSD.

=== Public ===
- Kingsley Elementary School,
  5200 West Virginia Avenue
- Ramona Elementary School,
  1133 North Mariposa Avenue

=== Private ===
- Alex Pilibos Armenian School,
  1625 North Alexandria Avenue

== Notable places ==
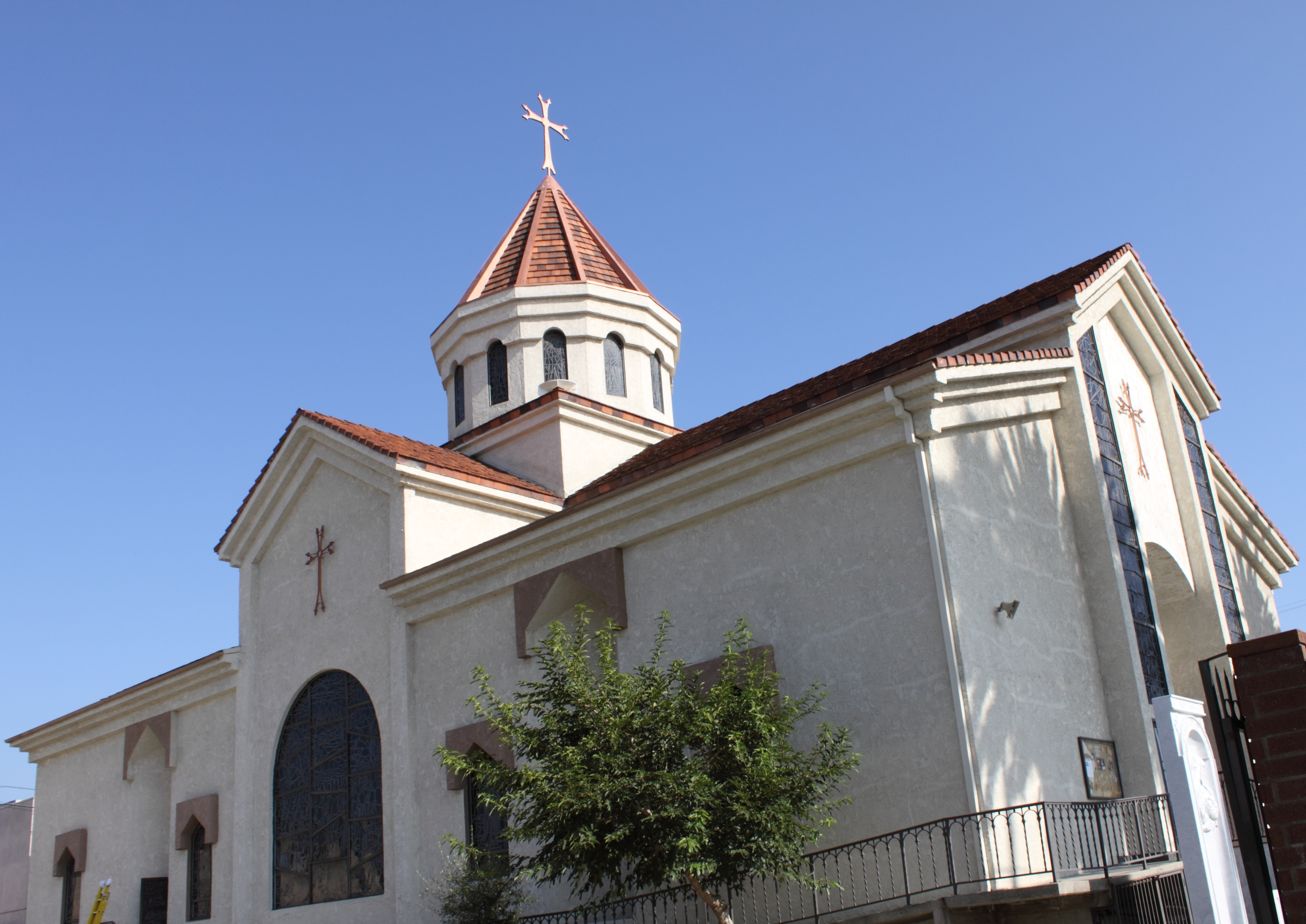
St. Garabed Church on Alexandria Avenue

Places of interest within Little Armenia's official borders include the following:

- Armenian Genocide Memorial Square. Located at the intersection of Hollywood Boulevard and Western Avenue.
- The Church of Scientology Los Angeles headquarters. Located on Sunset Bl. between N. Catalina St. and L. Ron Hubbard Way.
- Hollyhock House
- Hollywood & Western Building
- Zankou Chicken's first restaurant in U.S.A.

== See also ==
- Armenian Americans
- History of Armenian Americans in Los Angeles
- List of Armenian-Americans
- Armenian Diaspora
- Armenian Assembly of America
- Armenian American Political Action Committee
- Armenian National Committee of America
- Armenian Youth Federation
- Little Armenia, New York
