= TAP card =

Public transit smart card used in Los Angeles, California

TAP
- Location: Los Angeles County, California
- Launched: 2007 (soft launch); 2008 (monthly passes); 2009 (day passes); 2011 (cash purse)
- Technology: Contactless smart card
- Operator: Cubic Transportation Systems (system maintenance); Los Angeles Metro (operations and customer support)
- Manager: Los Angeles Metro
- Currency: US$
- Validity: Most public transport in Los Angeles County (See Agencies using TAP section for list)
- Website: www.taptogo.net

The TAP card (standing for Transit Access Pass) is a contactless smart card used for automated fare collection on most public transport agencies within Los Angeles County, California. The card is also available in electronic form, free of charge, in Apple Wallet and a standalone app on Apple and Android devices, thereby bypassing the need to purchase the plastic USD $2 card. It is administered by Los Angeles Metro, and the card and fare collection systems are manufactured by Cubic Transportation Systems.

== Description ==
The physical TAP card is a blue, or orange for reduced fare, credit-card-sized contactless stored value smart card which can hold a transit Pass or cash balance. The electronic card can be acquired either through the TAP mobile app or through Apple Wallet. The TAP card must be tapped on electronic readers to validate it when entering and transferring within the system. TAP readers are integrated in bus fare boxes, bus validators and standalone readers are located just outside the paid area of Metro Rail stations. Because Metro Rail has a mix of barrier free and faregated areas, it operates on a proof-of-payment system: as such, Metro's fare inspectors randomly check using a wireless handheld unit to make sure TAP users have validated their card. The cards may be "recharged" in person from ticket vending machines in Metro Rail stations, TAP Vendors, at Metro Customer Service Centers or online. The card is designed to reduce the number of transactions at Customer Service Centers. The physical card costs $2 and is only available with a fare media product (such as a day pass or stored value). The electronic version is free to use but requires purchasing stored value when adding it to a user's mobile wallet, after which, it can be enrolled in any applicable discount programs through the online TAP website. Cards can also be purchased on Metro buses (since 15 September 2014) for $2 plus stored value (which works like a debit card). TAP cards expire approximately 3–10 years from purchase.

Currently most operators sell passes on the TAP web site, with Metro replacing their own monthly, weekly, and day passes with a fare capping system. Stored value (cash purse) can be added onto the TAP card at rail ticket vending machines, retail locations, and online. Non-Metro agencies may sell transfers on TAP cards, which can be read by Metro TAP readers. For non-Metro operators, TAP cards are sold at their administrative offices, TAP website, or customer service centers.

There are some agencies in Southern California which do not (yet) accept the TAP card. Transit agencies have been allowed to transition onto TAP at their own pace, and it is not a requirement for receiving Metro funding or participation in interagency transfer agreements.

== History ==
Prior to introduction of the TAP card, a magnetic stripe card called the Metrocard (not to be confused with the New York Metropolitan Transportation Authority's card) was introduced in 1993 on Culver CityBus, with later expansion to Foothill Transit, Montebello Bus Lines, Norwalk Transit, and Santa Monica Big Blue Bus. The fare card only offered stored value, and was compatible with GFI Genfare fareboxes used by these systems. The program was dubbed the Universal Fare System, or UFS, for future implementation throughout Los Angeles County. Later innovations expanded the magnetic stripe technology for monthly and day passes.

TAP was initially tested by UCLA students, select businesses (A-TAP and B-TAP program) and Metro staff. In October 2007, TAP had a two-month test program limited to the first 2,000 customers. TAP was rolled out to the general public in February 2008 as a free upgrade for monthly pass customers, and on February 11, 2008, to replace the stored value Metrocards for Culver CityBus riders. Santa Monica Big Blue Bus opted out of the Universal Fare System program entirely and in 2006 converted their existing regional Metrocards to operate only within their system. Other agencies, such as Foothill Transit and Norwalk Transit, transitioned from Metrocard to TAP in 2009.

On March 15, 2009, TAP's scope was expanded to Metro 24-hour passes, which are now no longer sold and have been replaced with fare capping (although paper 24-hour passes were still able to be purchased at ticket vending machines until 2012). TAP cards were issued for seniors and the disabled beginning January 2009, and all senior and disabled riders were required to obtain TAP cards by December 2010.

In August 2011, all Metro multi-day passes were converted to TAP cards. The existing monthly and weekly passes were converted into 30 and 7 day passes, respectively, with the period beginning on the first tap after the pass is purchased.

Effective September 2012, all Metro Rail fares are sold on TAP, and paper tickets are no longer sold, with the exception of municipal transfers, which have since also been moved to TAP. All EZ transit passes have been converted to TAP. The fee for obtaining a TAP card is $2.

Between June 19, 2013 and June 18, 2014 the fare gates at 40 Metro stations were "latched" so they open only with a valid TAP card. To make the fare gate system possible, other agencies use TAP-compatible fare media in 2018.

Effective July 15, 2018, paper-issued interagency transfers as well as temporary TAP cards used to transfer to Metro Rail have been discontinued. Passengers must use a TAP card with Stored Value to board the first bus or the Metro Rail/Orange/Silver Line, then use the TAP card to transfer to another bus or Metro Rail/Orange/Silver Line to complete the trip. On Metro buses and rail lines, transfers are free for up to two hours.

Effective July 1, 2023, Metro introduced Fare Capping, eliminating their monthly, weekly, and day passes. The regular fare cap is currently set at a maximum of $5 a day, or $18 a week, with lower caps for riders with discounted fares. After reaching these caps, riders are not charged for travel for the remainder of the time period.

== Design ==
The default, standard fare TAP card design features a dark blue background with red and yellow circles and the TAP logo, introduced in 2015. The reduced fare design features an orange background and shaded palm tree. Prior to this, the designs featured simple light blue and orange backgrounds with the words "Smart. Simple. Secure" printed at the top.

Since 2012, Metro, LADOT, and other agencies have also released various limited-edition TAP card designs. Past designs have featured CicLAvia, Metro Bike Share, Union Station's 75th anniversary, the Los Angeles Marathon, and the naming of Obama Boulevard. Other designs feature partnerships with schools such as UCLA and USC, sports teams including the Los Angeles Kings and Los Angeles Lakers, along with yearly, commemorative cards for Valentine's Day, LGBT Pride Month, Latino Heritage Month, Memorial Day, and Veterans Day.

== Features ==
Useable on Metro Bus, Metro Rail, Metro Bike Share and Micro. Digital version is available on Apple Wallet and Android devices. In 2024 TAP started all-door boarding on buses to enable faster and more convenient trips.

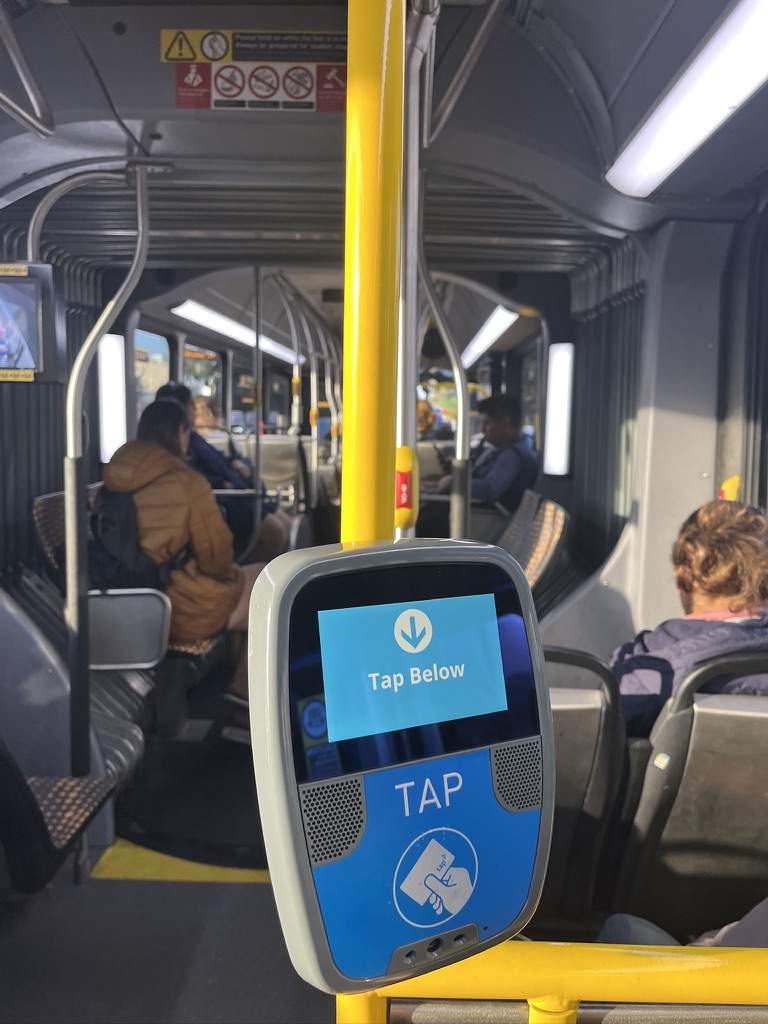
A new tap card reader enabling all-door boarding on buses

== Agencies using TAP ==
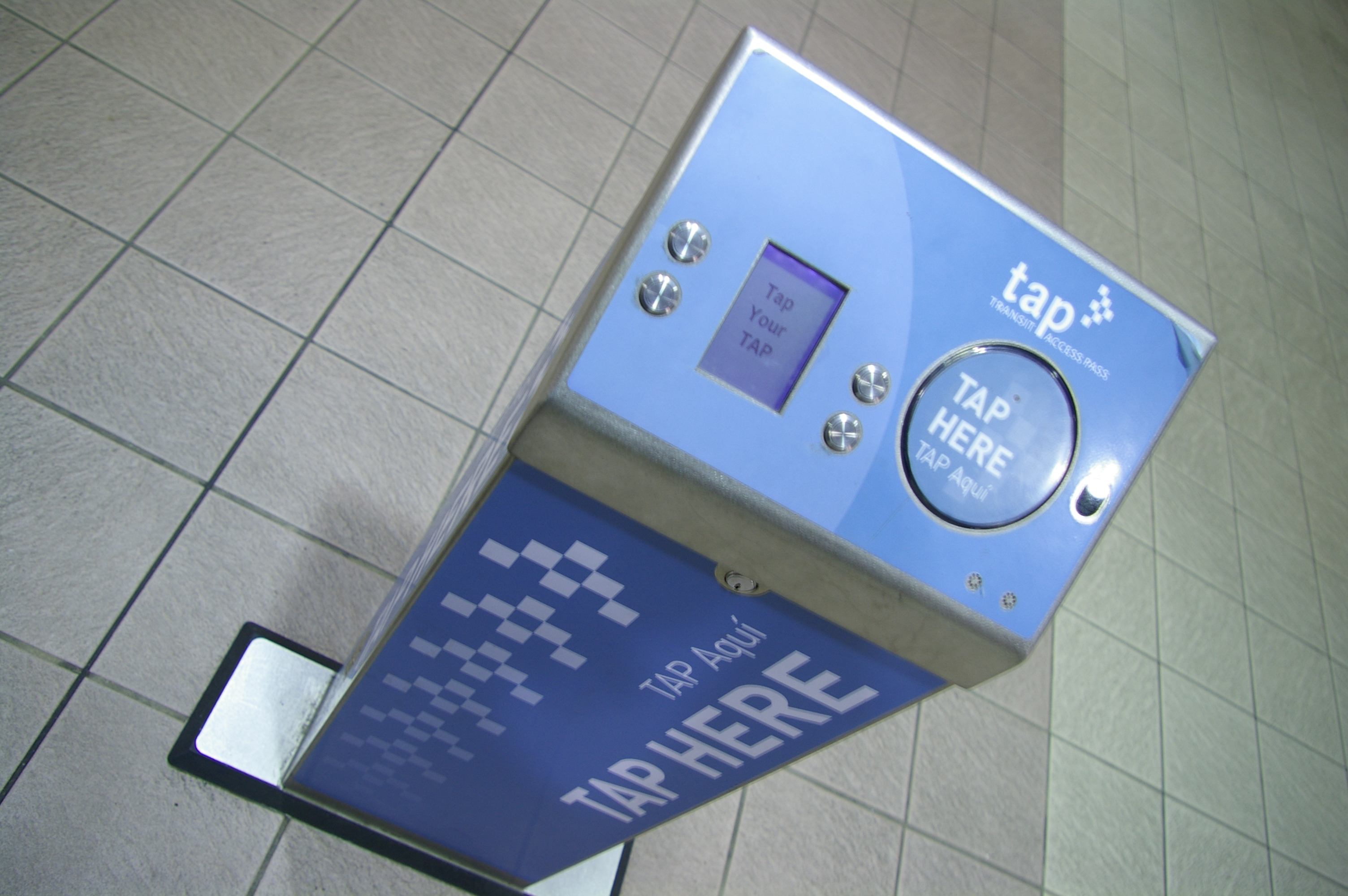
A TAP validator at a Metro station

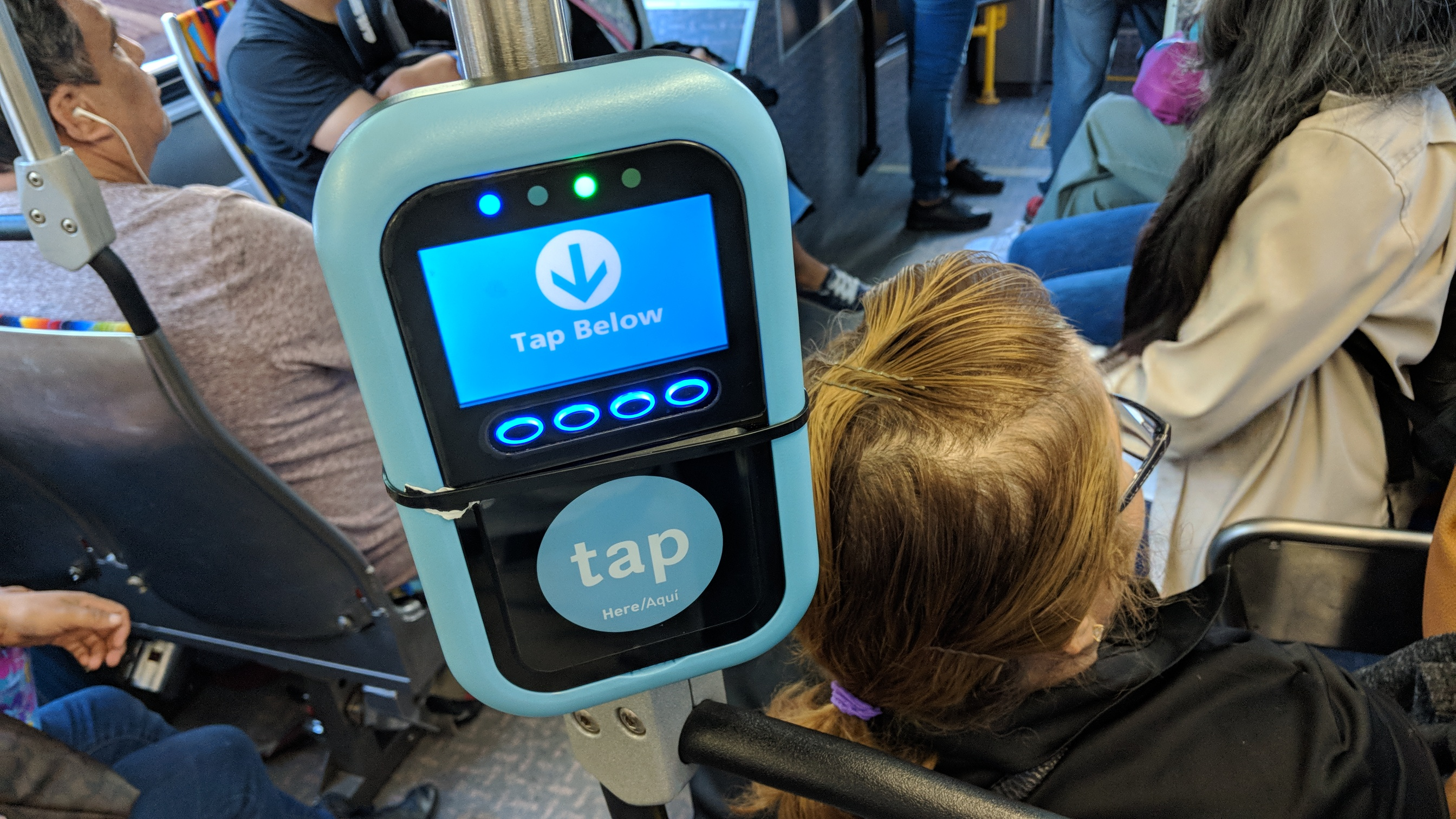
A TAP reader on a Metro bus

=== Current ===
TAP is accepted by 28 transit agencies based in Los Angeles County only, as of December 2023:

- Angels Flight
- Antelope Valley Transit Authority
- Baldwin Park Transit
- Beach Cities Transit
- Big Blue Bus (Santa Monica)
- Burbank Bus
- Carson Circuit Transit System
- City of Santa Clarita Transit
- Compton Renaissance Transit
- Culver CityBus
- FlyAway (LAX)
- Foothill Transit
- Gardena GTrans
- Glendale Beeline
- Glendora Transportation Division
- Huntington Park Express
- Lawndale Beat
- Los Angeles County Department of Public Works
- Los Angeles Metro
  - Los Angeles Metro Bike Share
  - Los Angeles Metro Bus
  - Los Angeles Metro Busway
  - Los Angeles Metro Rail
- Los Angeles Department of Transportation
  - Commuter Express
  - DASH
- Long Beach Transit
- Montebello Bus Lines
- Monterey Park Spirit Bus
- Norwalk Transit
- Palos Verdes Peninsula Transit Authority
- Pasadena Transit
- Santa Clarita Transit
- Torrance Transit

=== Partial ===
==== Metrolink ====
Metrolink does not use TAP for fare collection and has no plans to do so. Instead, tickets include an EZ Transit Pass QR code and are only enabled on a one-way, round trip, 7 day, weekend and monthly passes issued for trips to or from a Los Angeles County destination, allowing passengers to transfer to connecting services. Passengers boarding buses show their ticket to the driver, passengers entering a rail station with gates scan a QR code on the ticket or mobile app to unlatch the turnstile.

==== Orange County Transportation Authority ====
While the Orange County Transportation Authority does not use TAP, the agency will honor TAP cards when passengers board lines that directly serve Metrolink Stations (routes 1, 21, 24, 26, 29, 38, 43, 47/A, 50, 53, 54, 56, 57, 59, 70, 71, 83, 85, 86, 90, 91, 143, 123, 453, 472, 473, 480, 543, 553, 560, 862) and at bus stops where OCTA buses directly connect with.

== TAP Plus ==
TAP Plus is an upgraded version of the Transit Access Pass (TAP) system, offering enhanced features and integration capabilities. It supports open payments and account-based transactions, allowing users to manage various fare products such as GoPass, LIFE, and others. The system is designed to work seamlessly across multiple transit agencies and includes updated equipment like new validators for rail gates and buses.

A timeline graphically showing how TAP Plus will be implemented.

The TAP Plus system aims to improve user experience by simplifying access to transit services and offering flexible payment options. It includes a robust customer feedback mechanism, with user experience testing set to begin in the Summer of 2024. The implementation of open payment options and account-based systems is scheduled to be completed by 2026, aligning with the readiness timeline for the 2028 Olympics.

Key Features:

Interoperability with multiple transit operators and fare products

Support for open payment systems

Enhanced equipment and infrastructure

Focus on user experience and feedback-driven improvements
