= Vermont Avenue =

Street in Los Angeles, California

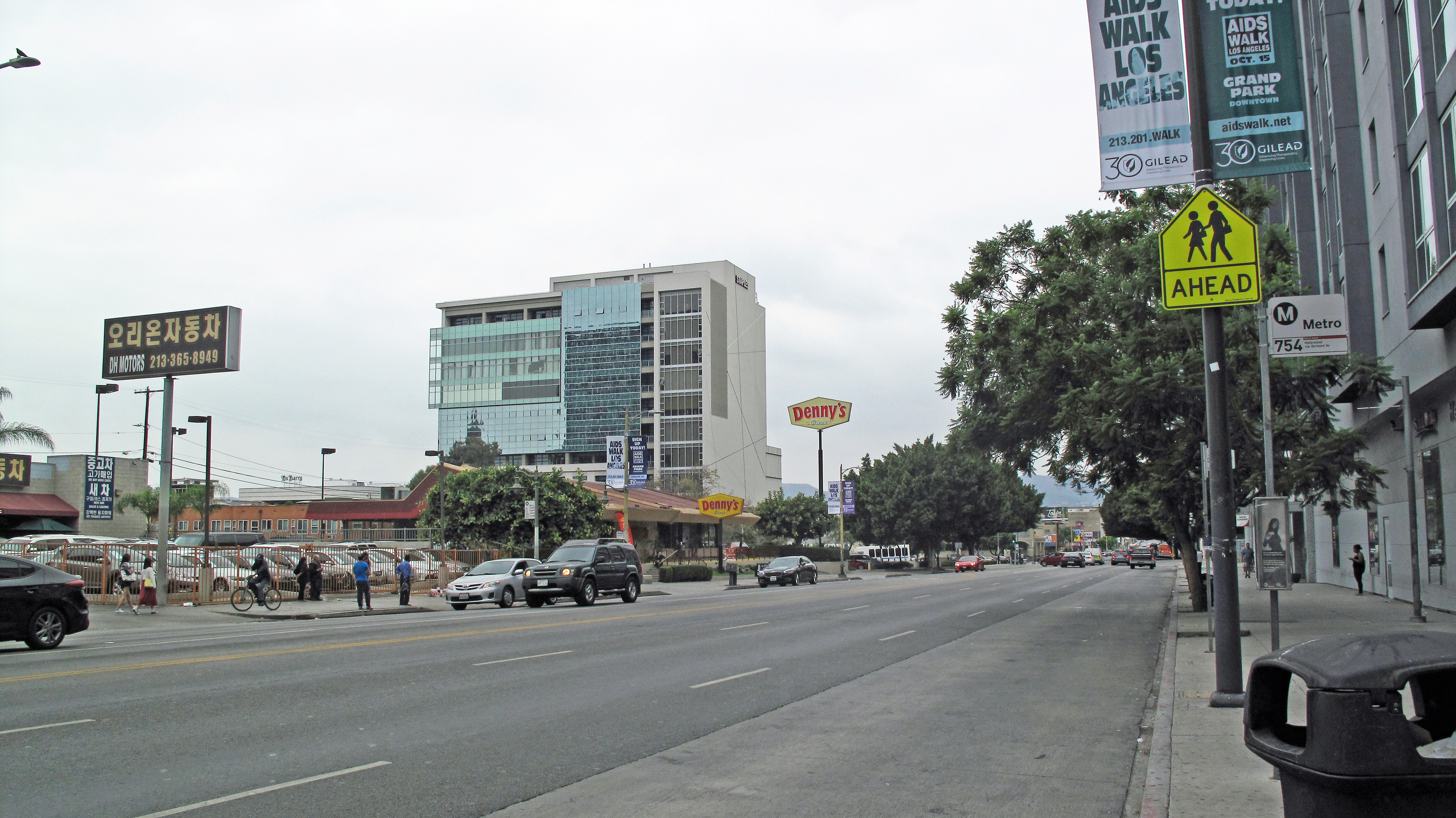
- Interactive map of Vermont Avenue
- Maintained by: Local jurisdictions
- Length: 23 miles (37 km)
- Nearest metro station: : Vermont/Athens; Expo/Vermont; Wilshire/Vermont; Vermont/Beverly; Vermont/Santa Monica; Vermont/Sunset
- South end: Palos Verdes Drive North, Anaheim and Gaffey Streets near San Pedro
- Major junctions: SR 1 in Harbor City; I-405 in Harbor Gateway; SR 91 in Gardena; I-105 in Vermont Vista; I-10 in Pico-Union; US 101 / SR 2 in East Hollywood
- North end: Griffith Park

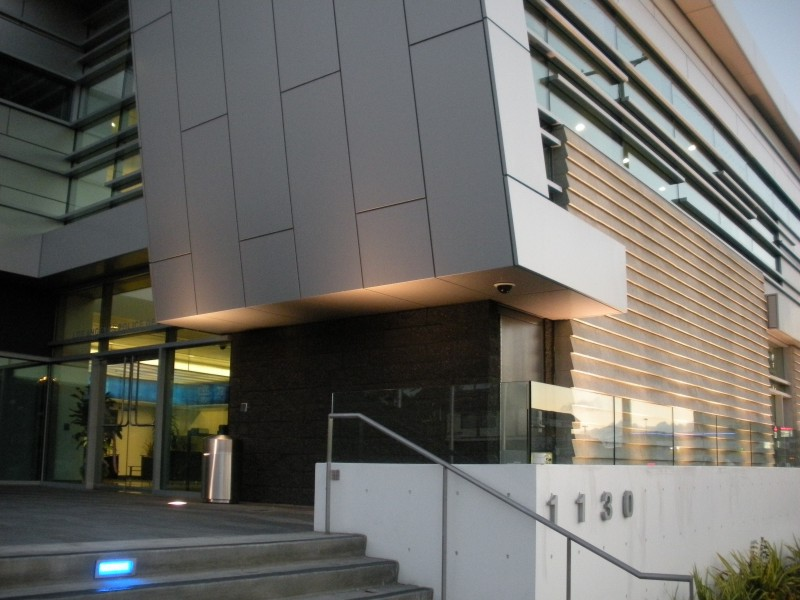
Los Angeles Police Station at 11th Street and Vermont Avenue

Vermont Avenue is one of the longest running north–south streets in City of Los Angeles and Los Angeles County, California. With a length of 23.3 miles (37.5 km), is the third longest of the north–south thoroughfares in the region. For most of its length between its southern end in San Pedro and south of Downtown Los Angeles, it runs parallel to the west of the Harbor Freeway (I-110). Vermont is a state in the northeastern US.

== Route description ==
Vermont Avenue's southern point is just north of San Pedro at a five-point intersection with Anaheim Street, Gaffey Street and Palos Verdes Drive. After a short distance, Normandie Avenue branches off due north while Vermont turns northeast towards its intersection with Pacific Coast Highway (PCH). Afterwards, it travels roughly in a straight line north for 22 miles (35 km), parallel to the Harbor Freeway (I-110) to the east. North of PCH, it passes through the unincorporated area of West Carson before crossing the San Diego Freeway (I-405).

Between a point south of the intersection with Artesia Boulevard/western end of the Gardena Freeway (SR 91), and El Segundo Boulevard, Vermont marks the eastern boundary of the City of Gardena. At 164th Street in Gardena, Vermont widens from a four-lane thoroughfare to a six-lane road with a wide median. From 164th Street, an abandoned railway runs through the median to a point just north of Redondo Beach Boulevard, afterwards the median becomes tree-lined. From 88th Street to Gage Avenue, Vermont Avenue includes adjacent frontage roads. North of Gage, Vermont thins down to 4 lanes.

Vermont Avenue then passes at the western end of the University of Southern California and Exposition Park in South Los Angeles. In August 2012, the City of Los Angeles designated a portion of Vermont Avenue in Pico-Union as the "El Salvador Community Corridor."

Between the Santa Monica Freeway (I-10) and the Hollywood Freeway (US 101), Vermont Avenue crosses Wilshire Boulevard and passes through Koreatown. It then forms the eastern boundary of the East Hollywood district of Hollywood as it passes through Little Armenia. It intersects Sunset Boulevard, next to the Children's Hospital Los Angeles, and Hollywood Boulevard, to the east of the Barnsdall Art Park. At the intersection with Los Feliz Boulevard, it becomes a divided road with one lane in each direction as it heads to Griffith Park. Entering the park, it then becomes signed as Vermont Canyon Road before it passes by the Greek Theatre. The road then ends at the intersection with Observatory Road, the main route to the Griffith Observatory.

== Public transit ==
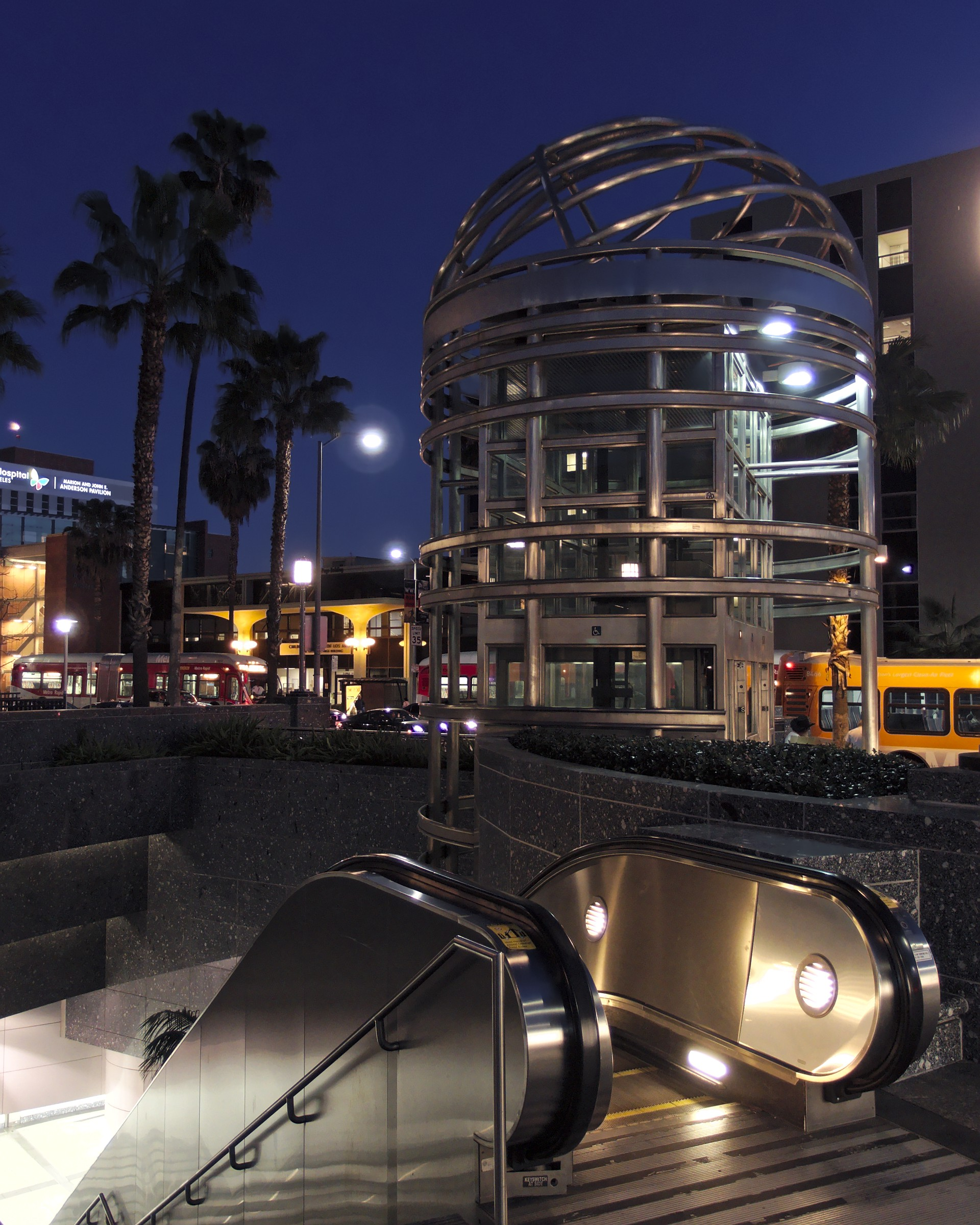
Vermont/Sunset Metro subway station elevator and escalator

=== Subway and light rail ===
Vermont Avenue has the most Metro Rail stations of any street in the Metro subway and light rail system, that include:

- B Line only:
  - Vermont/Sunset station at Sunset Boulevard.
  - Vermont/Santa Monica station Santa Monica Boulevard.
  - Vermont/Beverly station at Beverly Boulevard.
- D Line & B Line:
  - Wilshire/Vermont station at Wilshire Boulevard.
- E Line:
  - Expo/Vermont station at Exposition Boulevard.
- C Line:
  - Vermont/Athens station at the Century Freeway (Interstate 105).

=== Buses ===
- Metro Local Lines 204 and 205, Torrance Transit Line 1, Gardena Transit Line 2, run along Vermont Avenue, as well as Metro Rapid line 754.
- Metro lines 204 and 754 run between Sunset Boulevard and Vermont Green Line Station
- Gardena Line 2 between Interstate 105 and the Harbor Gateway Transit Center, Torrance Transit Line 1 between Gardena Bl and Carson St, and Metro Line 205 to PCH.

Metro lines 204 and 754 use 60-foot (18 m) NABI & New Flyer buses (9500-9594) & (8700-8834)

=== Transit Corridor ===
Metro is planning to rebuild the roadway between the Sunset B Line station and 120th Street. Initial plans call for a bus rapid transit line to operate along the corridor. In the future, Measure M funding is expected to become available for an extension of the B Line subway down Vermont Avenue at least as far as the neighborhood of Athens (just south of the 105 Freeway), possibly as a combination of both underground and elevated heavy rail. Bus rapid transit implementation is expected as part of the Twenty-eight by '28 initiative, in anticipation of the 2028 Summer Olympics. Rail funding is planned for 2067. The service was dubbed the R Line in 2018, though line names are tentative until opening.

=== Los Angeles Railway ===
Until 1963, Vermont Avenue was served by several Los Angeles Railway Yellow Car streetcar lines: the F, R, S, U, and V. After streetcars ceased running under the Los Angeles Metropolitan Transit Authority, tracks were torn up and service replaced by buses.

== Landmarks ==
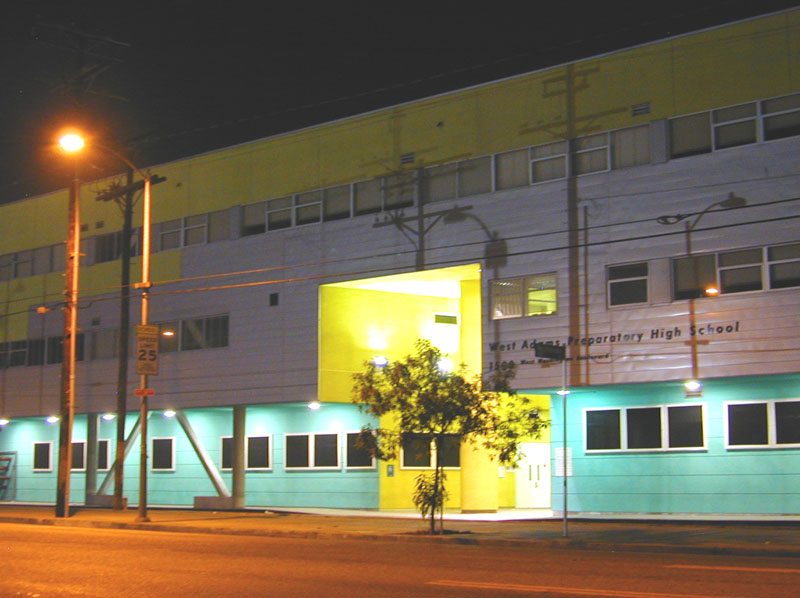
West Adams Preparatory High School, at Vermont Avenue and Washington Blvd

Several Los Angeles Historic-Cultural Monuments are located on Vermont: Petitfils Residence, North Vermont Avenue Moreton Bay Fig Trees, Hollywood Sikh Temple, Dante's View, and Disney Brothers Studio. Other landmarks on Vermont include the Greek Theatre, Pack Theater, the Islamic Center of Southern California, Lucas Museum of Narrative Art, John Muir Branch Library, Crenshaw Christian Center, and Roosevelt Memorial Park Cemetery.

Parks on Vermont include Griffith, Exposition, Helen Keller, Rosecrans, and Ken Malloy Harbor Regional. Hospitals include Kaiser Permanente Hollywood, Kaiser Permanente South Bay, Children's Hospital Los Angeles, and Harbor-UCLA Medical Center. Colleges/universities include Los Angeles City College, the Braille Institute, West Coast University, Hubbard College of Administration, and University of Southern California. Other schools on Vermont include Frank Del Olmo Elementary, Vermont Avenue Elementary, Gerald A. Lawson Academy, Washington Primary Center, Virgil Middle School, John Muir Middle School, West Adams Preparatory High, Manual Arts High, and New Langston Hughes Academy.

== See also ==
- Streets in Los Angeles County, California
- Public transportation in Los Angeles County, California
