= Vermont/Beverly station =

Rapid transit station in Los Angeles, California

Vermont/Beverly
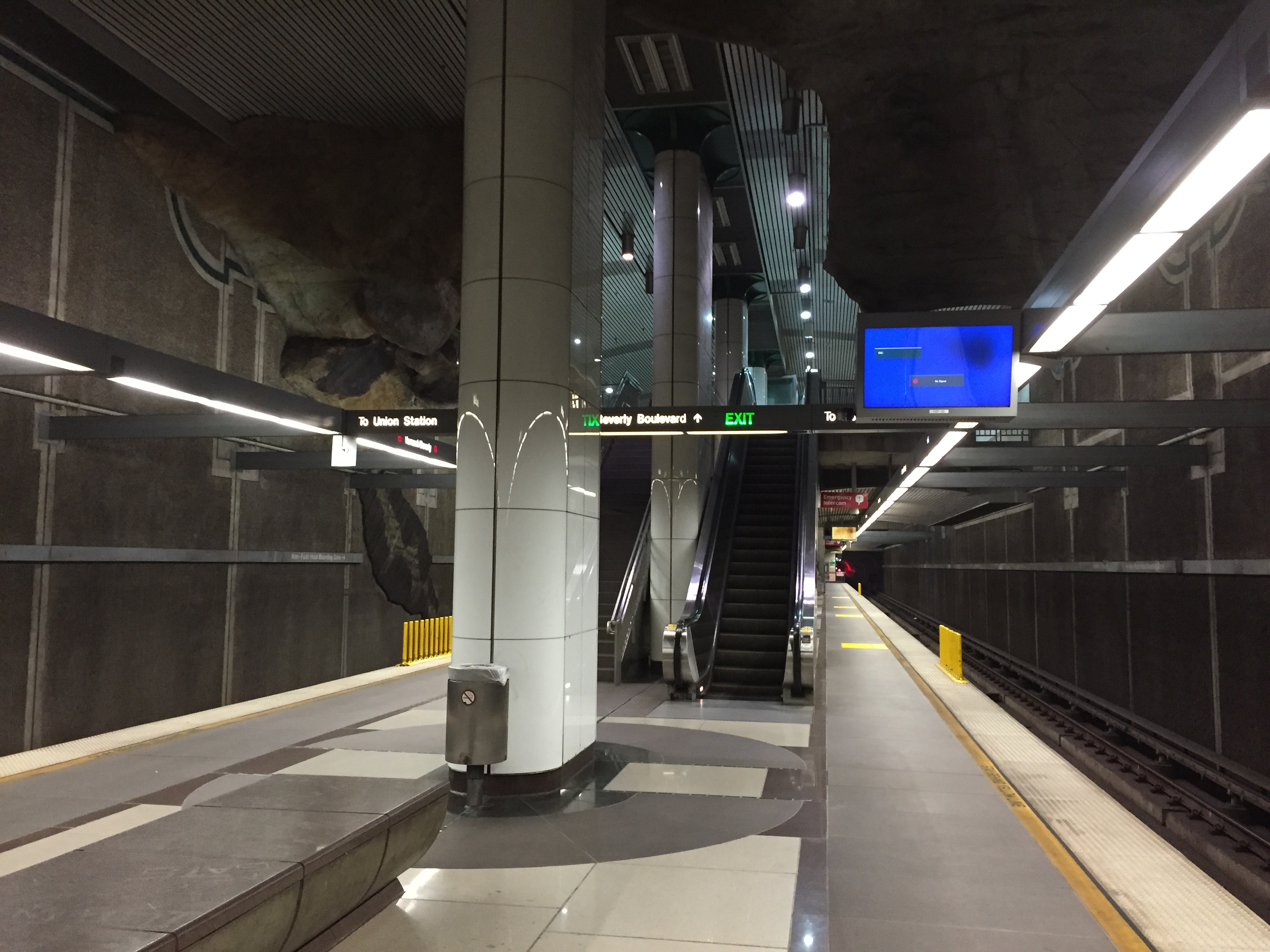
- Vermont/Beverly station platform

General information
- Location: 301 North Vermont Avenue; Los Angeles, California
- Coordinates: 34.0764°N 118.2917°W
- Owner: Los Angeles Metro
- Platforms: 1 island platform
- Tracks: 2
- Connections: Los Angeles Metro Bus

Construction
- Structure type: Underground
- Cycle facilities: Metro Bike Share station and racks
- Architect: Anil Verma Associates & George Stone

History
- Opened: June 12, 1999

Passengers
- FY 2025: 2,017 (avg. wkdy boardings)

Services
Preceding station	Metro Rail	Following station
Vermont/Santa Monica toward North Hollywood	B Line	Wilshire/Vermont toward Union Station
Location

Vermont/Beverly station is an underground rapid transit station on the B Line of the Los Angeles Metro Rail system. It is located under Vermont Avenue at its intersection with Beverly Boulevard, after which the station is named, near the border of the Los Angeles neighborhoods of East Hollywood and Wilshire Center.

== Service ==
=== Station layout ===
Vermont/Beverly is a two-story station; the top level is a mezzanine with ticket machines while the bottom is the platform level. The station uses an island platform with two tracks.

=== Hours and frequency ===
B Line trains run every day between approximately 4:30 a.m. and midnight. Trains operate every 10 minutes during peak hours. Early morning and night service is approximately every 20 minutes.

=== Connections ===
As of spring 2024, the following connections are available:

- Los Angeles Metro Bus: 14, 204, Rapid 754

=== Future ===
A future station is planned for the Vermont Transit Corridor at Vermont/Beverly station, connecting with the B Line.

== Station artwork ==
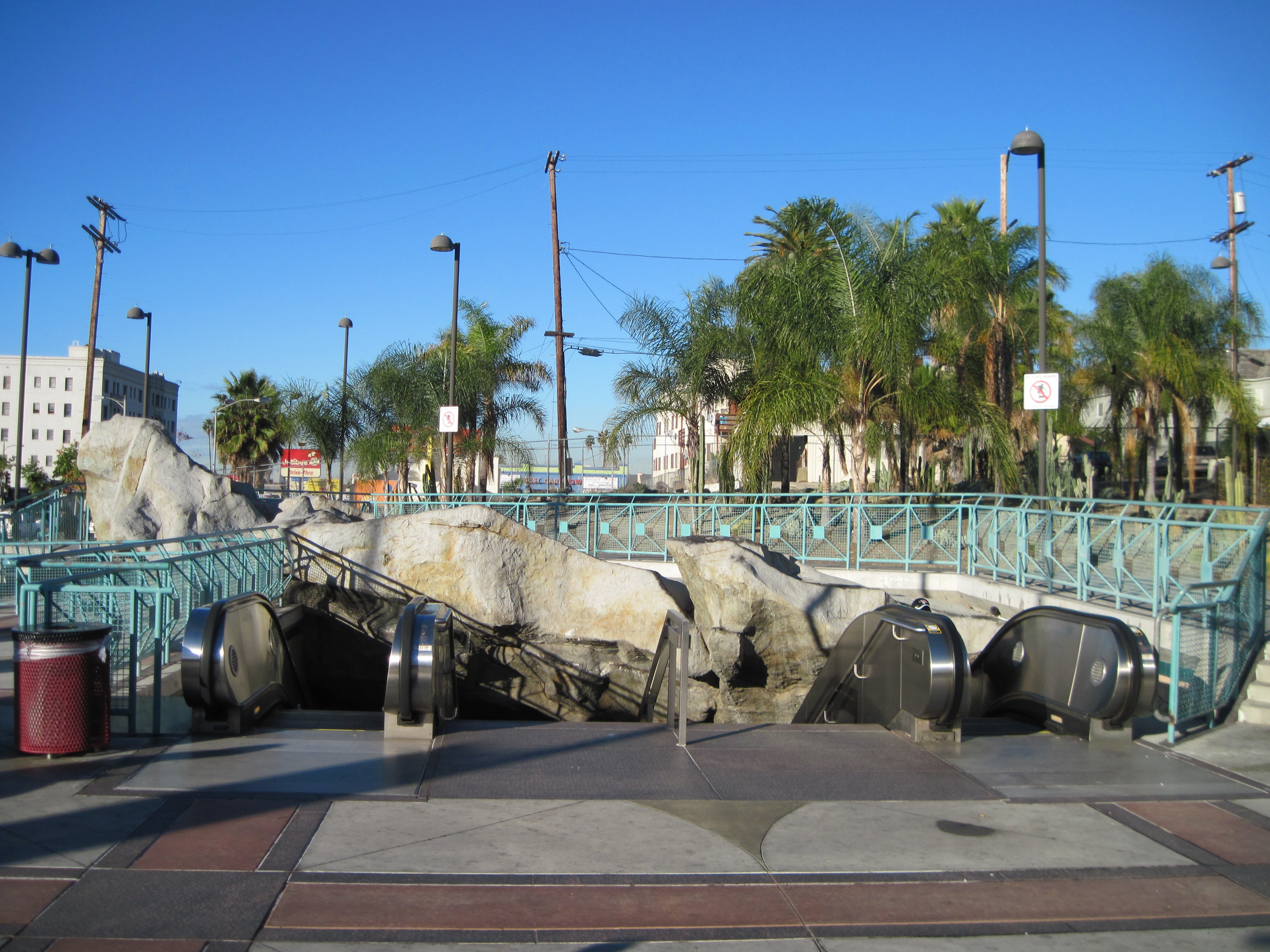
The entrance of the station with its natural-looking rock formations

Vermont/Beverly, like many of the B Line stations, was designed by an artist/architect team. For this station, artist George Stone collaborated with architects Anil Verma Associates. Their design features natural-looking rock formations on all levels of the station, which purposefully contrast with the glass-clad columns soaring from the station platform.

Artist George Stone designed the rocks based on the geology of the station location. The artist and architects said they embraced the concept of inserting the uniquely shaped rocks into the traditional shape of a station "box."

The design is meant to remind riders that the station exists within a natural geological setting, while the artificial nature of the rocks recalls the props used on nearby Hollywood sets and the area's theme parks.
