= V (Los Angeles Railway) =

Overview
- Owner: Los Angeles Metropolitan Transit Authority
- Locale: Los Angeles, Vernon
- Termini: Vermont Avenue and Monroe Street; Pacific Crossing
- Stations: 50

Service
- Type: Streetcar
- System: Los Angeles Railway; Los Angeles Metropolitan Transit Authority

History
- Opened: June 1913
- Closed: March 31, 1963

Technical
- Track gauge: 3 ft 6 in (1,067 mm)
- Electrification: Overhead line, 600 V DC

V was a streetcar service in Los Angeles, California. It was operated by the Los Angeles Railway from 1920 to 1958, and by the Los Angeles Metropolitan Transit Authority from 1958 to 1963.

== History ==
The Vermont–Vernon line was the last new route built by the Los Angeles Railway. Although Henry Huntington had been reluctant to build any cross-town (circumferential) lines, exponential growth along the Wilshire Corridor made it necessary. At the time, Los Angeles had no buses. The Dalton–Vernon Avenue line opened in June 1913 as an extension of the University line. Pacific Electric had delayed construction of a crossing along their Long Beach Line, and this required passengers to transfer by foot across the tracks to make a full trip on the Yellow Cars. That October, the Vernon line was through-routed with the Vermont line between First and the PE crossing. From Vermont and Beverly, the route ran south on Vermont Avenue to Vernon Avenue, thence east on Vernon to Pacific Boulevard, then east again on Leonis Boulevard to Downey Road in Vernon. A branch line also ran from Vernon Avenue south on Santa Fe Avenue to Slauson Avenue. The forced transfer at the PE crossing persisted into 1915.

In 1921, the route was designated as line V. The line was extended both north and south in 1923. In 1925, plans had been drawn up to extend the Vermont line over 2 miles (3.2 km) further north to Los Feliz Boulevard. Instead, the route was extended less than a mile north to Monroe Street and west on Monroe to Heliotrope, on what was then the campus of UCLA (what is now the campus of Los Angeles City College). In 1955, during the Los Angeles Transit Lines era, the Leonis and Santa Fe branches were eliminated; instead the V line ended at a loop, called Pacific Crossing, in the center of Vernon.

The V was one of six routes that survived closure and passed into control of the Los Angeles Metropolitan Transit Authority. It was the only cross-town route in the LAMTA era. Streetcar service over the former Los Angeles Railway lines ended after March 31, 1963, with the final scheduled trip made on the V line.

== Partial restoration ==
Vermont Avenue continued its growth, seeded by the robust public transportation provided by the streetcar. The Red Line rapid transit corridor was built underneath the road north of Wilshire by the Los Angeles County Metropolitan Transportation Authority in the early 1990s, reestablishing a new rail service over a portion of the route (albeit underground).

By 2020, the bus lines operating on Vermont had grown to ridership of 45,000 weekday boardings, making it the second busiest corridor in the network. As a result, Los Angeles County Metropolitan Transportation Authority intends to rehabilitate the road for to allow for rapid transit. The corridor extends further south than the old V streetcar and may initially operate as bus rapid transit with more limited service than its progenitor.

== Rolling stock ==
After 1955, PCC streetcars replaced the old rolling stock on the line.

== See also ==
- Streetcars in Los Angeles
