= Vermont/Sunset station =

Rapid transit station in Los Angeles, California

Vermont/Sunset
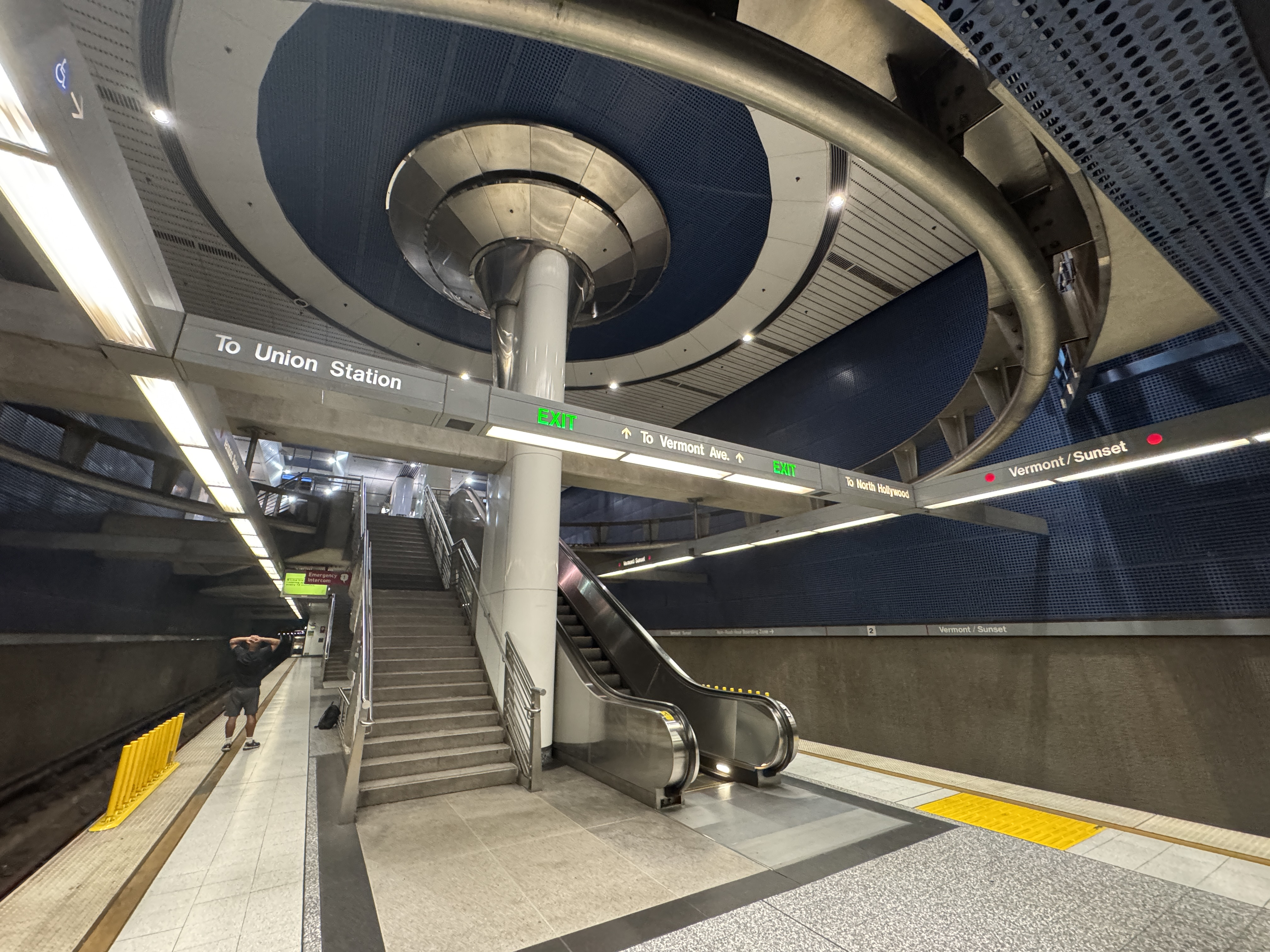
- Vermont/Sunset station platform and ceiling design

General information
- Location: 1500 North Vermont Avenue; Los Angeles, California
- Coordinates: 34.0983°N 118.2917°W
- Owner: Los Angeles Metro
- Platforms: 1 island platform
- Tracks: 2
- Connections: Los Angeles Metro Bus; LADOT DASH

Construction
- Structure type: Underground
- Cycle facilities: Metro Bike Share station and lockers
- Architect: Diedrich Architects and Michael Davies

History
- Opened: June 12, 1999

Passengers
- FY 2026: 2,249 (avg. wkdy boardings)

Services
Preceding station	Metro Rail	Following station
Hollywood/Western toward North Hollywood	B Line	Vermont/Santa Monica toward Union Station
Future services
Preceding station	Metro Busway	Following station
Terminus	Vermont Transit Corridor	Santa Monica toward Athens
Location

Vermont/Sunset station is an underground rapid transit station on the B Line of the Los Angeles Metro Rail system. It is located under Vermont Avenue at its intersection with Sunset Boulevard, after which the station is named, in the Los Feliz, Silver Lake, and Little Armenia neighborhoods of East Hollywood in Los Angeles.

The intersection of Vermont and Sunset is home to three major area hospitals: Kaiser Permanente Los Angeles Medical Center, Children's Hospital Los Angeles and Hollywood Presbyterian Medical Center.

The station also provides elevator access outside Kaiser Permanente, directly adjacent to and across the street from the main subway station entrance.

== Service ==
=== Station layout ===
Vermont/Sunset is a two-story station; the top level is a mezzanine with ticket machines while the bottom is the platform level. The station uses a simple island platform with two tracks.

=== Hours and frequency ===
B Line trains run every day between approximately 4:30 a.m. and midnight. Trains operate every 10 minutes during peak hours. Early morning and night service is approximately every 20 minutes.

=== Connections ===
As of September 10, 2023, the following connections are available:

- LADOT DASH: Hollywood, Los Feliz, Observatory
- Los Angeles Metro Bus: 2, 182, 204, 206, 217, Rapid 754

=== Future ===
A future station is planned for the Vermont Transit Corridor at Vermont/Sunset station, connecting with the B Line.

== Station design ==
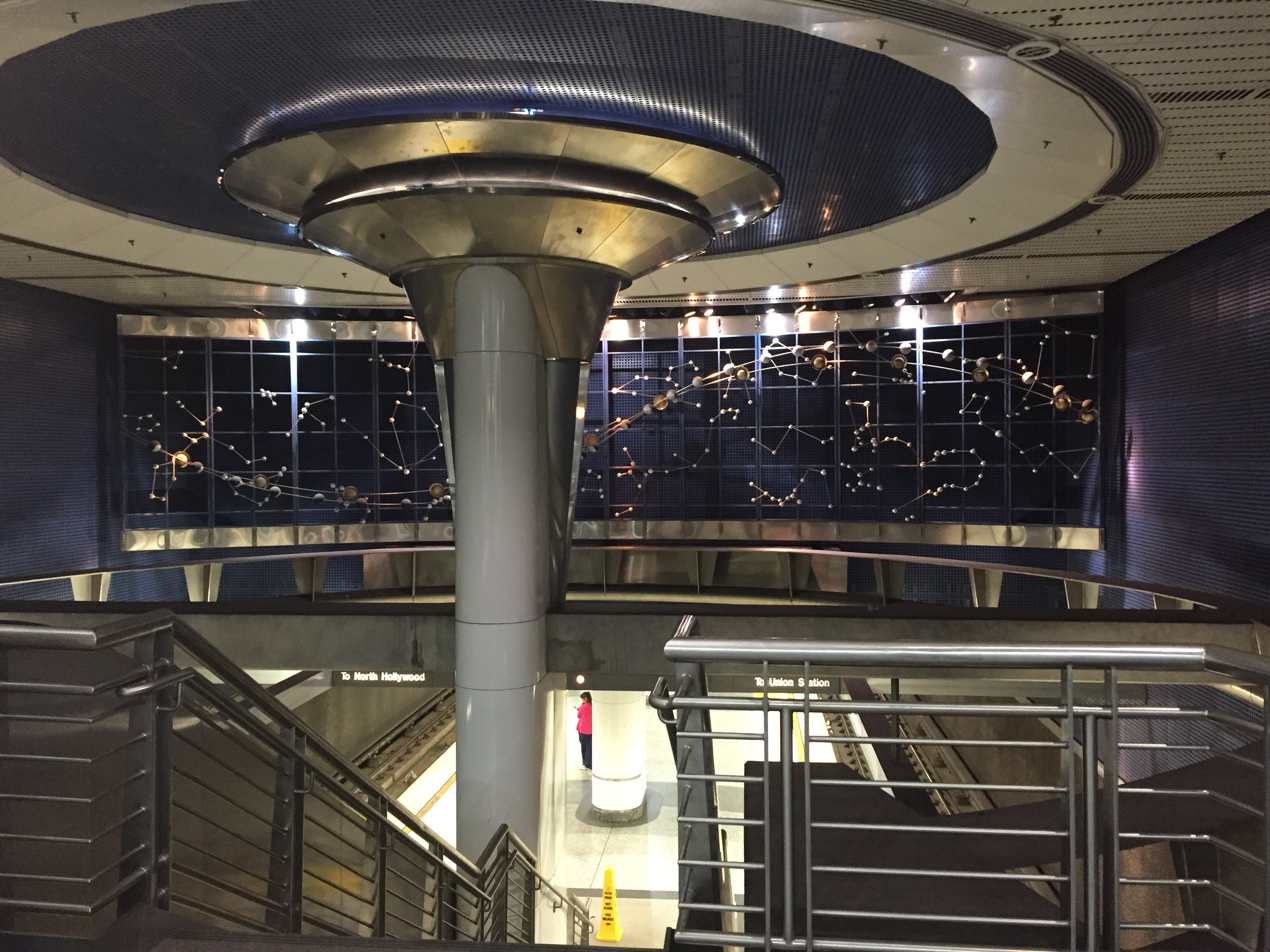
Vermont/Sunset station mezzanine

Vermont/Sunset, like many of the B Line stations, was designed by an artist/architect team. For this station, artist Michael Davies collaborated with the architectural firm Diedrich Architects. Their design features iconography that is commonly shared by astronomy and medicine, a nod to the hospitals surrounding the station and the nearby Griffith Park Observatory. The station floor and walls are inlaid with patterns of celestial orbits and microscopic images of life forms. Overhead a star chart maps the earth's placement in the universe. The building that houses the elevator at street level is domed, echoing the design of the observatory.
