= Vermont/Athens station =

Los Angeles Metro Rail station

Vermont/Athens
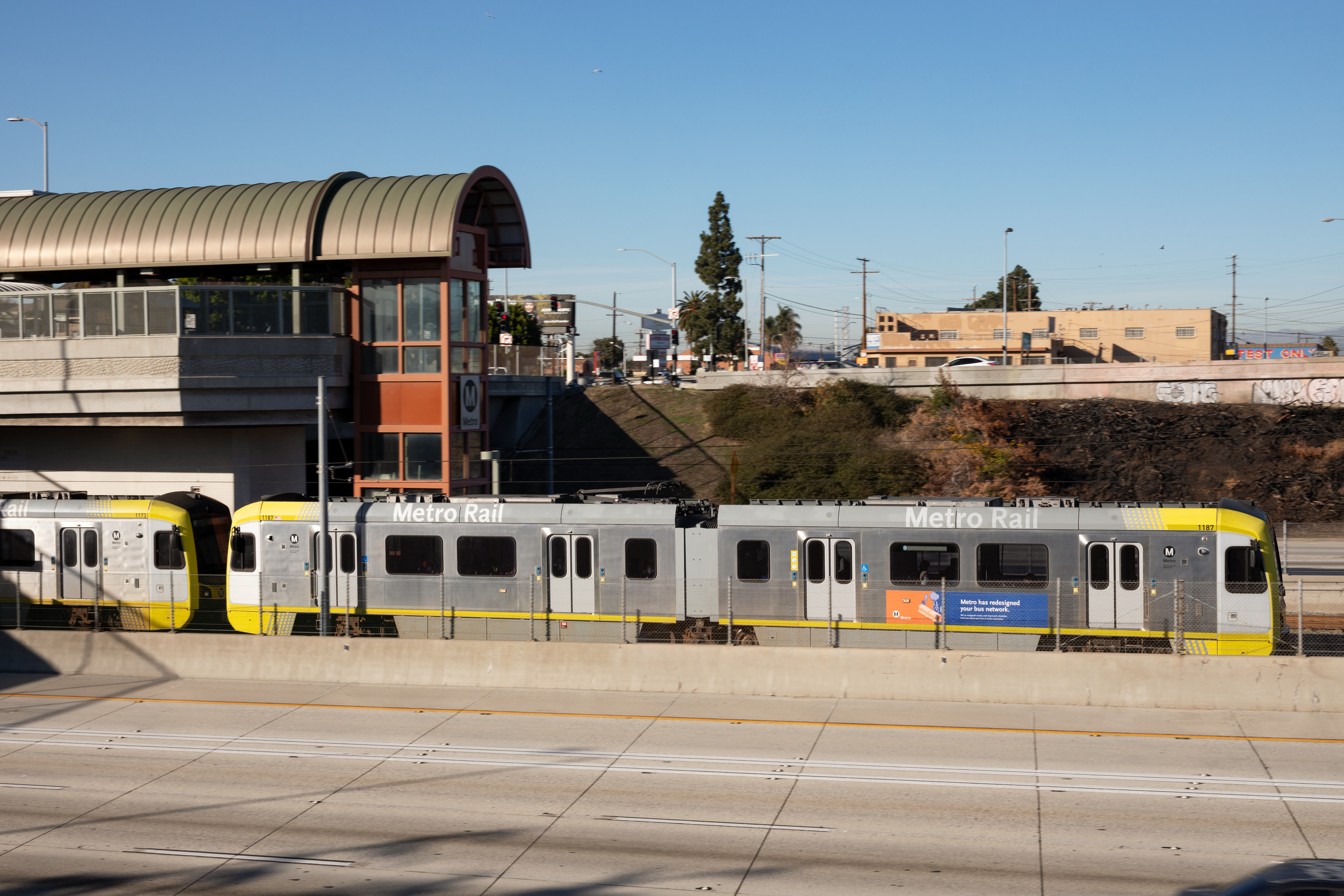
- C Line train departs Vermont/Athens station

General information
- Location: 11603 South Vermont Avenue; Athens, California
- Coordinates: 33.9287°N 118.2918°W
- Owner: Los Angeles County Metropolitan Transportation Authority
- Platforms: 1 island platform
- Tracks: 2
- Connections: GTrans; Los Angeles Metro Bus; The Link

Construction
- Structure type: Freeway median, below-grade
- Parking: 155 spaces
- Accessible: Yes

History
- Opened: August 12, 1995
- Former names: Vermont Ave/I-105 (1995–2000); Vermont (2000–2012)

Passengers
- FY 2026: 1,452 (avg. wkdy boardings)

Services
| Preceding station | Metro Rail | Following station |
|---|---|---|
| Crenshaw toward LAX | C Line | Harbor Freeway toward Norwalk |
Former services
| Preceding station | Pacific Electric | Following station |
|---|---|---|
| Strawberry Park toward San Pedro | San Pedro via Gardena | Forest toward Pacific Electric Building |
| Strawberry Park toward Clifton | Redondo Beach via Gardena | Forest toward Pacific Electric Building |
| Westbridge toward Clifton | Hawthorne–El Nido | Forest toward Pacific Electric Building |
| Preceding station | Los Angeles Railway | Following station |
| Terminus | F | Vermont and 108th toward Union Station |
Future services
| Preceding station | Metro Busway | Following station |
|---|---|---|
| Century toward Sunset | Vermont Transit Corridor | Terminus |
Location

Vermont/Athens station is a below-grade light rail station on the C Line of the Los Angeles Metro Rail system. It is situated in the median of Interstate 105 (Century Freeway) and named after Vermont Avenue and the Athens community where it is located. It opened as part of the Green Line on August 12, 1995.

The station was initially named Vermont Ave/I-105 but was later simplified to Vermont/Athens in 2012 with its location clarified.

== Service ==
=== Hours and frequency ===
C Line service hours are approximately from 4:00 a.m. until 12:30 a.m. daily. Trains operate every 10 minutes throughout the day. Night and early morning weekend service is every 20 minutes.

=== Connections ===
As of June 6, 2025, the following connections are available:

- GTrans (Gardena): 2
- Los Angeles Metro Bus: 204, 206, Rapid 754
- the Link: Athens

=== Future ===
A future station is planned for the Vermont Transit Corridor at Vermont/Athens station, connecting with the C Line.

== History ==
The station's site is near the former Delta station on the San Pedro via Gardena Line of the Pacific Electric. It was also the southern terminus of the Los Angeles Railway F Line, allowing interchanges between the two systems. Pacific Electric service ended in 1940, while the F Line ran until 1955.
