= Metro Bike Share =

Bike sharing system in Los Angeles, California, United States

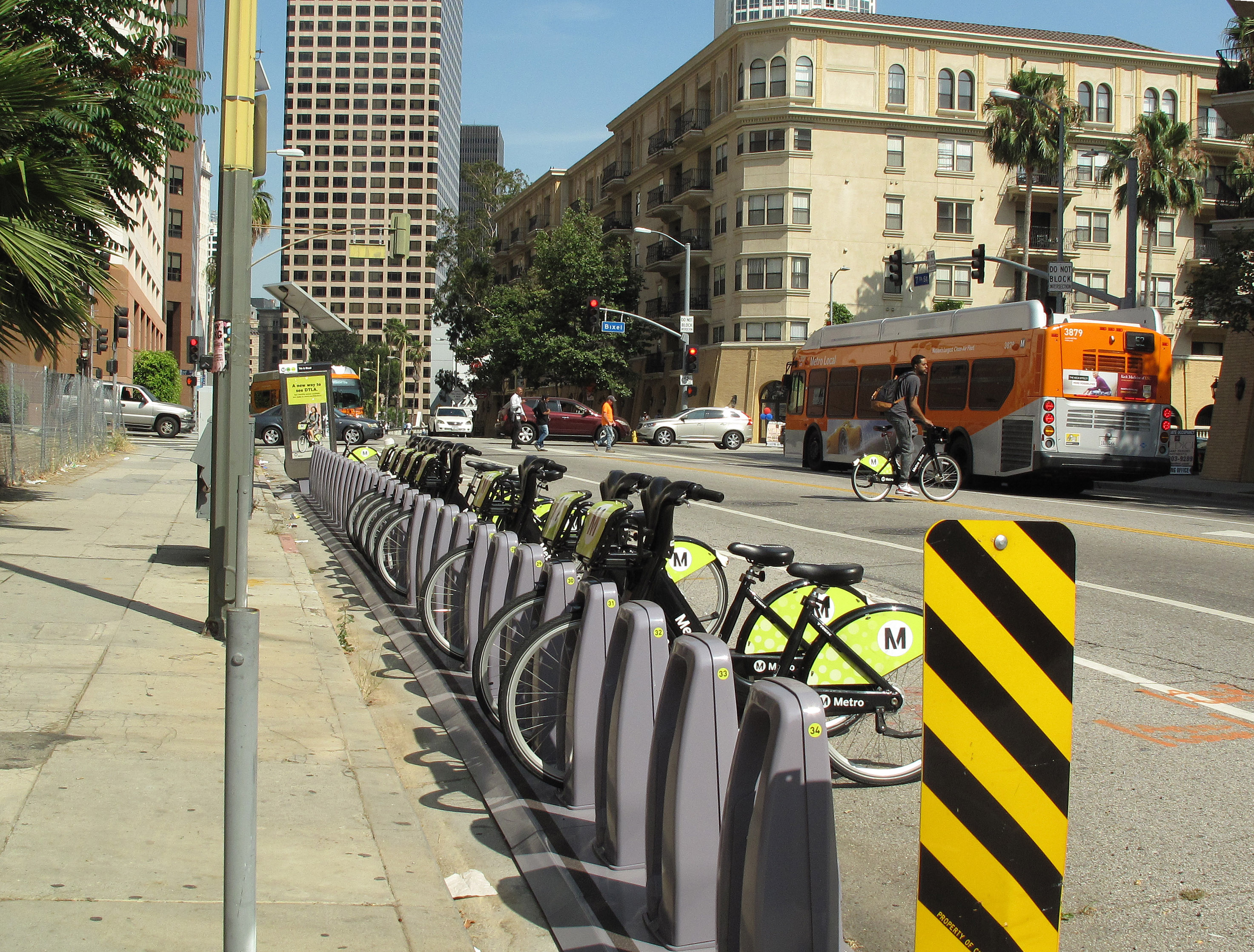
- Bike share station in Downtown LA

Overview
- Owner: Los Angeles Metro (Metro)
- Locale: Los Angeles County
- Transit type: Bicycle-sharing system
- Number of stations: 93
- Website: bikeshare.metro.net

Operation
- Began operation: July 7, 2016; 10 years ago
- Operator: Bicycle Transit Systems
- Number of vehicles: 1,400

Metro Bike Share is a bicycle sharing system in the Los Angeles, California metropolitan area. The service was launched on July 7, 2016. It is administered by the Los Angeles Metro and is operated by Bicycle Transit Systems, a national bikeshare operator. The system uses a fleet of about 1,400 bikes and includes 93 stations in Downtown Los Angeles, Venice, and the Port of Los Angeles.

== History ==
Compared to other U.S. cities, Los Angeles was relatively late in implementing a municipal bike sharing program. Efforts to create such a program failed in 2013, and at one point the city was the only one of the ten largest U.S. cities to lack a bike sharing system. The city council approved a plan in August 2015 to create a downtown pilot program that would function as a partnership between Metro and the city. The system began operations on July 7, 2016, with 1,000 bikes and 65 stations in Downtown Los Angeles.

In July 2017, Metro Bike Share expanded to Pasadena and the Port of Los Angeles with 30 and 13 new stations, respectively. The system further expanded to the Venice Beach/Santa Monica area in September 2017 with 15 new stations. After a little more than a year of operation, the Pasadena service was canceled in September 2018 due to low ridership and high operating costs. Employees are unionized under the Transport Workers Union Local 200.

Metro Bike Share is the first bike share system in the U.S. to be integrated as part of the city's existing public transit system. While other cities' bike share systems are usually operated by the municipal transportation department or an independent group, L.A.'s bike share is operated by Metro and allows riders to purchase rides using the same regional TAP card that is used on Metro's buses and trains.

The city has plans to eventually allow riders to transfer directly between Metro buses and trains and Metro Bike Share for no additional cost.

Philadelphia-based Bicycle Transit Systems (BTS) was the original contractor, under a contract that expired in 2024. Lyft Urban Solutions was deemed the most qualified bidder by Metro staff in re-procurements in 2024 and 2025, but due to protests by BTS over conflicts of interest and by BTS staff of reduced wages, the contract will be extended on a month-to-month basis until May 2026.

== Fares ==
Metro Bike Share charges for single rides at a rate of $1.75 for every 30 minutes. They also offer long-term passes for $5 per day, $17 per month, and $150 per year, which allows riders to take an unlimited number of free trips that are less than 30 minutes. However, riders must pay $1.75 for every 30 minutes beyond the first 30 minutes, even if they have a long-term pass.

Riders can use the TAP card to purchase passes, but they have to set up a separate account for Metro Bike Share. Stored value and passes associated with Metro's other services or other regional bike share systems are not valid for use with Metro Bike Share, and there are no discounted or free transfers to or from those services as of October 2018. Riders can also purchase rides without a TAP card by using their credit or debit card at the bike station kiosk.
