= Manchester station (Los Angeles Metro) =

Bus rapid transit station in Los Angeles, California

Manchester
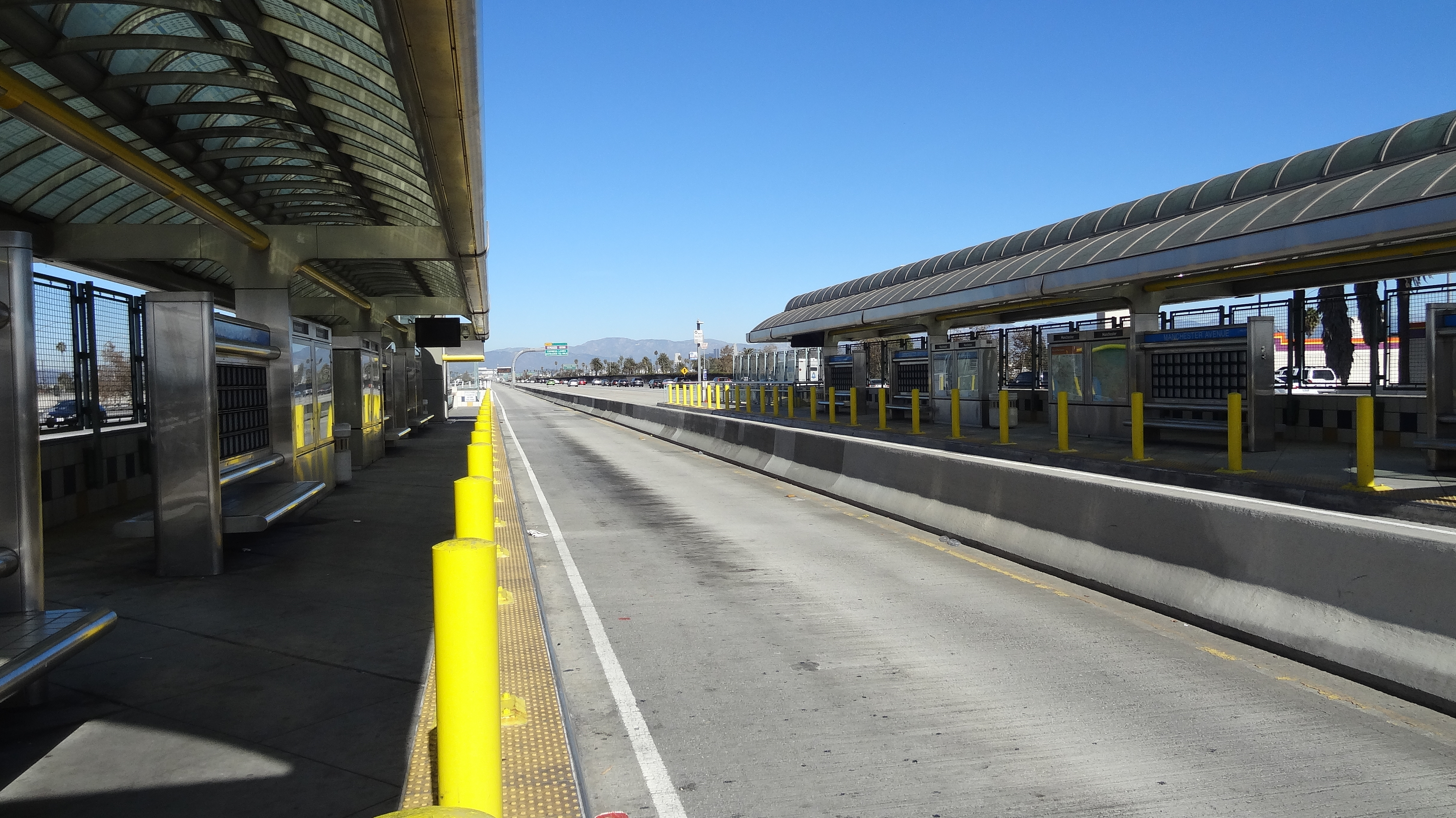
- Manchester station platform

General information
- Location: 452 1/2 West Manchester Avenue; Los Angeles, California
- Coordinates: 33°57′36″N 118°16′51″W
- Owner: Caltrans
- Operator: Los Angeles Metro
- Line: See Services section
- Platforms: 2 side platforms

Construction
- Structure type: Elevated
- Parking: 247 spaces
- Accessible: Yes

History
- Opened: August 1, 1996

Passengers
- FY 2025: 843 (avg. wkdy boardings, J Line)

Services
Preceding station	Metro Busway	Following station
Harbor Freeway toward Harbor Gateway or San Pedro	J Line	Slauson toward El Monte
Location

Manchester station is a Bus station in Los Angeles, California. It is between the Slauson and Harbor Freeway stations on the J Line, a bus rapid transit route which runs between El Monte, Downtown Los Angeles and San Pedro as part of the Los Angeles Metro Busway system. The station consists of two side platforms in the center of Interstate 110 above Manchester Avenue.

Manchester station was built between 1989 and 1996 as part of the Harbor Transitway and opened to passengers on August 1, 1996. J Line buses serve the station twenty-four hours a day; the headway between buses is about four minutes during peak periods, with less frequent service at other times. Manchester station is also served by several Los Angeles Metro Bus and Torrance Transit bus services, most of which only run during weekday peak periods.

== Station layout ==
Manchester station is situated along the Harbor Transitway and consists of two side platforms in the median of the Interstate 110 (Harbor Freeway). The station is located near the Vermont Knolls, Vermont Vista, Florence and Broadway-Manchester neighborhoods of Los Angeles.

The busway platforms are accessed from two ground-level plazas on the north and south sides of East Manchester Avenue between South Figueroa Street and South Broadway or a pedestrian bridge from the east park and ride lot. The ground-level plazas each have a TAP card ticket vending machine that was added in early 2017 to support all-door boarding on the J Line. The station has 247 park and ride spaces in two parking lots built into the "leaves" of the partial cloverleaf interchange between Manchester Avenue and Interstate 110.

== Services ==
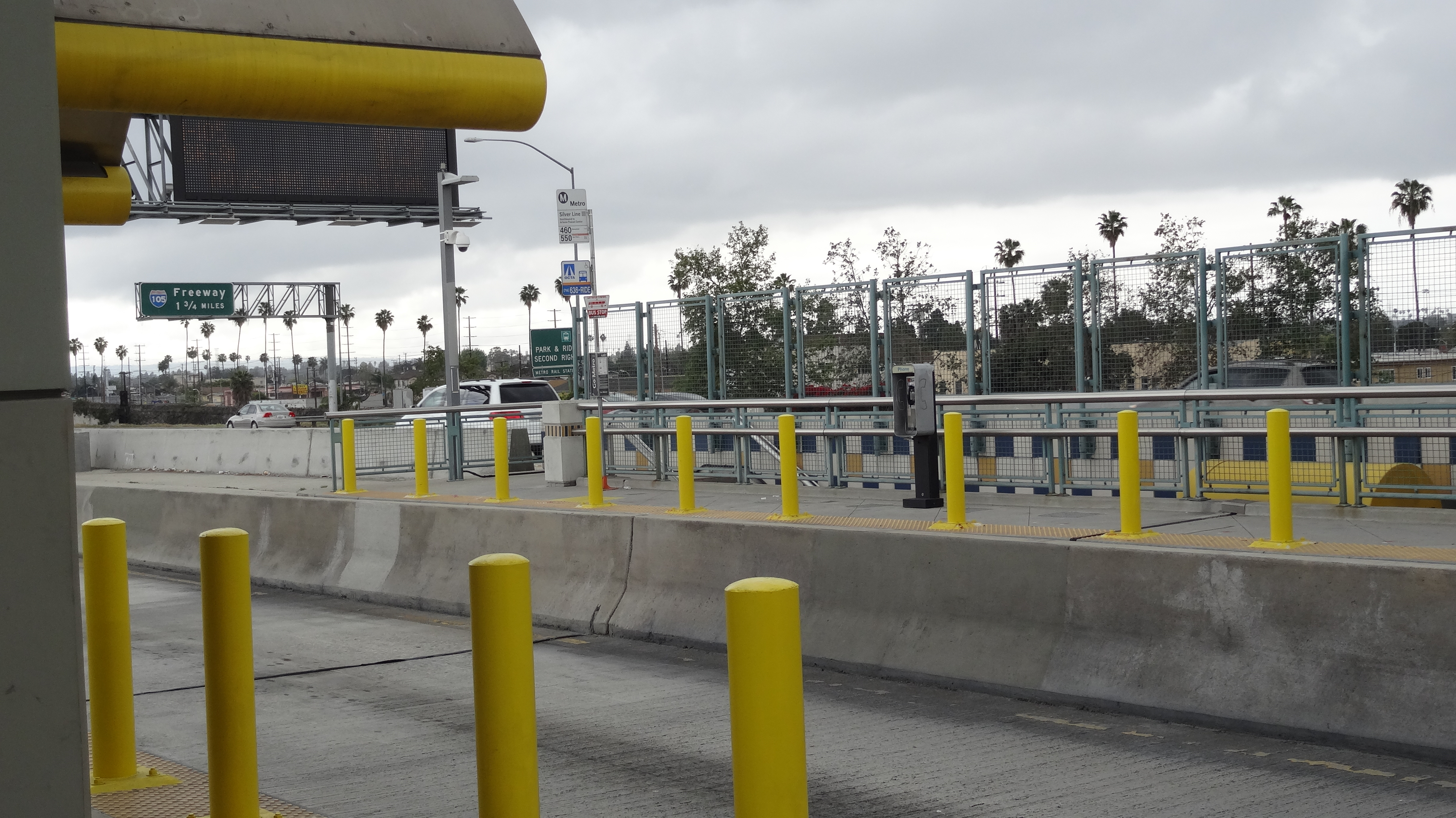
Southbound platform station exit towards the street level.

Manchester station is used by the Metro J Line bus rapid transit route which runs between El Monte station in El Monte, Downtown Los Angeles and the Harbor Gateway Transit Center in Gardena, California, with select trips continuing onto San Pedro. The J Line is part of the Los Angeles Metro Busway system.

J Line buses run 24 hours a day between El Monte, Downtown Los Angeles, and the Harbor Gateway Transit Center, as route 910. Some trips continue to San Pedro between 6 a.m. and 8 p.m. and are signed as Route 950. On weekdays, buses operate every four to eight minutes during peak hours. They operate every 10 minutes in the midday, 20 minutes during evenings, 40 minutes during nights, and every hour overnight. On weekends, buses arrive every 15 minutes most of the day. They operate every 20 minutes during evenings, 40 minutes during nights, and every hour overnight.

In addition to J Line buses, the busway platforms at Manchester station are also served by the all-day Los Angeles Metro Bus route 460 to Disneyland. There are also several routes that use the busway, geared towards people commuting to Los Angeles, operating only during weekday rush-hours, operating towards the city in the morning and returning at night: LA Metro Bus route 550 to San Pedro; and Torrance Transit route 4X to Torrance (also operates all-day Saturday). The station is also served by the Dodger Stadium Express shuttle that operates during home games during baseball season.

Manchester station is also served by several bus routes that use bus stops near to the station on surface streets: LA Metro Bus route 45 that runs between Lincoln Heights and Rosewood via Broadway, 81 that runs between Eagle Rock and South Los Angeles via Figueroa, and 115 that runs between Playa del Rey and Norwalk via Manchester.
