= Rosecrans station =

Bus rapid transit station in Los Angeles, California

Rosecrans
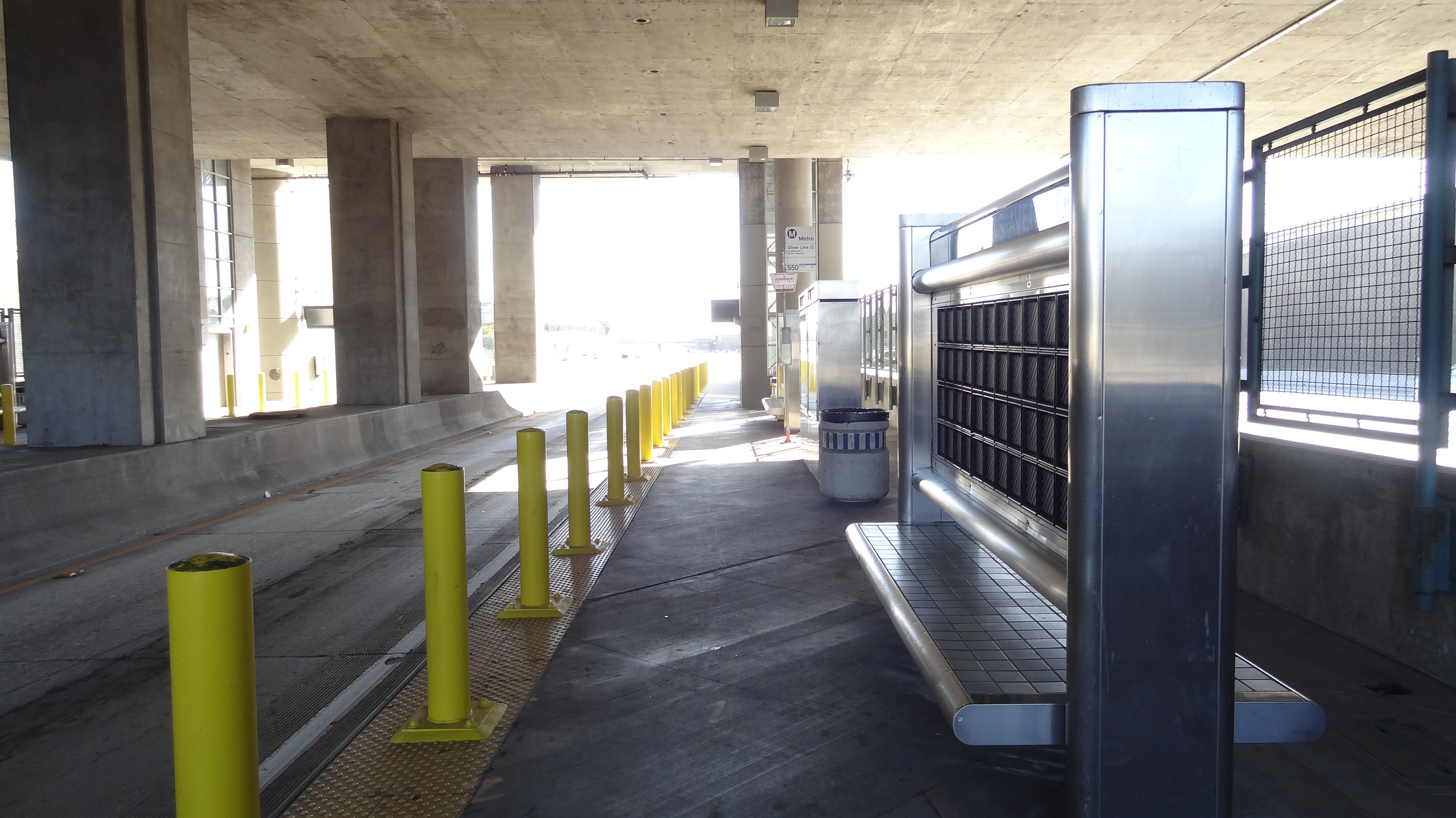
- Rosecrans station platform

General information
- Location: 622 West Rosecrans Avenue; Los Angeles, California
- Coordinates: 33°54′07″N 118°17′12″W
- Owner: Caltrans
- Operator: Los Angeles Metro
- Line: See Services section
- Platforms: 2 side platforms
- Connections: Metro Local

Construction
- Structure type: Below-grade
- Parking: 202 spaces
- Accessible: Yes

History
- Opened: August 1, 1996

Passengers
- FY 2025: 538 (avg. wkdy boardings, J Line)

Services
Preceding station	Metro Busway	Following station
Harbor Gateway Transit Center Terminus	J Line 910	Harbor Freeway toward El Monte
Harbor Gateway Transit Center toward San Pedro	J Line 950	Harbor Freeway toward El Monte
Location

Rosecrans station is a busway station located in Los Angeles, California. It is situated between the Harbor Freeway station and the Harbor Gateway Transit Center on the J Line, a bus rapid transit route which runs between El Monte, Downtown Los Angeles and San Pedro as part of the Metro Busway system. The station consists of two side platforms in the center of Interstate 110 under Rosecrans Avenue. The station serves the Harbor Gateway neighborhoods of Los Angeles.

Rosecrans station was built between 1989 and 1996 as part of the Harbor Transitway project and opened to passengers on August 1, 1996. J Line buses serve the station twenty-four hours a day; the headway between buses is about four minutes during peak periods, with less frequent service at other times. Rosecrans station is also served by Metro Express route 550 and Torrance Transit route 4, which only run during weekday peak periods.

== Layout ==
The below-grade platforms are accessed from two ground-level plazas on the north and south sides of East Rosecrans Avenue between Figueroa Street and Vermont Avenue. The ground-level plazas each have a TAP card ticket vending machine that was added in early 2017 to support all-door boarding on the J Line. The station has 202 park and ride spaces in a parking lot built into one of the "leaves" of the partial cloverleaf interchange between Rosecrans Avenue and Interstate 110.

== Services ==
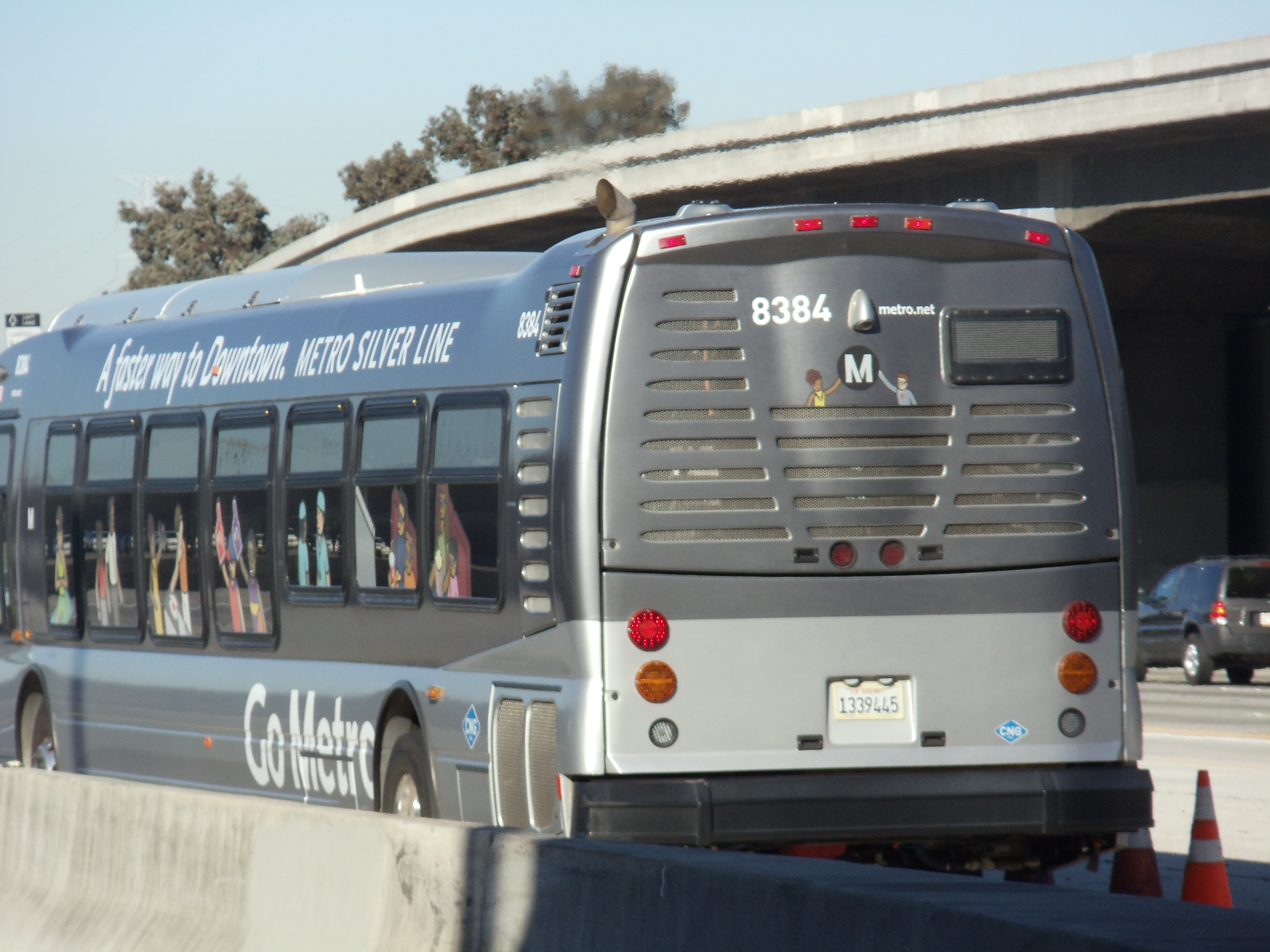
Metro J Line bus departing Rosecrans to Downtown LA & El Monte in the afternoon

Rosecrans station is used by the Metro J Line bus rapid transit route which runs between El Monte station in El Monte, Downtown Los Angeles and the Harbor Gateway Transit Center in Gardena, California, with select trips continuing onto San Pedro. The J Line is part of the Metro Busway system.

J Line buses run 24 hours a day between El Monte, Downtown Los Angeles, and the Harbor Gateway Transit Center, as route 910. Some trips continue to San Pedro between 6 a.m. and 8 p.m. and are signed as Route 950. On weekdays, buses operate every four to eight minutes during peak hours. They operate every 10 minutes in the midday, 20 minutes during evenings, 40 minutes during nights, and every hour overnight. On weekends, buses arrive every 15 minutes most of the day. They operate every 20 minutes during evenings, 40 minutes during nights, and every hour overnight.

In addition to J Line buses, the busway platforms at Rosecrans station are also served by two routes, geared towards people commuting to Los Angeles, operating only during weekday rush-hours, operating towards the city in the morning and returning at night: Metro Express route 550 to San Pedro and Torrance Transit route 4X to Torrance (also operates all-day Saturday). The station is also served by the Dodger Stadium Express shuttle that operates during home games during baseball season.

At street level, Rosecrans station is also served by Metro Local route 125 that runs between El Segundo and Norwalk station via Rosecrans.
