= Pacific Coast Highway station (J Line) =

Bus rapid transit station in Los Angeles, California

Pacific Coast Hwy
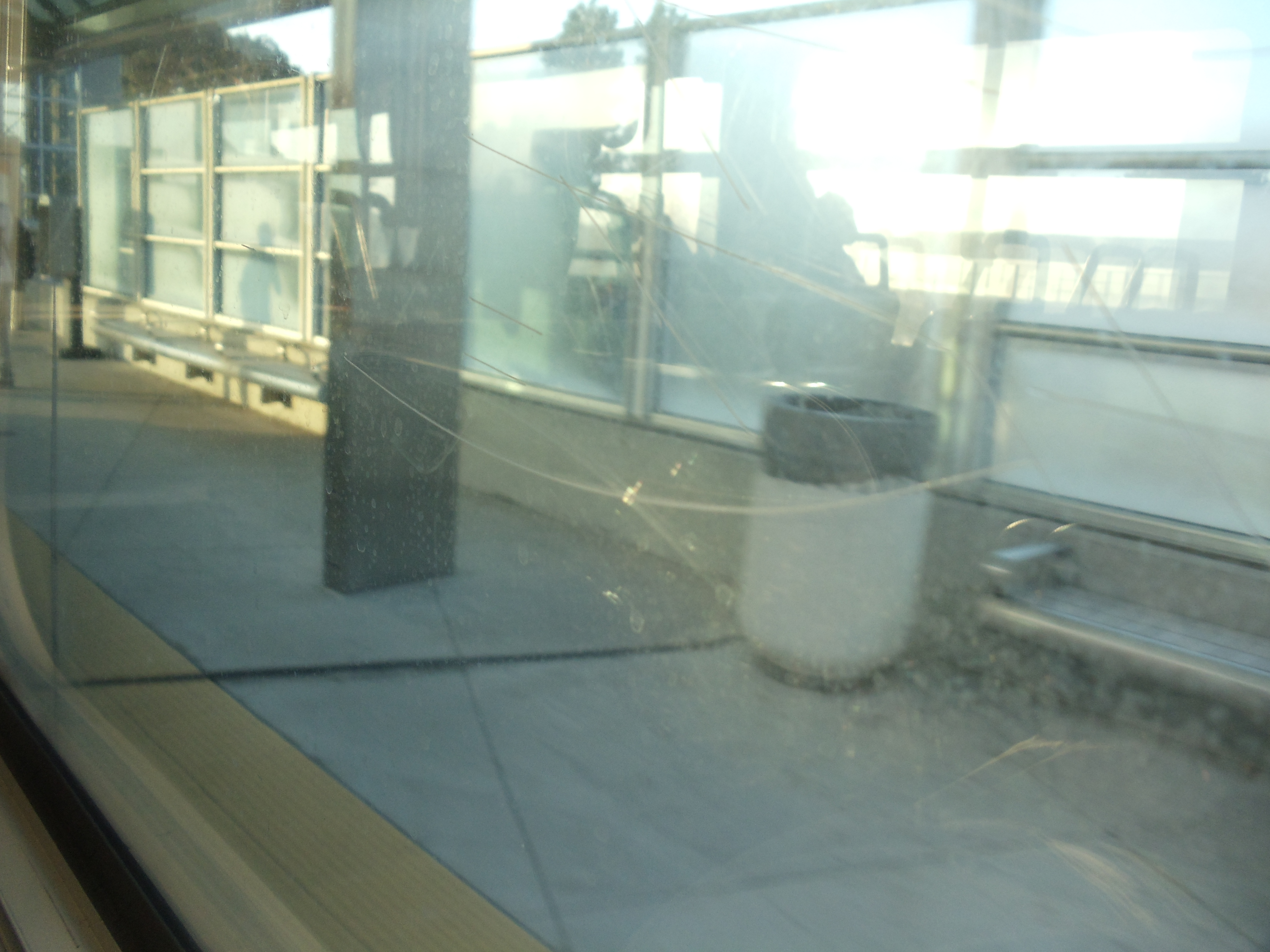
- Pacific Coast Highway station platform, 2012

General information
- Location: 1345 West Pacific Coast Highway; Los Angeles, California
- Coordinates: 33°47′27″N 118°16′56″W
- Platforms: 2 side platforms
- Connections: Los Angeles Metro Bus; LADOT Commuter Express; LADOT DASH

Construction
- Structure type: Elevated
- Parking: 240 spaces
- Accessible: Yes

History
- Opened: November 17, 2000

Passengers
- FY 2025: 223 (avg. wkdy boardings, J Line)

Services
Preceding station	Metro Busway	Following station
San Pedro (at street stops) Terminus	J Line 950	Carson toward El Monte
Location

Pacific Coast Highway station is an elevated busway station on the J Line of the Los Angeles Metro Busway system. The station is located on the shoulder of Interstate 110 at its intersection with Pacific Coast Highway, after which the station is named, in Los Angeles County, California.

It is one of two stations along the Harbor Freeway are outside of the Harbor Transitway, a shared busway and high occupancy toll lane. South of this station the J Line exits the Harbor Freeway and starts serving San Pedro, starting with the Harbor Beacon Park & Ride. Traveling north on I-110 the next station is Carson.

The station is located close to Los Angeles Harbor College, Kaiser Permanente South Bay Medical Center, Ken Malloy Harbor Regional Park, and has a 240 space park and ride lot.

An A Line station with an identical name is located approximately 5.4 miles (8.7 km) east of the station.

== Service ==
=== Station layout ===
The side platforms can be accessed on foot from the Pacific Coast Highway using stairs or elevators. The 240 space park and ride lot is located at Figueroa Street & West Pacific Coast Highway to the east of the station.

=== Hours and frequency ===
On this section of the J Line, buses run between 6 a.m. and 8 p.m. every day, and operate every 30 minutes.

=== Connections ===
As of December 15, 2024, the following connections are available:

- LADOT Commuter Express: 448
- LADOT DASH: Wilmington
- Los Angeles Metro Bus: 205, 232, 246
