= Carson station (Los Angeles Metro) =

Busway station in California, US

Carson

General information
- Location: 743 West Carson Street; West Carson, California
- Coordinates: 33°49′53″N 118°17′14″W
- Platforms: 2 side platforms
- Connections: Long Beach Transit; Los Angeles Metro Bus; Torrance Transit

Construction
- Structure type: Below-grade
- Parking: 143 spaces
- Accessible: Yes

History
- Opened: November 17, 2000

Passengers
- FY 2025: 213 (avg. wkdy boardings, J Line)

Services
Preceding station	Metro Busway	Following station
Pacific Coast Highway toward San Pedro	J Line 950	Harbor Gateway Transit Center (stops en route) toward El Monte
Location

Carson station is a below grade busway station on the J Line of the Los Angeles Metro Busway system. The station is located on the shoulder of Interstate 110 at its intersection with Carson Street, after which the station is named, in Carson and West Carson, California.

It is one of two stations along the Harbor Freeway are outside of the Harbor Transitway, a shared busway and high occupancy toll lane. North of this station transitway services use Torrance Boulevard and Figueroa Street to the Harbor Gateway Transit Center. Traveling south on I-110 the next station is Pacific Coast Highway.

The station uses two side platforms which are accessed from Carson Street via stairs and elevators. The station is close to the Harbor–UCLA Medical Center and has a 143 space park and ride lot.

== Service ==
=== Hours and frequency ===
On this section of the J Line, buses run between 6 a.m. and 8 p.m. every day, and operate every 30 minutes.

=== Connections ===
As of December 15, 2024, the following connections are available:

- Long Beach Transit: 4
- Los Angeles Metro Bus: 205
- Torrance Transit: 1, 3, Rapid 3
