= Harbor Transitway =

Roadway in Interstate Highway 110 in Los Angeles County, California

- I-110 Express Lanes
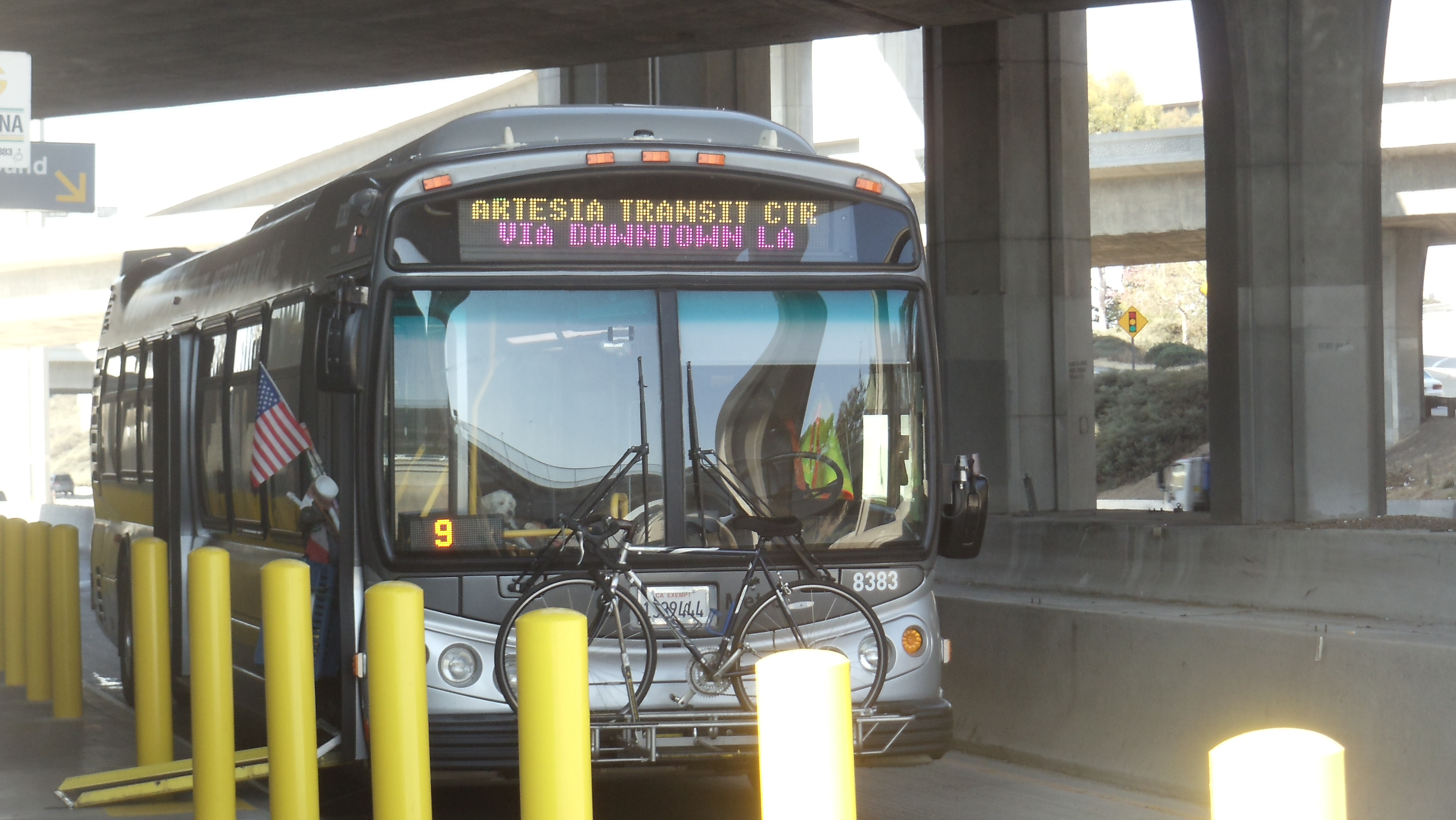
- Metro J Line runs on the Harbor Transitway with frequent service.

Overview
- System: Metro Busway & Metro ExpressLanes
- Operator: Los Angeles Metro
- Began service: June 26, 1996; 30 years ago

Routes
- Routes: J Line: 910, 950; Los Angeles Metro Bus: Express 460, Express 550; Dodger Stadium Express; GTrans: 1X; LADOT Commuter Express: 438, 439, 448; Torrance Transit: 4X
- Locale: Los Angeles County, California
- Length: 10.3 mi (16.6 km)

The Harbor Transitway (also known as the I-110 Express Lanes) is a 10.3-mile (16.6 km) shared-use express bus corridor (known as a busway or transitway) and high occupancy toll (HOT) lanes running in the median of Interstate 110 (Harbor Freeway) between Downtown Los Angeles and the Harbor Gateway Transit Center in Gardena, California. Buses also make intermediate stops at 37th Street/USC, Slauson, Manchester, Harbor Freeway, and Rosecrans stations. The facility opened for two-person carpools (high-occupancy vehicle lanes) on June 26, 1996, for buses on August 1, 1996 and was converted to HOT lanes as part of the Metro ExpressLanes project on November 10, 2012.

The Harbor Transitway is utilized by the J Line, a bus rapid transit route operated by Los Angeles Metro. It is also used by Los Angeles Metro Bus, Dodger Stadium Express, GTrans, LADOT Commuter Express and Torrance Transit bus services, most of which only run during weekday peak periods.

South of the Harbor Transitway, the Harbor Freeway also has two stations on the shoulder of the highway, Carson station and Pacific Coast Highway station which opened on November 18, 2000.

== History ==
=== Construction ===
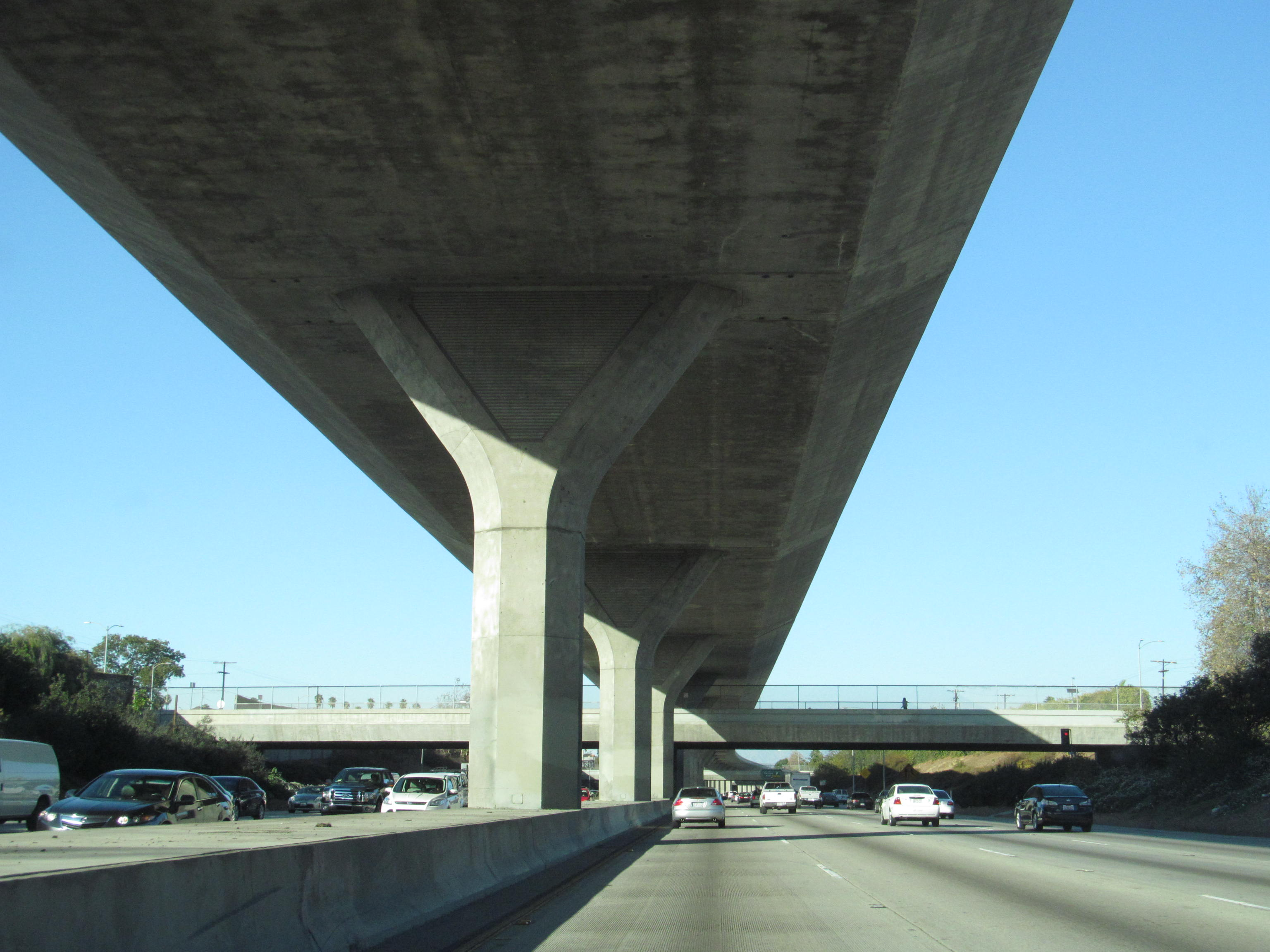
2.6 miles of the Harbor Transitway runs on viaducts elevated above regular traffic on the Harbor Freeway.

The Harbor Transitway project built 10.3 miles (16.6 km) of new lanes (two in each direction) for buses and two-person carpools (high-occupancy vehicle (HOV) lanes) between Downtown Los Angeles and a new transit center in Gardena, California. The most visually striking part of the project were the 2.6 miles of viaducts that elevated the transitway directly above the regular freeway traffic. The project also included new stations in the median of the transitway at 37th Street/USC, Slauson, Manchester, Harbor Freeway, and Rosecrans along with the Harbor Gateway Transit Center (then called the Artesia Transit Center) located southeast of the Harbor Freeway/State Route 91 interchange and connected by a flyover ramp.

South of State Route 91 to San Pedro, a 9.3-mile (15.0 km) section of the Harbor Freeway was widened from six to eight lanes. On this section of freeway, buses travel in the general-purpose lanes and make stops at new stations on the shoulder at Carson Street and Pacific Coast Highway. The project also built the off-highway Harbor Beacon Park & Ride in San Pedro, originally intended to be a transit center for the city.

The project to widen the Harbor Freeway and build the Harbor Transitway was planned and constructed concurrently with the new Interstate 105 (Century Freeway), which was highly controversial and Caltrans was required by a consent decree to include HOV lanes and a transitway, which became the C Line.

After about 20 years of planning and construction, the Harbor Transitway opened on June 26, 1996, at a cost of $498 million. Because of uncertainty on the opening date, buses would not start using the facility a few weeks later on August 1, 1996. Opening of the final one-mile elevated section from 39th Street to Adams Boulevard (including 37th Street/USC station) was delayed until July 28, 1997. The Harbor Freeway shoulder stations would open on November 18, 2000.

=== Early operations ===
Even before opening, Los Angeles Metro staff recognized that there was an opportunity to link the operation of the Harbor Transitway to the El Monte Busway, an older but operationally similar facility east of Downtown Los Angeles.

During the planning stages, Metro proposed to Caltrans that the transitway be extended from its terminal at 37th Street north for a more direct connection with Downtown Los Angeles or El Monte Busway. That request was not implemented, but Caltrans did construct the transitway with stub end to create a provision for a future extension. In 1998, Metro studied the extension but found it expensive and technically challenging, and to date there have been no further efforts to extend the transitway.

In 1993, Metro studied how to operate its buses on the Harbor Transitway best and settled on three proposals: continue to run service as it had before, shift to a hub-and-spoke system with a trunk route on the Harbor Transitway, or create a "dual hub" system with a trunk route that served both the Harbor Transitway and the older El Monte Busway. The study took into account that because the Harbor Transitway was a Caltrans project, no additional operating funds were provided to transit agencies in the region to operate over the new facility. Metro staff recommended the dual hub proposal, saying that it would be the most efficient and cost less to run. Ultimately, the Metro Board of Directors decided to largely continue running bus routes as they had before. Because most of the buses traveling on the Harbor Freeway served commuters' needs, service was frequent along the corridors during the weekday peak hours but infrequent during other times.

Ridership on the Harbor Transitway was radically lower than expected: Caltrans had projected that 65,200 passengers would travel along the Harbor Transitway each day, but after 10 years ridership fell far below those predictions, with the route seeing just 3,000 passengers per weekday in 2004. That amount is low compared to the El Monte Busway, which had 32,000 boardings a day in November 2000.

=== Conversion to bus rapid transit and high occupancy toll ===
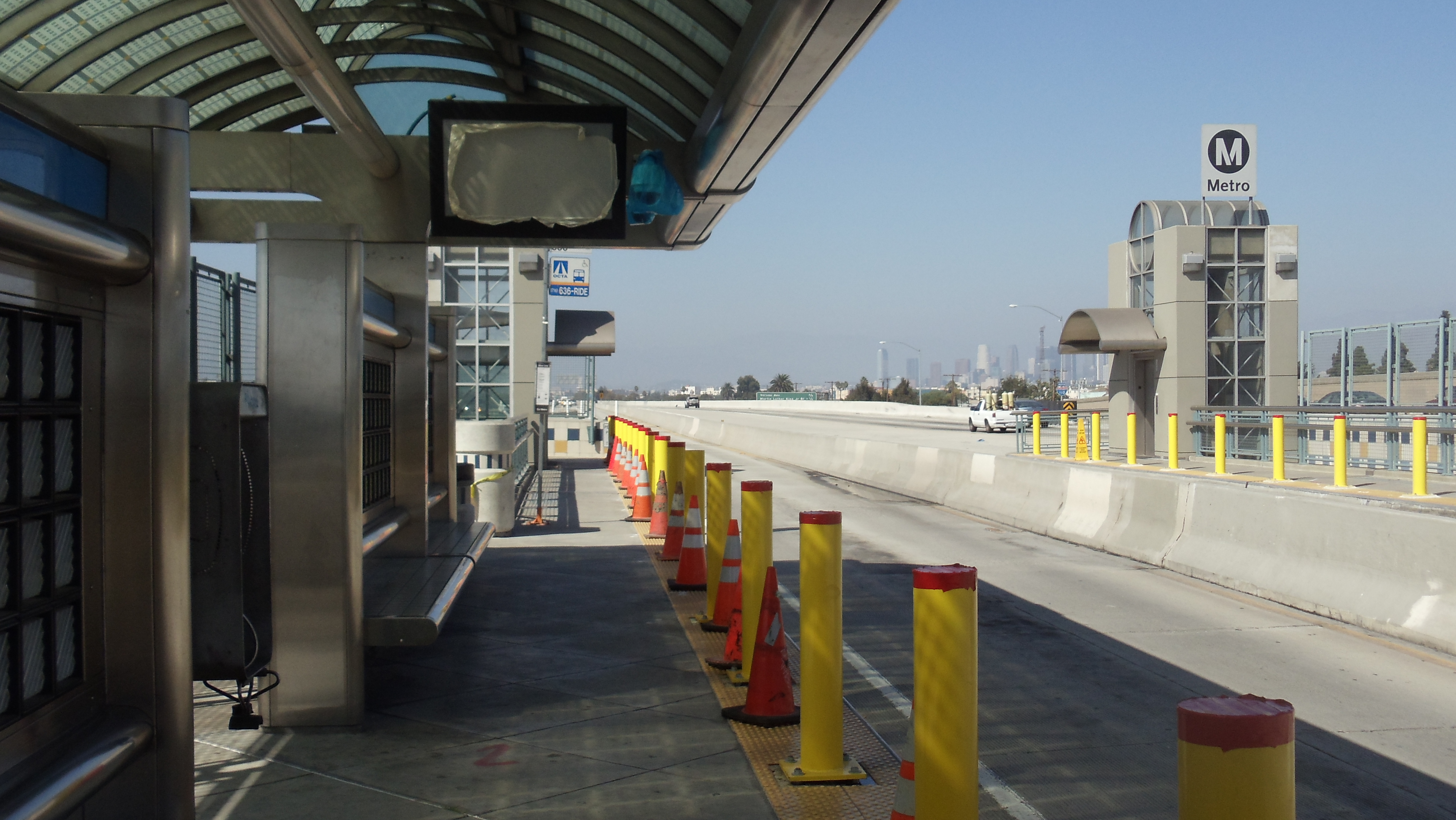
New bollards, security cameras, and digital message signs were added to stations after the start of bus rapid transit as seen here at Slauson station in September 2012.

After the successful launch of the Orange Line, a new busway in the San Fernando Valley, Metro decided to rebrand the county's other busways in an attempt to increase awareness. In March 2006, Metro decided that the Harbor Transitway would be colored bronze and the El Monte Busway would be colored silver on Metro's maps and the two would be marketed as a "Combined Transitway Service." No changes were made in the operations of the buses routes operated on the lines. The changes were criticized as being difficult to understand for irregular and new riders.

Metro returned to its plan for a dual-hub route in 2009, proposing a new bus rapid transit service called the Silver Line (now J Line) utilizing both the Harbor Transitway and the El Monte Busway. The new higher frequency service would be funded by converting both corridors into high occupancy toll (HOT) lanes, to be branded as the Metro ExpressLanes. The Silver Line began operations on December 13, 2009, with Metro planning to refurbish the aging stations along both corridors over the coming years. The electronic toll collection equipment for the HOT lanes on the Harbor Transitway went into service on November 10, 2012. The El Monte Busway's HOT lanes opened on February 22, 2013.

Stations along the Harbor Transitway were improved between early 2011 and late 2012 with the addition of real-time arrival signs, new wayfinding signage, improved lighting, and soundproofing. The Harbor Gateway Transit Center also received bathrooms and a law enforcement substation.

Usage of the Harbor Transitway has significantly increased with the implementation of the J Line, with ridership across the entire route reaching 19,277 boardings a day in February 2020.

TAP card ticket vending machines were added to most stations (except Carson and Pacific Coast Highway) in early 2017 to support all-door boarding on the J Line. Pre-payment of fares and all-door boarding reduces the time buses need to remain stopped at stations.

== Tolls ==
As of January 2026, the high-occupancy toll (HOT) lanes are a 24/7 service. Solo drivers are tolled using a congestion pricing system based on the real-time levels of traffic. Carpools with two or more people and motorcycles are not charged. All tolls are collected using an open road tolling system, and therefore there are no toll booths to receive cash. Each vehicle using the HOT lanes is required to carry a FasTrak Flex transponder with its switch set to indicate the number of the vehicle's occupants (1, 2, or 3+). Solo drivers may also use the FasTrak standard tag without the switch. Drivers without any FasTrak tag will be assessed a toll violation regardless of whether they qualified for free.

The difference between the Harbor Transitway and the El Monte Busway is that the latter charges two-person carpools the posted toll during peak hours.

== Bus services ==
The Metro J Line bus rapid transit line runs on the Harbor Transitway from Harbor Gateway Transit Center to Downtown Los Angeles and continues to El Monte station. The line operates daily with frequent service. In addition to Metro J Line, other Metro bus and municipal bus routes also operate on the Harbor Transitway. They include Los Angeles Metro Bus express lines 460 and 550, the Dodger Stadium Express, the city of Gardena's GTrans line 1X, LADOT Commuter Express routes 438, 439 and 448, along with Torrance Transit route 4X. Metro line 550 operates only during weekdays peak hours. Torrance Transit line 4, and Gardena Transit line 1X operate only during weekday peak hours. Metro Express line 460 operates daily along with the Metro Silver Line. Busway bus lines originate from Downtown Los Angeles and El Monte, with final destinations in Disneyland, and Disney California Adventure Park located in Anaheim, Knott's Berry Farm, Artesia, Fullerton, Gardena, Hawthorne, San Pedro and Torrance.

FlyAway buses use the transitway to travel between the Los Angeles International Airport and Union Station but do not serve any of the stations.

== Stations ==
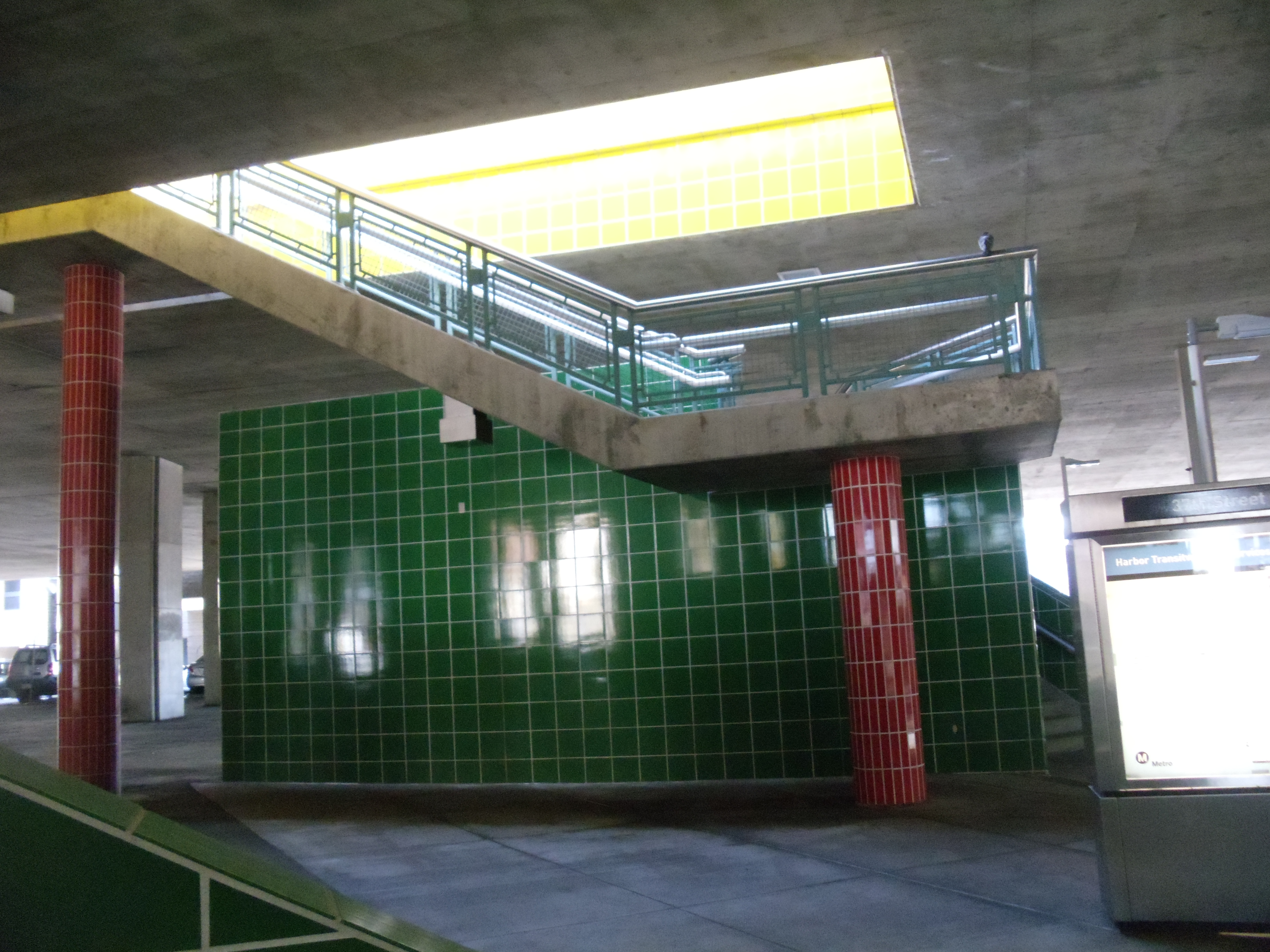
37th Street/USC station, stairs from lower level to northbound platform

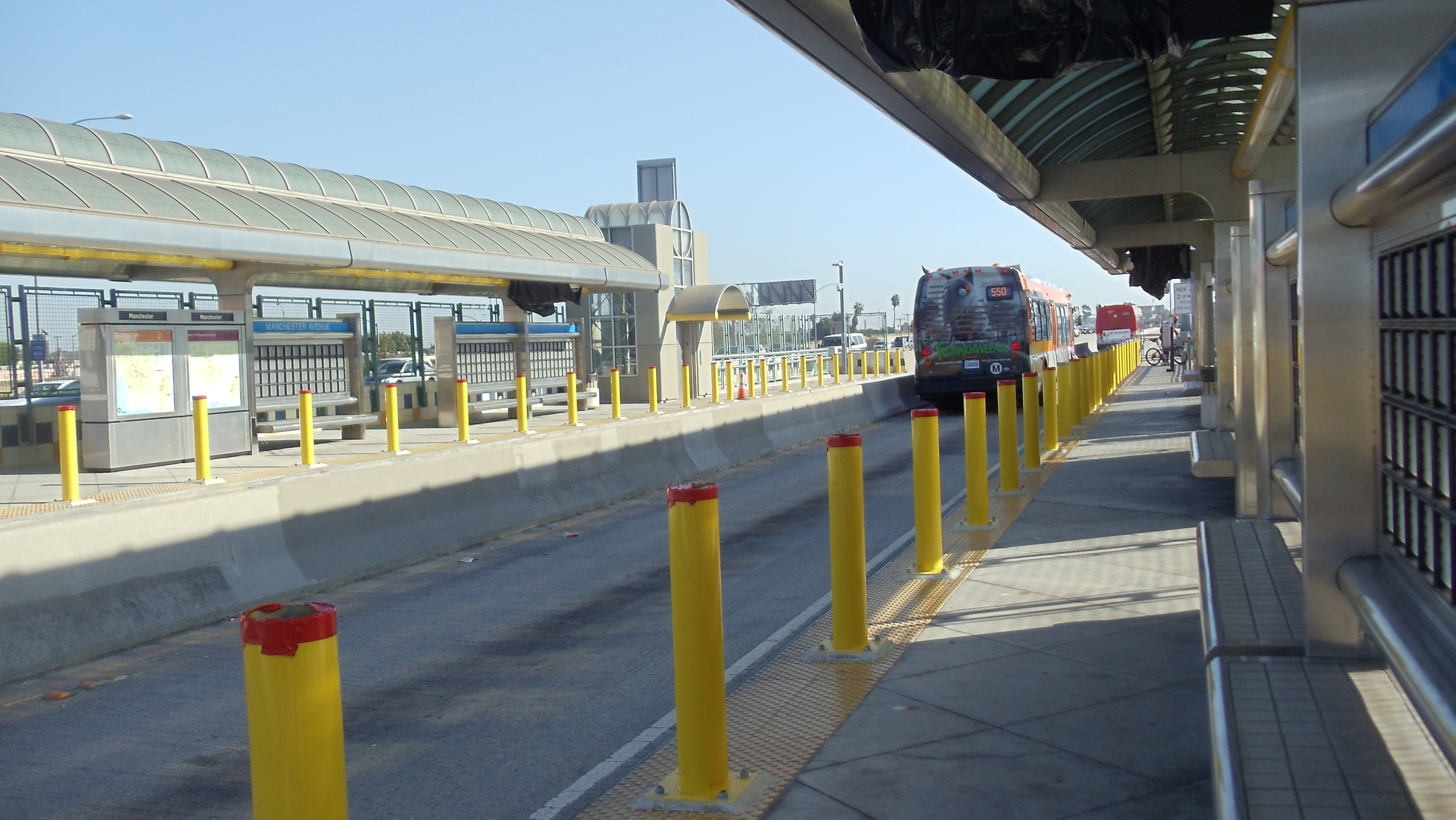
Metro Express routes 460 & 550 departing Manchester station

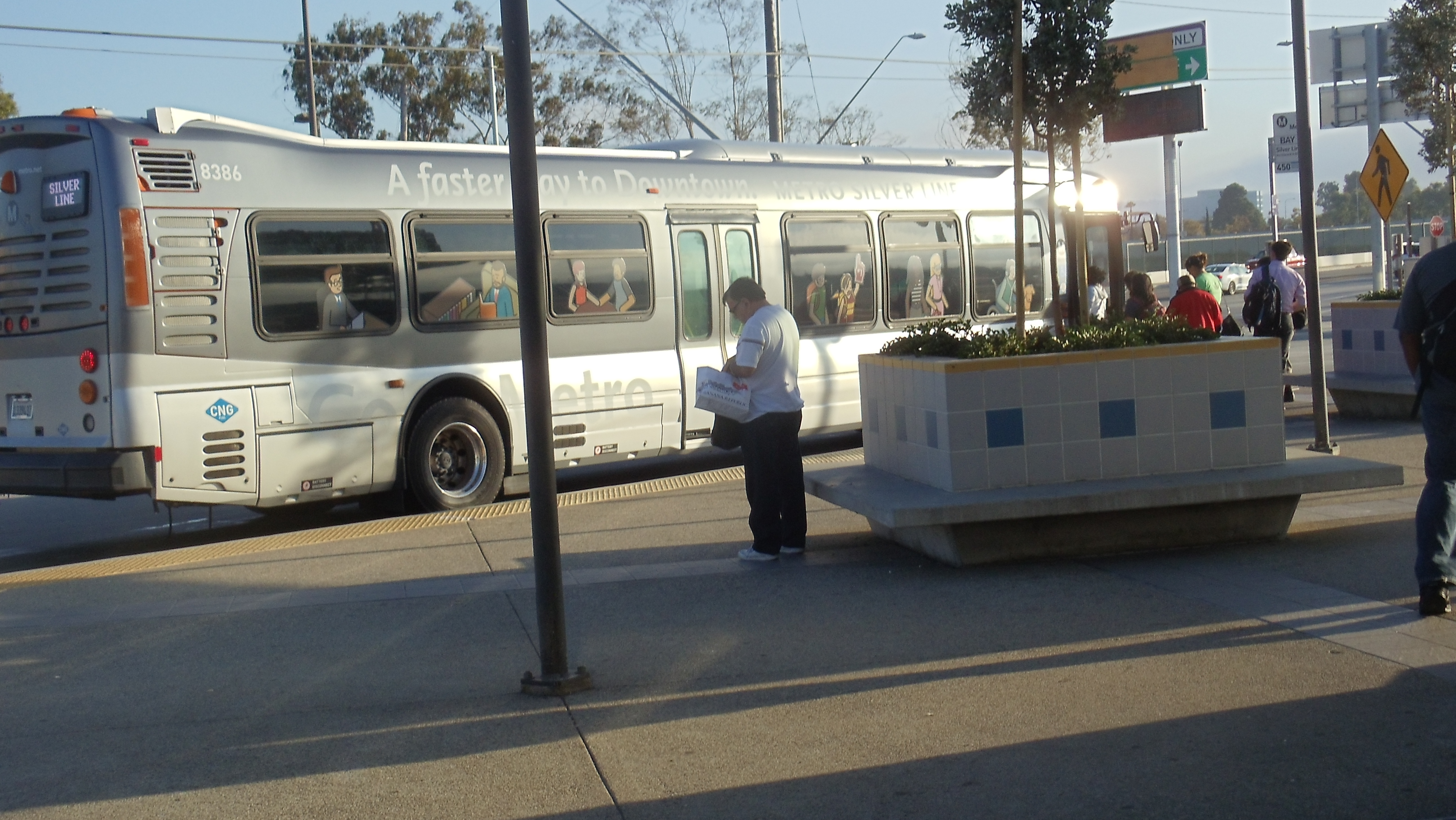
Passengers boarding the Metro J Line to Downtown Los Angeles & El Monte Station at Harbor Gateway Transit Center.

The Harbor Transitway has eight stations. From north to south, they are:

Station	Busway Services	Station Type	Date opened	City (Neighborhood)	Major connections and notes
37th Street/USC	J Line: 910, 950; Los Angeles Metro Bus: Express 460; LADOT Commuter Express: 438, 439, 448; Torrance Transit: 4X	Transitway median	August 1, 1996	Los Angeles (Exposition Park)	at Expo Park/USC
Slauson	J Line: 910, 950; Los Angeles Metro Bus: Express 460, Express 550; Dodger Stadium Express; Torrance Transit: 4X	Transitway median	August 1, 1996	Los Angeles (South Los Angeles)	Park and ride: 151 stalls
Manchester	J Line: 910, 950; Los Angeles Metro Bus: Express 460, Express 550; Dodger Stadium Express; Torrance Transit: 4X	Transitway median	August 1, 1996	Los Angeles (South Los Angeles)	Park and ride: 247 stalls
Harbor Freeway	J Line: 910, 950; Los Angeles Metro Bus: Express 550; Dodger Stadium Express; GTrans (Gardena): 1X; LADOT Commuter Express: 448; Torrance Transit: 4X	Transitway median	August 1, 1996	Los Angeles (South Los Angeles)	Park and ride: 253 spaces
Rosecrans	J Line: 910, 950; Los Angeles Metro Bus: Express 550; Dodger Stadium Express; Torrance Transit: 4X	Transitway median	August 1, 1996	Los Angeles (Harbor Gateway)	Park and ride: 338 stalls
Harbor Gateway Transit Center	J Line: 910, 950; Los Angeles Metro Bus: Express 550; Dodger Stadium Express; GTrans: 1X; Torrance Transit: 4X	Off-freeway transit center	August 1, 1996	Los Angeles (Harbor Gateway)	Park and ride: 980 stalls
Carson	J Line: 950	Freeway shoulder	November 17, 2000	Carson	Park and ride: 140 stalls
Pacific Coast Highway	J Line: 950	Freeway shoulder	November 17, 2000	Carson	Park and ride: 240 stalls

== Incidents ==
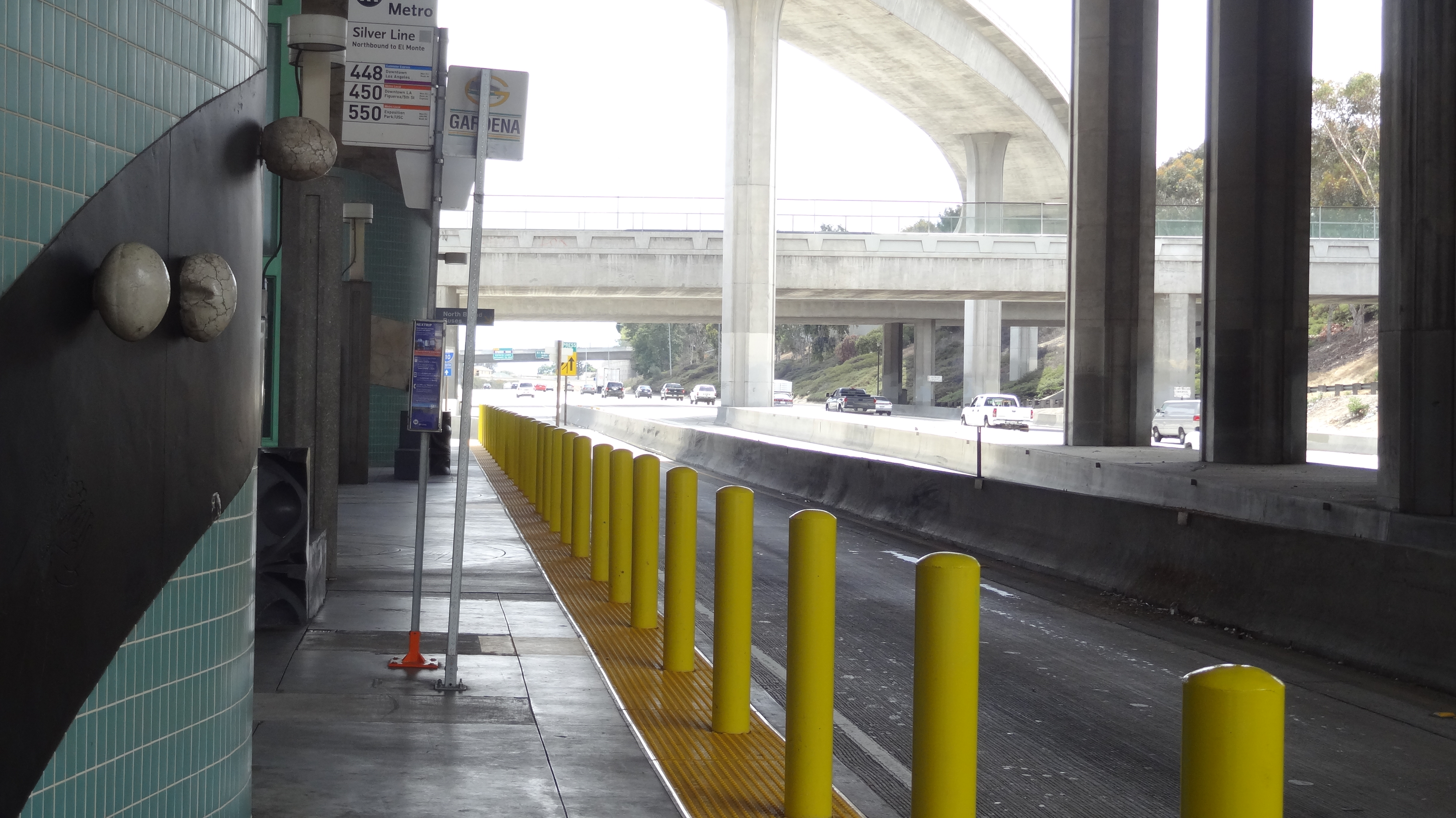
Bollards were installed at Harbor Freeway station and all similar stations after the crash.

On February 22, 2012, a drunk driver on the Harbor Freeway mistakenly entered the bus-only platform area of the Harbor Freeway station. The driver, 51-year-old Stephen Lubin of Sun Valley, was traveling 80 miles per hour (130 km/h), 15 mph (24 km/h) over the freeway's posted speed limit, in his 2009 Honda Fit as he entered the station and encountered a bus stopped at the platform. Lubin swerved to avoid hitting the bus and drove onto the platform where he hit seven people, critically injuring six, before slamming into a pole.

After the crash, Metro's CEO Art Leahy asked Metro's safety committee staff to review the layout of busway stations and safety signage on the roadways leading into the station areas. As a result of that investigation, Metro added concrete-filled metal bollards to all stations on the Harbor Transitway and the El Monte Busway to prevent vehicles from entering the platform and additional markings were added on roadways leading into stations.
