= Harbor Gateway, Los Angeles =

Harbor Gateway Shoestring
- Neighborhood of Los Angeles
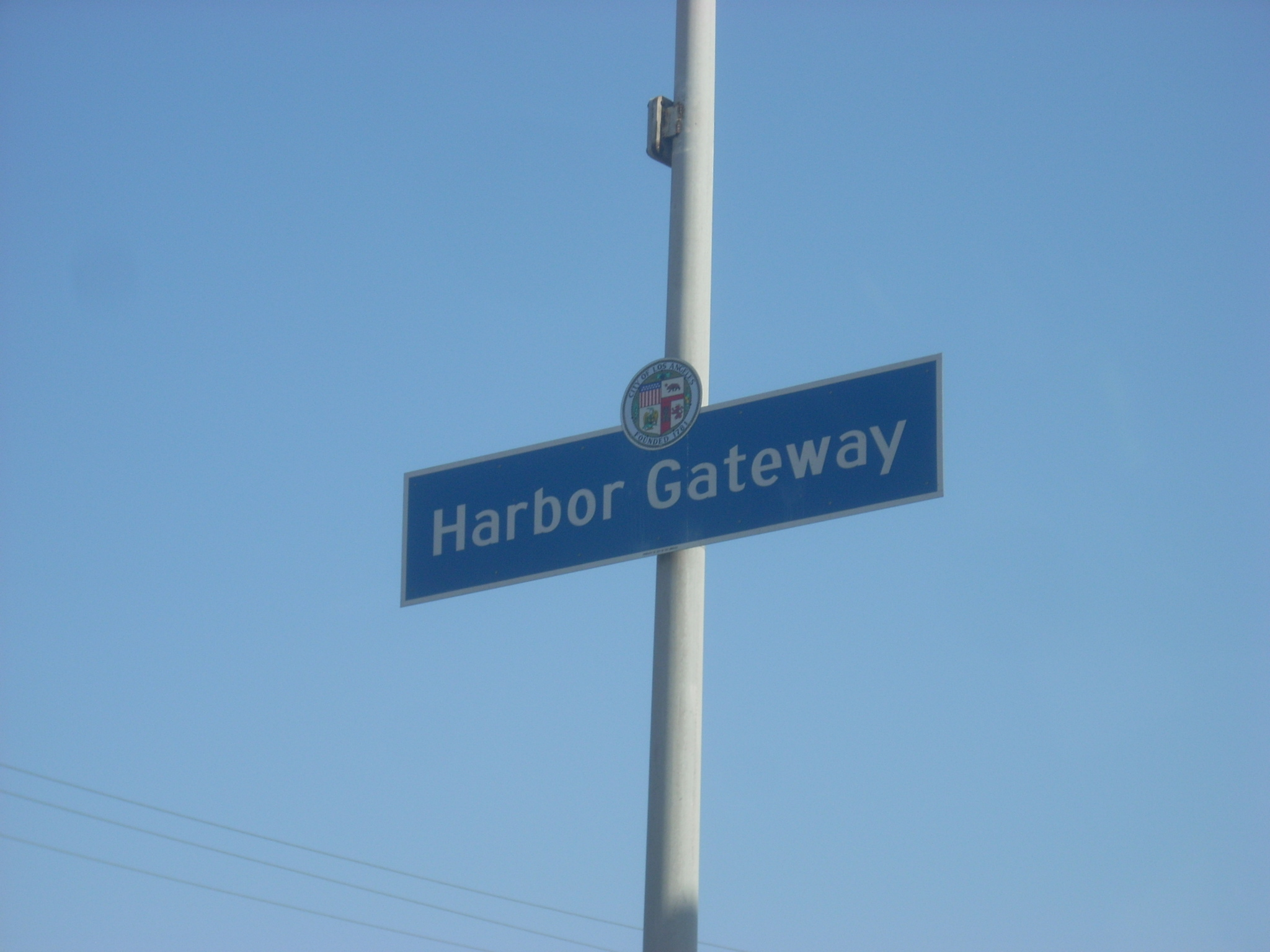
- Harbor Gateway neighborhood sign

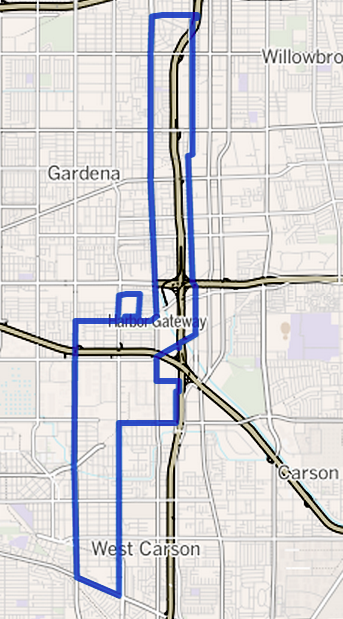
- Harbor Gateway as outlined by the Los Angeles Times

- Los Angeles County with the City of Los Angeles in red. The Harbor Gateway is a two-mile wide north-south corridor that connects the Port of Los Angeles to the south with the rest of the city in the north (note the vertical red line).
- Coordinates: 33.850072°N 118.299068°W
- Country: United States
- State: California
- County: Los Angeles
- City: Los Angeles

The Harbor Gateway, sometimes informally known as the L.A. Strip due to its shape, is a 5.14-square-mile residential and industrial area (13.3 km^{2}) in the South Bay and Los Angeles Harbor Region, in the southern part of the City of Los Angeles. The neighborhood is narrow and long, running along a north-south axis.

The Shoestring Annexation, as it was called at the time, was attached to Los Angeles in 1906 to serve as a link to the Pacific Ocean port cities of Wilmington and San Pedro, both of which were later annexed into Los Angeles themselves in 1909. The Shoestring was officially renamed to the Harbor Gateway in 1985.

== Geography ==
Harbor Gateway is a narrow north-south corridor situated approximately between Vermont Avenue and Figueroa Street north of Interstate 405, and Western and Normandie avenues south of I-405. The territory was acquired by the city of Los Angeles in a shoestring annexation, specifically to connect San Pedro, Wilmington, Harbor City and the Port of Los Angeles with the rest of the city.

Harbor Gateway abuts Broadway-Manchester on the north and is flanked by Rosewood, Carson and West Carson to the east, West Carson and Harbor City to the south and Athens and Gardena to the west and Torrance to the south and west.

The neighborhood's street boundaries are 120th Street on the north and Vermont Avenue and Figueroa Street on the west and east respectively, running south to 182nd Street, where the neighborhood takes a jog to the west and draws its western boundary at Western Avenue, its eastern line at Normandie Avenue and its southern border at West Sepulveda Boulevard. A southeastern section bounded by 192nd Street on the north, Hamilton Avenue on the east, Del Amo Boulevard on the south and railroad tracks on the west includes the Holiday Inn Harbor Gateway.

Another section between 177th and 182nd Streets includes Gardena High School.

North of I-405 and Artesia Boulevard is North Harbor Gateway, which lies between Vermont Avenue and Figeroa Street, a one-block strip that is bisected by the Harbor Freeway/I-110. South of I-405 the strip follows a different one-block strip between Western Avenue and Normandie Avenue, with the southern end of the neighborhood being Sepulveda Avenue, this southern section is defined as South Harbor Gateway. Connecting the two strips is a one-block east-west strip between West 182nd and West 190th Streets. The independent cities of Torrance, and Gardena lie immediately west of the strip, while the unincorportated community of West Rancho Dominguez and the independent city of Carson lie to its east.

== History ==
=== Annexation ===
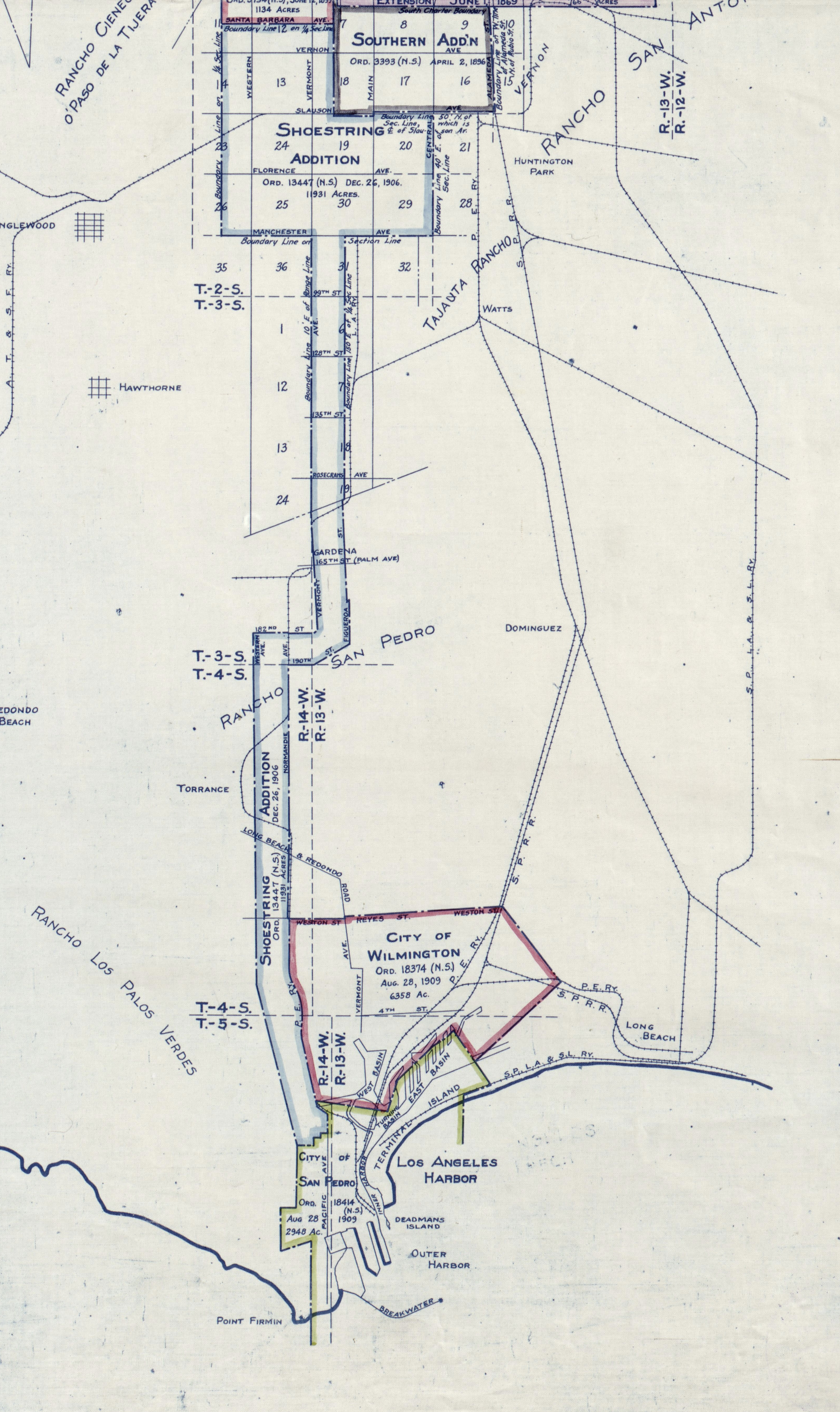
Map of the Los Angeles Harbor Region indicating the three major annexations: Shoestring Annexation (1906) San Pedro Annexation (1909) Wilmington Annexation (1909)

The city of Los Angeles annexed the area on December 26, 1906 "in anticipation of taking over, several years later, the independent cities of Wilmington and San Pedro" in order to create the Port of Los Angeles. Because of its slim shape, once likened to two shoelaces tied together with a granny knot, the neighborhood—only a half mile wide at some points—was known for years as the "city strip," the "shoestring strip" or simply "the strip."

The strip was simply open fields before World War II, but "Then came factories, attracting workers who needed housing," and builders "filled those fields with small houses and duplexes." Cubans settled in the 1960s and Mexican immigrants in the 1970s. From 1985 to 1992, some seventy-five single-family homes were replaced by nearly five hundred apartment units, and the neighborhood gained some 1,500 residents, with "no plan, no thought," as the area's leading developer put it.

=== 1980s ===
In 1985, the Los Angeles City Council renamed the area as Harbor Gateway. But a Los Angeles Times reporter noted four years later that

Harbor Gateway lacks much of what makes a community a community—no central business district, no civic center or gathering place, no library branch, no police station ... no post office. Its largest park is a cemetery. And, despite the new name, mailing addresses of residents remain unchanged. They still say Torrance or Gardena, not Los Angeles.

In 1985, Harbor Gateway was referred to as a "crime-plagued area," and residents blamed the widespread availability of alcohol for "dozens of robberies, burglaries and other crimes" in the blue-collar neighborhood. There were at that time 51 liquor outlets within a two-mile radius of the intersection of El Segundo Boulevard and Vermont Avenue.

In 1989, however, Harbor Gateway was tied with the Westwood neighborhood as Los Angeles's second-fastest-growing area, Sylmar being first. However, the contrast between the unkempt Los Angeles side of Gardena Boulevard and the tidy Gardena side was striking. In March 1988, the United Way of Los Angeles declared Harbor Gateway an "under-served geographic area," noting "real gaps in law enforcement" and in social services. At the same time, there became a "major drawing card for commercial development" along the 190th Street corridor where "Gleaming high-rises with pleasant landscaping have replaced a Shell oil refinery and manufacturing plants."

=== 1990s ===
In 1991, parts of the Gateway were known to be "the turf of warring black and Latino gangs, and Gardena High School students of those two ethnicities "clashed after a multicultural program in the school auditorium." In December 2006 the Los Angeles Times reported that racial tensions "have held this working-class neighborhood in a state of fear for years" and that the Latino 204th Street Gang, "noted for preying on" blacks had warned all blacks to stay south of 206th Street. The neighborhood averaged "about one Latino-on-black homicide" each year since 1997, the Los Angeles Police Department reported.

By 1992, the United Way had "funneled $100,000 to the few private charities serving the area, including a small free medical clinic, a job center and an ad hoc coalition helping the homeless." It was written that "extended families crowd into single apartments, and the homeless sleep under freeway overpasses."

In 1997, police, the county Human Relations Commission and neighbors organized to fight the gang and the blight. The city added bulletproof streetlight covers. Residents repaired holes in fences -- escape routes for gang members. Girl Scouts, accompanied by officers, picked up trash and painted over graffiti. More than 100 gang members -- black and Latino -- were sent to jail for parole or probation violations. Police patrols increased. Violence fell. But the campaign dissipated, and gang members slowly returned. By 1999, the Latino-on-black violence resumed.

=== 2000s ===
In December 2006, a 14-year-old black girl, Cheryl Green, was shot and killed while talking with friends on Harvard Boulevard just south of the 206th Street dividing line. Jonathan Fajardo, 18, was sentenced to death for killing Green and for stabbing a "potential witness" to death. Another culprit, Ernesto Alvarez, was sentenced to a range of 238 years to life in state prison for the acting as a lookout in Cheryl's death.

A Latino gang, the 204th Street Gang, came into existence, but as the African-American population rose from 313 in 1990 to 835 in 2000, a black gang also formed—the 208th Street Crips. "The Crip gang's willingness to go to the police with complaints offended the Latino gang's sense of honor," wrote reporter Sam Quinones for the Los Angeles Times. Yet the gang was never "rooted in the neighborhood," and by 2001 it had faded away. There has been animosity between blacks and Latinos, and in 2007, a gang injunction has been enforced against Latino gangs.

In 2008, another gang injunction put many Latino gang members in jail, and by 2009, racial tensions had "definitely calmed," and a new community center was opened at 1435 Del Amo Boulevard in the city of Torrance and named in honor of Cheryl Green. "Cheryl's death was the tipping point for L.A.," said Los Angeles Councilwoman Janice Hahn, yet gang graffiti still abounded in the neighborhood and blacks were fearful of Latino animosity.

=== 2010s ===
In 2013, it was noted that one section of Harbor Gateway had "one of the city's highest concentrations of registered sex offenders," with 86 living in a 13-block area, and so the city began a campaign to force some of them to move by building pocket parks in Harbor Gateway and in Wilmington. In California, such offenders are barred by law from living near schools and parks. The small park was built on city-owned land on the southeast corner of Torrance Boulevard and Denker Avenue.

== Demographics ==
=== 1992 ===
In 1992, it was noted that the poorest part of the area was between Rosecrans Avenue and Artesia Boulevard.

=== 2000 ===
A total of 39,688 people lived in Harbor Gateway's 5.14 square miles, according to the 2000 U.S. census—averaging 7,720 people per square mile, about the same population density for the city as a whole.

=== 2008 ===
Population was estimated at 42,005 in 2008. The median age was 27, young for the city of Los Angeles. The percentage of married women (56.2%) was among the county's highest.

Harbor Gateway is considered highly diverse ethnically, with a diversity index of 0.648 In 2000 Latinos made up 53.4% of the population, blacks were at 16.3%, Asians at 16%, whites at 11.8% and others at 2.4%. Mexico and the Philippines were the most common places of birth for the 40.8% of the residents who were born abroad, considered an average percentage of foreign-born when compared with the city as a whole.

The $47,849 median household income in 2008 dollars was average for the city. Renters occupied 59.7% of the housing units, and homeowners occupied the rest.

== Government and infrastructure ==
The Los Angeles County Department of Health Services operates the Torrance Health Center in Harbor Gateway, near Torrance.

The National Transportation Safety Board operates the Gardena Aviation Field Office in Harbor Gateway; it is the regional headquarters of the NTSB Aviation Western Region.

The area is served by two neighborhood councils—Harbor Gateway North and Harbor Gateway South, with the division between the two at Artesia Boulevard.

== Economy ==
Many trucking, shipping and logistics companies are based in Harbor Gateway. The headquarters of National Stores (Fallas Paredes) is in Harbor Gateway, near Gardena. Yoshinoya America's headquarters are in Harbor Gateway, near Torrance. Faraday Future is headquartered is located in Harbor Gateway, near Carson, CA, even though it has a Gardena address.

Roosevelt Memorial Park is a cemetery between Vermont and Normandie north of 184th Street.

== Education ==
Just 12.4% of Harbor Gateway's residents aged 25 or older had completed a four-year degree by 2000, an average figure when compared with the city at large. The percentage of residents of that age without a high school diploma was high for the county.

=== Schools ===
It is in the Los Angeles Unified School District.

The schools within Harbor Gateway's boundaries are:

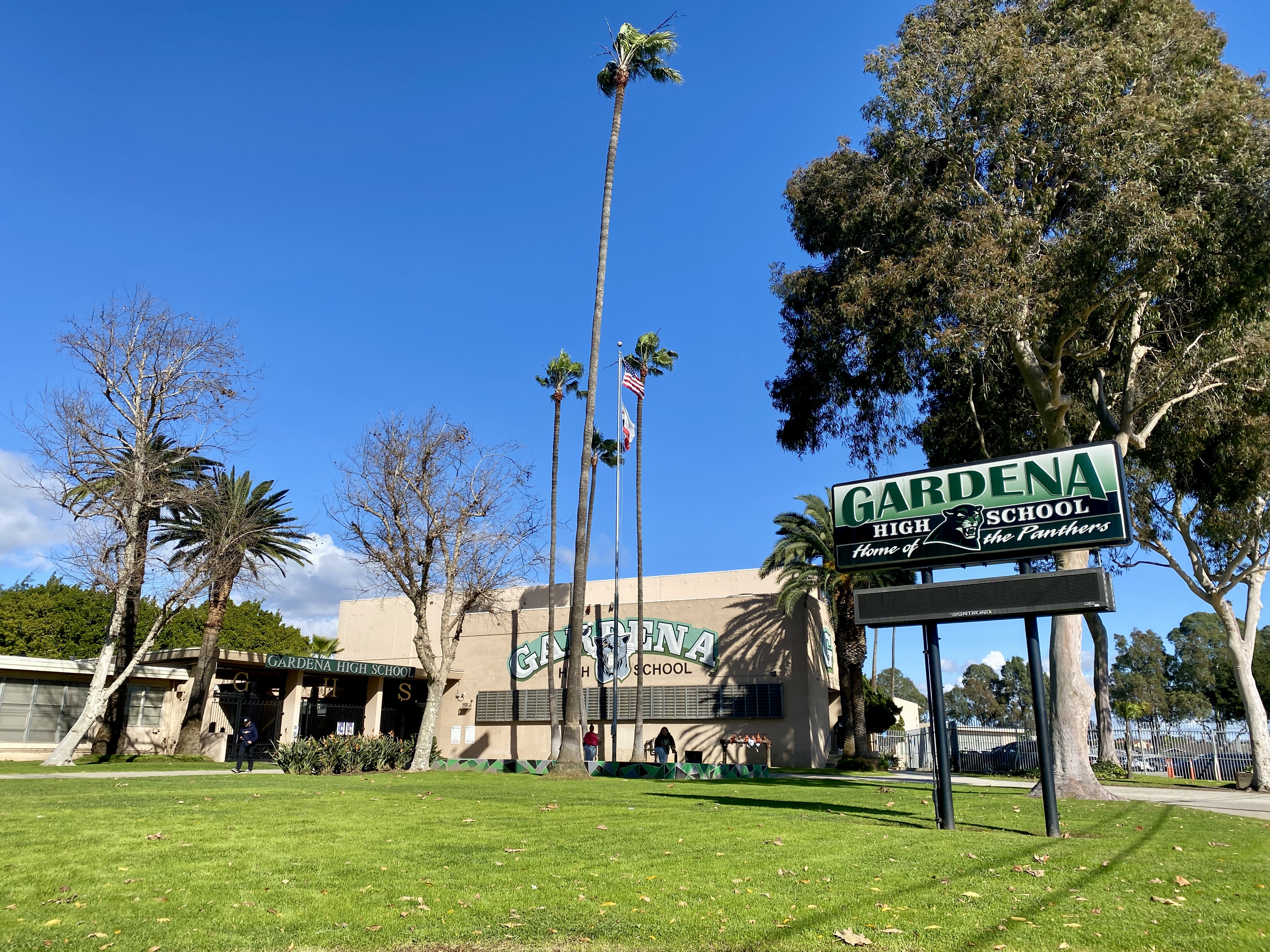
Gardena High School

- Gardena High School, LAUSD,1301 West 182nd Street
- Moneta Continuation School, LAUSD, 1230 West 177th Street
- Magnolia Science Academy Santa Clara, LAUSD charter (no address given)
- One Hundred Thirty-Fifth Street Elementary School, LAUSD, 801 West 135th Street
- Gardena Elementary School, LAUSD, 647 West Gardena Boulevard
- Gardena Valley Christian School, private, 1473 West 182nd Street
- One Hundred Eighty-Sixth Street Elementary School, LAUSD, 1581 West 186th Street. In 2011, the school was one of only three in the Los Angeles Unified School District where bus transportation was provided "solely because of safety concerns." Otherwise, Harbor Gateway pupils would "have to cross railroad tracks and major freeway onramps and offramps" to get to their school. The community, it was said, was also home to "dozens of paroled sex offenders."
- Halldale Elementary School, LAUSD, 21514 Halldale Avenue
- Environmental Charter Middle School, 812 West 165th Place

The northern end of the Gardena HS campus has LAUSD staff housing, Sage Park Apartments.

Asahi Gakuen, a part-time Japanese school, has its administrative offices in Harbor Gateway.

=== Libraries ===
Los Angeles Public Library operates the Harbor Gateway-Harbor City Branch.

== Recreation and parks ==
The Rosecrans Recreation Center/CVS Playground is in Harbor Gateway, on Vermont Avenue south of 149th Street. The playground was developed by the nonprofit Boundless Playgrounds.

== Public transportation ==
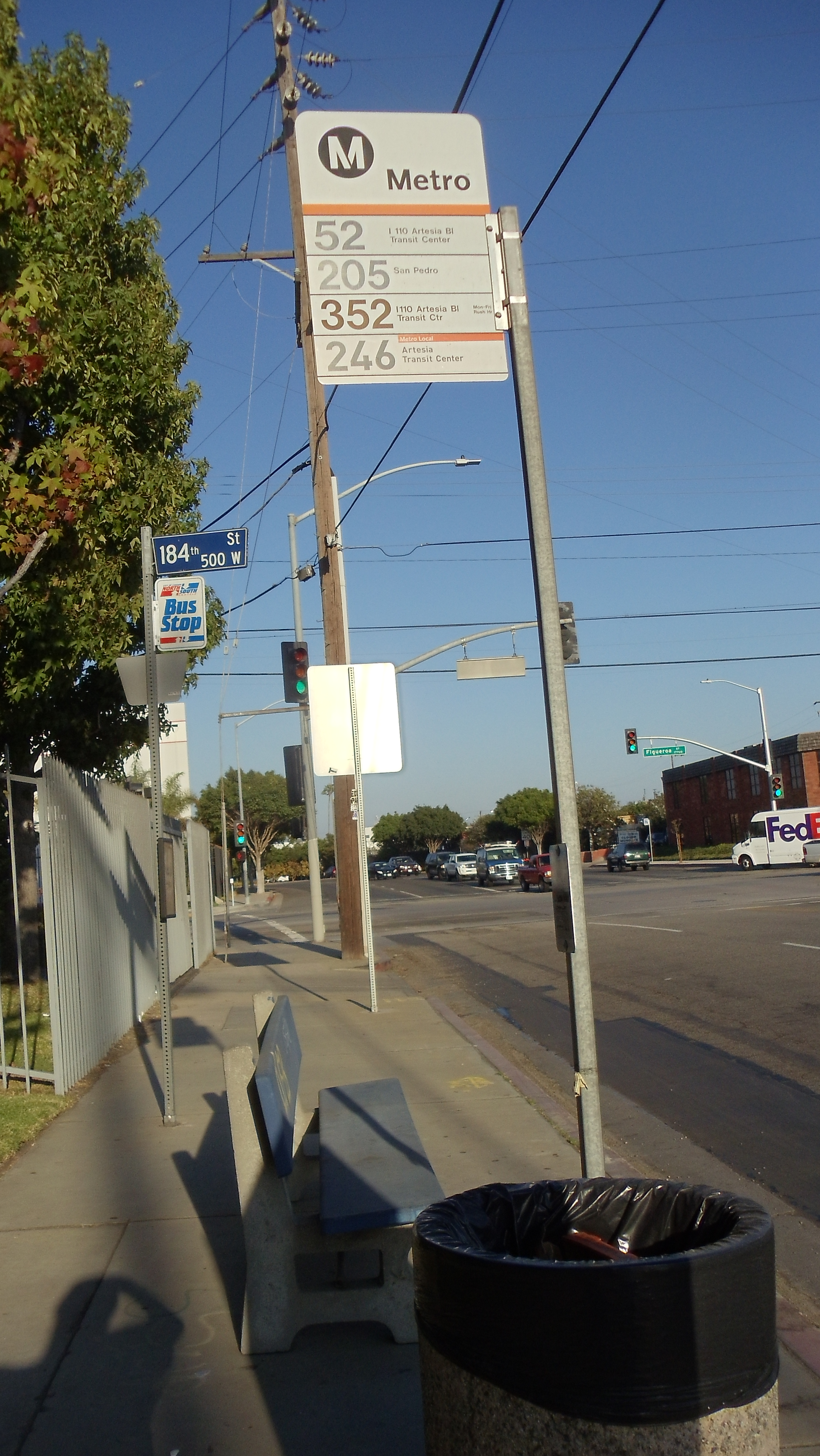
Metro Local bus stop near Harbor Gateway Transit Center, 2012

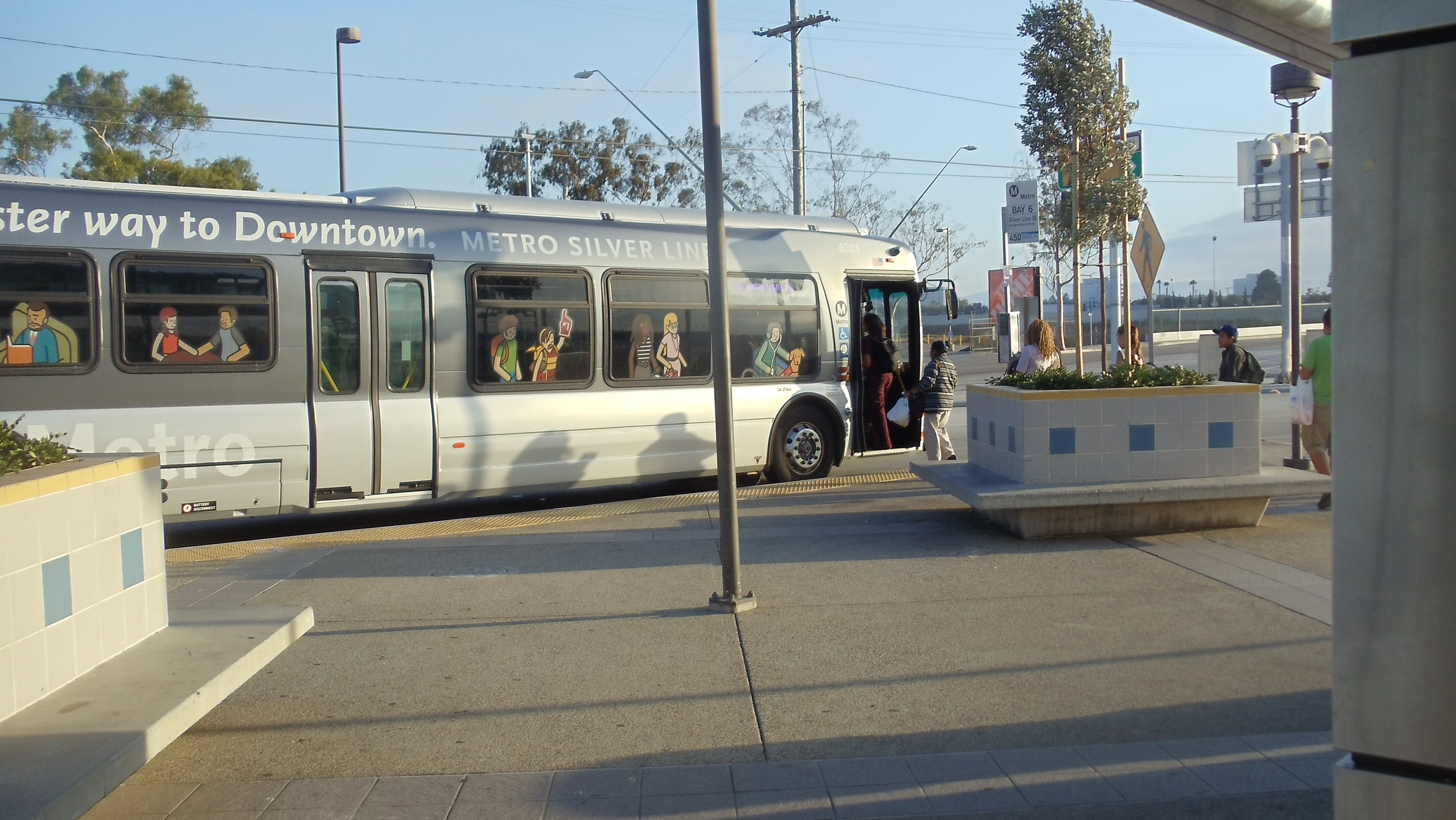
Metro Silver Line at the Harbor Gateway Transit Center, 2012

The Harbor Gateway Transit Center is an immense transportation hub for various bus lines. The Metro J Line bus rapid transit line runs between El Monte station, Downtown Los Angeles, and the Harbor Gateway Transit Center and selects trips to San Pedro, which is the line's southern terminus. The Metro Silver Line operates on the Harbor Transitway (I-110 freeway) between Downtown Los Angeles, the Harbor Gateway Transit Center and San Pedro. The Harbor Gateway Transit Center is located at 731 West 182nd Street, Gardena, CA 90248. Nine Metro bus lines (including the Metro Silver Line) operate from the transit center to various destinations. In addition, Torrance Transit lines 1, 4X, 6, and 13 serve the transit center, while Gardena Transit lines 2, 4 (school days only), and 7X (NFL game days only) also serve at the transit center.

== See also ==
- List of districts and neighborhoods of Los Angeles
