= Harbor Gateway Transit Center =

Bus station in Los Angeles, California

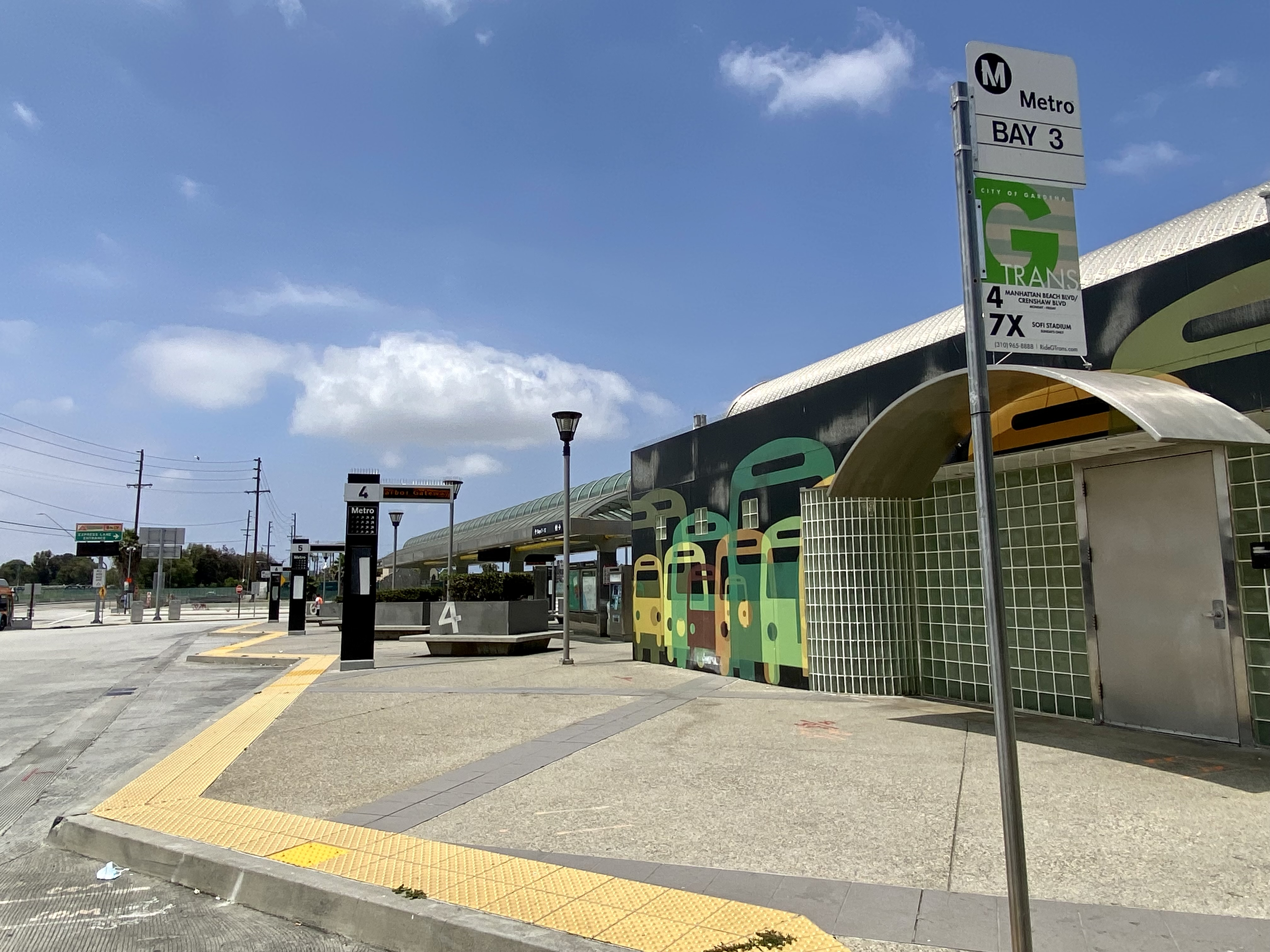
- Harbor Gateway Transit Center platform

General information
- Location: 731 West 182nd Street; Gardena, California
- Coordinates: 33°52′11″N 118°17′16″W
- Operator: Los Angeles Metro
- Line: See Services section
- Platforms: 1 island platform
- Bus stands: 12

Construction
- Structure type: At-grade
- Parking: 980 spaces
- Cycle facilities: Lockers
- Accessible: Yes

History
- Former names: Artesia Transit Center

Passengers
- FY 2026: 1,621 (avg. wkdy boardings, J Line)

Services
Preceding station	Metro Busway	Following station
Terminus	J Line 910	Rosecrans toward El Monte
Carson (stops en route) toward San Pedro	J Line 950	Rosecrans toward El Monte
Location

The Harbor Gateway Transit Center, formerly the Artesia Transit Center, is a large bus station at the southern end of the Harbor Transitway that serves as a transport hub for the South Bay region of Los Angeles County including the Harbor Gateway neighborhood of Los Angeles and cities of Carson, Gardena, and Torrance. The station consists of one large island platform with 12 bus bays and a 980 space park and ride parking lot located in the southwest corner of Interstate 110 (Harbor Freeway) and California State Route 91 (Gardena Freeway).

The station is one of the stops on J Line, a bus rapid transit route which runs between El Monte, Downtown Los Angeles and San Pedro as part of the Metro Busway system. J Line buses serve the station twenty-four hours a day; the headway between buses is about four minutes during peak periods, with less frequent service at other times.

The Harbor Transitway also serves as a hub for Metro Local, Metro Express, GTrans, and Torrance Transit buses. Three game-day shuttle services also serve the station: the Dodger Stadium Express, the SoFi Stadium Shuttle (via GTrans) and Galaxy Express (to Dignity Health Sports Park).

The station, originally called the Artesia Transit Center, was built between 1989 and 1996 as part of the Harbor Transitway project and opened to passengers on August 1, 1996.

Five 450-kW DC fast chargers are to be installed at the station to support electrification of the J Line. These will use the overhead inverted pantograph style connector under SAE standard J3105.

== History ==
The transit center, originally named the Artesia Transit Center, was built as the southern terminus of the Harbor Transitway, a 10.3-mile (16.6 km) shared-use express bus corridor and high-occupancy vehicle lanes (later converted to high occupancy toll (HOT) lanes) running in the median of Interstate 110 (Harbor Freeway) north to Downtown Los Angeles.

After about 20 years of planning and construction, the Harbor Transitway was opened on June 26, 1996, at a cost of $498 million. Because of uncertainty on the opening date, buses would not start using the facility until a few weeks later on August 1, 1996. The project was built by Caltrans and the transit facilities would be operated by Los Angeles Metro after completion.

Caltrans envisioned that the transit center and transitway would offer a similar function to El Monte station located at the end of the El Monte Busway, an older but operationally similar facility east of Downtown Los Angeles, offering a large parking lot where commuters would park their cars and ride buses to downtown and serving as a hub in a hub-and-spoke system for the South Bay where riders can transfer between buses. In 1993, Metro staff recommended the creation of a "dual hub" system with a trunk route that served both the Harbor Transitway and the older El Monte Busway. Ultimately, the Metro Board of Directors decided to largely continue to running bus routes as they had before.

Ridership on the Harbor Transitway was radically lower than expected: Caltrans had projected that 65,200 passengers would travel along the Harbor Transitway each day, but after 10 years, ridership fell far below those predictions, with the route seeing just 3,000 passengers per weekday in 2004. That amount is low compared to the El Monte Busway, which had 32,000 boardings a day in November 2000.

On November 18, 2000, a 9.3-mile (15.0 km) section of the Harbor Freeway south of State Route 91 was widened, and new bus new stations were added on the shoulder, allowing some bus routes to be extended south to San Pedro.

Metro returned to its plan for a dual-hub route in 2009, proposing a new bus rapid transit service called the "Silver Line" (now called the J Line) utilizing both the Harbor Transitway and the El Monte Busway. The new higher frequency service would be funded by converting both corridors into high occupancy toll (HOT) lanes, to be branded as the Metro ExpressLanes. The Silver Line began operations on December 13, 2009, with Metro planning to refurbish the aging stations along both corridors over the coming years, including the Artesia Transit Center. As part of the change, several Metro routes would now terminate at the transit center.

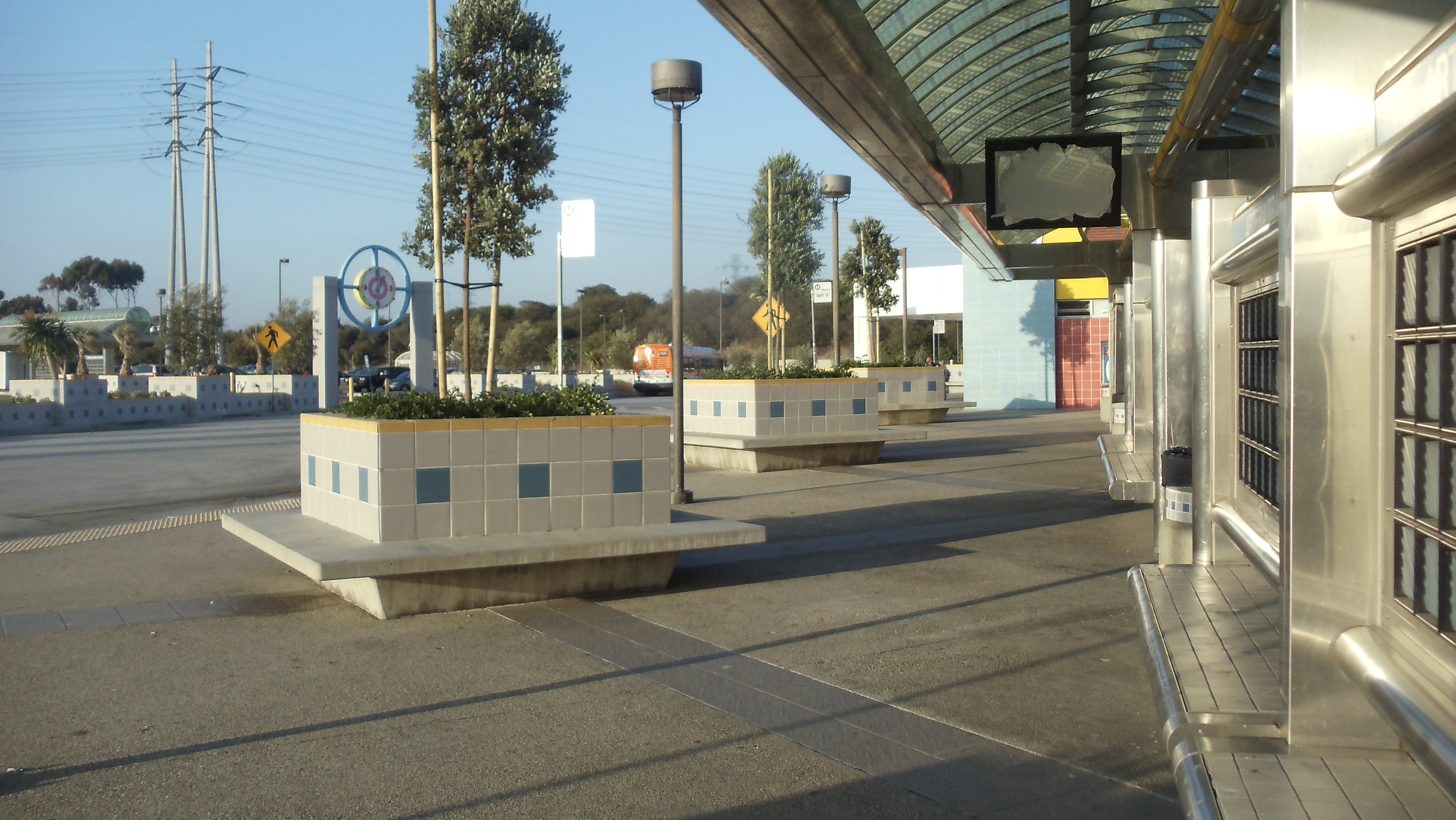
Platform as message signs were being installed

Improvements to the transit center started in December 2010 with the installation of bike lockers, adding improved lighting, and the repurposing of an existing building as a Sheriff's substation. In October 2011, the Metro board voted to rename the Artesia Transit Center to the Harbor Gateway Transit Center. Landscaping was improved in October 2012, a self-cleaning public toilet was opened in February 2013, and monitors with bus departure information were activated in March 2013. Signage improvements were installed in phases starting in 2013, adding new station name signs, decals on walls, wayfinding signs, new entry pylons, and an 80-foot monument pylon visible from the Harbor Freeway. A total of four TAP card ticket vending machines were added at the transit center by early 2017 to support all-door boarding on the J Line. Pre-payment of fares and all-door boarding reduces the time buses need to remain stopped at stations.

== Layout ==
The Harbor Gateway Transit Center consists of one large island platform with 12 bus bays and a 980 space park and ride parking lot located in the southwest corner of Interstate 110 (Harbor Freeway) and California State Route 91 (Gardena Freeway). The transit center is connected to the Harbor Transitway by a flyover ramp. The station is located near the Harbor Gateway neighborhood of Los Angeles and cities of Carson, Gardena, and Torrance.

The platform can be accessed by pedestrians from West 182nd Street. The parking lot can be accessed from West 182nd Street or Vermont Avenue near Artesia Boulevard.

The station also has a Sheriff's substation, a self-cleaning public toilet, and TAP card vending machines.

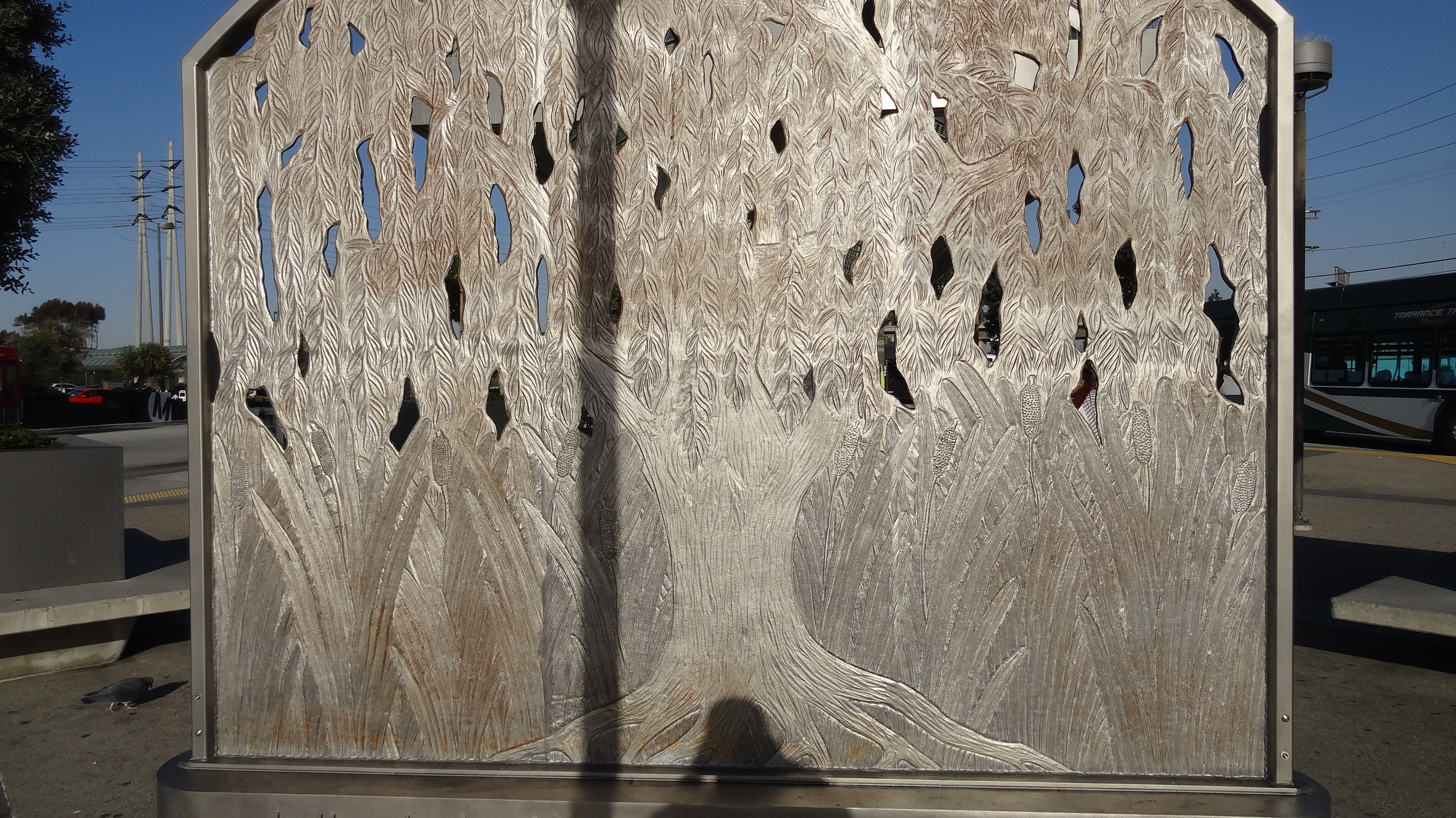
Paraje by Alison Saar at the Harbor Gateway Transit Center

The Harbor Gateway Transit Center also houses a free-standing art installation as part of the Los Angeles County Metropolitan Transportation Authority's art program that commissions artists to integrate artworks into its stations for the enjoyment of transit customers. Located on the west side of the platform, Alison Saar's Paraje is a 10-foot-high (3.0 m) by 10-foot-wide (3.0 m) cast stainless steel sculpture depicts a willow tree on the west side and on the east side a willow spirit emerges mysteriously from the tree. The artwork was installed on January 28, 2013. The name Paraje is Spanish for a resting place between two destinations and the artwork was inspired by the nearby Gardena Willows Wetland Preserve.

== Services ==
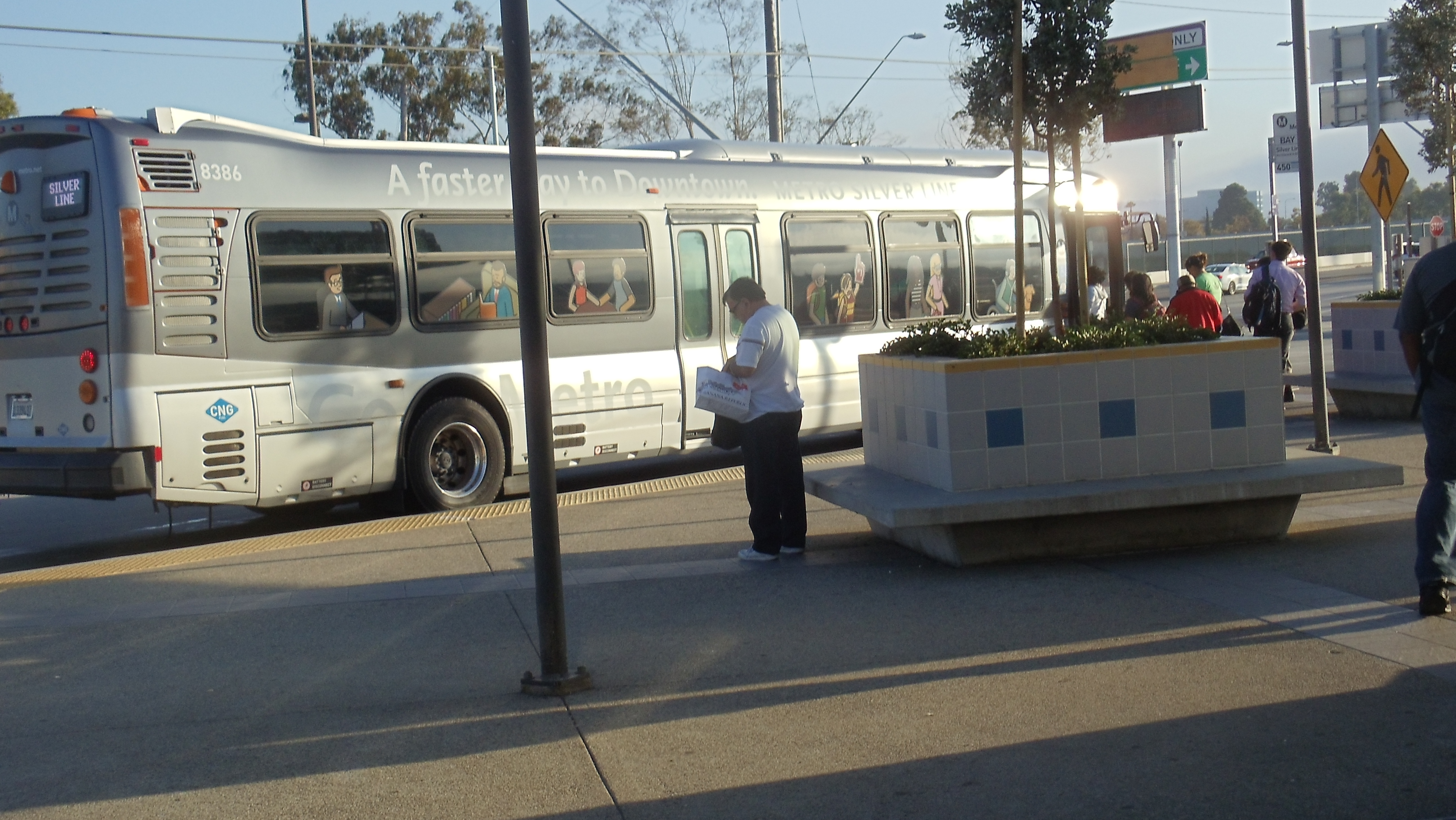
J Line (formerly Silver Line) bus boarding

The Harbor Gateway Transit Center is used by the Metro J Line bus rapid transit route which runs between El Monte station in El Monte, Downtown Los Angeles and the Harbor Gateway Transit Center, with select trips continuing onto San Pedro. The J Line is part of the Metro Busway system.

J Line buses run 24 hours a day between El Monte, Downtown Los Angeles, and the Harbor Gateway Transit Center, as route 910. Some trips continue to San Pedro between 6 a.m. and 8 p.m. and are signed as Route 950. On weekdays, buses operate every four to eight minutes during peak hours. They operate every 10 minutes in the midday, 20 minutes during evenings, 40 minutes during nights, and every hour overnight. On weekends, buses arrive every 15 minutes most of the day. They operate every 20 minutes during evenings, 40 minutes during nights, and every hour overnight.

The Harbor Gateway Transit Center is also served by several local bus routes:As of December 15, 2024, the following connections are available:

Services from the Harbor Gateway Transit Center
Operator	Route	Bay(s)	Destination
GTrans	2	11	Harbor City (southbound)
GTrans	2	12	Vermont/Athens station (northbound)
GTrans	4	3, 4	El Camino College (Weekday peak hours only)
GTrans	7X	3	SoFi Stadium (Sunday game days only)
GTrans	Bolt		Gardena
Long Beach Transit	Galaxy Express	1	Dignity Health Sports Park (Game days only)
Metro	Dodger Stadium Express	9	Dodger Stadium (Game days only)
Metro	205	2	Willowbrook (northbound)
Metro	205	11	San Pedro (southbound)
Metro	246	10	San Pedro
Metro	344	4	Rancho Palos Verdes
Metro	550	5	Expo Park/USC station
Metro	J Line (910)	6	El Monte station
Metro	J Line (950)	6	El Monte station (northbound)
Metro	J Line (950)	10	San Pedro (southbound)
Torrance Transit	1	5	Harbor Freeway station (northbound)
Torrance Transit	1	12	Del Amo Fashion Center (southbound)
Torrance Transit	4X	5	Downtown Los Angeles (northbound)
Torrance Transit	4X	12	Torrance (southbound)
Torrance Transit	6	2	Artesia station (eastbound)
Torrance Transit	6	11	Del Amo Fashion Center (westbound)
Torrance Transit	13	2	Artesia station (eastbound)
Torrance Transit	13	4	Redondo Beach Pier (westbound)
