= Los Angeles Metro Busway =

Bus rapid transit system in Los Angeles County, California

Metro Busway

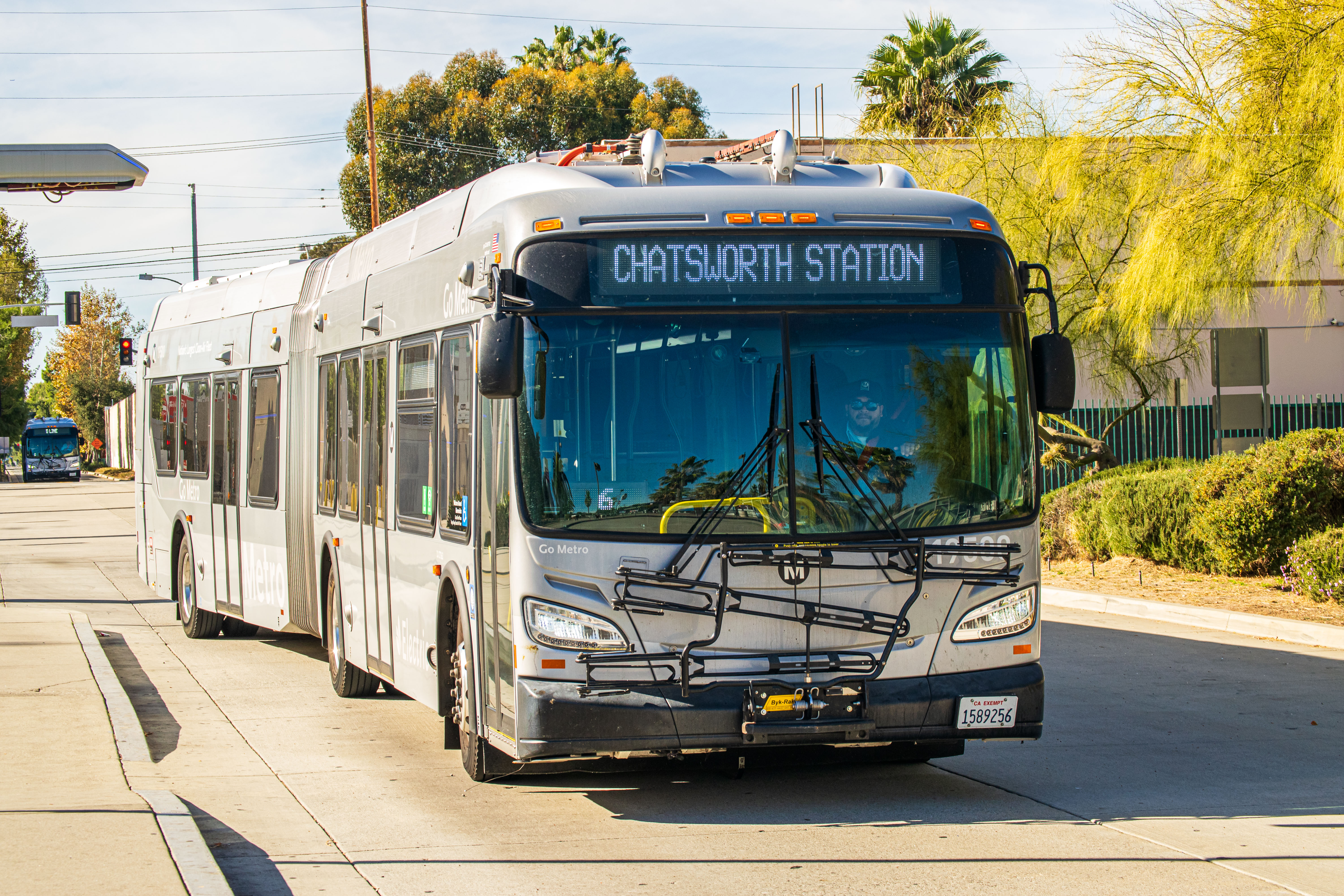
- G Line

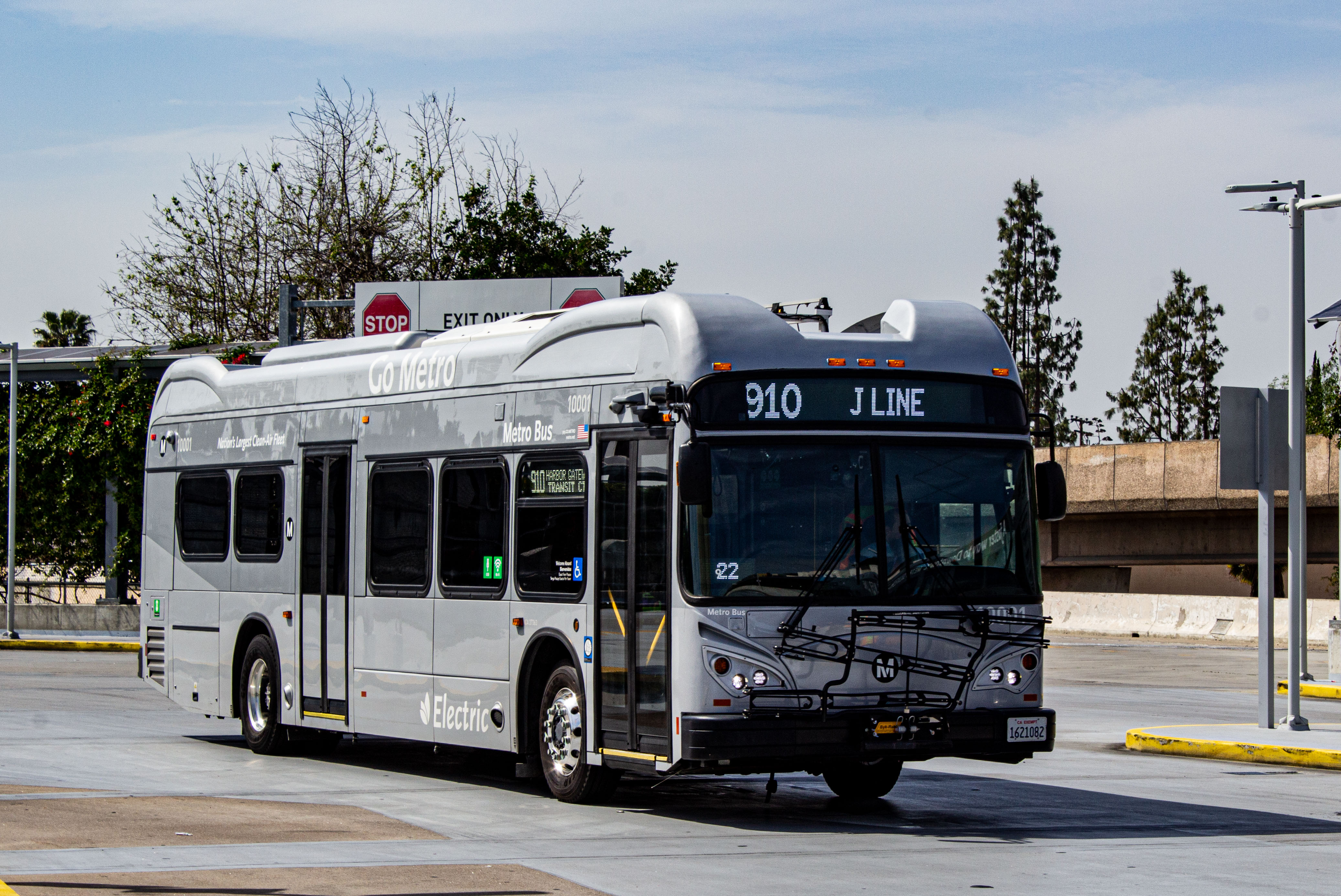
- J Line

Overview
- Locale: Los Angeles County, California
- Transit type: Bus rapid transit
- Number of lines: 2
- Number of stations: 29
- Website: metro.net

Operation
- Began operation: October 29, 2005 (G Line); December 13, 2009 (J Line)
- Operator: Los Angeles Metro

Technical
- System length: 55.7 mi (89.6 km)
System map
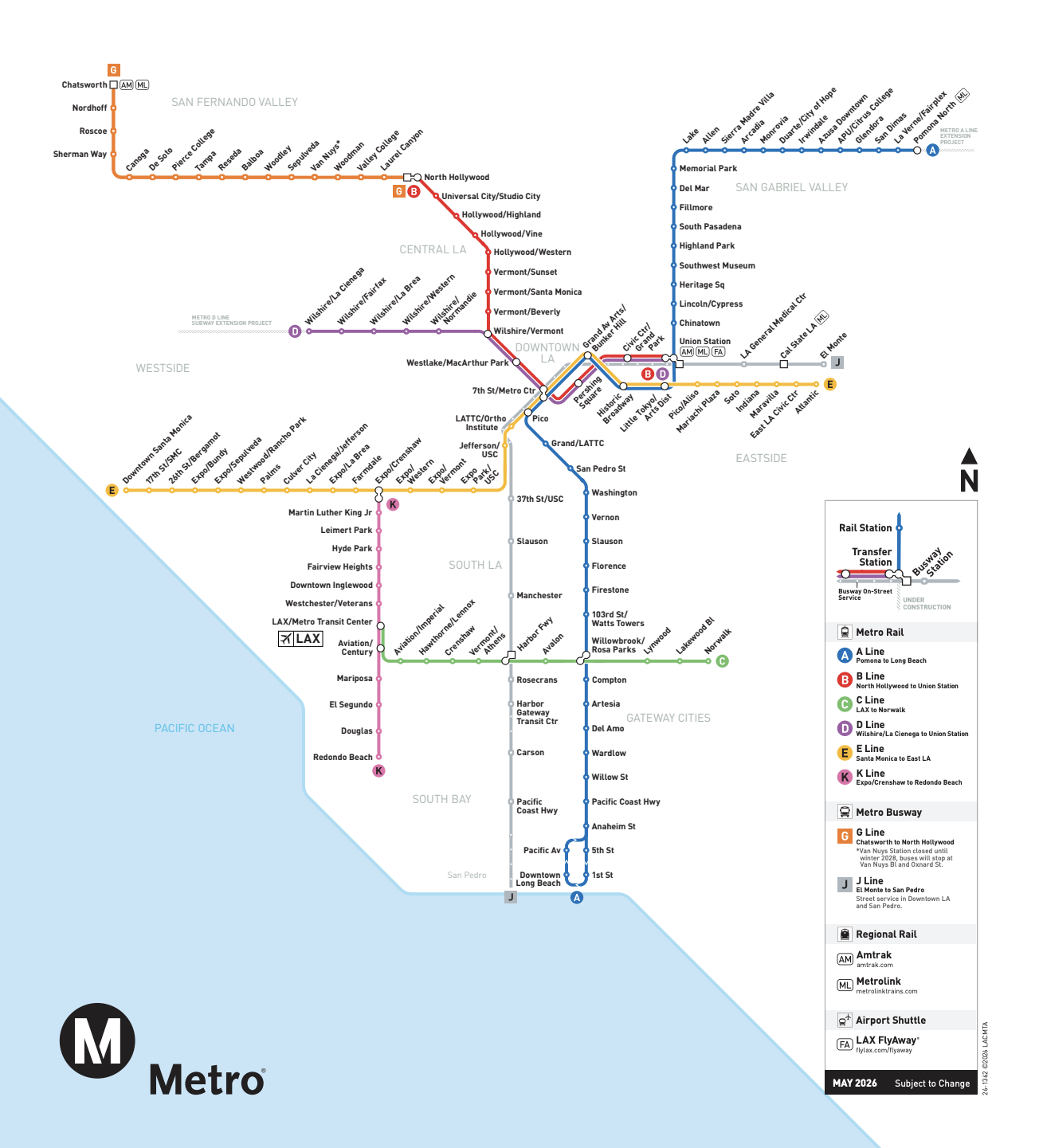

Metro Busway (formerly known as Metro Liner and Metro Transitway) is a system of bus rapid transit (BRT) routes operated by Los Angeles Metro. The system primarily uses exclusive or semi-exclusive roadways, referred to locally as a busway or transitway. It currently consists of two lines serving 29 stations, not including surface street stops: the G Line in the San Fernando Valley and the J Line, which serves El Monte, Downtown Los Angeles, Gardena, and San Pedro.

The G Line, which operates on an exclusive busway, was the first to open, beginning service on October 29, 2005. The J Line launched on December 13, 2009, utilizing the pre-existing Harbor Transitway and El Monte Busway, semi-exclusive corridors that are used by both buses and as high-occupancy toll lanes under the Metro ExpressLanes program.

Metro Busway services are designed to mimic Metro Rail services, in both the vehicles' design and their operation. Buses feature a silver livery similar to that used on Metro Rail vehicles, offer all-door boarding, and receive signal priority at intersections. Both lines operate on a proof-of-payment system; passengers with valid fare loaded on a TAP card may board through any door. TAP cards can be purchased and reloaded at ticket vending machines located at most stations.

== System ==
=== Lines ===
Metro Busway lines are named as part of the naming scheme used for Metro Rail lines, however, the colored icons for the Metro Busway lines are squares instead of the circles used for Metro Rail lines.

Two Metro Busway lines operate in Los Angeles County:

Line name	Opening	Length	Stations	Termini
G Line	2005	17.7 mi (28.5 km)	17	Chatsworth (west); North Hollywood (east)
J Line	2009 (Note: While the roadways the J Line operates on opened as the El Monte Busway in 1973 and as the Harbor Transitway in 1996, the J Line was not established as a through route until 2009 (when it was referred to as the Silver Line).)	38 mi (61 km)	12	El Monte (north); Harbor Gateway Transit Center (south); San Pedro (south)

=== Corridors ===
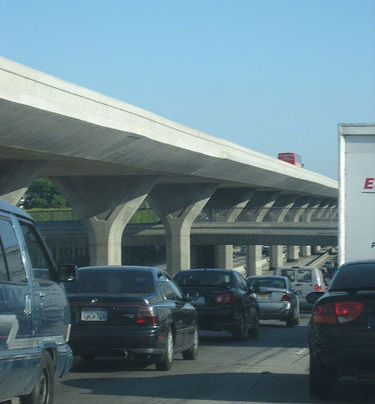
The elevated viaduct of the Harbor Transitway that the Metro J Line operates on.

These services operate on three primary corridors (in addition to city streets, where necessary):

- G Line Busway
- El Monte Busway
- Harbor Transitway/Harbor Freeway

== History ==
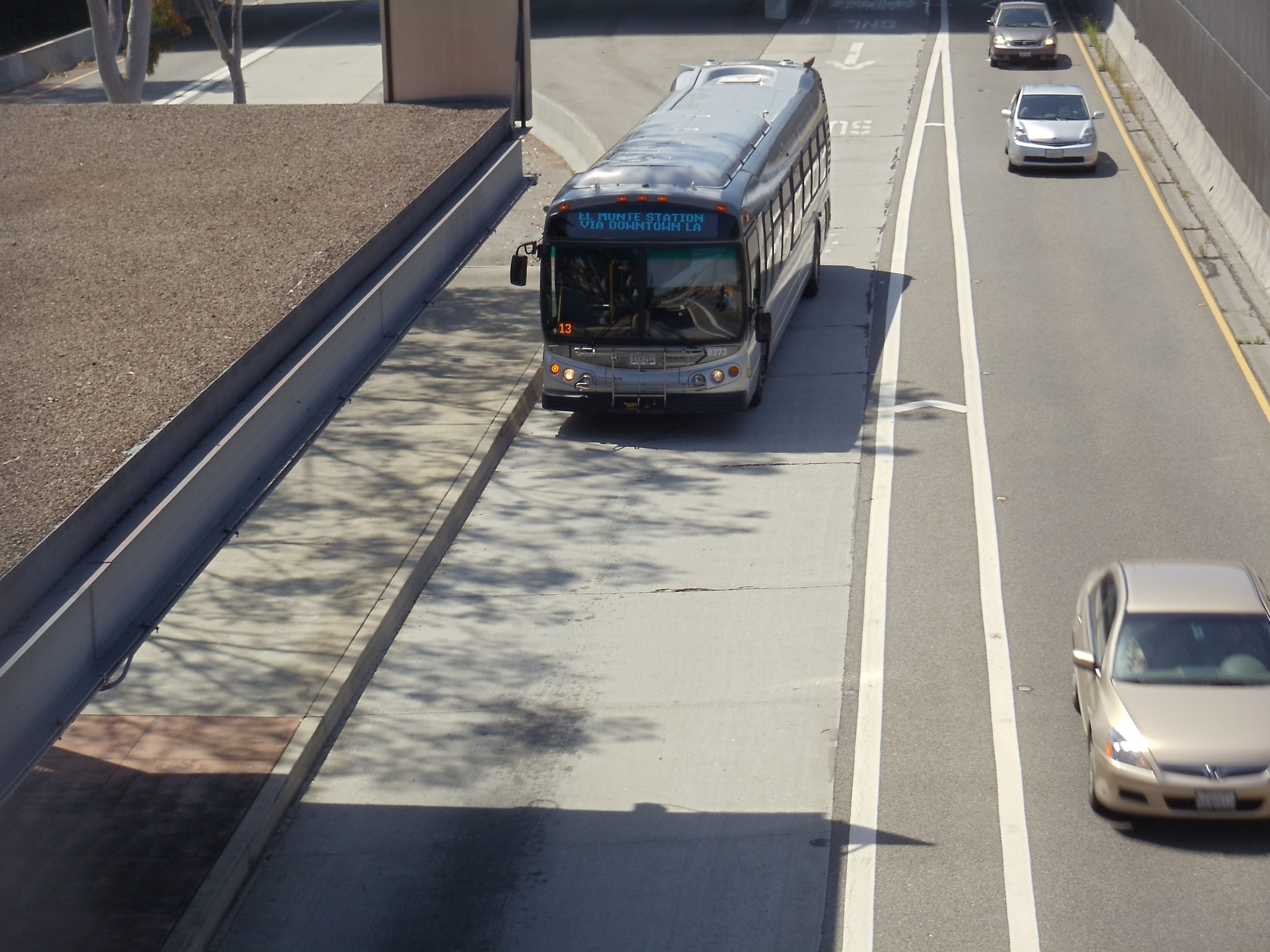
Metro J Line bus arriving at Los Angeles General Medical Center station on the El Monte Busway

The first busway in the Los Angeles area was the El Monte Busway, which opened in January 1973. The El Monte Busway, which runs parallel to the San Bernardino Freeway, offered an 18-minute trip between El Monte and Downtown Los Angeles, compared to 35–45 minutes in the general-purpose lanes. The facility was a success with about 32,000 boardings per day on lines that used the busway as of November 2000.

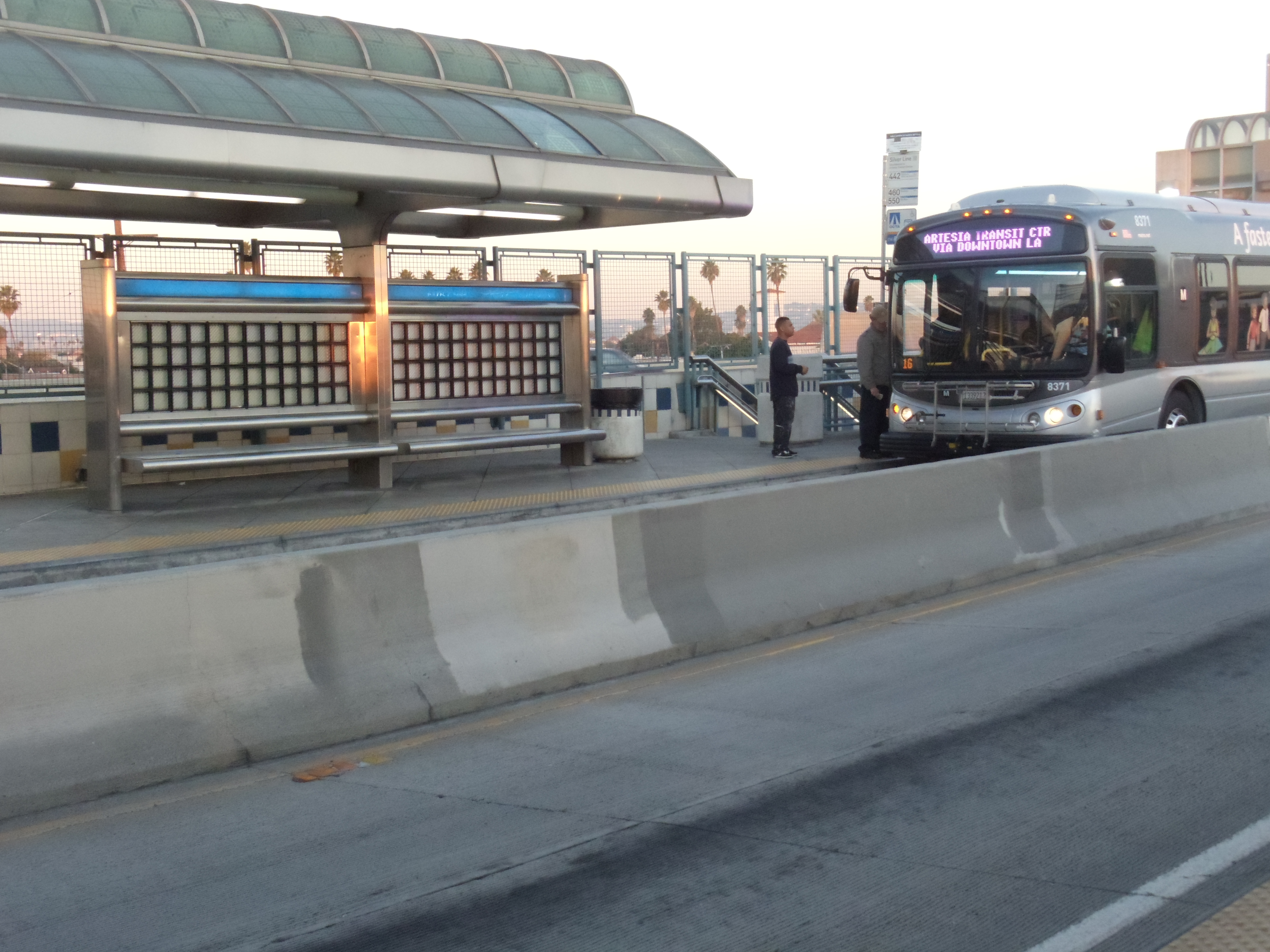
Metro J Line bus stopped at Slauson station on the Harbor Transitway

The area's second busway, the Harbor Transitway, opened in 1996 offering a new connection between Gardena and Downtown Los Angeles. Ridership on the Harbor Transitway was radically lower than expected: Caltrans had projected that 65,200 passengers would travel along the Harbor Transitway each day, but after 10 years, the facility had only attracted 3,000 passengers per weekday.

A third busway to be built in the region came after community revolt against a proposed light rail line in the San Fernando Valley. Los Angeles Metro acquired the Southern Pacific Burbank Branch right of way in 1991, intending to utilize the corridor for light rail trains. Neighbors successfully petitioned lawmakers to pass a ban on utilizing transit tax revenue for anything other than an extension of the existing subway into the San Fernando Valley. However, the passage of Proposition A in 1998 cut off funding for any subway projects. With both subway and light rail now legally prohibited, but with growing political pressure to utilize the former railbed, the last available option was a dedicated busway. This proposal was also opposed by neighborhood groups; however, since the previous law did not prohibit it, it moved forward. The busway opened as the Orange Line (now G Line) on October 29, 2005. The line was a success, attracting nearly 23,000 boardings per day in the first year it was open, and nearly 30,000 boardings per day by 2013. The line is so popular, that in 2014 users petitioned lawmakers to repeal the ban on light rail, and Metro now plans to convert the busway to light rail by 2050.

After the successful launch of the busway in the San Fernando Valley, Metro decided to rebrand the county's other busways in an attempt to increase awareness. In March 2006, Metro decided that the Harbor Transitway would be colored bronze and the El Monte Busway would be colored silver on Metro's maps and the two would be marketed as a "Combined Transitway Service." No changes were made in the operations of the bus routes operated on either facility. The changes were criticized as being difficult to understand for irregular and new riders.

In 2009, Metro returned to plan it first proposed in 1993 and created a new bus rapid transit service called the Silver Line (now J Line) utilizing both the Harbor Transitway and the El Monte Busway. The new higher frequency service would be funded by converting both corridors into high occupancy toll (HOT) lanes, to be branded as the Metro ExpressLanes. The bus route began operations on December 13, 2009. Since the J Line's start, Metro has refurbished the aging stations along both the Harbor Transitway and the El Monte Busway, bringing them closer to the amenities provided along the G Line's busway. The plan has led to higher ridership along the corridor, especially along the Harbor Transitway.

On June 30, 2012, the busway used by the G Line buses was extended northward to the Chatsworth Metrolink station, continuing to follow the former Southern Pacific Burbank Branch right-of-way owned by Metro.

The Siliver Line and Orange Line were renamed in 2020, as part of a systemwide rebranding. The Orange Line was renamed the G Line, and the Silver Line became the J Line.

The following table shows the timeline of BRT expansions:

Segment description	Date opened	Line(s)	Endpoints	# of new stations	Busway length (miles)
Metro Orange Line initial segment	October 29, 2005	G Line	North Hollywood – Warner Center	13	14
Canoga station	December 27, 2006	G Line	Canoga	1 (Note: Canoga was an infill station on the Metro Orange Line, which opened one year later in 2006. The station was built to provide a parking lot near the Warner Center western terminus.)	−
Metro Silver Line initial segment	December 13, 2009	J Line	El Monte – Harbor Gateway Transit Center	9 (Note: Although the route started in December 2009, the stations used are much older. The El Monte Busway stations opened in 1973 and the Harbor Transitway stations opened in 1996.)	26
37th Street/USC station	December 12, 2010	J Line	37th Street/USC	1 (Note: When the Metro Silver Line station opened in 2009, buses did not serve the existing 37th Street/USC station (built in 1997) due to detours from the construction of the Metro Expo Line. Service to the station was added one year later in 2010.)	−
Metro Orange Line Chatsworth Extension	June 30, 2012	G Line	Canoga – Chatsworth	4	4
Metro Silver Line San Pedro Extension	December 13, 2015	J Line	Harbor Gateway Transit Center – San Pedro (Pacific/21st Street)	2	8
Warner Center Shuttle	June 24, 2018	G Line	Warner Center station removed	-1 (Note: The Canoga to Warner Center segment was removed and replaced with a high-frequency shuttle route that serves a larger area of Warner Center.)	−
TOTAL				29	44

== Future ==
Metro plans to add additional Metro Busway lines; some projects may have their timelines accelerated under its Twenty-eight by '28 initiative.

On March 17, 2021, Metro staff came forward with five corridors that the agency could pursue to have bus rapid transit implemented in them.

Concept	Description	Construction	Operational	Status	Ref.
North San Fernando Valley Transit Corridor	This project was supposed to be a new east–west bus rapid transit (BRT) route connecting Metro's Chatsworth's Metrolink Station to the North Hollywood station in Los Angeles' San Fernando Valley. As of May 2022, Metro has dropped the single BRT line approach and instead focuses on improving local bus service via peak hour bus lanes on Roscoe Boulevard and signal priority on seven other lines. The project also adds around 400 bus shelters and 80 bus bulbs throughout the San Fernando Valley. Five major bus stops will receive key improvements (two at CSUN), including larger shelters, more seating, new real-time and wayfinding information, and better lighting. Project implementation is expected to begin in fall 2023 and be completed by winter 2025.	2023	2025	Under construction	
North Hollywood to Pasadena Bus Rapid Transit Project	Creates a new east–west BRT route connecting Metro's Memorial Park station in Pasadena to the North Hollywood station in Los Angeles' San Fernando Valley with stops in Eagle Rock, Glendale and Burbank. Metro currently has Measure M and SB-1 state funds to create the line. Project is set to cost under $267 million to construct. The BRT is expected to begin construction by 2024 and open by 2027 with approximately 22 stations. Part of the Twenty-eight by '28 initiative.	2026	2028	Under construction	
Vermont Transit Corridor	Create a new north–south subway route down Vermont Avenue extending the HRT B Line at the Wilshire/Vermont Station south, to the Metro E Line and C Line. Included as a Tier 2 Strategic Unfunded Plan project in 2009 Long Range Transportation Plan; a Bus rapid transit line has been funded in the near term by Measure M, but studies will be conducted for possible heavy rail transit, as the Vermont corridor is Metro's second busiest public transportation corridor.	2026	2028	Under construction	
G LRT conversion	Converting the current G Line Bus Rapid Transit route into LRT. Made possible after the 2014 repeal of state legislation prohibiting LRT along the G Line right of way, which had been enacted due to neighborhood opposition in the 1990s. Bridges along the busway are designed to LRT standards, but the project would require substantial service disruption as the roadway is replaced by rails and catenary wire installed. Some Valley politicians and pressure groups have endorsed the proposal; critics have suggested funding would be better spent on adding new lines along other corridors in the Valley. Long-term plans include complete conversion in phases with full replacement by 2057. Metro began BRT upgrades in 2018 by adding more grade crossing gates, two new viaducts at Van Nuys Boulevard and Sepulveda Boulevard, reducing travel time by 20%.	2051	2057	No current funds available for LRT until 2051	
Lincoln Boulevard BRT/LRT Line	BRT with eventual LRT conversion along Lincoln Boulevard from LAX/Metro Transit Center to Downtown Santa Monica. The C Line was originally engineered to maintain compatibility with this extension. Included in City of Los Angeles Westside Mobility Plan, and as a Tier 2 Strategic Unfunded Plan project in 2009 Long Range Transportation Plan.	2043	2047	No LPA or EIR conducted	

== See also ==
- List of Los Angeles Metro Busway stations
