= Los Angeles Union Station =

Main railroad station in Los Angeles, California

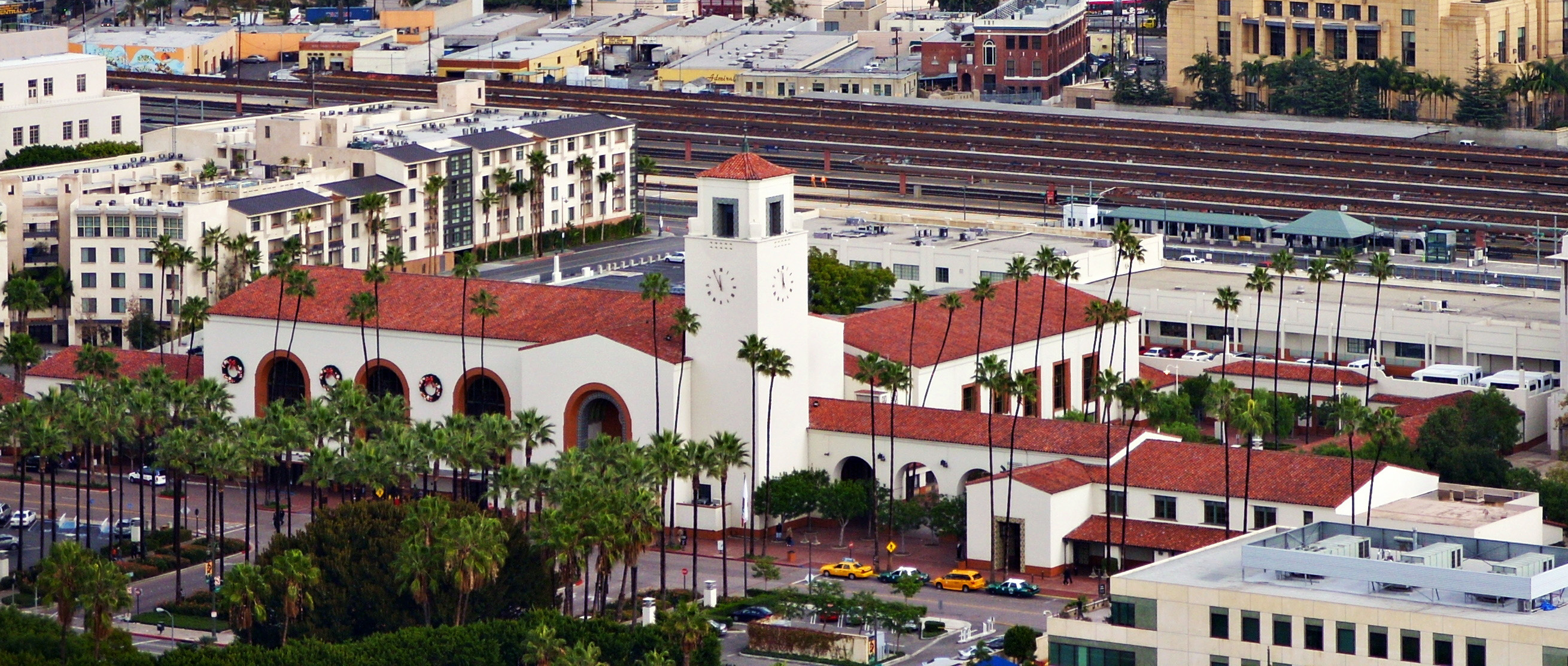
- The main building with tracks in the background, 2008

General information
- Location: 800 North Alameda Street; Los Angeles, California; United States
- Coordinates: 34°03′19″N 118°14′07″W
- Owner: Los Angeles Metro
- Platforms: 6 island platforms
- Tracks: 14
- Connections: See bus and coach services section

Construction
- Parking: 2,189 spaces
- Cycle facilities: Metro Bike Share station, Metro Bike Hub, racks and lockers
- Accessible: Yes

Other information
- Status: Staffed station building with waiting room
- Station code: Amtrak: LAX
- Website: unionstationla.com

History
- Opened: May 3, 1939; 87 years ago

Passengers
- FY 2025: 1,066,614 annually (Amtrak)
- FY 2026: 7,861 weekday boardings (Metrolink)
- FY 2026: 12,016 weekday boardings (Metro)
Services
Preceding station	Amtrak	Following station
Hollywood Burbank Airport toward Seattle	Coast Starlight	Terminus
Glendale toward San Luis Obispo	Pacific Surfliner	Fullerton toward San Diego
Terminus	Southwest Chief	Fullerton toward Chicago
Terminus	Sunset Limited	Pomona toward New Orleans
Terminus	Texas Eagle	Pomona toward Chicago
Preceding station	Metrolink	Following station
Terminus	91/Perris Valley Line	Norwalk/Santa Fe Springs toward Perris–South
Terminus	Orange County Line	Norwalk/Santa Fe Springs toward Oceanside
Terminus	Orange County Line	Commerce (limited service) toward Oceanside
Terminus	Riverside Line	Montebello/Commerce toward Riverside–Downtown
Terminus	San Bernardino Line	Cal State L.A. toward San Bernardino or Redlands
Glendale toward Lancaster	Antelope Valley Line	Terminus
Glendale toward Ventura–East	Ventura County Line	Terminus
Preceding station	Metro Rail	Following station
Little Tokyo/Arts District toward Long Beach	A Line	Chinatown toward Pomona
Civic Center/Grand Park toward North Hollywood	B Line	Terminus
Civic Center/Grand Park toward Wilshire/La Cienega	D Line	Terminus
Preceding station	Metro Busway	Following station
Civic Center/Grand Park (stops en route) toward Harbor Gateway or San Pedro	J Line	LA General Medical Center toward El Monte
Preceding station	Foothill Transit	Following station
Historic Broadway (stops en route) toward Pico	Silver Streak	LA General Medical Center toward Montclair
Civic Center/Grand Park (stops en route) One-way operation	Silver Streak	LA General Medical Center toward Montclair
Former services
Preceding station	Amtrak	Following station
Glendale toward Sacramento	Spirit of California 1981-1983	Terminus
Terminus	Desert Wind 1986-1997	Fullerton toward Chicago
Terminus	San Diegan 1938-2000	Fullerton toward San Diego
Terminus	Desert Wind 1979-1986	Pasadena toward Chicago
Terminus	Southwest Chief 1984-1994	Pasadena toward Chicago
Terminus	Southwest Limited 1974-1984	Pasadena toward Chicago
Terminus	Super Chief 1971–1974	Pasadena toward Chicago
Terminus	Las Vegas Limited 1976	Pasadena toward Las Vegas
Preceding station	Atchison, Topeka and Santa Fe Railway	Following station
Terminus	Main Line Via Pasadena, Pomona	Lincoln Heights toward Chicago
Terminus	Main Line Via Fullerton, Riverside	Rivera toward Chicago
Terminus	Surf Line	Fullerton toward San Diego
Preceding station	Southern Pacific Railroad	Following station
Terminus	Sunset Route	Alhambra toward New Orleans
Glendale toward Oakland Pier	San Joaquin Daylight	Terminus
Glendale toward Sacramento	Sacramento Daylight	Terminus
Glendale toward San Francisco	Coast Daylight	Terminus
Glendale toward San Francisco	Lark	Terminus
Glendale toward San Jose	Los Angeles – San Jose	Terminus
River toward San Francisco	Coast Line	Terminus
Preceding station	Union Pacific Railroad	Following station
Terminus	Los Angeles and Salt Lake Railroad	East Los Angeles toward Salt Lake City
Preceding station	CalTrain	Following station
Glendale toward Oxnard	Los Angeles–Oxnard	Terminus
Preceding station	Metro Rail	Following station
Little Tokyo/Arts District (at-grade) Plaza toward East Los Angeles	L Line	Chinatown toward Azusa
Future services
Preceding station	Brightline	Following station
Palmdale toward Las Vegas	Brightline West High Desert Corridor	Terminus
Preceding station	California High-Speed Rail	Following station
Burbank Airport toward Merced or San Francisco	Phase 1	Anaheim Terminus
- Los Angeles Union Passenger Terminal
- U.S. National Register of Historic Places
- Los Angeles Historic-Cultural Monument
- Built: 1939
- Built by: Robert E. McKee Inc.
- Architect: John and Donald Parkinson
- Architectural style: Moderne, Art Deco, Mission/Spanish Revival
- NRHP reference No.: 80000811
- LAHCM No.: 101

Significant dates
- Added to NRHP: November 13, 1980
- Designated LAHCM: August 2, 1972
Location

Los Angeles Union Station is the main railroad station in Los Angeles, California, and the largest passenger rail terminal in the Western United States. It opened in May 1939 as the Los Angeles Union Passenger Terminal, replacing La Grande Station, Central Station, and Salt Lake Station.

Approved in a controversial ballot measure in 1926 and built in the 1930s, it served to consolidate rail services from the Santa Fe, Southern Pacific, and Union Pacific railroads into one terminal station. Conceived on a grand scale, Union Station became known as the "Last of the Great Railway Stations" built in the United States. The structure combines Art Deco, Mission Revival, and Streamline Moderne style. It was placed on the National Register of Historic Places in 1980.

Today, the station is a major transportation hub for Southern California, serving almost 110,000 passengers a day. It is by far the busiest railroad station in the Western United States; it is Amtrak's seventh-busiest station, and is the sixteenth-busiest railroad station in North America.

Four of Amtrak's long-distance trains originate and terminate here: the Coast Starlight to Seattle, the Southwest Chief and Texas Eagle to Chicago, and the Sunset Limited to New Orleans. The state-supported Amtrak Pacific Surfliner regional trains run frequently to San Diego and also to Santa Barbara and San Luis Obispo. The station is the hub of the Metrolink commuter rail system and is a major transfer point for several Metro Rail light rail and rapid transit lines. The Patsaouras Transit Plaza, on the east side of the station, serves dozens of bus lines operated by Los Angeles Metro and several other municipal carriers.

== History ==
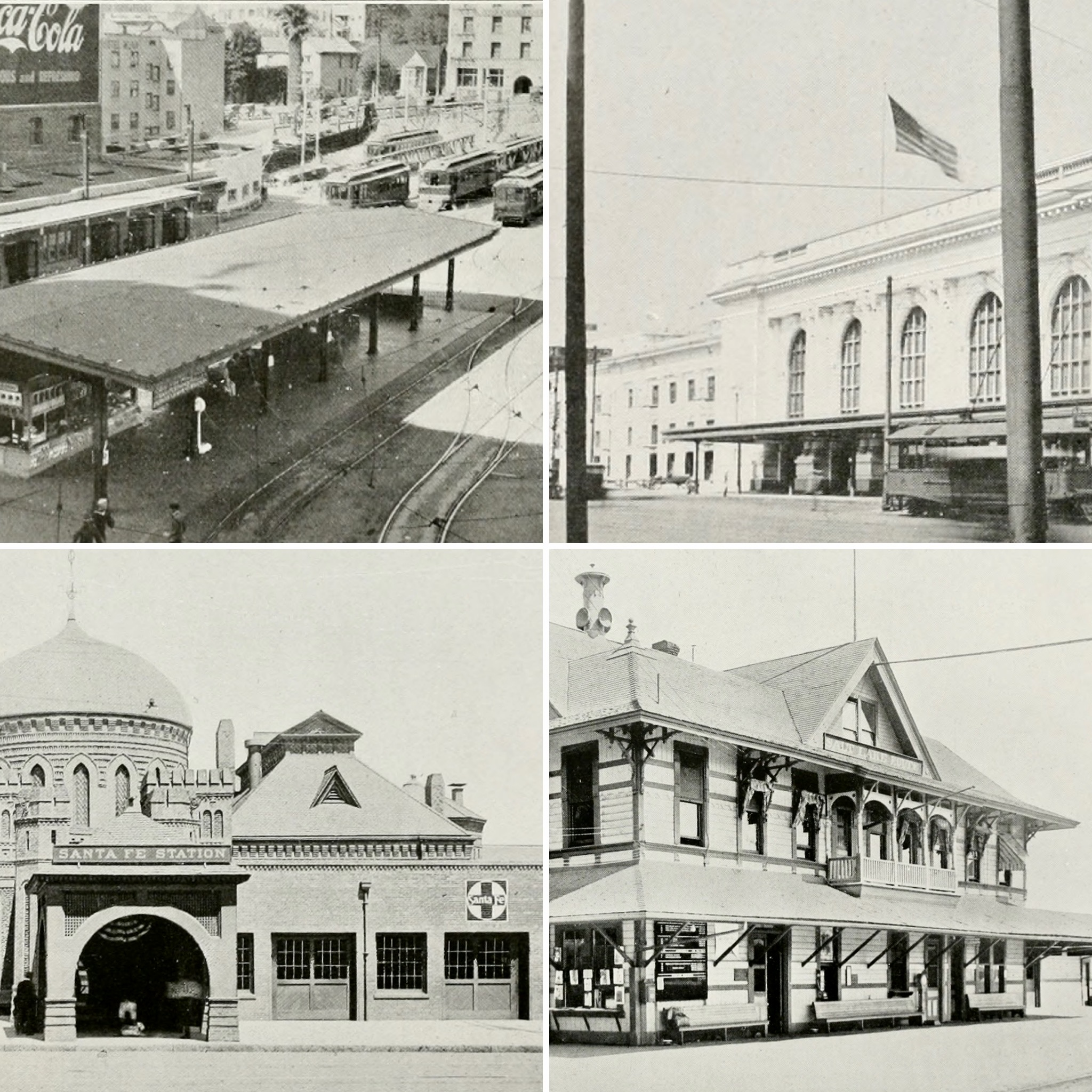
Pre-unification passenger railway stations of Los Angeles, c. 1920 (clockwise from top left): Pacific Electric Building (Pacific Electric), Central Station (Southern Pacific), Salt Lake Station, (Union Pacific), La Grande Station (Santa Fe)

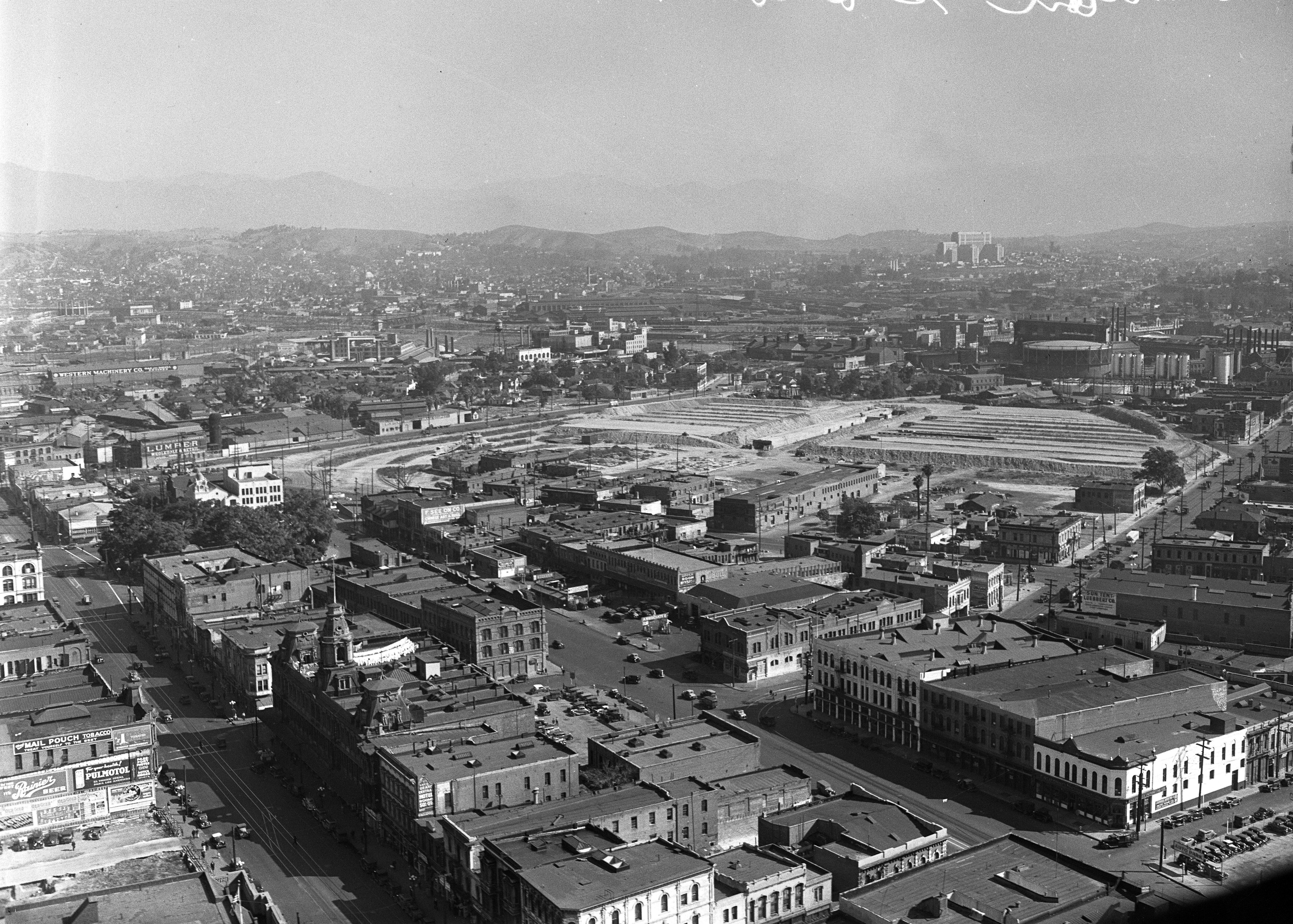
Future site of Union Station, Los Angeles, 1935

The Los Angeles City Council had desired since the 1910s to construct a union station to replace the existing three terminal stations in Los Angeles: the Santa Fe's La Grande Station, the Southern Pacific's Central Station, and the Union Pacific's Salt Lake Station. As the proposed station would be built and owned by the city and open to all prospective railroads, it threatened to break these three railroads' control over rail traffic into and out of the city. Their opposition led to a series of legal cases that were still not resolved by 1925, when the railroads offered a compromise solution. The Union Pacific's Salt Lake Station had burned down in 1924, forcing it to rent space in the Southern Pacific's Central Station. The railroads proposed to make this arrangement permanent, reducing the number of terminals to two, while also constructing a large network of elevated tracks at their own expense, to be used by them and the Pacific Electric. Not only would the new electrified tracks link the two terminals, but they would eliminate street running on some of the busiest streets in Los Angeles.

The railroads' proposal immediately generated public controversy for and against the proposal, and in February 1926 the council agreed to place a non-binding question on the ballot asking voters whether they were in favor of the city council's union station proposal or the railroads' elevated railway plan. Proposition 8 asked "Shall a Union Railway Passenger Terminal for all steam railroads be established in the City of Los Angeles?", while Proposition 9 asked whether the proposed station should be built in Los Angeles Plaza. The issue became extremely heated, with both sides fiercely arguing their point. Elevated railway proponents, such as the Los Angeles Examiner and the Greater Los Angeles Chamber of Commerce, pointed to the safety benefits of the elimination of grade crossings and the benefits to businesses of reduced traffic congestion, as well as claiming that the proposed union station site would cause heavy road congestion. Union station proponents, such as the Los Angeles Times and many homeowner associations, claimed that elevated railways harmed property values, made streets dangerously dark, produced unacceptable levels of noise, and were less safe than other forms of railroad. As the Los Angeles Plaza was near Los Angeles' original Chinatown, the debate took on racial connotations as well, with the Examiner claiming that being near Chinatown would mean that visitors to the city would receive a bad first impression, and the Times countering by arguing that the construction of the station would allow for urban renewal that would "spell the passing of Chinatown".

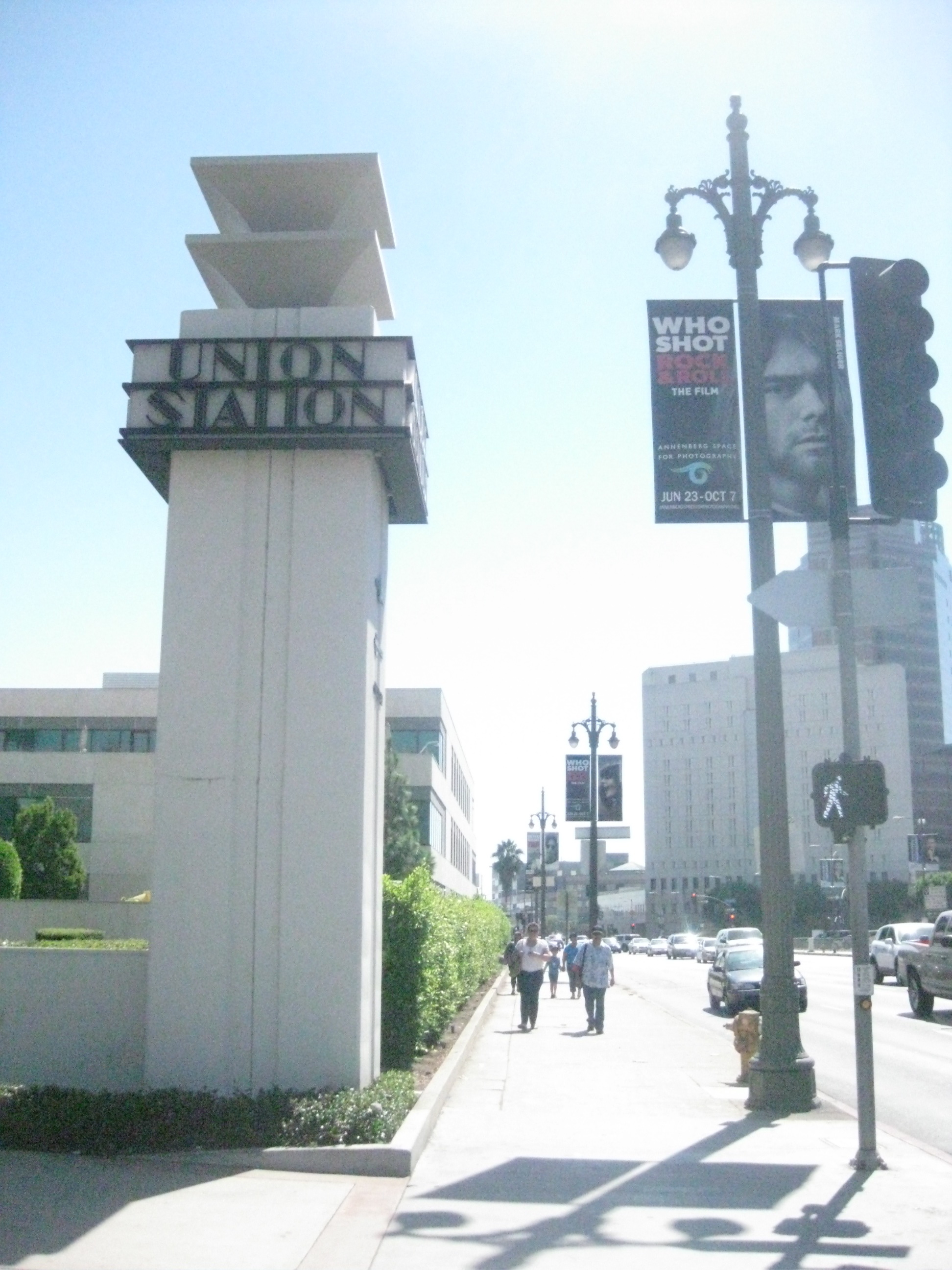
Union Station sign.

When the two propositions were finally put to a vote, both passed; Proposition 8 by a 61.3 to 38.7 percent margin, and Proposition 9 by a much smaller 51.1 to 48.9 percent margin. However, largely due to the efforts of preservationist Christine Sterling and Los Angeles Times publisher Harry Chandler, Union Station would not replace the Plaza, but be built across the street in Chinatown, which was demolished for the project. During the construction process of Union Station, archaeological remains from the Tongva village of Yaanga were uncovered. Researcher Joan Brown summarized this in 1992:

Previous archaeological studies conducted at and near Union Station indicate that buried intact prehistoric and historic deposits exist in-situ beneath and in the vicinity of Union Station. The extent of the archaeological deposits is unknown at this time. Union Station was constructed on three to twenty feet of fill dirt placed over the original Los Angeles Chinatown. Chinatown, in turn, had been built over the remains of an Indian village, tentatively identified as the village of Yangna.

The glamorous new $11 million station (in 1939 dollars) took over from La Grande Station which had suffered major damage in the 1933 Long Beach earthquake and Central Station, which had itself replaced the Arcade Depot in 1914.

Passenger service was provided by the Santa Fe, Southern Pacific, and Union Pacific, as well as local lines of the Pacific Electric Railway and Los Angeles Railway (LARy). The famed Super Chief luxury train carried Hollywood stars and others to Chicago and thence the East Coast. Union Station saw heavy use during World War II, but later saw declining patronage due to policy shifts on the state and federal levels promoting the use of air travel and automobiles over passenger rail.

In 1948, the Santa Fe's Super Chief lost its brakes coming into the station, smashed through a steel bumper and concrete wall, and stopped with one third of the front of the locomotive dangling over Aliso St. No one was killed or injured, but the engineer lost his job.

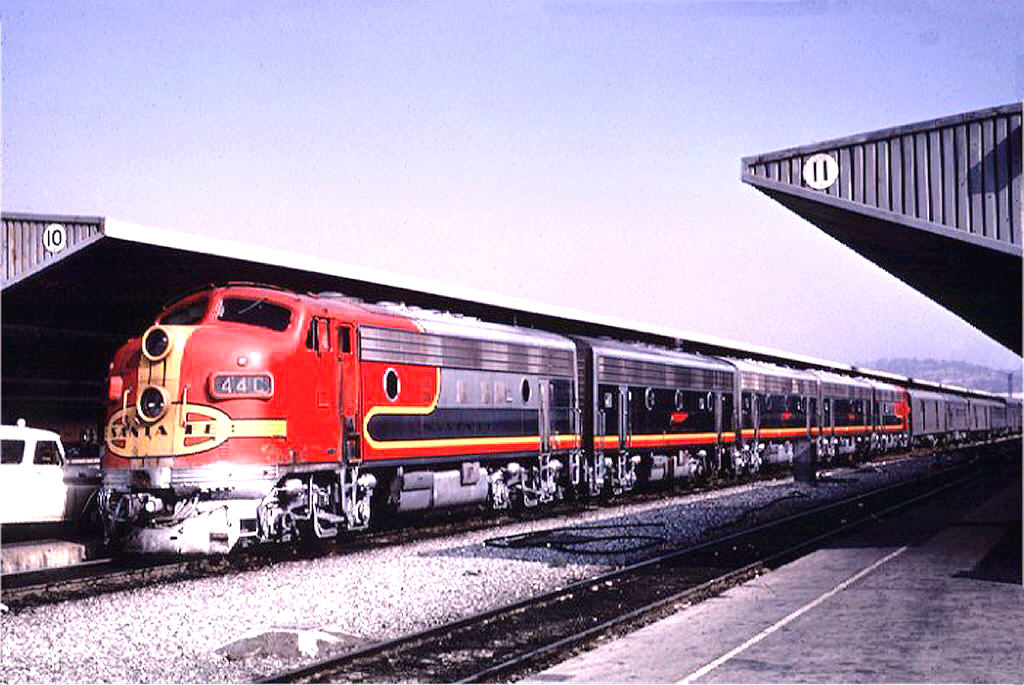
Santa Fe's combined Super Chief/El Capitan at the station in 1966

The station was designated as a Los Angeles Historic–Cultural Monument No. 101 on August 2, 1972, and placed on the National Register of Historic Places in 1980.

The first commuter rail service to Union Station was the short-lived CalTrain that began operating on October 18, 1982, between Los Angeles and Oxnard. The service faced economic and political problems from the start and was suspended in March 1983. The next attempt at commuter rail came in 1990 with the launch of the Amtrak-operated Orange County Commuter. The once-daily round-trip served stations between Los Angeles and San Juan Capistrano.

In December 1989, the Santa Fe Pacific Realty Co purchased Southern Pacific's shareholding in the station, followed in January 1990 by Union Pacific's 22% and Santa Fe's 34%.

Metrolink commuter rail service began on October 26, 1992, with Union Station as the terminus for the San Bernardino Line, the Santa Clarita Line (later renamed the Antelope Valley Line) and the Ventura County Line. In January 1993, Metro's Red Line subway began service to the station, followed by Metrolink's Riverside Line in June. The Orange County Commuter train was discontinued on March 28, 1994, and replaced by Metrolink's Orange County Line. In May 2002, Metrolink added additional service to stations in Orange and Riverside counties with the opening of the 91 Line (now the 91/Perris Valley Line.)

Light rail service arrived at Union Station on July 26, 2003, when Metro's Gold Line began operating to Pasadena from tracks 1 and 2. The line was expanded south over US 101 in November 2009 with the opening of the Gold Line Eastside Extension.

In February 2011, the board of Los Angeles Metro approved the purchase of Union Station from Prologis and Catellus Development (a descendant of the Santa Fe and Southern Pacific railroads) for $75 million. The deal was closed on April 14, 2011. Since taking over ownership of the station, Metro has focused on increasing services for passengers at the station. One of the most noticeable changes is the addition of several retail and dining businesses to the concourse.

Amtrak opened a Metropolitan Lounge at Union Station on September 23, 2013. The lounge is open to Amtrak passengers traveling in sleeping car accommodations as well as some Amtrak Guest Rewards members (Select Plus and Select Executive levels only). The lounge features a staffed ticket counter, complimentary refreshments, complimentary Wi-Fi, and a conference room. Passengers using the Metropolitan Lounge receive priority boarding.

Metro plans to install Bluetooth beacons in Union Station to enable sending text messages to travelers' smartphones.

On March 15, 2021, it was announced that the station would serve as a joint venue of the 93rd Academy Awards along with the Dolby Theatre due to the impact of the COVID-19 pandemic on cinema. The ceremony was criticized for limiting access to the station and its COVID-19 testing site due to security measures mandated by the academy.

On October 19, 2022, Greyhound moved its primary Los Angeles station to the Patsaouras Transit Plaza at Union Station.

== Architecture ==
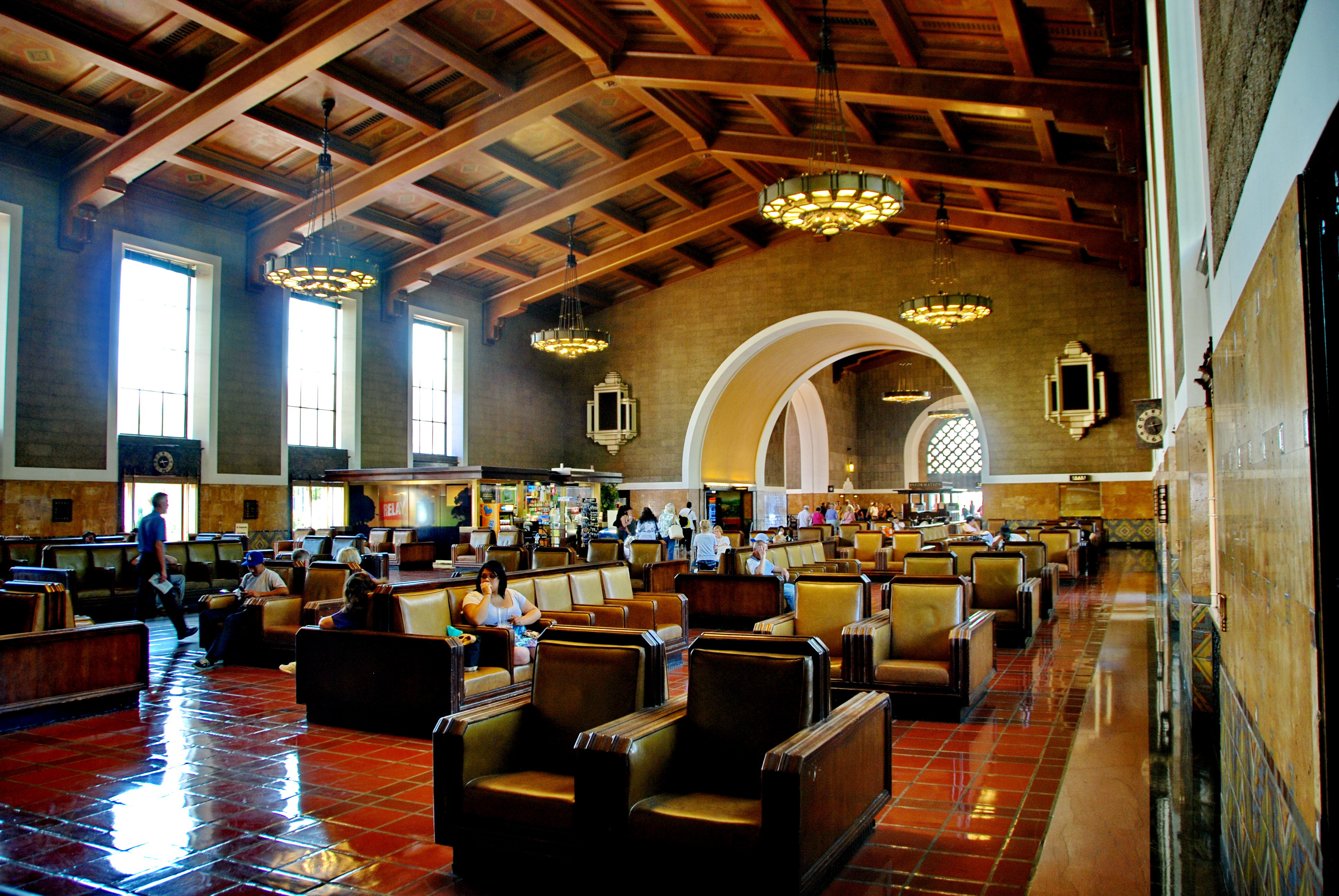
The waiting room

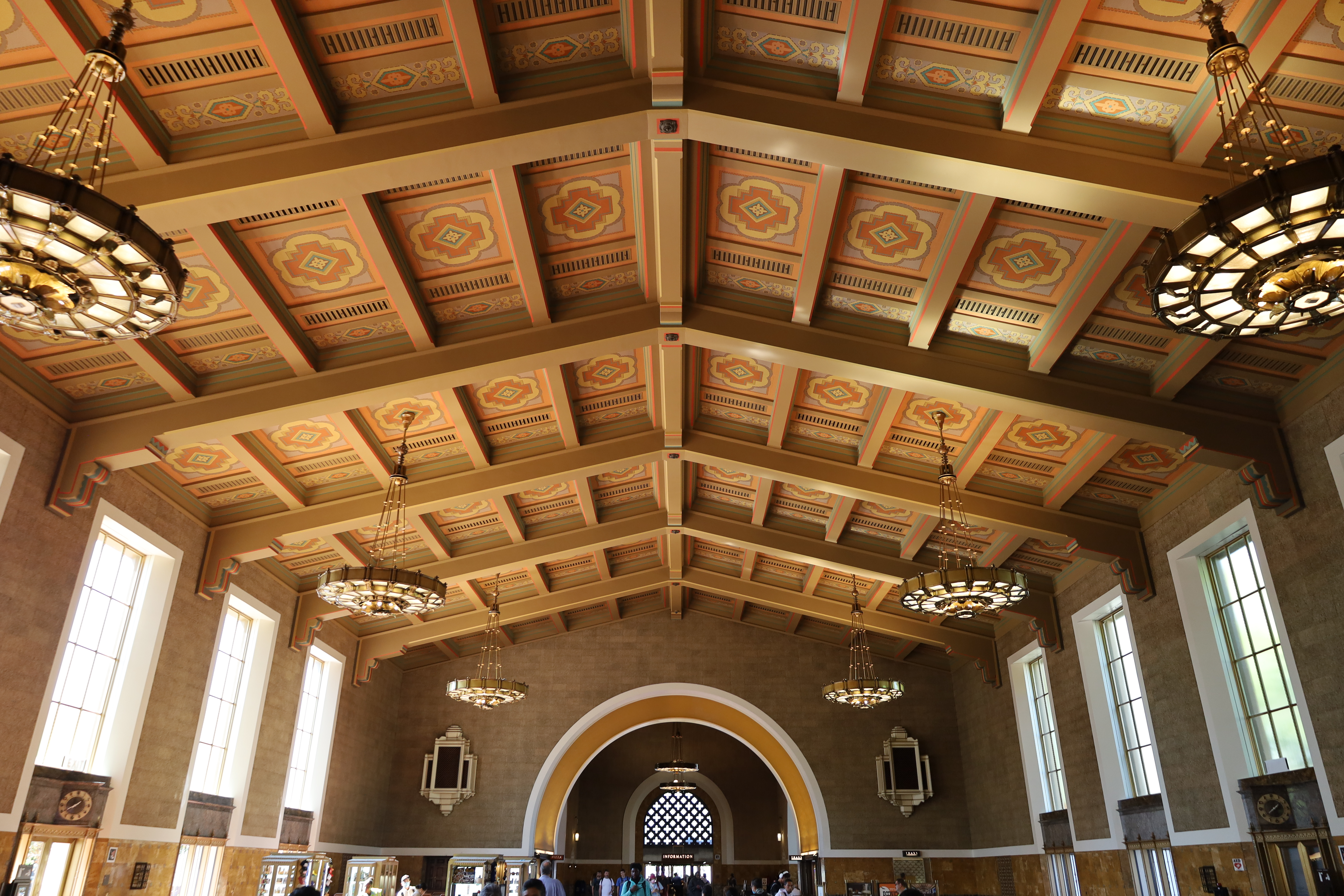
The restored waiting room ceiling in 2022

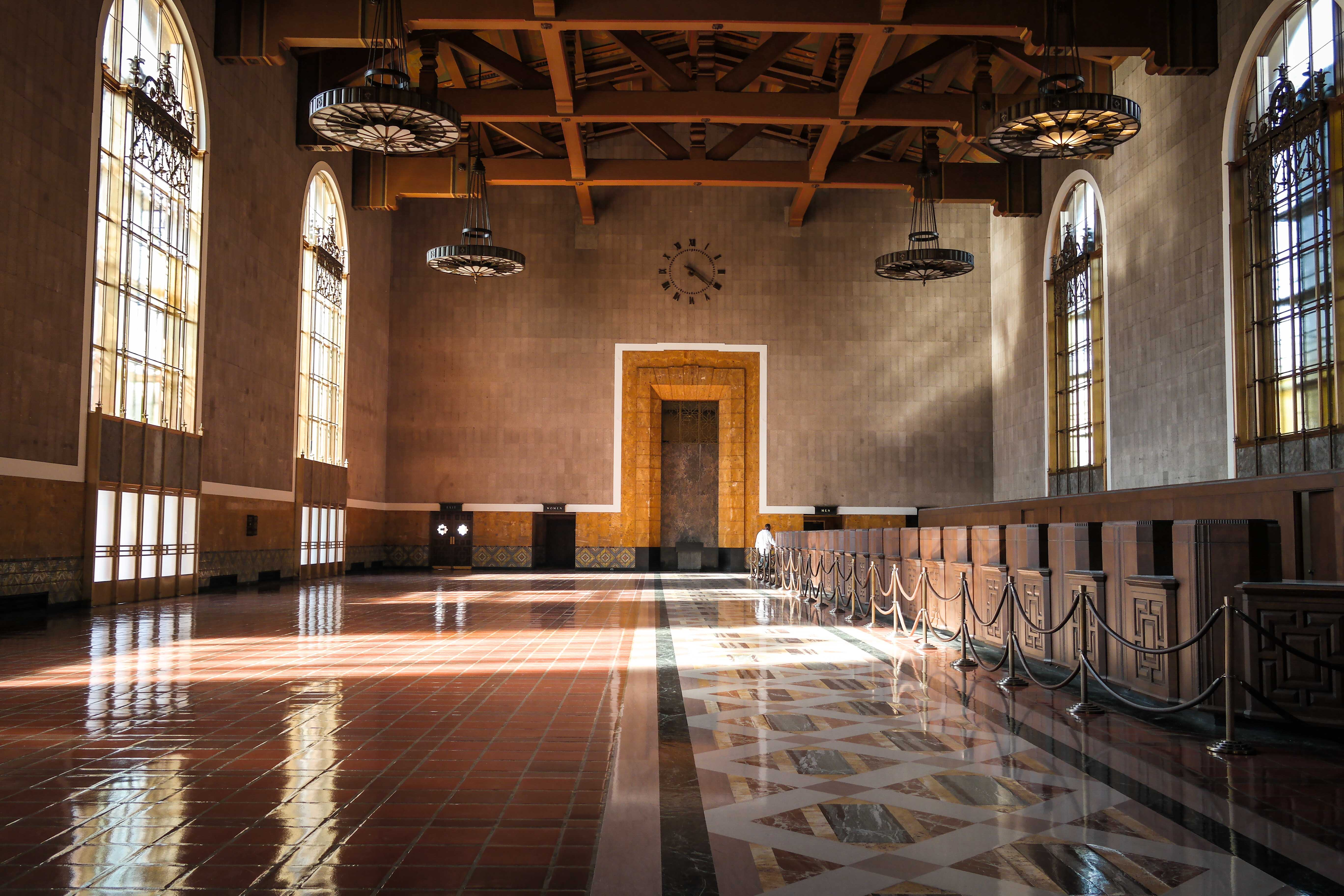
The original ticket lobby, with the ticket counter at the right

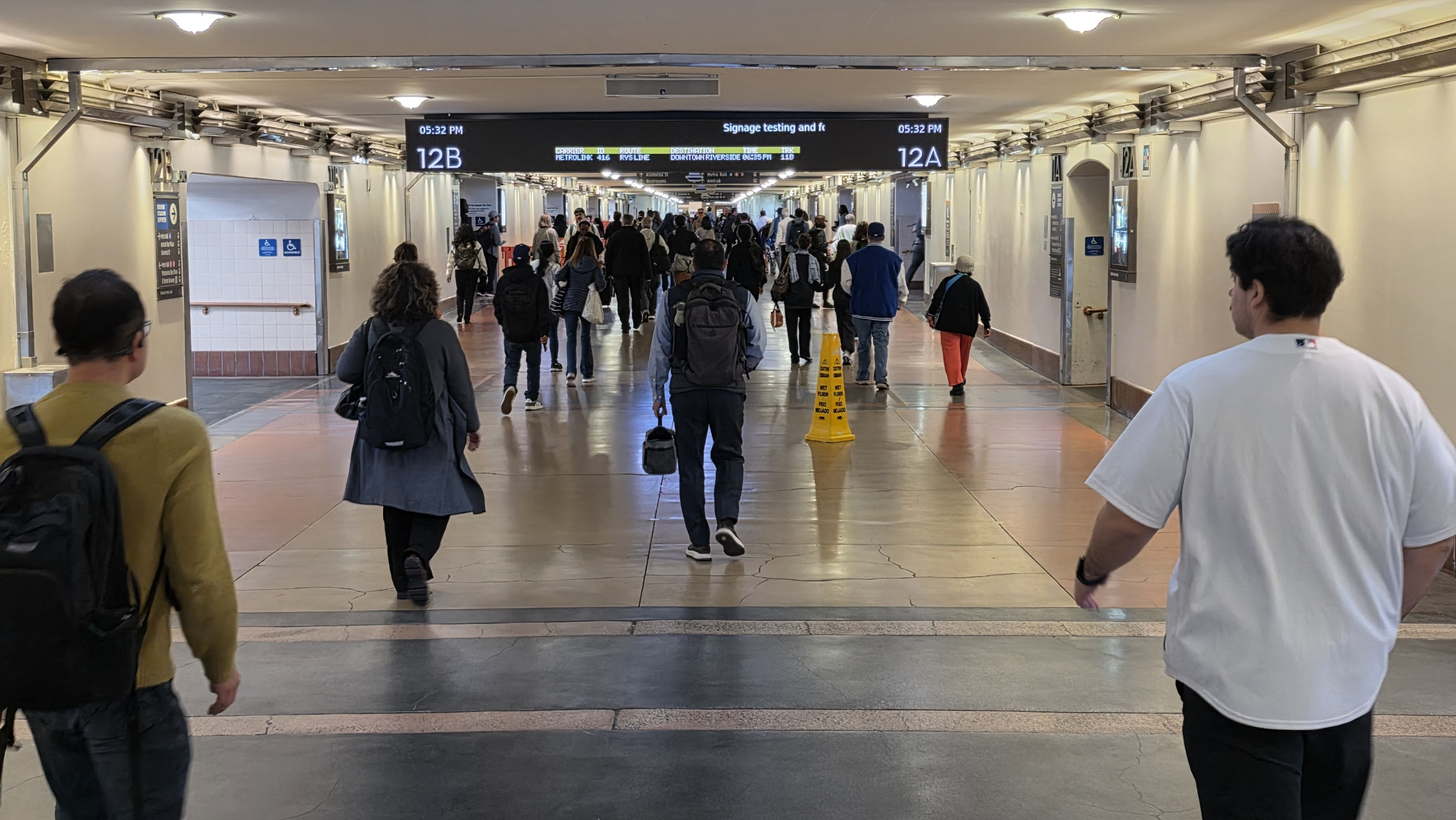
The underground walkway to train platforms

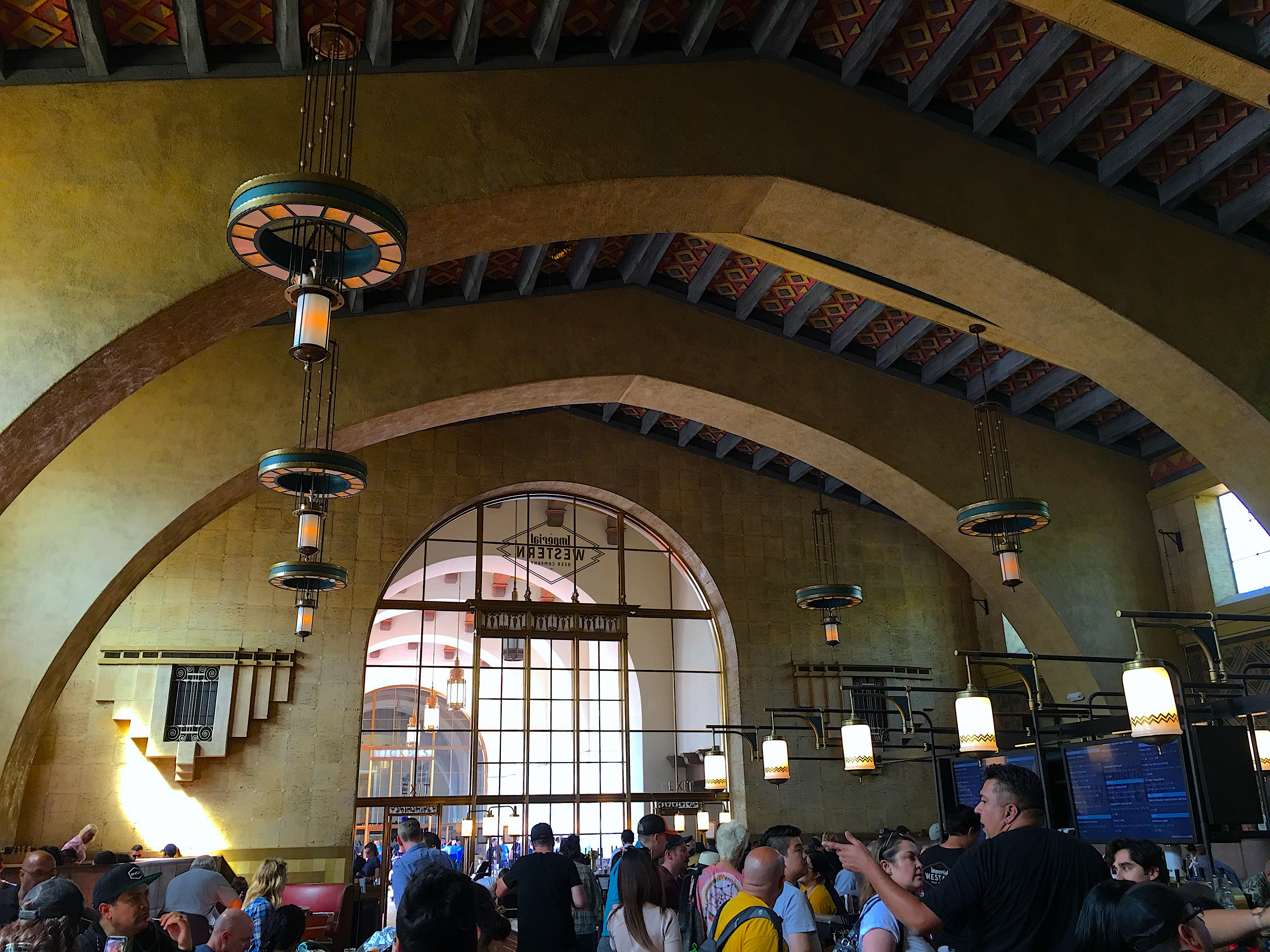
The Harvey House

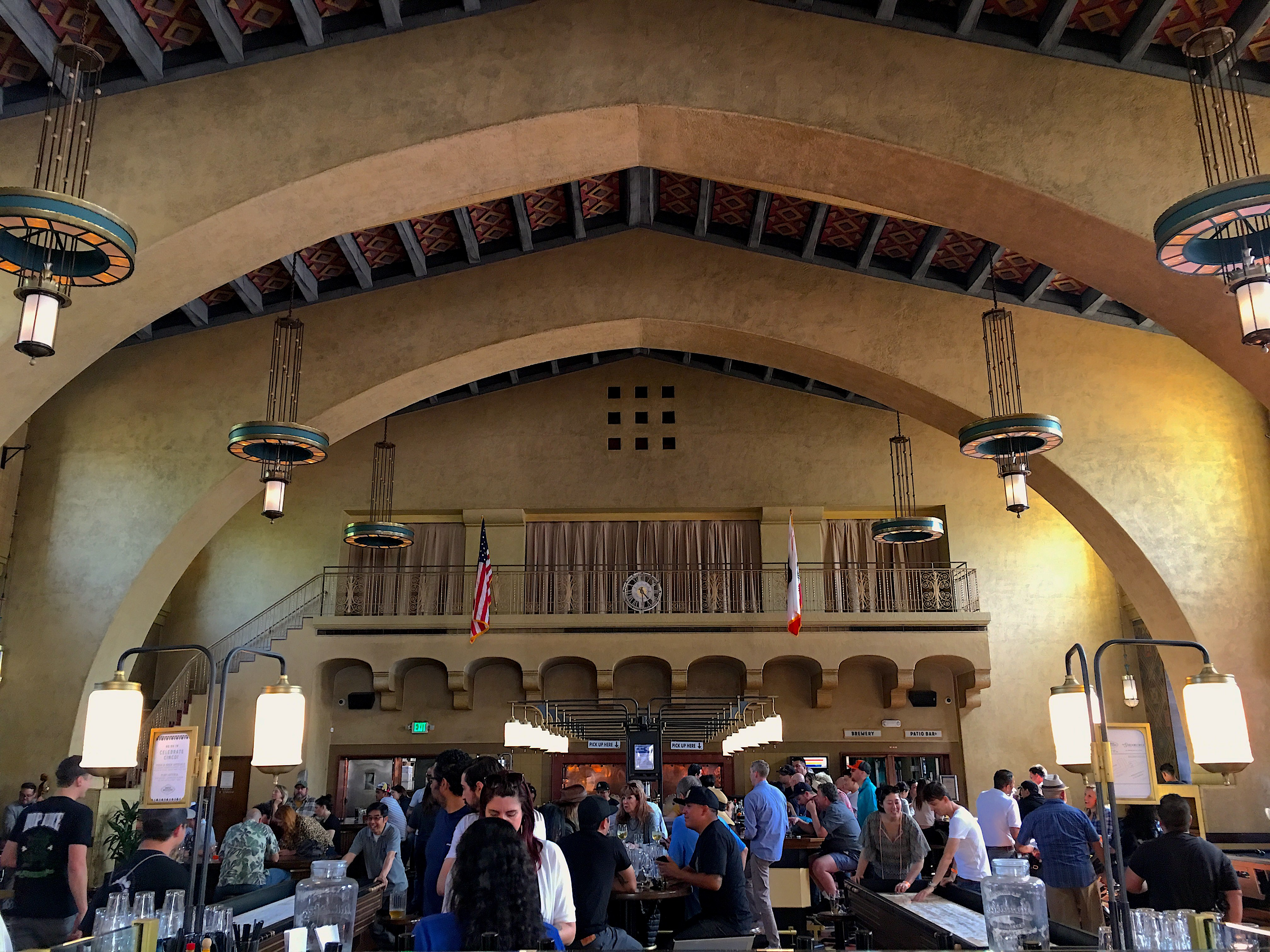
The Harvey House

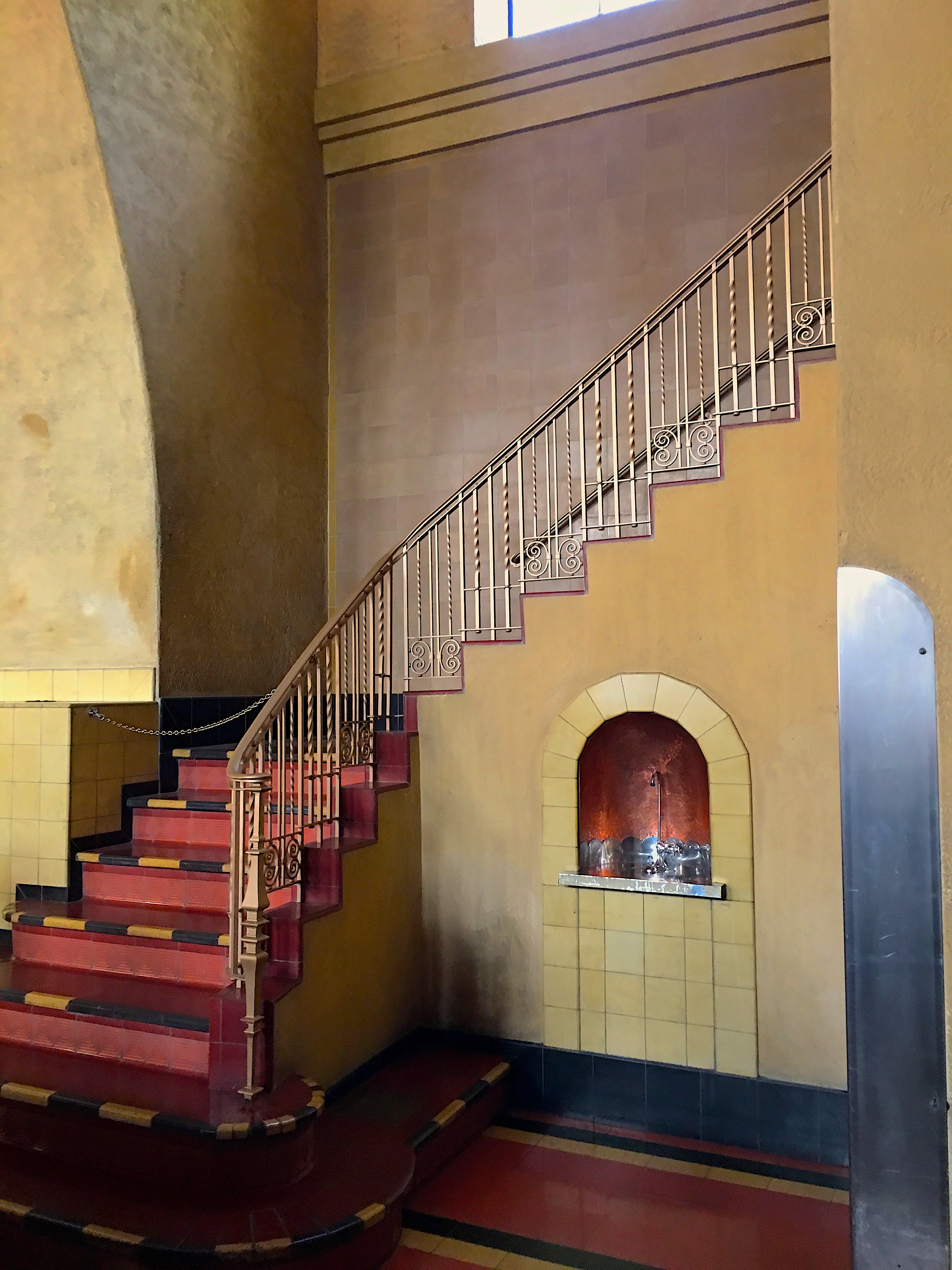
Stairs in the Harvey House

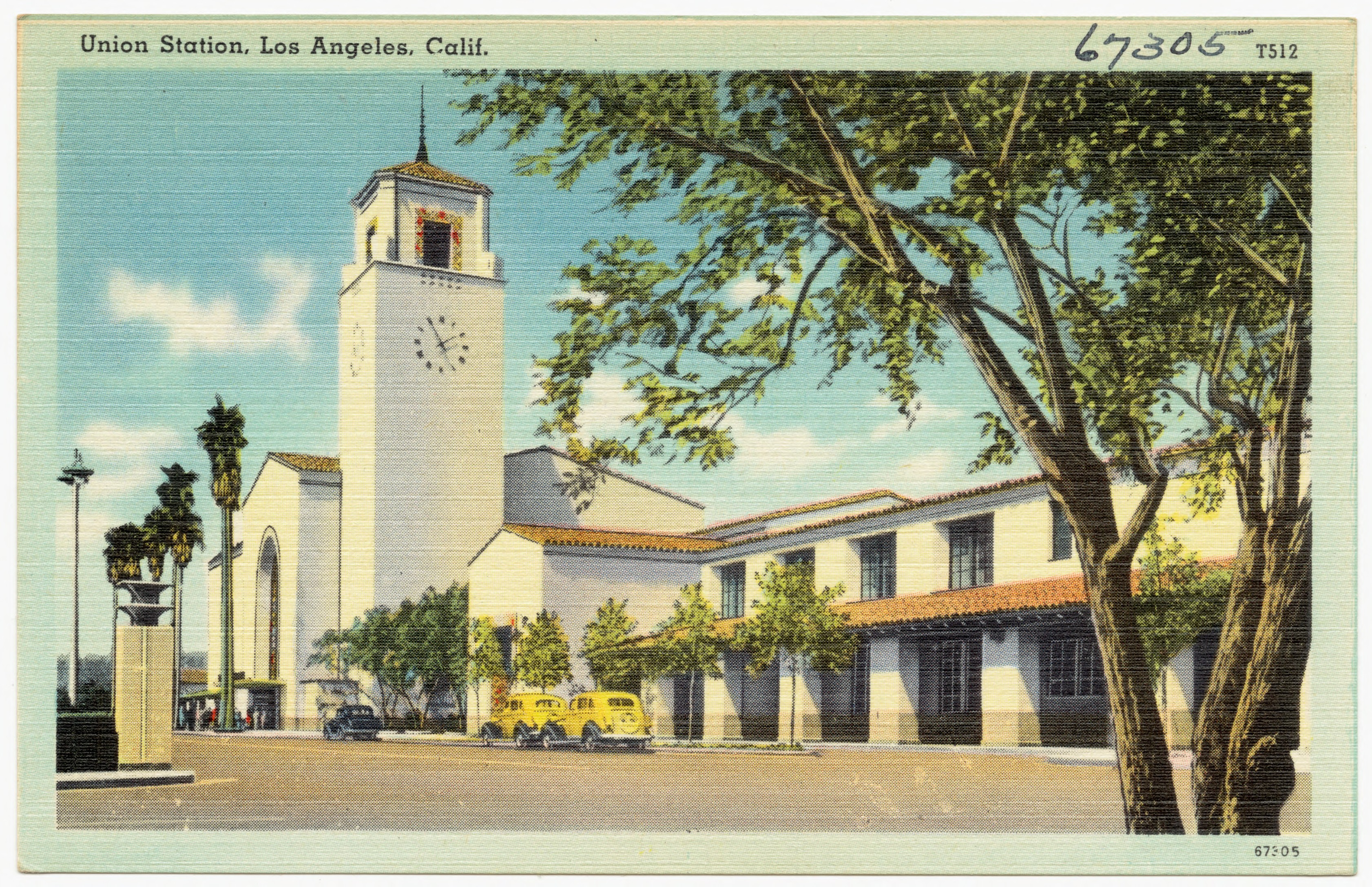
Depicted on postcard

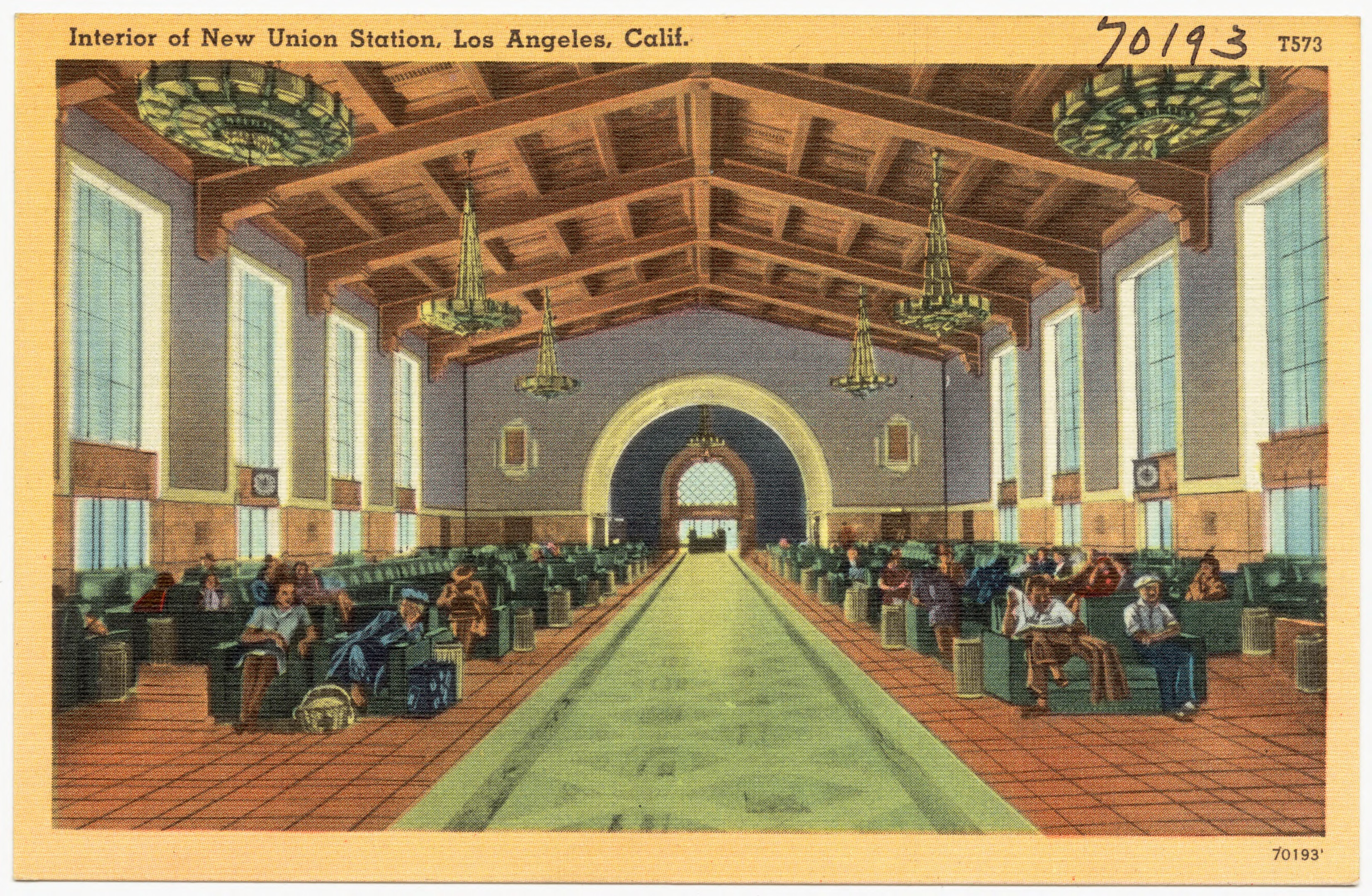
Postcard

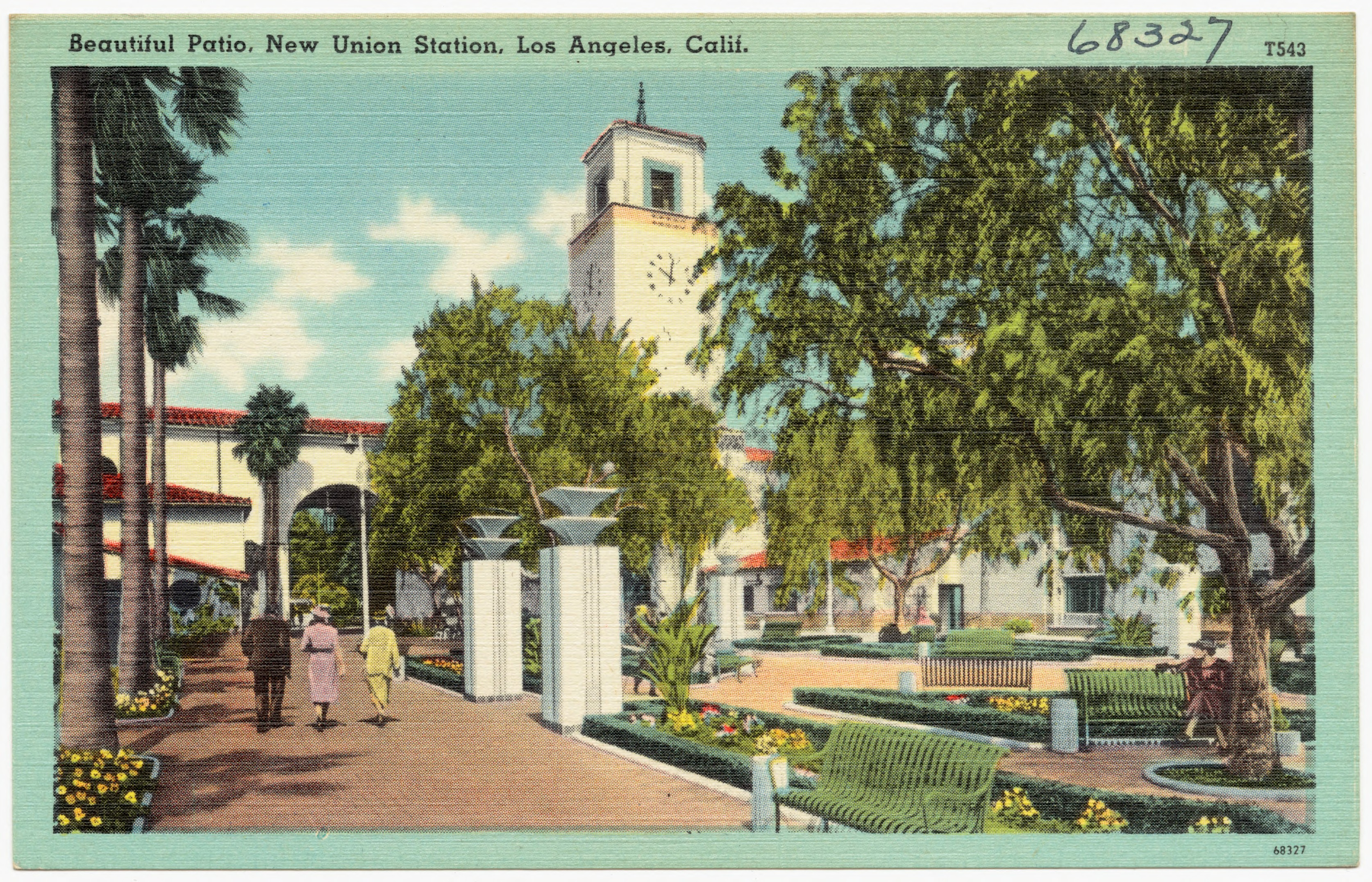
Patio depicted on postcard

Union Station was partially designed by John and Donald Parkinson, the father-and-son architectural firm who had also designed Los Angeles City Hall and other landmark Los Angeles buildings. They were assisted by a group of supporting architects, including Jan van der Linden. The structure combines Art Deco, Mission Revival, and Streamline Moderne style, with architectural details such as eight-pointed stars, and even elements of Dutch Colonial Revival architecture (at the suggestion of the Dutch-born Jan von der Linden).

Enclosed garden patios are on either side of the waiting room, and passengers exiting the trains were originally directed through the southern garden. The lower parts of the interior walls are covered in travertine marble; the upper parts have an early form of acoustical tile. The floor in the large rooms is terra cotta with a central strip of inlaid marble (including travertine, somewhat unusual in floors since it is soft). The ceiling in the grand waiting room has the appearance of wood, but is actually made of steel.

The original ticket lobby has 62-foot (19 m) high ceilings and a 110-foot (34 m) counter. It is closed to the public, but occasionally rented out for film shoots or special events. Public art has been added to the station including an aquarium with a wall featuring etchings of Tongva and Latino settlers such as Pío Pico.

Inside the grand waiting room is the Traxx restaurant and bar, which is Art Deco-themed, reflecting the history and architectural grandeur of its home. The restaurant opened in the late 1990s, and became a "top draw" at Union Station, according to the Los Angeles Times. Traxx closed between May and September 2019 as ownership of the restaurant changed.

Attached to the main building to the south is the station restaurant designed by the famed Southwestern architect Mary Colter. It was the last of the "Harvey House" restaurants to be constructed as a part of a passenger terminal. The vast rectangular dining room has a rounded central counter, streamlined booths and inlaid cement tile floor in the pattern of a Navajo blanket.

Colter also designed a sleek, Streamline Moderne cocktail lounge. The restaurant closed in 1967 and for decades remained largely empty, used only for the occasional film shoot or special event. In October 2018, following a four-year renovation process, the dining room re-opened as the "Imperial Western Beer Co.," a restaurant and bar with its own attached brewery, and the cocktail lounge re-opened as "The Streamliner," a smaller craft cocktail bar.

Even with its grand scale, Union Station is still considered small in comparison to other union stations.

== Public art ==
Although Union Station contains no distinct sculptures or artworks from its early years, Metro rail development in the 1990s funded the installation of a variety of notable public art murals and sculptural installations for the station's new subterranean lobbies, portals and subway platforms. The following Union Station public artworks include murals, granite seating sculptures, electronic wall-mounted art, glass mosaics, and a river-themed sculptural installation incorporating found objects from the subway excavation and an aquarium of native sea life.

- L.A.: City of Angels (1993) by Cynthia Carlson
- Traveler (1993) by Terry Schoonhoven
- Union Chairs (1993) by Christopher Sproat
- La Sombra del Arroyo (1995) by East Los Streetscapers
- City of Dreams (1996) by Richard Wyatt Jr.
- River of History (1996) by May Sun
- Riverbench (1996) by May Sun and Paul Diez
- A-Train (1996) by Bill Bell
- Solar Shift: San Bernardino and Santa Monica (2006) by Roy Nicholson

== Location ==
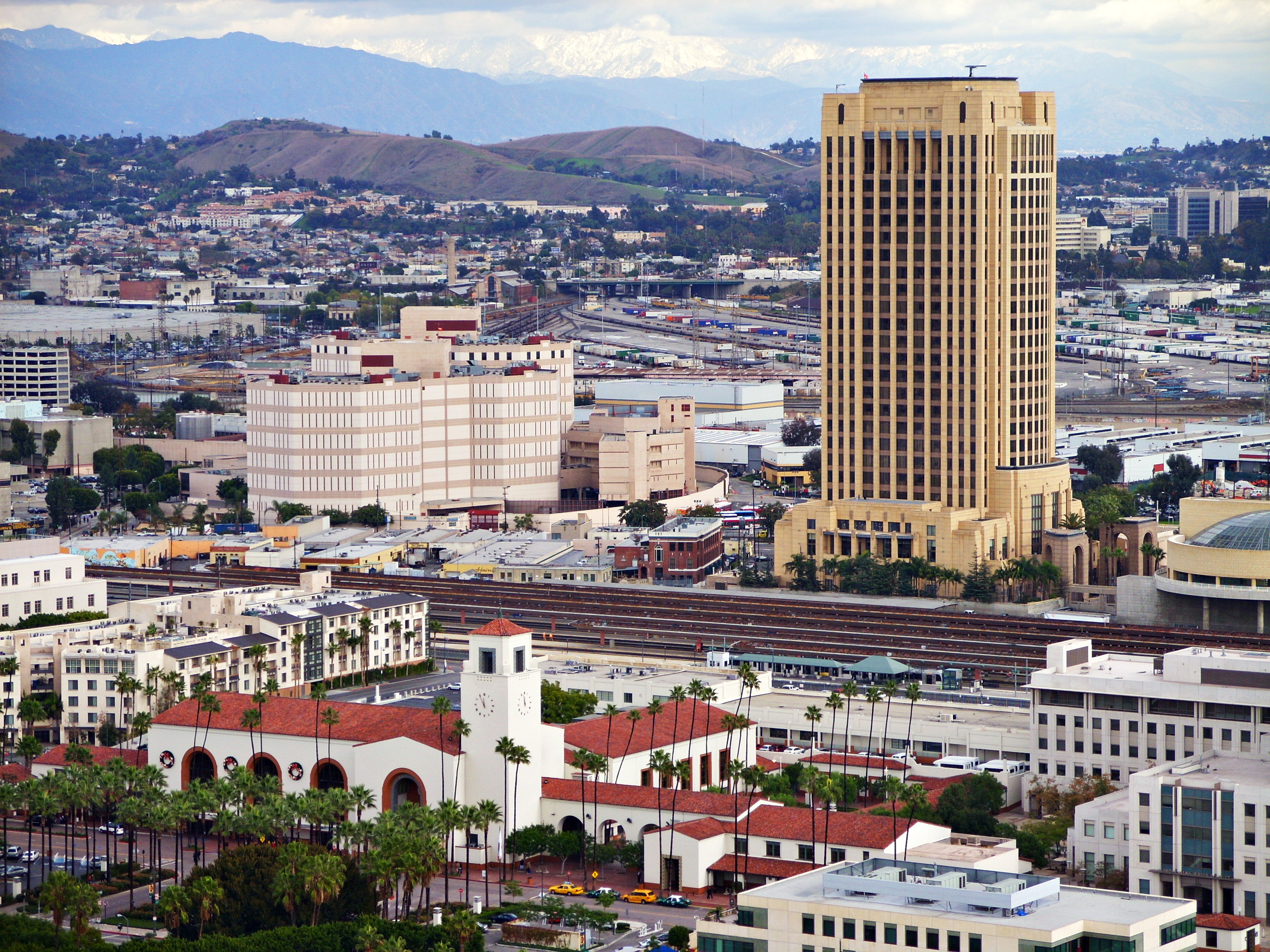
Union Station and the MTA Building, with the Twin Towers Correctional Facility to the left of the latter

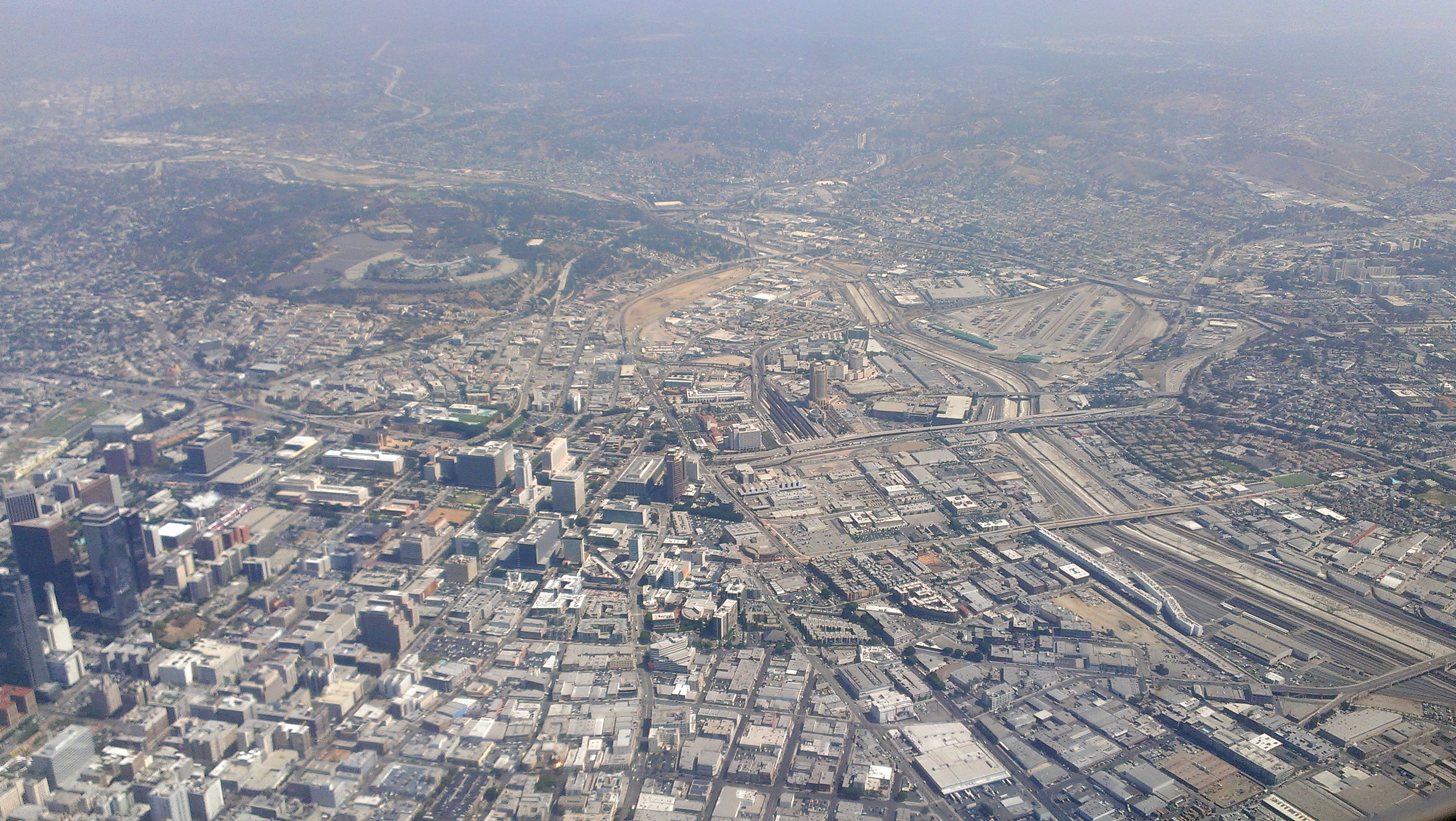
An aerial view of LA Union Station area in 2014.

Union Station is located in the northeastern corner of downtown Los Angeles, on the property bounded by Alameda Street, Cesar Chavez Avenue, Vignes Street, and the Hollywood Freeway. It is across Alameda Street from L.A.'s historic Olvera Street and El Pueblo de Los Angeles State Historic Park. The historic Terminal Annex building is on the opposite side of the Chavez Avenue underpass. Chinatown and Civic Center are a short distance away.

The Patsaouras Transit Plaza on the east side of Union Station hosts several connecting bus lines, including Metro Local, Metro Rapid and Metro Express lines, as well as downtown DASH shuttles, many municipal bus lines, FlyAway express bus service to Los Angeles International Airport, Greyhound buses, and University of Southern California campus shuttles. The Transit Plaza is named after Nick Patsaouras, former RTD board member and advocate for public transportation.

The Gateway Transit Center includes the station itself and the Patsaouras Transit Plaza, both of which were designed by Ehrenkrantz & Eckstut, along with the western terminus of the El Monte Busway, as well as Metro's headquarters building.

As of October 2019, Amtrak and Metrolink share 12 of Union Station's 14 outdoor tracks, with 94 trains departing on most weekdays (95 on Wednesday, 96 on Friday). (Note: 1 Amtrak Coast Starlight departure, 18 Amtrak Pacific Surfliner departures (13 southbound, 5 northbound), 1 Amtrak Southwest Chief departure, 17 Metrolink Ventura County Line departures, 15 Metrolink Antelope Valley Line departures, 19 Metrolink San Bernardino Line departures, 6 Metrolink Riverside Line departures, 6 Metrolink 91/Perris Valley Line departures, and 11 Metrolink Orange County Line departures. There is an additional Metrolink San Bernardino Line departure on Friday nights, and the Amtrak Sunset Limited operates tri-weekly (Sunday, Wednesday and Friday).)

== Services ==
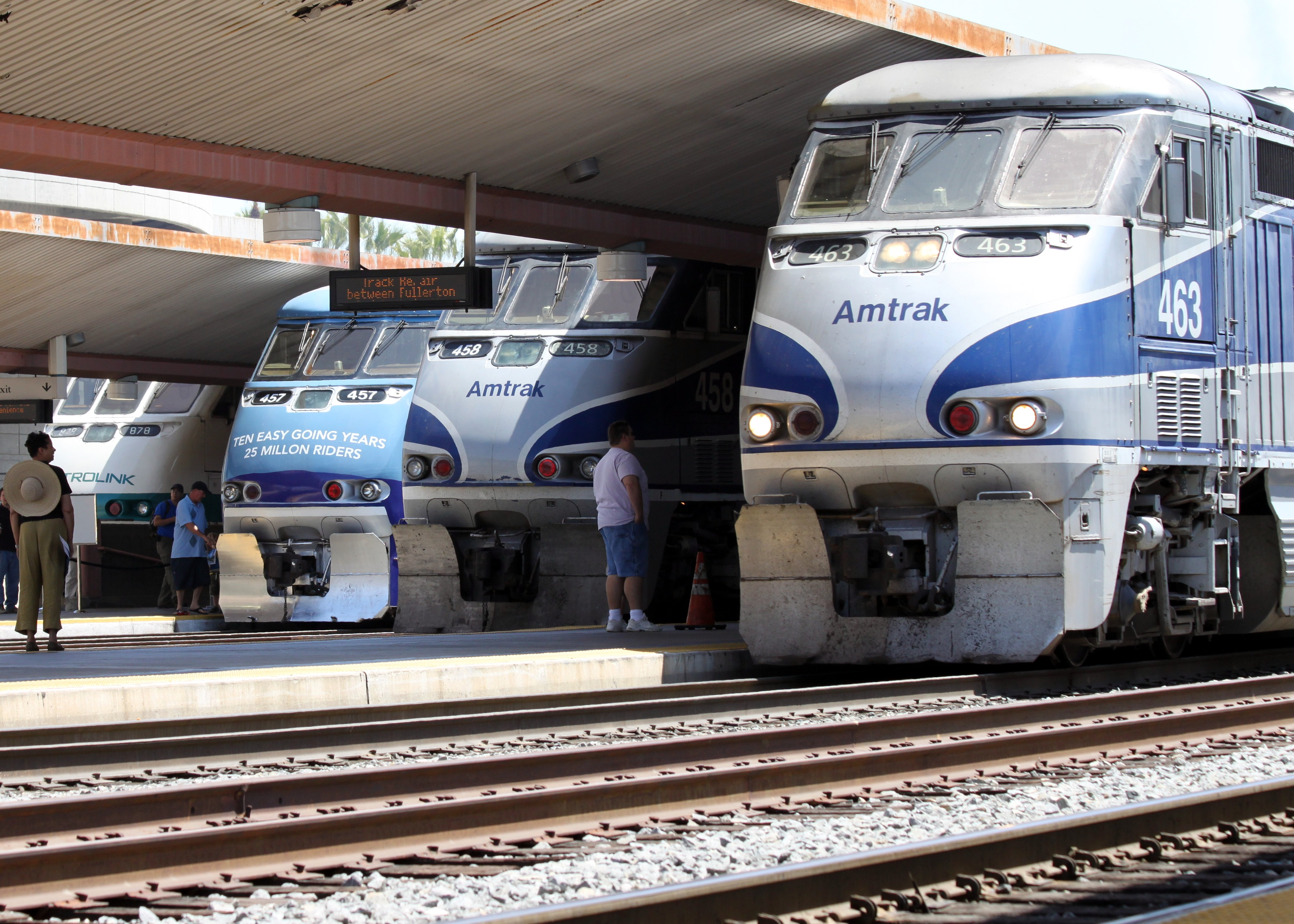
Metrolink and Amtrak trains at Union Station

=== Amtrak ===
==== Amtrak long-distance routes ====
Union Station is the western terminus for four of Amtrak's long-distance trains:

- Coast Starlight, to Seattle (daily, service began 1971)
- Southwest Chief, to Chicago (daily, service began 1939 as Super Chief, renamed Southwest Limited in 1974 and Southwest Chief in 1984)
- Sunset Limited, to New Orleans (tri-weekly, service began 1939)
- Texas Eagle, to Chicago (tri-weekly, service began 1982): Runs combined with the Sunset Limited to San Antonio, where the train is split.

==== Amtrak California regional routes ====
Amtrak California operates multiple-times-daily regional rail services to cities across the state:

- Pacific Surfliner, from San Diego to San Luis Obispo via Los Angeles (service began 1939 as San Diegan, renamed Pacific Surfliner in 2000): 13 daily round trips, most of which originate and terminate here; three run to Goleta and two run to San Luis Obispo.
- Connections to the Gold Runner to Oakland or Sacramento are provided through Amtrak Thruway services. (see below)

=== Metrolink ===
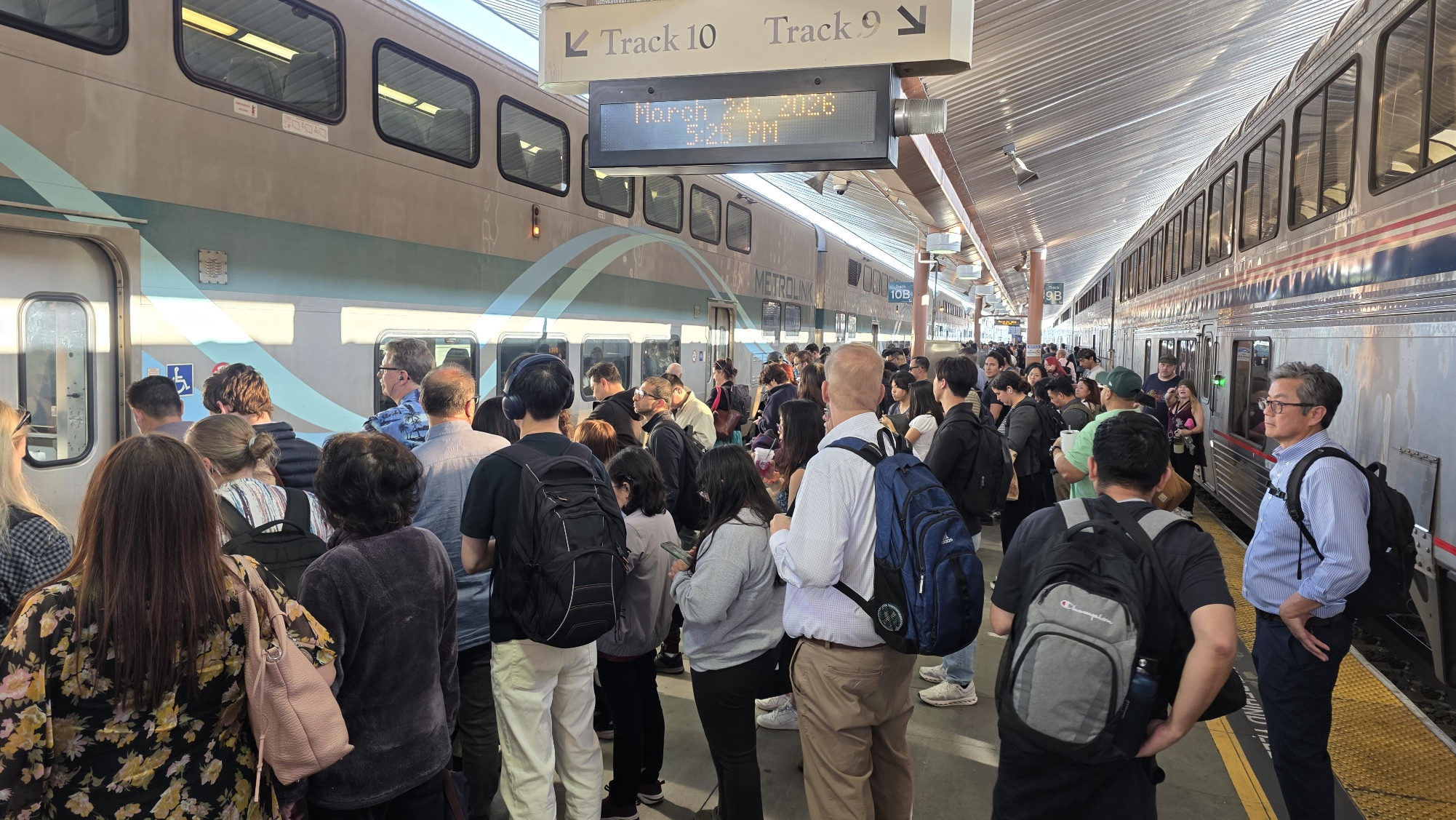
Passengers on the platform

The station is the hub for Metrolink and six of Metrolink's eight lines serve the station:

- Antelope Valley Line, to Lancaster (service began 1992)
- Riverside Line, to Riverside (service began 1993)
- Orange County Line, to Oceanside (service began 1990 as the Amtrak Orange County Commuter)
- San Bernardino Line, to San Bernardino (service began 1992)
- Ventura County Line, to Ventura (service began 1992)
- 91/Perris Valley Line, to Perris (service began 2002)

=== Metro Rail ===
Three Metro Rail lines serve the station with about 300 Metro Rail trains departing every weekday. The B and D lines are heavy rail, and share a platform underground, while the A Line uses tracks one and two outside.

==== Metro Rail B and D lines ====
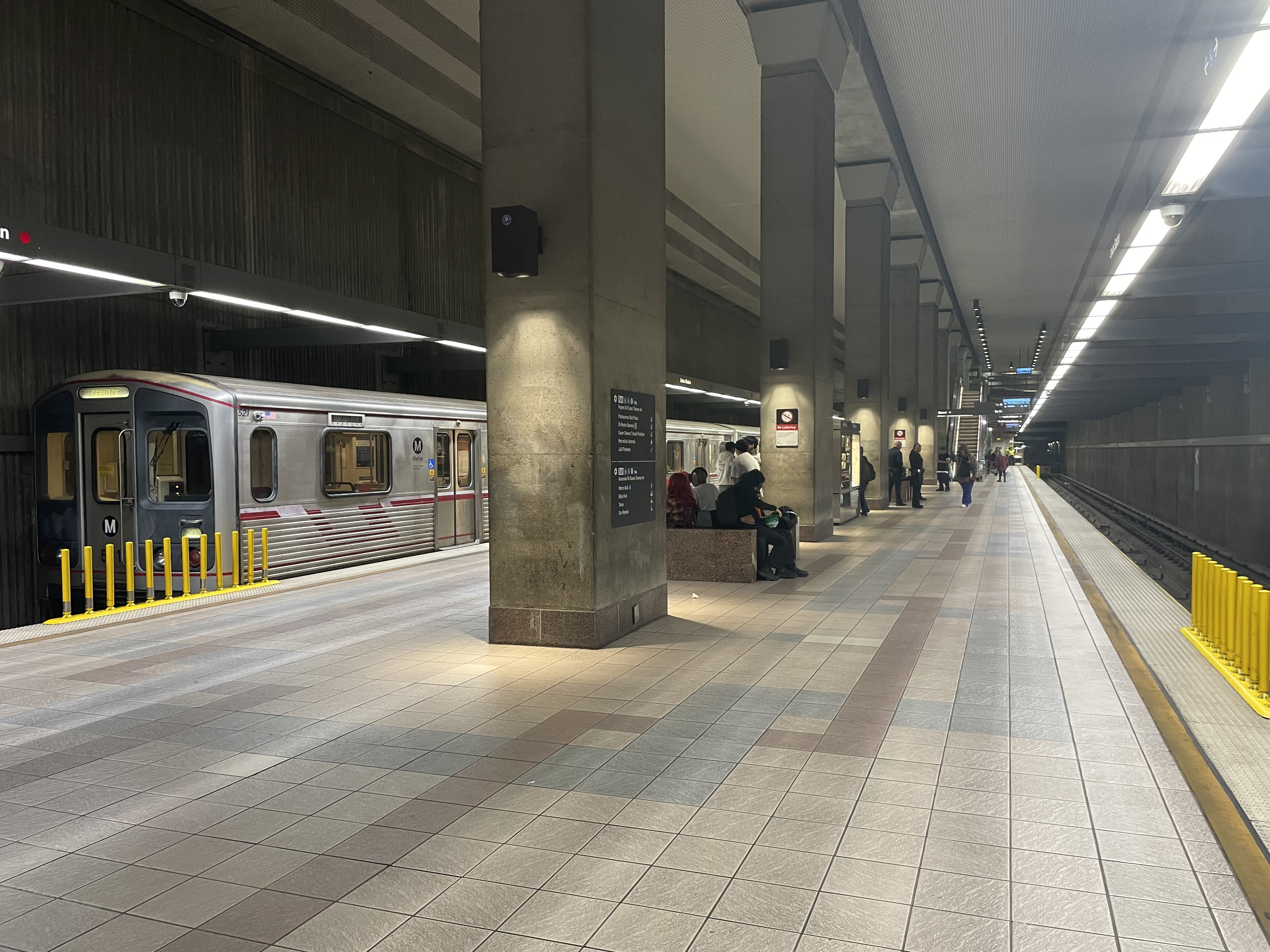
The Metro Rail B and D line platform

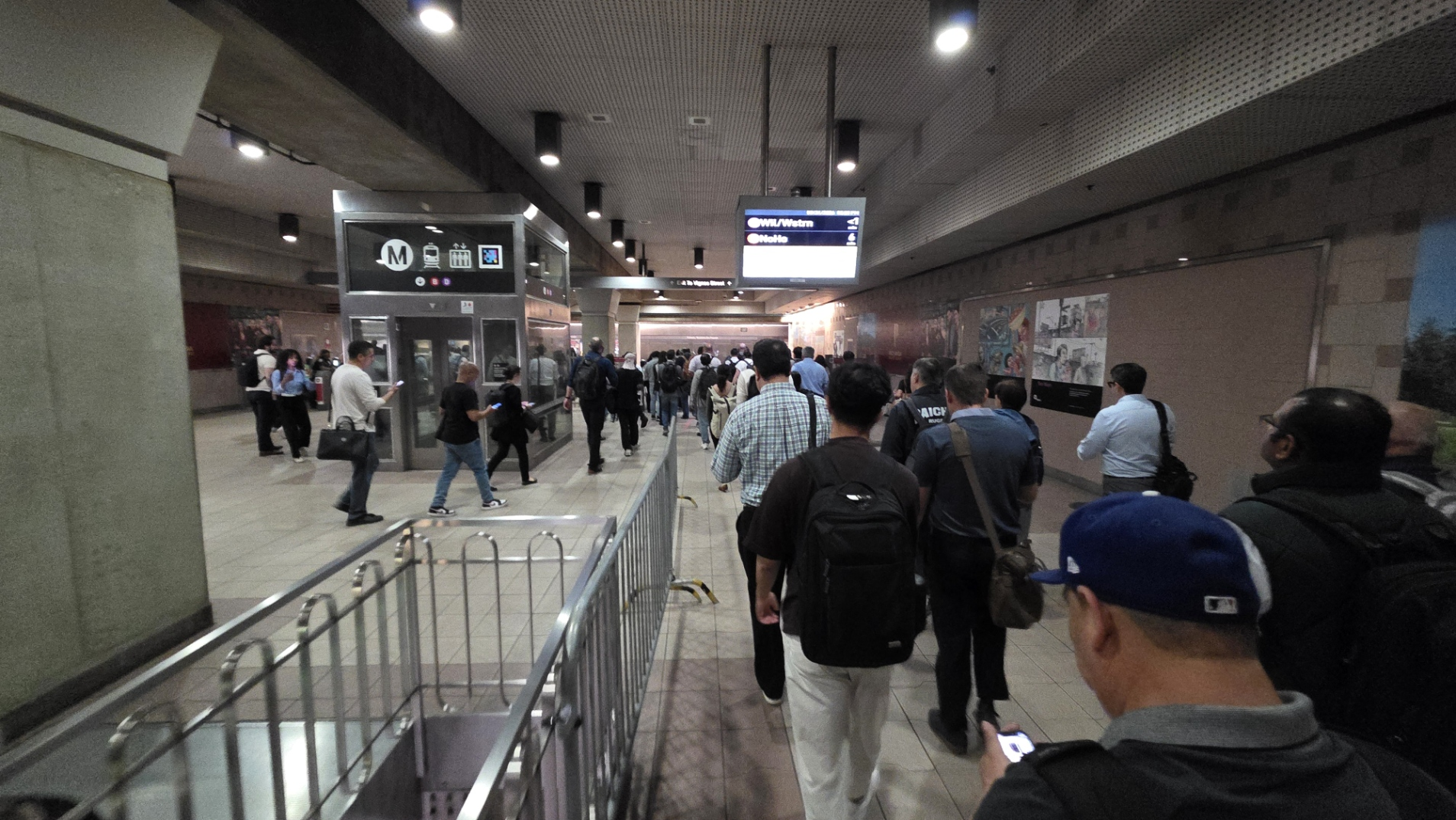
Vignes Exit during rush hour

The Metro Rail B and D subway lines have their eastern terminus at Union Station and share two tracks below Union Station. There are two entrances to the platform: one is located inside Union Station's main concourse on the west side of the complex, near Alameda Street, and the other is located near the Patsaouras Transit Plaza on the east side of the complex.

==== Metro Rail A Line ====
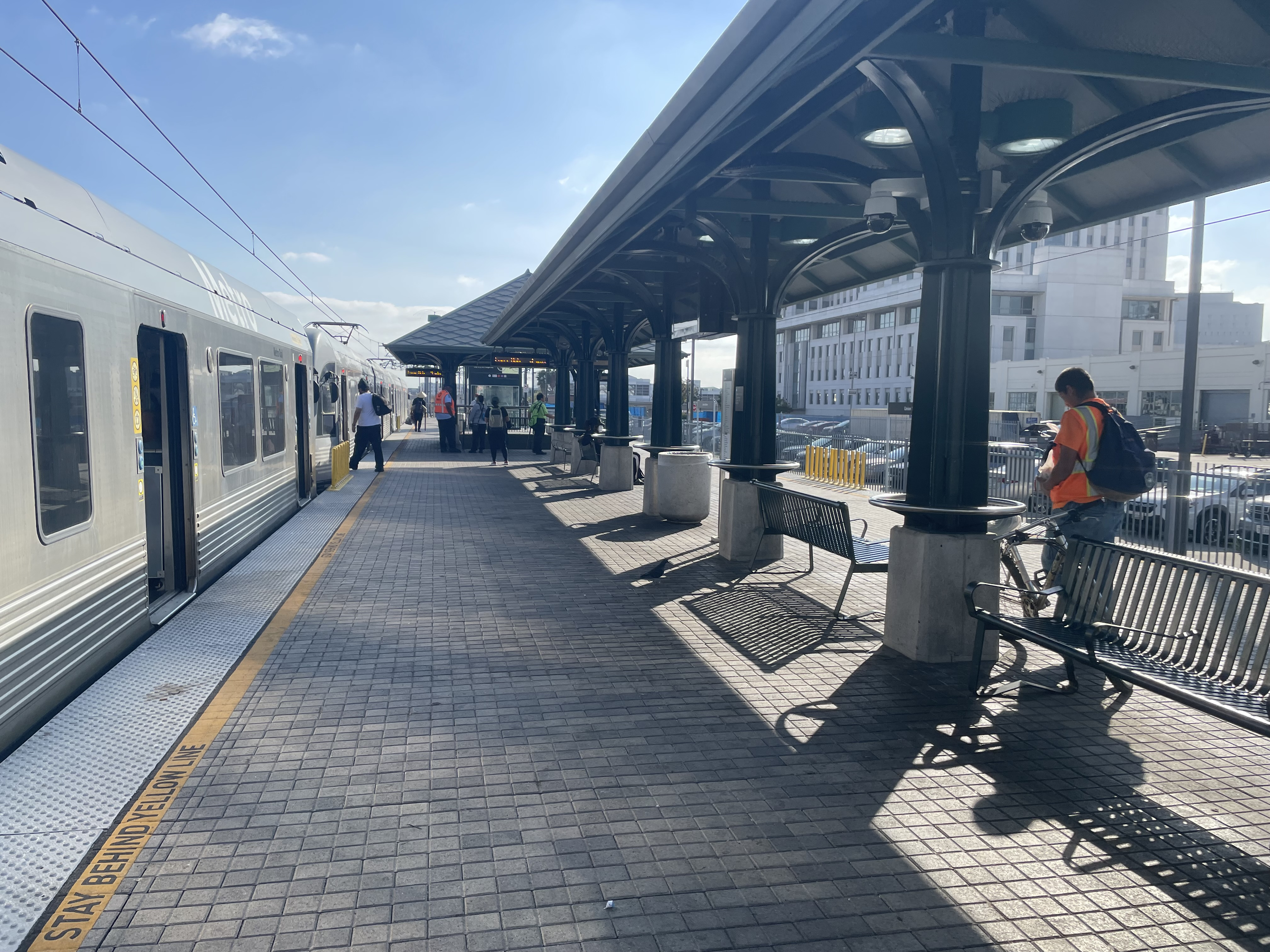
The Metro Rail A Line platform

The Metro Rail A Line is a light rail line that passes through Union Station as it travels between Pomona and Long Beach. Trains use Tracks 1 and 2 of Union Station's 14 outdoor tracks. The platform is accessible via staircase and elevator from the main passenger tunnel. From the Gold line's opening on July 26, 2003, until the segment to East Los Angeles opened on November 15, 2009, this station was the southern terminus. The platform features an art installation, entitled Images of Commonality/Nature and Movement, created by Beth Thielen.

The platform station was formerly served by the L Line, which permanently closed on June 16, 2023, for the opening of the Regional Connector. The A Line now services the tracks north of Little Tokyo/Arts District, including Union Station.

=== Metro Busway ===
==== Metro J Line ====
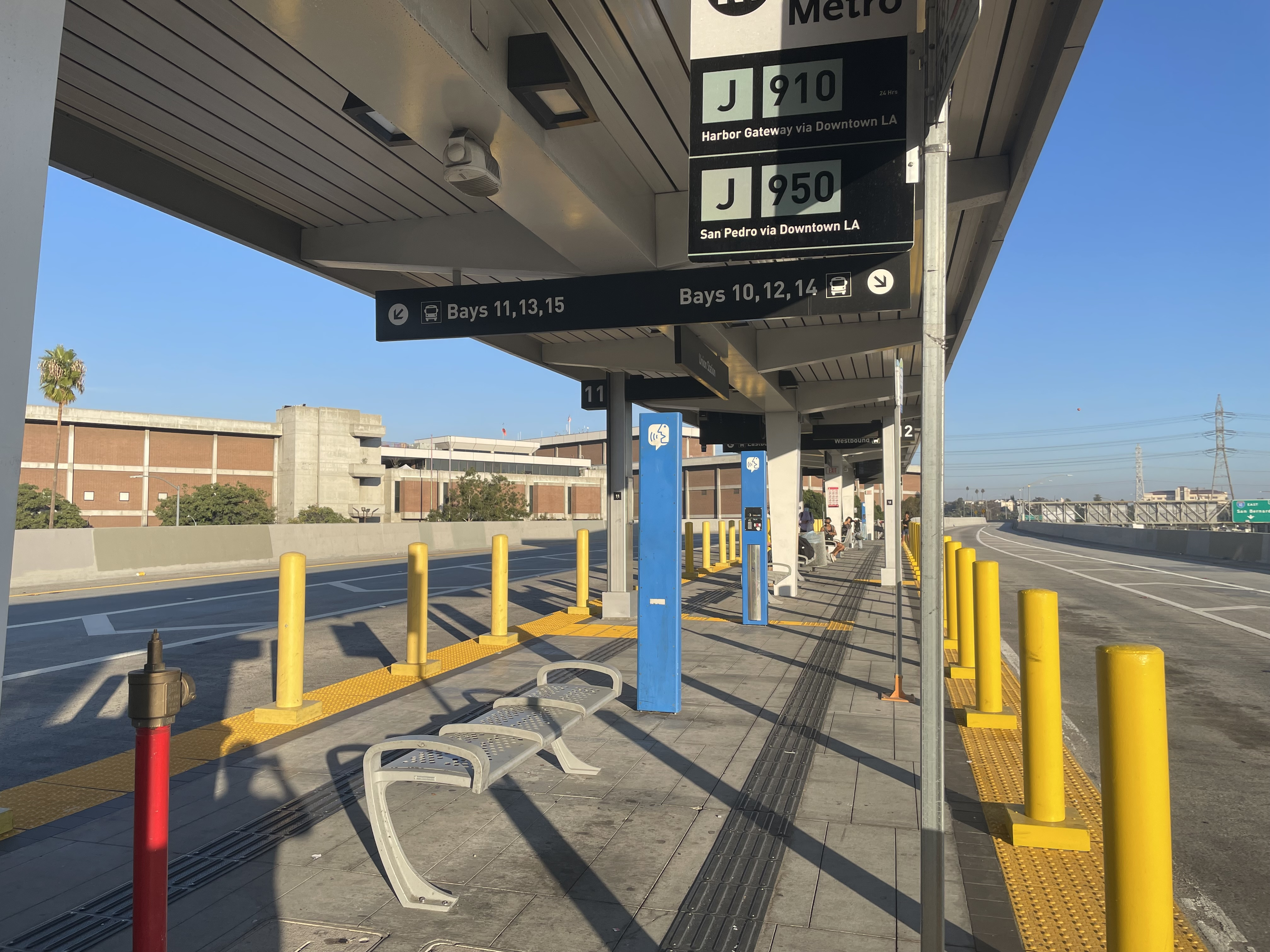
El Monte Busway platform

One Metro Busway bus rapid transit line makes a stop at the Patsaouras Transit Plaza. The Metro Busway J Line operates between El Monte station, Downtown Los Angeles, Harbor Gateway Transit Center and select trips to San Pedro using the El Monte Busway and Harbor Transitway.

=== Silver Streak ===
The Silver Streak, a bus rapid transit service operated by Foothill Transit running between Pico station in Downtown Los Angeles and the Montclair Transit Center, makes a stop at the Patsaouras Transit Plaza.

=== Bus and coach services ===
==== Long-distance motorcoach ====
===== Amtrak Thruway =====
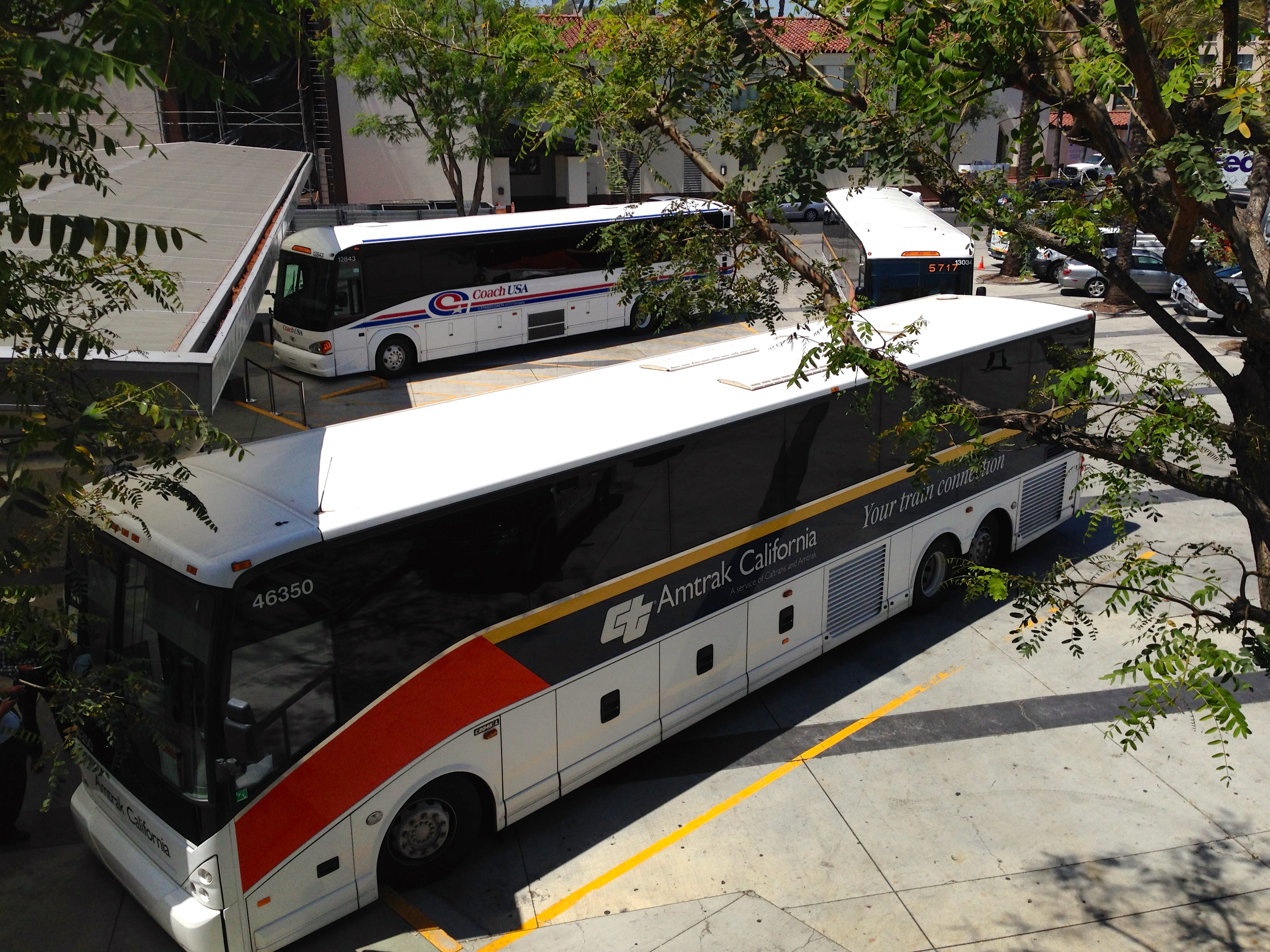
Buses at the Amtrak Thruway boarding area of Los Angeles Union Station.

Amtrak California operates several motorcoach routes under the Amtrak Thruway brand from Union Station using dedicated bus bays at the north side of the station, not at Patsaouras Transit Plaza.

Connections to Gold Runner trains are provided through bus route 1 that travel to/from the Bakersfield Amtrak Station. Direct rail service to Bakersfield is not possible because passenger trains are not normally allowed on the Tehachapi Loop near Bakersfield. When trains are not running during the overnight hours several bus routes provide service along the Pacific Surfliner route (to Santa Barbara, San Diego and select intermediate stations) and the Gold Runner route (to Fresno and select intermediate stations.):

- Route 1: Bakersfield – Los Angeles – Santa Ana – San Diego

===== Flixbus =====
While it does not stop on the Union Station property, Flixbus provides intercity service to destinations across the Western United States from a parking lot across the street from the station on the northwest corner of Cesar Chavez Avenue and Vignes Street.

===== Greyhound =====
Greyhound Lines operates its main Los Angeles station from the Patsaouras Transit Plaza. The station opened on October 19, 2022, replacing a station located at 7th and Alameda in the Arts District.

==== Metro and municipal buses ====
Bus services using the Patsaouras Transit Plaza:

- Los Angeles Metro Bus: 30, 33, 40
- Antelope Valley Transit Authority: 785*
- City of Commerce Transit: 600
- City of Santa Clarita Transit: 794*
- LAX FlyAway
- LADOT Commuter Express: Bunker Hill Shuttle*, 431*, 438*, 448*, 534*
- LADOT DASH: D
- Mount St. Mary's College Shuttle*
- University of Southern California Shuttles: UPC, HSC, ICS

Bus services using the Union Station Patsaouras Bus Plaza station, which is located in the median of the El Monte Busway next to US-101:

- Los Angeles Metro Busway: J Line
- Los Angeles Metro Bus: Express 487, Express 489*
- Foothill Transit: Silver Streak, 490*, 493*, 495*, 497*, 498*, 499*, 699*

Bus services using the bus stop on Cesar Chavez Avenue & Vignes Street (northeast corner of station):

- Los Angeles Metro Bus: 28, 70, 78
- LADOT DASH: Lincoln Heights/Chinatown

Bus services using the bus stop on Alameda Street & Los Angeles Street (outside western entrance):

- Los Angeles Metro Bus: 76
- Big Blue Bus: Rapid 10*
- LADOT DASH: B
- Torrance Transit: 4X*

Bus service using the bus stop on the west side of Union Station (near the taxi stand and the Mozaic Apartments):

- Dodger Stadium Express (home games during baseball season only)
- Los Angeles Metro Buses to the Dodger Stadium for a 90-minute pre-game from Los Angeles Union Station and return to Los Angeles Union Station from Dodger Stadium after the game; Los Angeles Dodgers is Boys in Blue.

* Indicates commuter service that operates only during weekday rush hours.

== Future expansion ==
=== Link Union Station ===
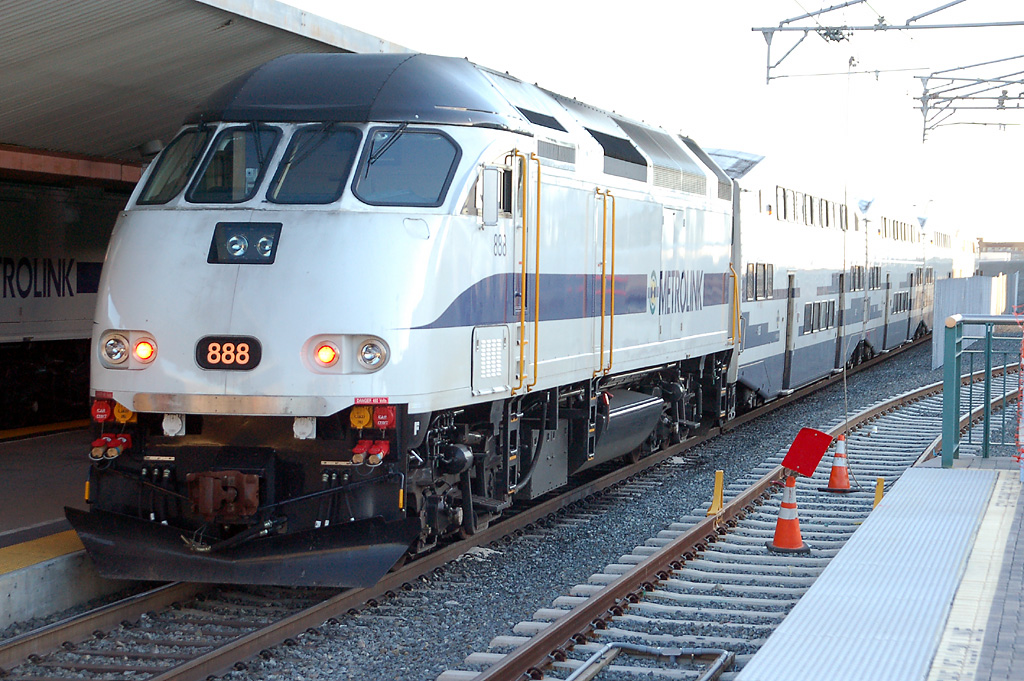
A Metrolink train at Union Station

With the number of trains using Union Station expanding, the stub-end layout of trackage is limiting the station's capacity. Trains can only enter or exit from the north side of the station. The configuration forces trains without cab-cars to slowly reverse in or out of the station and trains heading to or from the south to make a near-180 degree turn. Compounding the problem, is that while the station has 14 boarding tracks, multiple trains must squeeze onto just 5 tracks.

Originally, there were more tracks at "the throat", but Metrolink had some removed to allow for faster speeds along the curves in and out of the station to improve efficiency as they enter or exit the station. This choke-point can delay arriving trains as they are forced to wait outside of the station to allow a departing train to exit the station. Departures are usually given priority, to free up platforms and to keep them from experiencing delays along their route.

Therefore, Metro has proposed the Link Union Station (Link US, formerly named Southern California Regional Interconnector) Project, which would extend tracks 3–10 as run-through tracks, which will exit Union Station and cross over the El Monte Busway and US Route 101/Santa Ana Fwy on a long, elevated "S-curve" that will tie into the existing tracks along the Los Angeles River. The plan also includes tracks along the river that would create a "loop" around the station allowing all trains (including those to/from the north or west) to use the run-though tracks.

Metro authorized preliminary engineering for the project in July 2012. A Request For Proposals (RFP) for Link Union Station was being prepared as of June 2013. The $31-million contract for the engineering work on the project was approved on April 24, 2014. The project's estimated value is $350 million.

During construction, several tracks may be taken out of service due to their extension. To make up for the temporary loss of those platforms, track 13 was revitalized for use and tracks 14 & 15 were re-constructed. The project was completed on October 17, 2012. Once the Link US project is finished, the run-through tracks and tracks 13–14 will be in regular use (track 15 will be used for storage), resulting in a 40% increase in track capacity.

On July 27, 2019, the Metro board officially approved and certified the Final Environmental Impact Report (FEIR) for the Link US Union Station run-through tracks project. The FIER has an expanded central concourse hallway to replace the new elevated concourse proposed in the Draft EIR, and also eliminated the loop tracks. These modifications reduced project costs while prioritizing rider convenience while transferring between trains. A funding plan for the project was approved on April 21, 2020, with the project's Phase A completion targeted for 2028.

In 2021, this project began construction, causing partial closure of platforms at this station. As of October 2023, Metro estimates that the first phase of the project will open in 2028.

==== Former run-through tracks project ====
Caltrans and the Federal Railroad Administration previously drafted a plan to create run-through tracks at Union Station, but the project involved just four tracks and lacked the station "loop" limiting usage of the tracks just to trains heading to or from the south.

The final environmental impact report for the "Los Angeles Union Station Run-Through Tracks Project" was published by the FRA in November 2005.

=== California High-Speed Rail ===
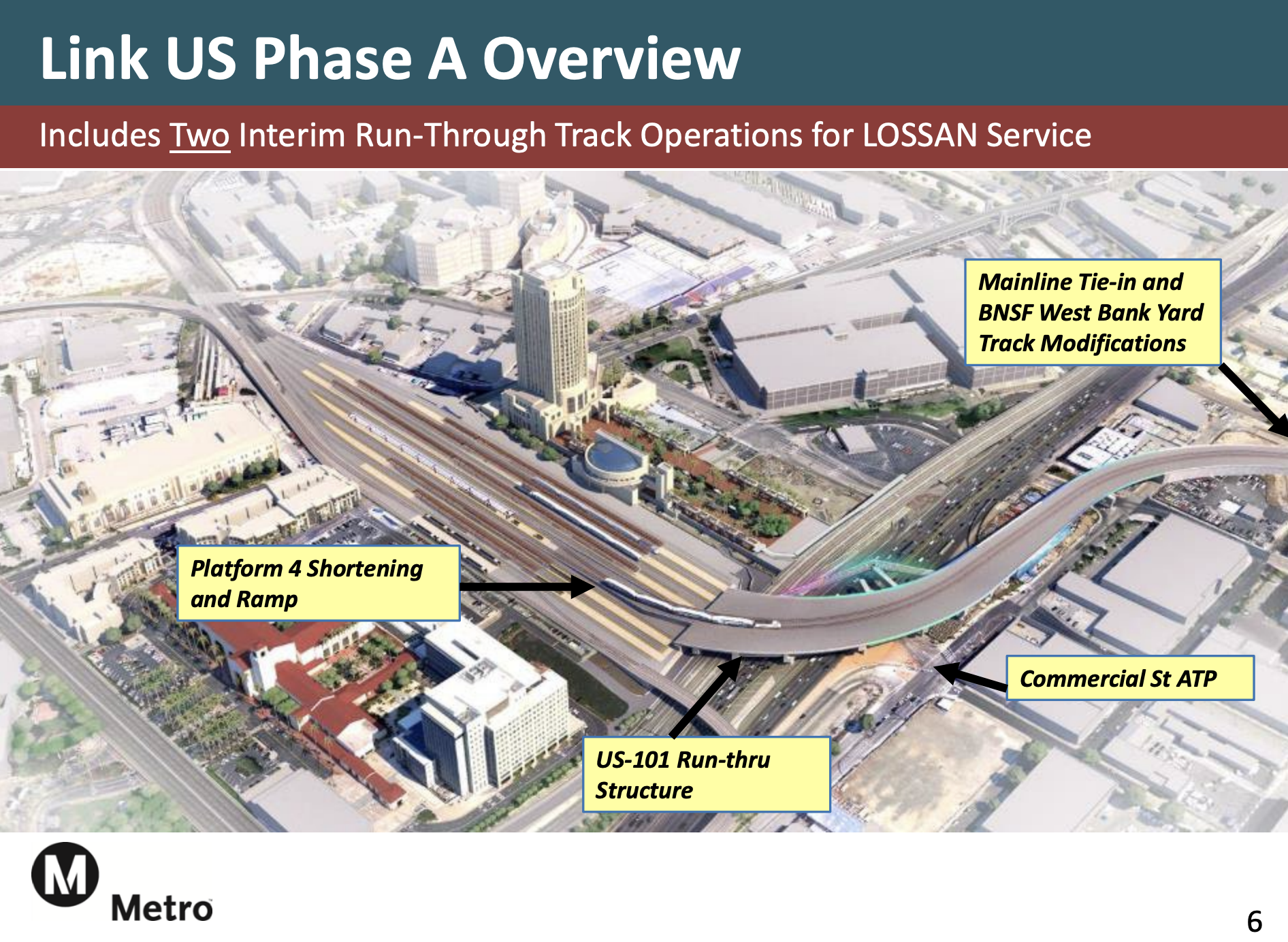
A slide from a LINK US Project Update on June 29, 2023, depicting the planned track run-through at LA Union Station

Union Station is planned to be a major hub for the future California High-Speed Rail System. Upon completion, it is projected that passengers will be able to get from Union Station to the Salesforce Transit Center in the city of San Francisco in 2 hours and 40 minutes.

As a part of its Master Plan, Metro studied how to best integrate tracks and platforms for high-speed trains arrival into Union Station. Options included an aerial structure above the existing platforms, an underground structure under Alameda Street, an underground structure under Vignes Street and an aerial structure east of Vignes. All plans include a new concourse for high-speed rail passengers and three platforms with six tracks.

Since that time, the Link US project has resulted in changes to how High-Speed Rail (HSR) will be brought into Union Station. That project's Final Environmental Report (FEIR) released in June 2019 indicates that HSR will approach the station from the north, on tracks 3 thru 6, use rebuilt station platforms 2 and 3, then exit to the south onto a new viaduct over the El Monte Busway and Santa Ana Freeway, which curves east (over a rebuilt and relocated Commercial Street) to return to the existing rail corridor along the west bank of the Los Angeles River. Thus, only four tracks and two platforms at Union Station will be used for HSR, with the remaining six tracks being converted to thru status and using the new viaduct to be shared by Metrolink and Amtrak lines. Tracks 13 thru 15 will remain stubs, ending at the south side of the station.

Construction on the run-through track is expected to start between 2023 and 2025 with a planned completion between 2028 and 2033.

=== Southeast Gateway Line ===
Metro selected Union Station as the eventual northern terminus of the planned Southeast Gateway Line in 2022. The new light rail line will serve new platforms either at the Forecourt or behind the Metropolitan Water District Building and may open as early as 2043.

=== Dodger Stadium gondola ===
The Los Angeles Aerial Rapid Transit Project is a proposed aerial gondola connecting the station to Dodger Stadium.

=== Brightline West ===
The proposed Brightline West high speed line is scheduled to begin construction between Las Vegas and Rancho Cucamonga in late 2023 and is expected to be operational in mid-late 2027. It is planned to connect to Los Angeles Union Station via existing Metrolink services, though Metrolink schedules will line up with Brightline schedules to allow for transfers.

=== Dreamstar Lines ===
Dreamstar Lines intends to launch an overnight passenger train service from Union Station to San Francisco 4th and King Street station.

== In popular culture ==
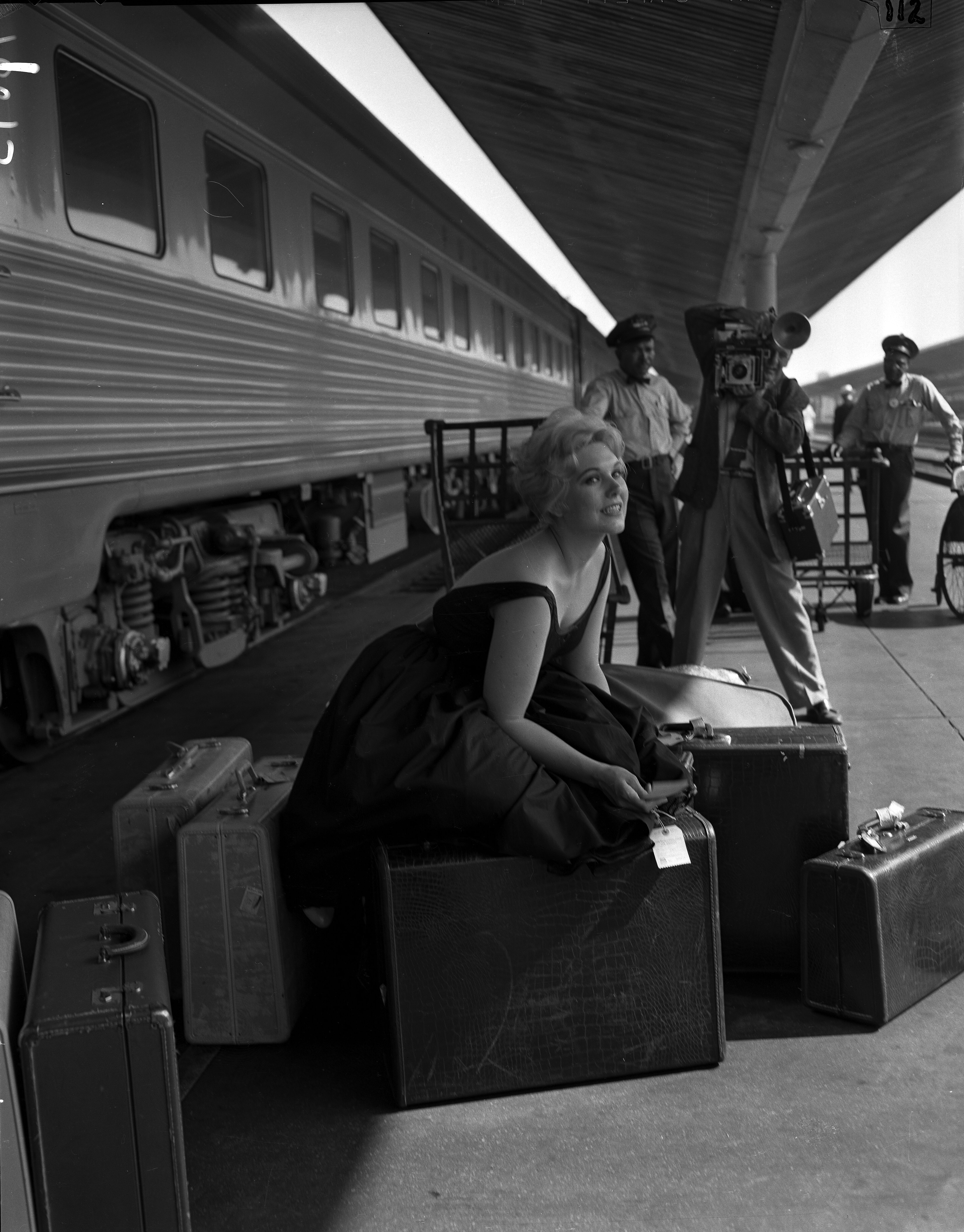
Actress Kim Novak at Union Station (1956)

The facility served as a backdrop for the 1950 film Union Station, which starred William Holden and Nancy Olson. It has since been used in numerous films as a filming location, typically as a stand in for other fictional locations, including:

- Blade Runner (as a police station)
- Dead Men Don't Wear Plaid
- Drag Me to Hell
- Gable and Lombard
- Bugsy
- Nick of Time
- Pearl Harbor
- Chandler
- In the Mood
- Private Eye (1987 TV movie starring Josh Brolin)
- Silver Streak
- The Way We Were
- Trancers II: The Return of Jack Deth
- Under the Rainbow
- To Live and Die in L.A.
- Muppets Most Wanted
- The Island
- The Italian Job
- Cry Danger
- Can't Hardly Wait
- Union Station
- Garfield: The Movie
- Chaka Khan's Through the Fire Music Video
- The Dark Knight Rises (as Gotham City kangaroo court)

Union Station has been featured in numerous television shows, such as Adam-12, 24, Agents of S.H.I.E.L.D., and Euphoria.

It has also been featured in video games; Union Station, as it was in the late 1940s, appears in L.A. Noire, while a smaller fictionalized version of the station appears in Grand Theft Auto: San Andreas as Unity Station.

Union Station was featured in Visiting... with Huell Howser Episode 222.

The music videos of Lifehouse's "You and Me", Backstreet Boys' "Chances", Fiona Apple's "Paper Bag," "Drops of Jupiter" by American band Train, directed by Nigel Dick; and "Last Train Home" by John Mayer, directed by Cameron Duddy; were filmed in Union Station. A significant portion of the music video for "Vermilion" by the band Slipknot was filmed within Union Station.

== See also ==
- List of Registered Historic Places in Los Angeles
- Los Angeles Metro Rail rolling stock
- Martin F. Betkouski, City Council member accused of profiting from land transactions in the area before Union Station was built
