= Patsaouras Transit Plaza =

Bus station in Los Angeles Union Station

Union Station Patsaouras Transit Plaza
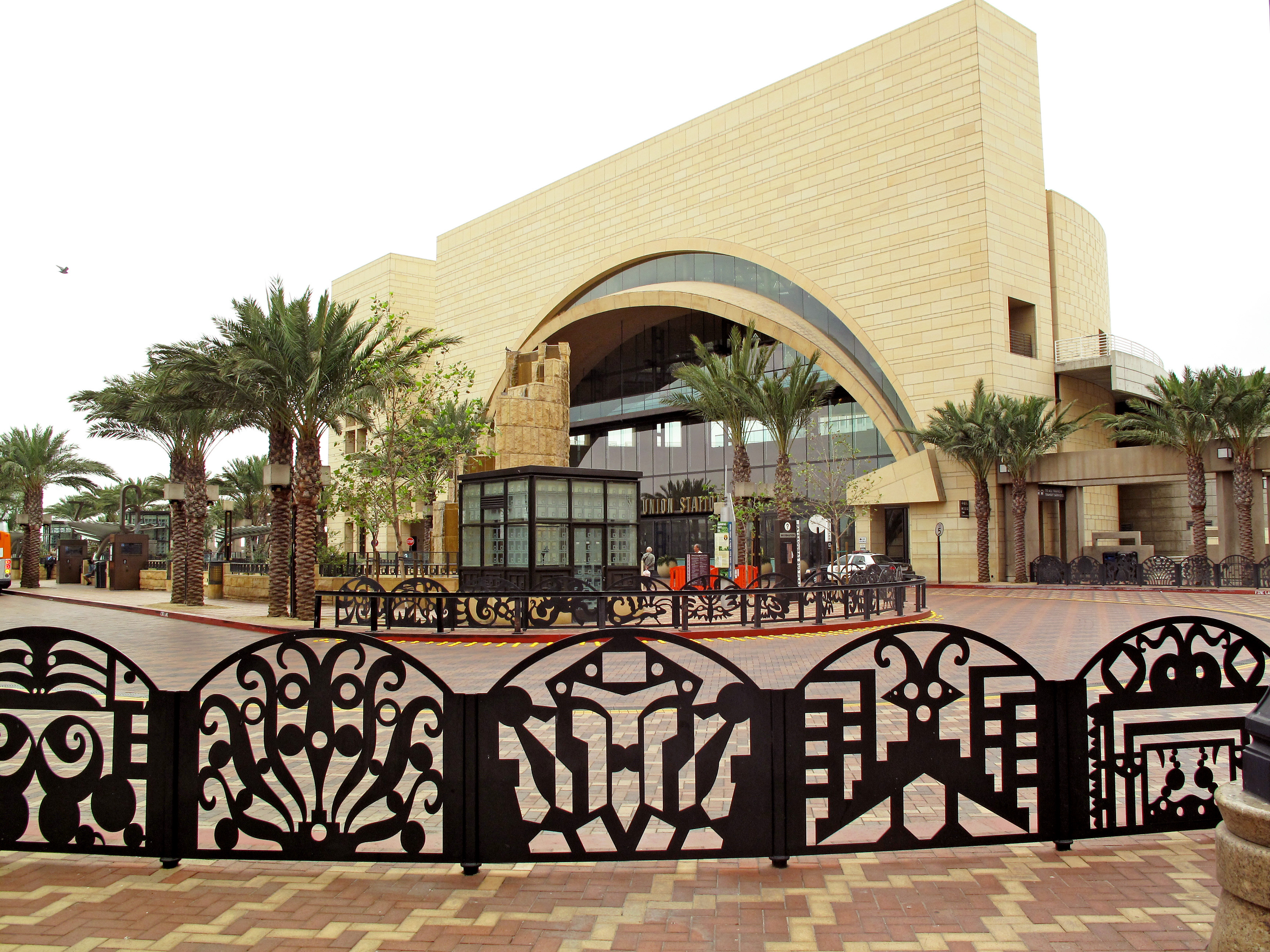
- The transit plaza and Union Station east portal

General information
- Location: 801 North Vignes Street; Los Angeles, California; United States
- Coordinates: 34°03′19″N 118°13′59″W
- Owner: Los Angeles Metro
- Platforms: 2 multi-bay island platforms
- Bus stands: 15
- Connections: Union Station

Construction
- Platform levels: 3
- Parking: 3,000 spaces (paid)
- Cycle facilities: Metro Bike Share station, racks and lockers
- Accessible: Yes
- Architect: Gensler

History
- Opened: October 24, 1995
Location

Patsaouras Transit Plaza is a bus station hub on the east side of Union Station in Downtown Los Angeles, near the El Monte Busway. It was originally named the Gateway Transit Plaza but was renamed after Nick Patsaouras, former Rapid Transit District board member who was an advocate for public transportation.

The Metro Headquarters Building is located at the northern end of the plaza.

== Services ==
=== Metro and municipal buses ===
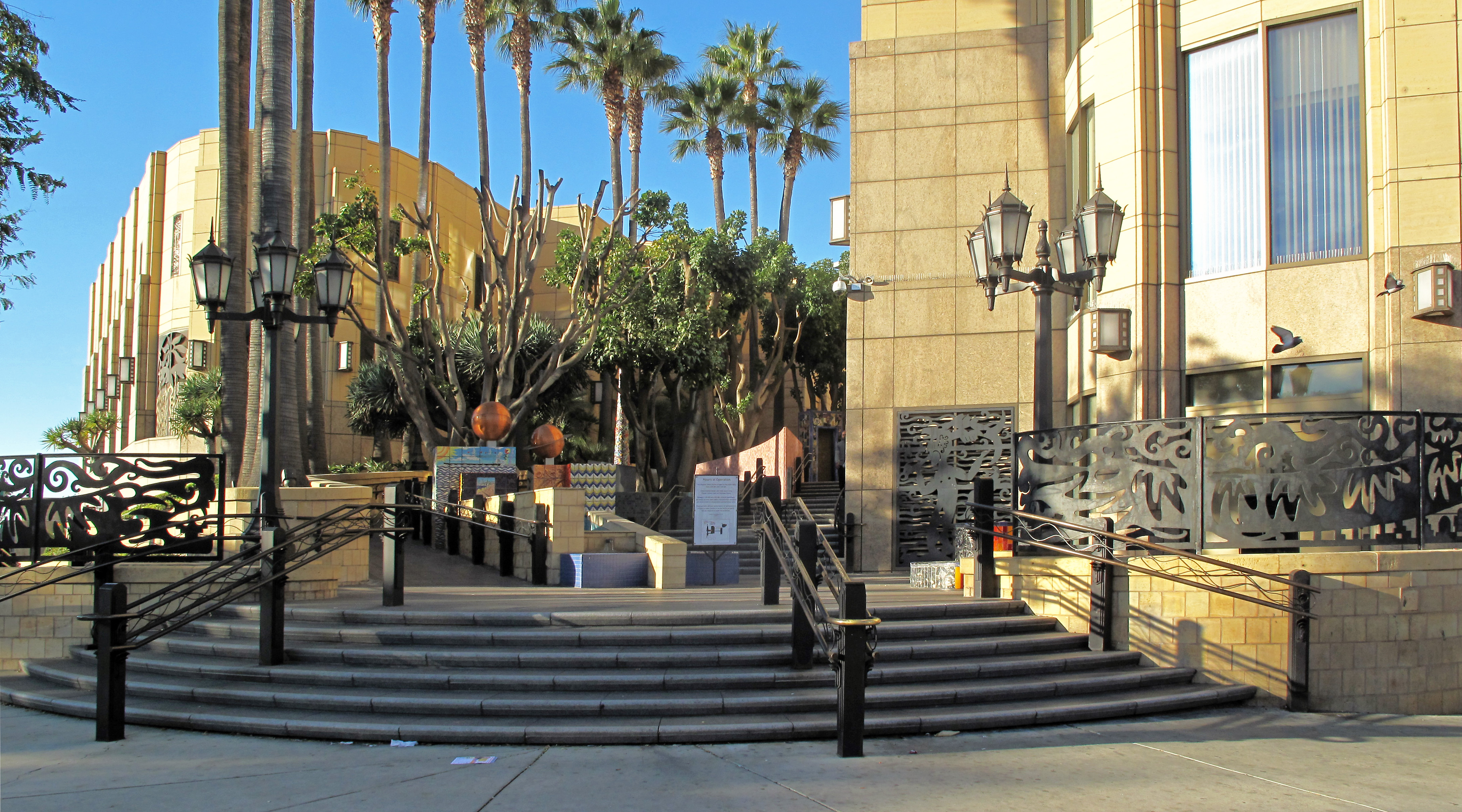
Vignes Street entrance to transit plaza entrance

- Los Angeles Metro Bus
- Antelope Valley Transit Authority
- City of Commerce Transit
- City of Santa Clarita Transit
- Foothill Transit
- Hollywood Bowl shuttle
- LADOT Commuter Express
- LADOT DASH
- Mount St. Mary's College shuttles
- University of Southern California shuttles

Several other services' bus stops are located in or near the Patsaouras Transit Plaza:

- Big Blue Bus (Santa Monica)
- Greyhound Lines
- J Line
- Torrance Transit

=== LAX FlyAway ===
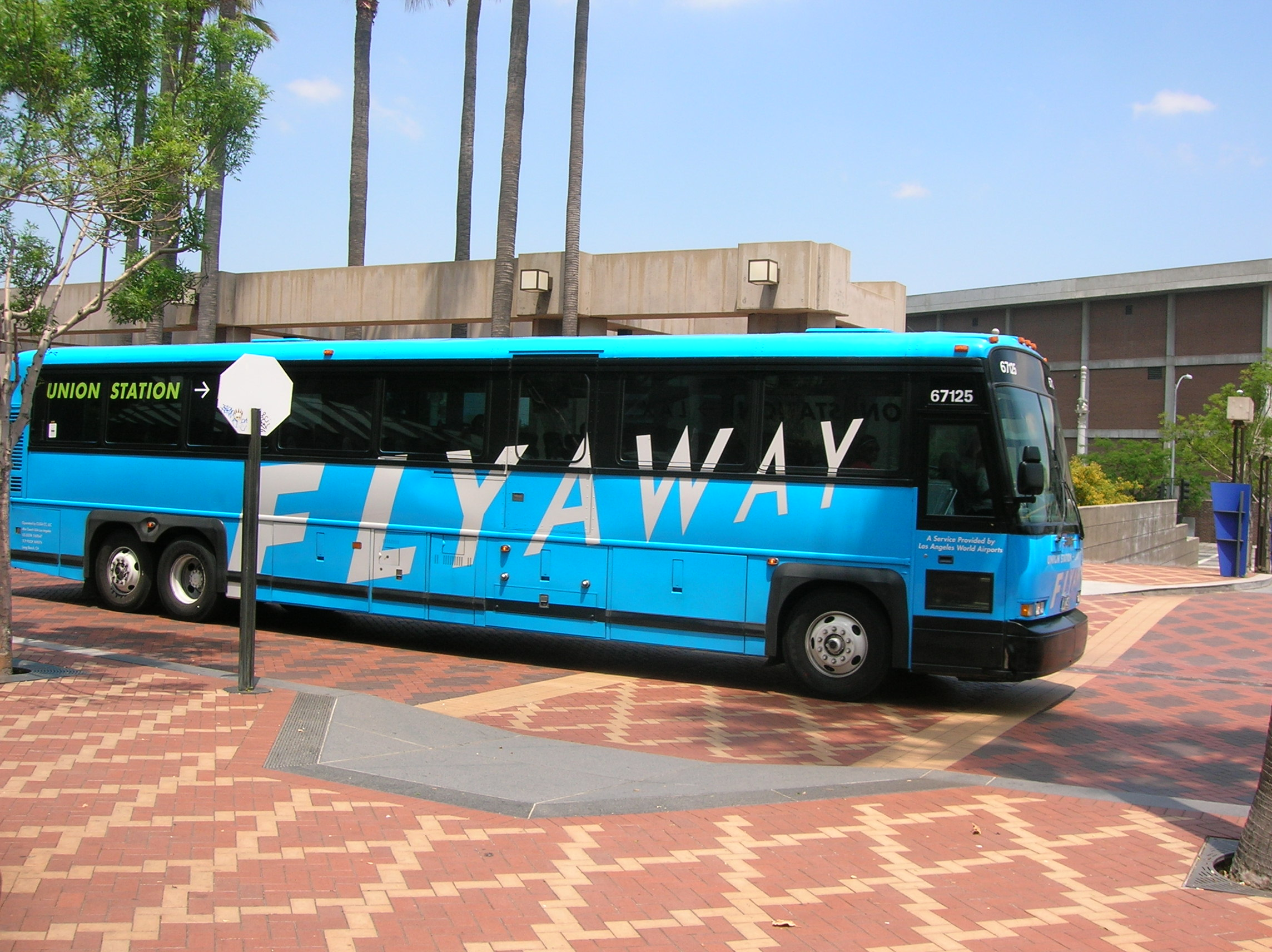
FlyAway coach at the Patsaouras Transit Plaza.

LAX FlyAway service is offered between Union Station and Los Angeles International Airport. FlyAway buses run every 30 minutes between 5 am and 1 am and on the hour between 1 am and 5 am. Tickets are sold from a ticket kiosk at the southwest corner of the island platform. It utilizes bus bay #1.

=== Long-distance motorcoach ===
Amtrak California operates several routes under the Amtrak Thruway brand from dedicated bus bays at the north side of Union Station, near the Subway sandwich shop, not from the Patsaouras Transit Plaza, which is on the other side of the facility.

Greyhound Lines operates from the Patsaouras Transit Plaza. FlixBus boards across the street from Patsaouras, at the Vignes lot located northwest of the intersection of East Cesar Chavez Avenue and North Vignes Street.

== El Monte Busway platform ==
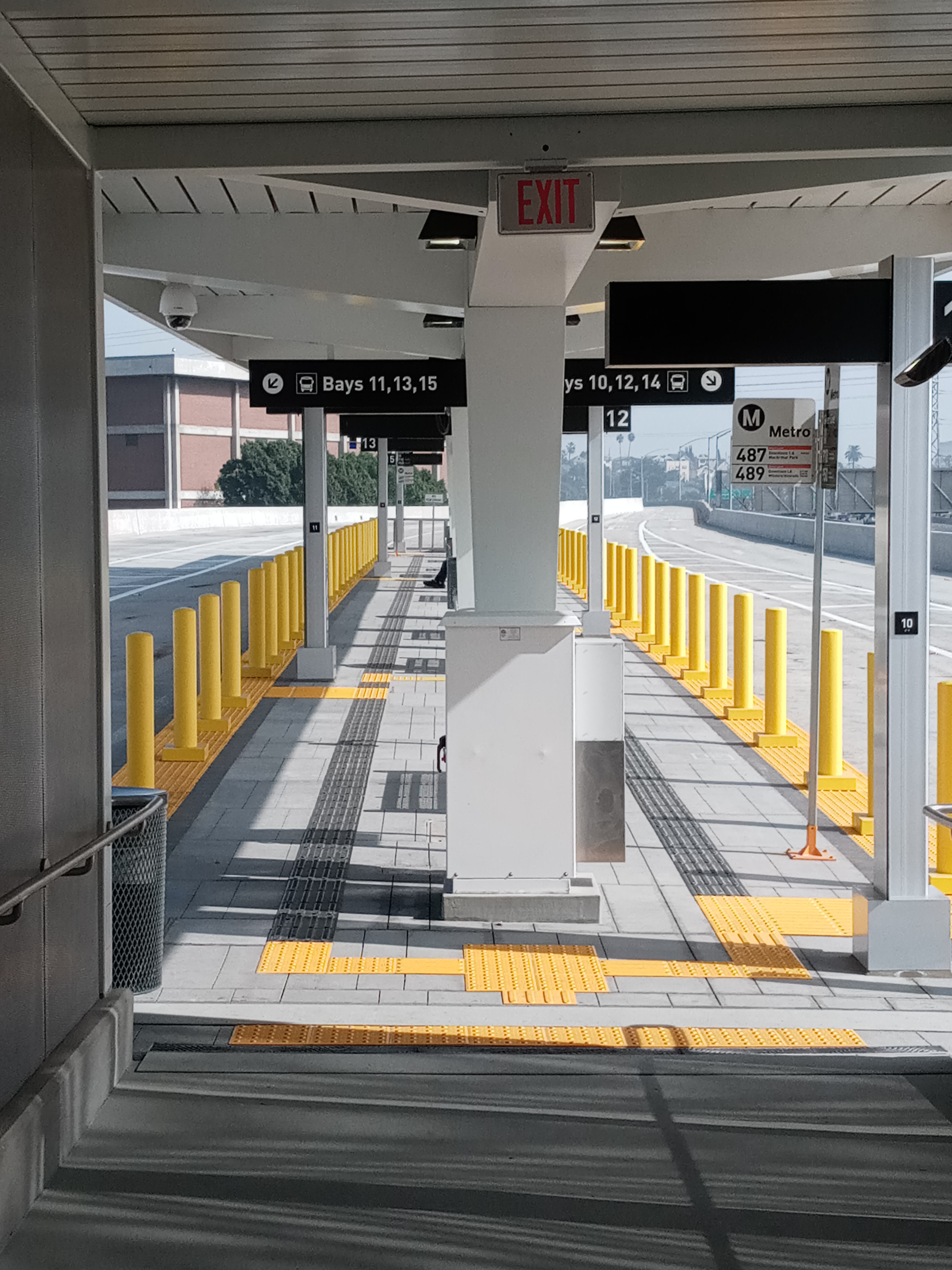
The new transitway station platform opened for service in November 2020

A new transitway station for the J Line, Silver Streak, and other transit buses operating on the El Monte Busway was built south of the Patsaouras Transit Plaza in the median of the El Monte Busway, after years of delays and budget increases.

The station allows buses traveling in both directions on the busway to serve Union Station with a minimum of delay for passengers for other destinations. A bridge allows for passengers to walk directly from the Patsaouras Transit Plaza to the busway station, thereby eliminating a long, convoluted walk across the Union Station property to the former stop located on the El Monte Busway at Alameda.

Construction on the station started in early 2017. Work on the station was halted on April 24, 2018, when archaeological and Native American artifacts were discovered at the site. Archaeological investigation field work was completed nearly a year later on April 12, 2019. Construction resumed in May 2019, with construction completed on November 1, 2020.

The project cost $51 million, well more than double the original estimate. The project was funded by tolls collected as a part of the Metro ExpressLanes project and a grant from the U.S. government.
