= Salt Lake Station =

Los Angeles train station (1891–1924)

Coordinates: 34°02′51.3″N 118°13′45.6″W

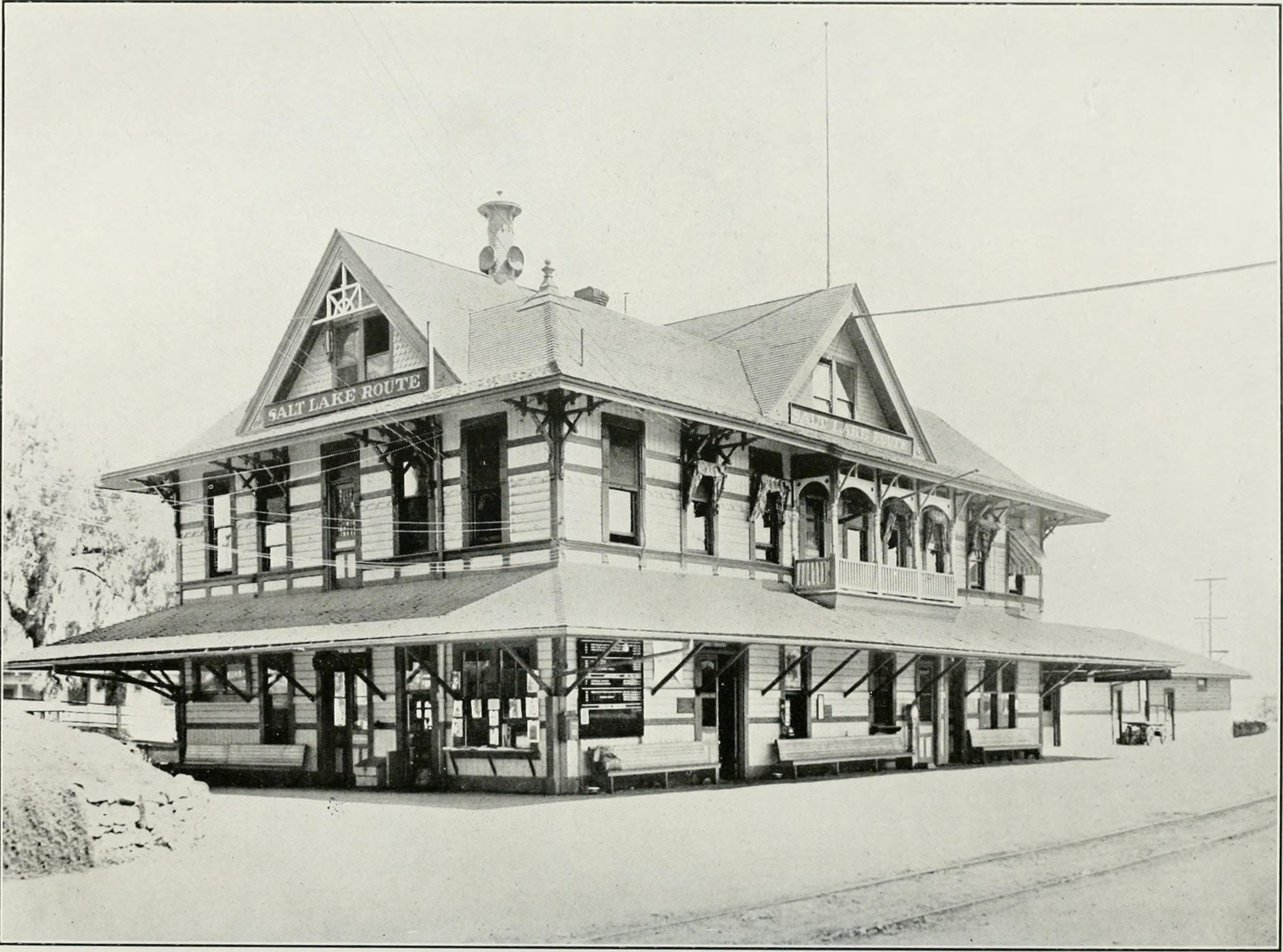
Salt Lake Station, 1920

Salt Lake Station was a railway station in Los Angeles, California. It was located on the east side of the Los Angeles River at 1st Street. It was built by the Los Angeles Terminal Railway and began service in 1891, becoming a part of the Los Angeles and Salt Lake Railroad in 1901 and the Union Pacific Railroad system in 1921. Local streetcar service was provided by the Los Angeles Railway. The building was heavily damaged in a fire in 1924, prompting the railroad to move passenger operations to Southern Pacific's Central Station.

Preceding station	Union Pacific Railroad	Following station
Terminus	Los Angeles and Salt Lake Railroad	Pico toward Salt Lake City
