= Aviation/Century station =

Light rail station in Los Angeles, California

Aviation/Century
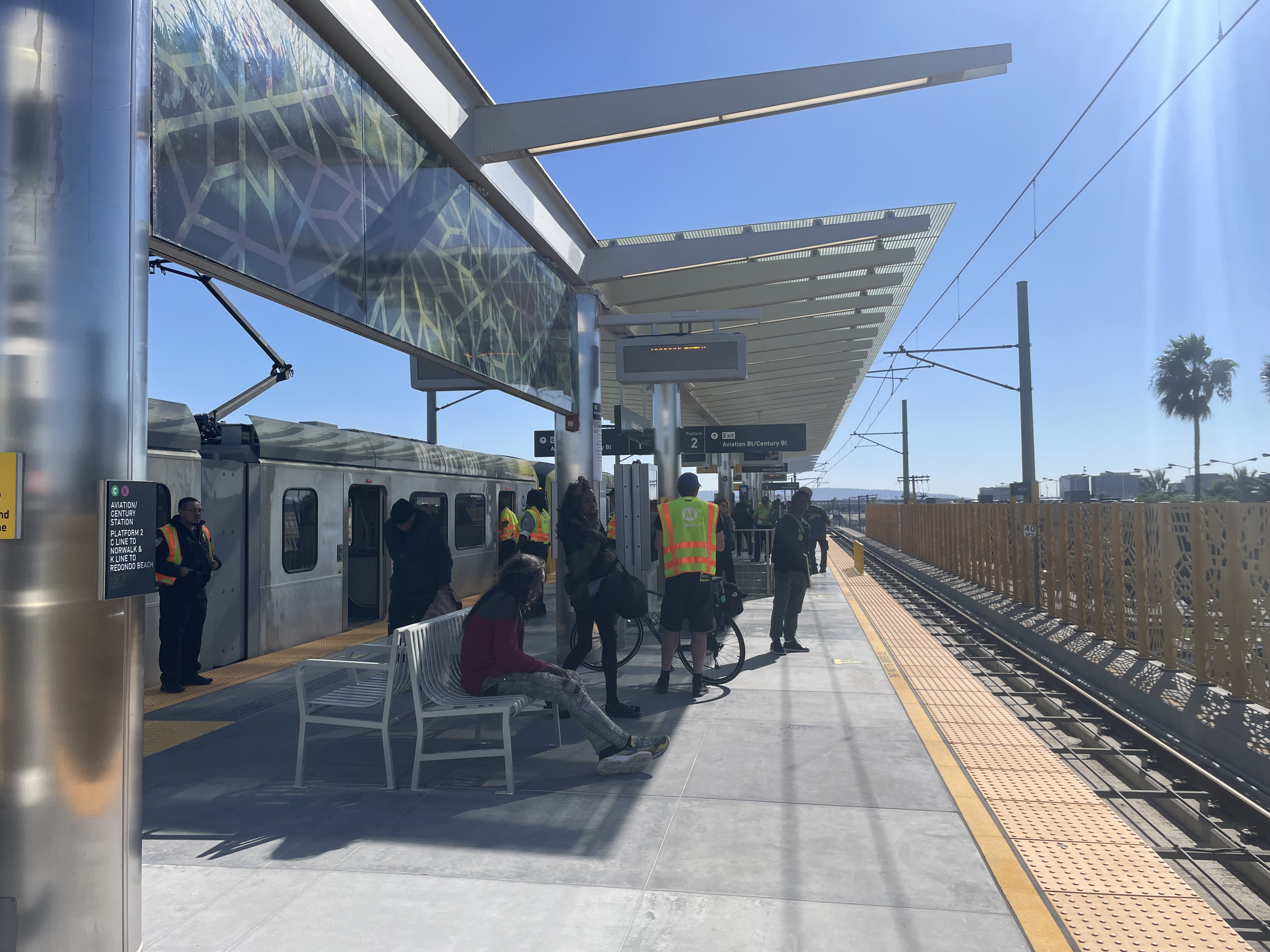
- Aviation/Century station platform on opening day, November 3, 2024

General information
- Location: 5601 Century Boulevard; Los Angeles, California
- Coordinates: 33°56′44″N 118°22′43″W
- Owner: Los Angeles County Metropolitan Transportation Authority
- Platforms: 1 island platform
- Tracks: 2
- Connections: Beach Cities Transit; GTrans; Los Angeles Metro Bus; Metro Micro; Torrance Transit

Construction
- Structure type: Elevated
- Cycle facilities: Racks
- Accessible: Yes

History
- Opened: November 3, 2024

Passengers
- FY 2026: 2,066 (avg. wkdy boardings)

Services
Preceding station	Metro Rail	Following station
LAX/Metro Transit Center Terminus	C Line	Aviation/Imperial toward Norwalk
LAX/Metro Transit Center toward Expo/Crenshaw	K Line	Mariposa toward Redondo Beach
Location

Aviation/Century station is an elevated light rail station on the C and K lines of the Los Angeles Metro Rail system. It is located alongside Aviation Boulevard above its intersection with Century Boulevard, located in the Westchester neighborhood of Los Angeles.

Construction on the station was completed with the rest of the initial line in late 2022, but its opening was delayed to November 3, 2024 due to construction on SkyLink and the LAX/Metro Transit Center. The station opened as part of a service change on the C and K lines in preparation for the opening of the LAX/Metro Transit Center, which opened on June 6, 2025.

The BNSF's Century railroad bridge was demolished on July 25, 2014, to make way for the station.

== Service ==
=== Hours and frequency ===
C Line service hours are approximately from 4:00 a.m. until 12:30 a.m. daily. Trains operate every 10 minutes throughout the day. Night and early morning weekend service is every 20 minutes.

K Line service hours are approximately from 4:30 a.m. until 12:00 a.m. daily. Trains operate every 10 minutes throughout most of the day. Trains run every 20 minutes after 8:00 p.m. every day and before 8:00 a.m. on weekends.

=== Connections ===
As of January 15, 2026, the following connections are available:

- Beach Cities Transit: 109
- GTrans (Gardena): 5
- LADOT Commuter Express: 574
- Los Angeles Metro Bus: 40 (late night only), 117, 120, 232
- Metro Micro: LAX/Inglewood Zone
- Torrance Transit: 8

== Station artwork ==
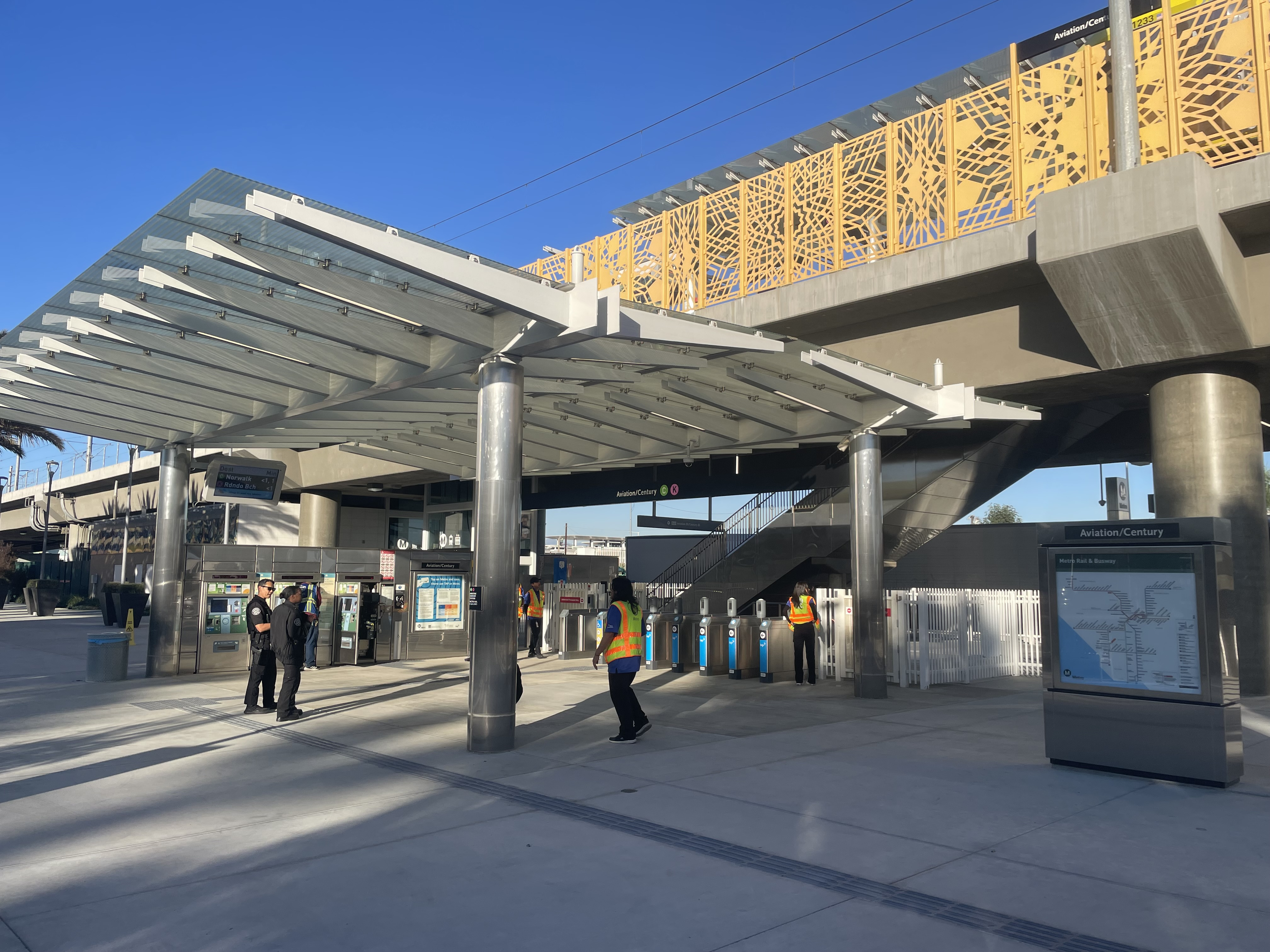
Aviation/Century station street level plaza the day after opening day

The station incorporates artwork by the artist Sherin Guirguis. The main component of the Aviation station art is a richly colored artwork for the platform and fence. Filled with yellow designs and patterns, the artwork reflects the diversity of the surrounding neighborhood and the rest of Los Angeles County, representing those who migrated to the area.
