= Aviation Boulevard =

Los Angeles road near LAX airport

Aviation Boulevard is a major north–south thoroughfare in western and the South Bay region of Los Angeles County, California.

== Route Description ==
Aviation Boulevard runs for 7.1 miles (11.4 km), starting near Westchester, and through the beach cities of El Segundo, Manhattan Beach and Hermosa Beach, where its southern terminus is at Pacific Coast Highway. It lies adjacent to Los Angeles International Airport, and forms part of the boundary between North Redondo Beach and Manhattan Beach. The former Aviation High School was located at the intersection of Aviation Boulevard and Manhattan Beach Boulevard. Aviation Boulevard also intersects with Century Boulevard, El Segundo Boulevard, Imperial Highway, Rosecrans Boulevard, and Artesia Boulevard.

The northern end is a continuation of Florence Avenue at Manchester Avenue in Inglewood.

== Transportation ==
Bus routes on Aviation Boulevard include LA Metro lines 120 and 232, Beach Cities Transit line 109, GTrans line 5, and Torrance Transit line 8. The Metro C Line operates a station under Interstate 105, as well as another station (also served by the Metro K Line) at Century Boulevard, and the new LAX/Metro Transit Center station at 96th Street (serving the C and K Line) along with SkyLink service (to open by late next year).
