= Aviation/Imperial station =

Light rail station in Los Angeles, California

Aviation/Imperial
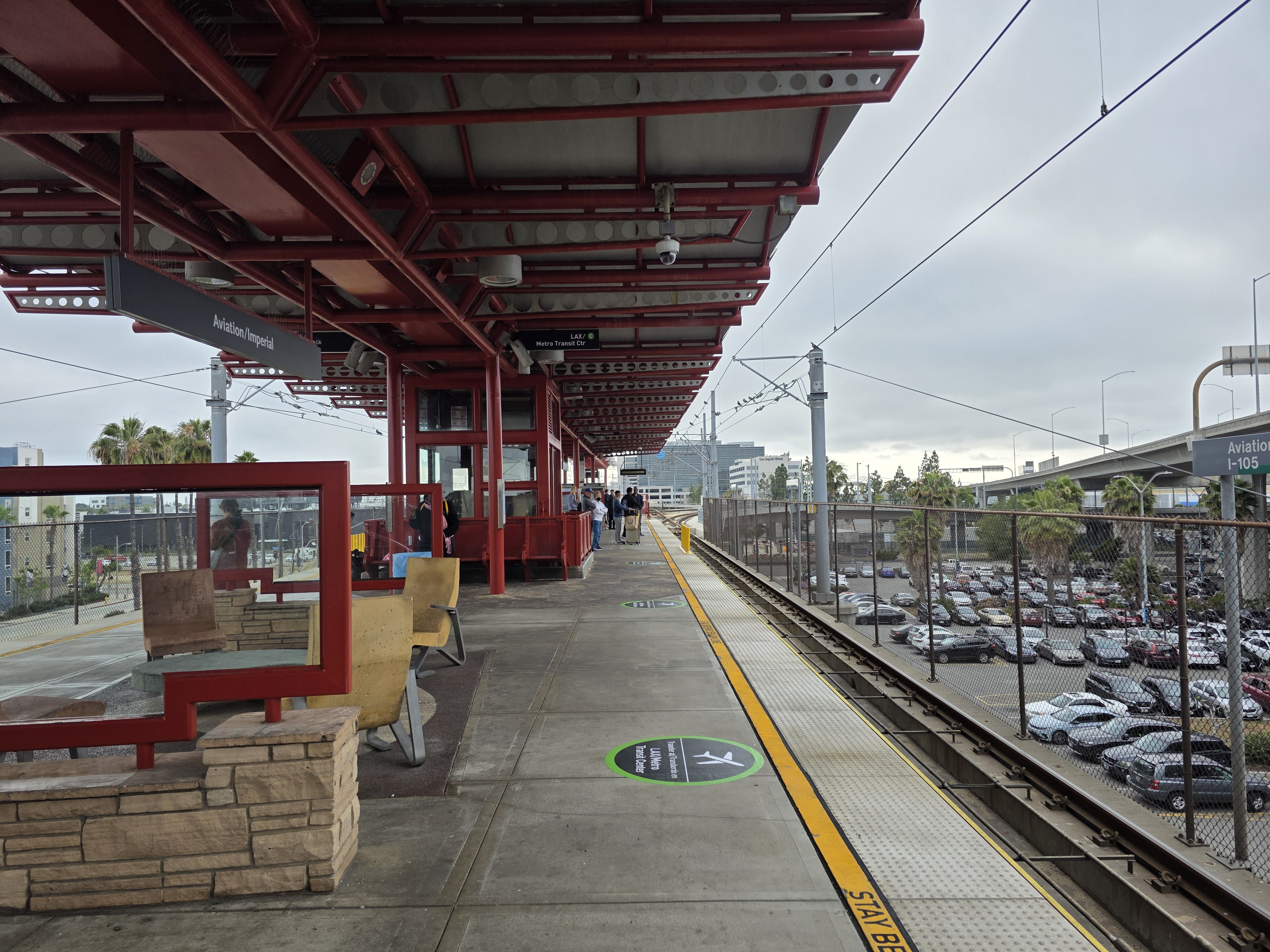
- Aviation/Imperial station platform, 2025

General information
- Location: 11500 Aviation Boulevard; Los Angeles, California
- Coordinates: 33.9298°N 118.3784°W
- Owner: Los Angeles Metro
- Platforms: 1 island platform
- Tracks: 2
- Connections: See Connections section

Construction
- Structure type: Elevated
- Parking: 435 spaces
- Cycle facilities: Racks and lockers
- Accessible: Yes

History
- Opened: August 12, 1995
- Former names: Aviation Boulevard/I-105 (1995–2000); Aviation (2000–2003); Aviation/LAX (2003–2025)

Passengers
- FY 2026: 1,080 (avg. wkdy boardings)

Services
Preceding station	Metro Rail	Following station
Aviation/Century toward LAX	C Line	Hawthorne/Lennox toward Norwalk

Former services
Preceding station	Metro Rail	Following station
Mariposa toward Redondo Beach	C Line	Hawthorne/Lennox toward Norwalk
Location

Aviation/Imperial station is an elevated light rail station on the C Line of the Los Angeles Metro Rail system. It is located over Aviation Boulevard near its intersection with Imperial Highway and south of Interstate 105 in the Westchester neighborhood of Los Angeles, California and immediately adjacent to the Del Aire neighborhood. It opened as part of the Green Line on August 12, 1995. The station was initially named Aviation Boulevard/I-105 station, but in 2003, it was renamed Aviation/LAX station to highlight its proximity to Los Angeles International Airport. It was renamed again to Aviation/Imperial station on June 6, 2025, coinciding with the opening of the LAX/Metro Transit Center.

The train platform, currently suitable for two-car trains, is planned to be lengthened by 2028 to accommodate longer three-car trains.

== Service ==
=== Hours and frequency ===
C Line service hours are approximately from 4:00 a.m. until 12:30 a.m. daily. Trains operate every 10 minutes throughout the day. Night and early morning weekend service is every 20 minutes.

=== Connections ===
As of June 6, 2025, the following connections are available:

- Beach Cities Transit: 109
- GTrans (Gardena): 5
- LADOT Commuter Express: 438
- Los Angeles Metro Bus: 40 (late night only), 120, 232
- Metro Micro: LAX/Inglewood Zone
- Torrance Transit: 8

== Notable places nearby ==
The station is within walking distance of the following facilities:

- Los Angeles County LAX Courthouse (in Del Aire)
- Los Angeles Times Headquarters (in El Segundo)
- LAX Global Entry Enrollment Center
