= Dominguez Channel =

River in southern Los Angeles County, California

Coordinates: 33.7777°N 118.2404°W

Location
- County: Southern Los Angeles County
- State: California
- Country: United States

Physical characteristics
- Source: Local drainage system
  - location: Hawthorne
- Mouth: San Pedro Bay, Pacific Ocean
  - location: Wilmington at East Basin, Port of Los Angeles
- Basin size: Dominguez Watershed; 133 sq mi (340 km^{2})

Dominguez Channel (Spanish: Canal de Domínguez) is a 15.7-mile-long (25.3 km) stream in southern Los Angeles County, California, in the center of the Dominguez Watershed of 133 square miles (340 km^{2}).

The watershed area is 96 percent developed and largely residential. Subsurface storm drain tributaries and open flood control channels flow into the channel. The channel originally was named after a racial slur but was changed to Laguna de Los Dominguez in 1938.

== Course ==
The stream begins just south of 116th Street in Hawthorne and flows through El Camino Village, Gardena, Alondra Park, Torrance, Harbor Gateway, Carson, and Wilmington, and empties into the East Basin of the Port of Los Angeles, in San Pedro Bay on the Pacific Ocean. There is a public community bicycle path with signage and native plant landscaping built atop the Dominguez River levee for several miles in the upper reach of the river in Hawthorne and El Camino Village and again in the lower reach of the river between Gardena and Carson, with several miles of the bicycle route in Torrance. There is a gap in the middle stretch, as well as in Carson, Torrance, and Wilmington through the oil refinery to the terminus of the levee at the ocean harbor. Lower Dominguez Channel, for the last few miles before reaching the ocean harbor, becomes an estuary mixing freshwater and ocean water together, overlying a wetland soil between uncemented boulder levees that serves as wildlife habitat and wildflower habitat for migratory native birds and native wetland vegetation.

== Incidents ==
In 1941, the channel and surrounding wetlands caught fire, sparked by firefighters burning oil seepage from a quake-damaged pipeline. The channel suffered frequent flooding until it was lined with rocks in the 1960s.

In October 2021, the channel had a pollution event that caused a release of hydrogen sulfide into the air, sickening and forcing evacuation of residents in the city of Carson, as well as Gardena, Long Beach, Redondo Beach, Torrance and Wilmington and other parts of Los Angeles County. A warehouse fire led to the accidental release of ethanol used for hand sanitizer, which killed vegetation in the channel which rapidly decayed and released hydrogen sulfide. The South Coast Air Quality Management District issued notices of violation to four companies connected to the warehouse in question.

The warehouse was owned by Artnaturals, a cosmetics company that had not made hand sanitizer before the COVID-19 pandemic, but began making it due to the surge in demand for the product. It caught fire on September 30, 2021. Water sprayed by firefighters flushed sanitizer and other chemicals into the Dominguez channel.

The issue was addressed by pumping oxygen into the channel, because hydrogen sulfide is produced in unoxygenated environments. During the initial two months, the Los Angeles County Department of Public Works paid for more than 3,000 people to move into hotels who were experiencing symptoms and also provided 27,000 air purifiers to homes to mitigate the powerful odor.

In December 2021 and January 2022, a release of untreated sewage into Dominguez Channel prompted five beaches to close. The spill began after a concrete pipe in Carson collapsed. The pipe was 60 years old, and was due to be replaced in less than a year. It had been stressed by the buildup of Sulfuric acid, and the previous week's rainfall.

== Crossings ==
Crossings (bridges) over Dominguez River from the mouth upstream to the source, includes six railroad bridges, 23 public streets, several private roads inside oil refinery properties, two freeways, two state highways, and two parking lots (one of which is at a California community college). The year built of the bridge are within parentheses behind the name of the bridge are listed below:

- Railroad
- North Henry Ford Avenue (2002)
- Railroad
- East Anaheim Street (1997)
- Railroad
- SR 1 - East Pacific Coast Highway (1948)
- East Sepulveda Boulevard (1959)
- Alameda Street (1959)
- Railroad
- Private roads
- East 223rd Street & Wilmington Avenue (1963)
- Railroad
- I-405 - San Diego Freeway (1962)
- East Carson Street (1959)
- East 213th Street (1961)
- Avalon Boulevard (1962)
- East Del Almo Boulevard
- South Main Street (1961)
- South Figueroa Street (1963)
- West 190th Street (1966)
- I-110 - Harbor Freeway (1960 and 1985; connectors included)
- West 182nd Street (1964)
- South Vermont Avenue (1958)
- Normandie Avenue (1958)
- South Western Avenue (1960)
- SR 91 - Artesia Boulevard (1958)
- Gramercy Place (1959)
- Van Ness Avenue (1960)
- Crenshaw Boulevard (1960)
- Cherry Avenue (1960)
- West Redondo Beach Boulevard (1960)
- Parking lot of El Camino College
- Manhattan Beach Boulevard (1961)
- Marine Avenue (1961)
- West 147th Street (1974)
- Crenshaw Boulevard (1962)
- West Rosecrans Avenue (1962)
- West 135th Street (1961)
- West El Segundo Avenue (1966)
- Railroad
- Entrance 17
- Private road
- West 120th Street
- Crenshaw Boulevard (1990)
- Crenshaw Station Park & Ride (1994)
- Ramps to Interstate 105
- I-105 - Glenn Anderson Freeway and Metro C Line (1992)
