= Hawthorne/Lennox station =

Light rail station in Lennox, California

Hawthorne/Lennox
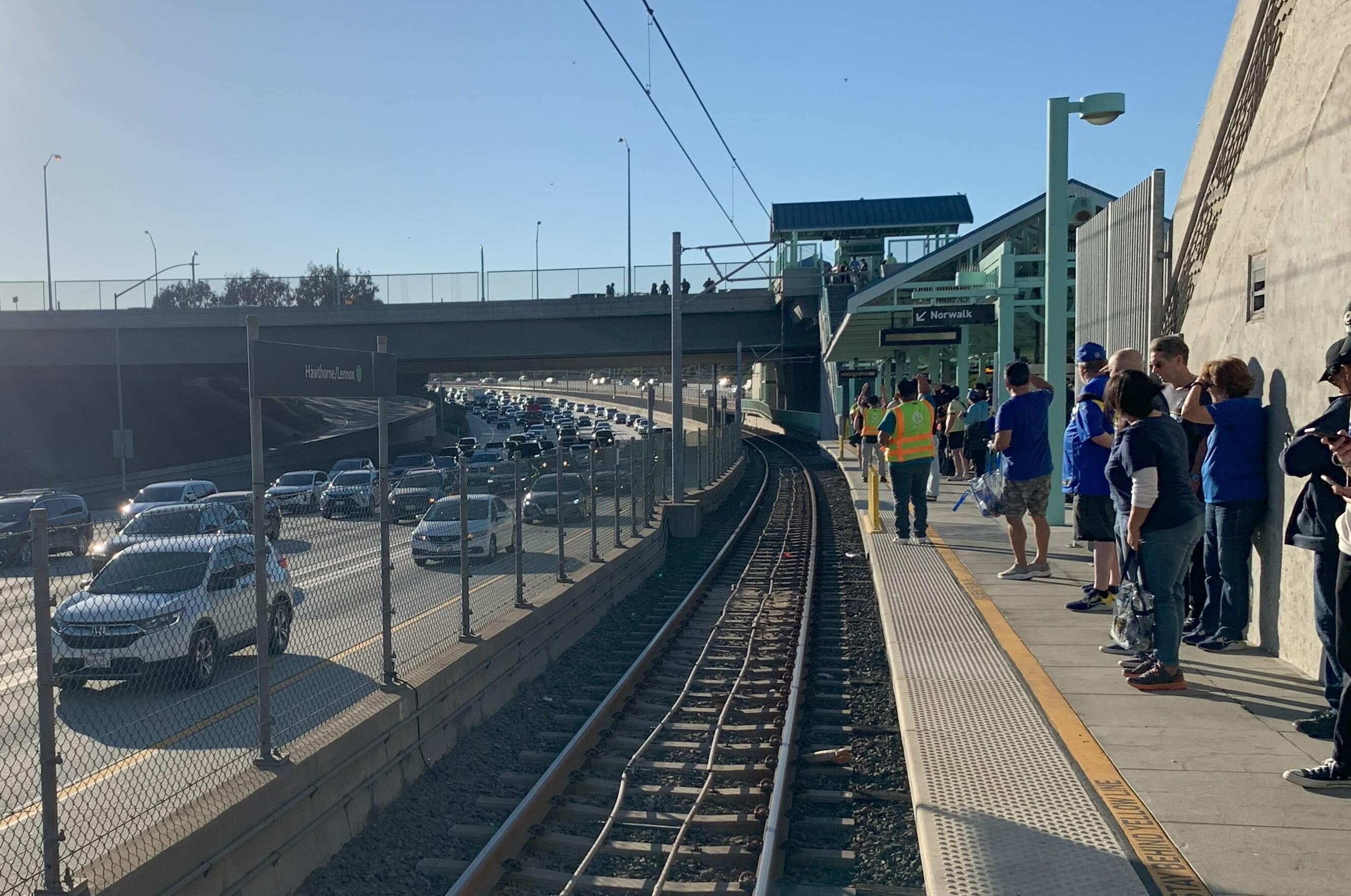
- Los Angeles Rams fans on the Hawthorne/Lennox station platform, October 2023

General information
- Location: 11132 Hawthorne Boulevard; Lennox, California
- Coordinates: 33.9335°N 118.3526°W
- Owner: Los Angeles County Metropolitan Transportation Authority
- Platforms: 1 island platform
- Tracks: 2
- Connections: GTrans; Intuit Dome Shuttle; Los Angeles Metro Bus; Metro Micro; the Link

Construction
- Structure type: Freeway median, below-grade
- Parking: 362 spaces
- Accessible: Yes

History
- Opened: August 12, 1995
- Former names: Hawthorne Blvd/I-105 (1995–2000); Hawthorne (2000–2012)

Passengers
- FY 2025: 1,470 (avg. wkdy boardings)

Services
Preceding station	Metro Rail	Following station
Aviation/Imperial toward LAX	C Line	Crenshaw toward Norwalk
Location

Hawthorne/Lennox station is a below-grade light rail station on the C Line of the Los Angeles Metro Rail system. It is situated in the median of Interstate 105 (Century Freeway) and named after Hawthorne Boulevard and the Lennox community where it is located. The station is also close to the city of Hawthorne and opened as part of the Green Line on August 12, 1995.

The station was initially named Hawthorne Blvd/I-105 but was later simplified to Hawthorne/Lennox in 2012 with its location clarified.

== Notable places nearby ==
The station is within walking distance of the following notable places:

- Lennox Mathematics, Science & Technology Academy
- Cockatoo Inn
- Ánimo Leadership Charter High School

== Service ==
=== Hours and frequency ===
C Line service hours are approximately from 4:00 a.m. until 12:30 a.m. daily. Trains operate every 10 minutes throughout the day. Night and early morning weekend service is every 20 minutes.

=== Connections ===
As of June 6, 2025, the following connections are available:

- GTrans (Gardena): 7X (Sundays only)
- Intuit Dome Shuttle (service to all events at Intuit Dome)
- Los Angeles Metro Bus: 40, 212
- Metro Micro: LAX/Inglewood Zone
- the Link: Lennox
