= Harbor Freeway station =

Light rail and bus rapid transit station in Los Angeles, California

Harbor Fwy
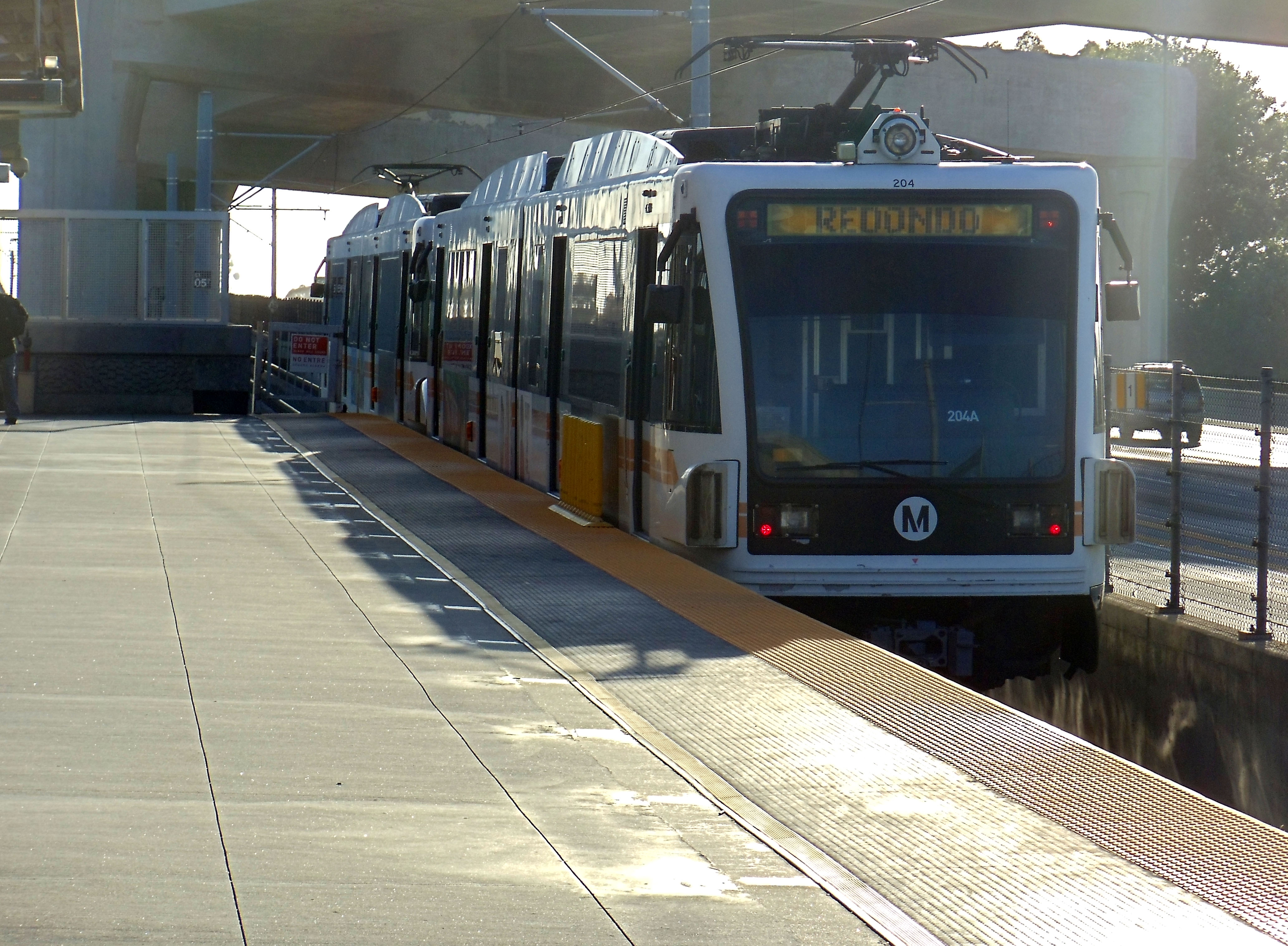
- A C Line train stops at the upper level of Harbor Freeway station

General information
- Location: 11500 South Figueroa Street; Los Angeles, California
- Coordinates: 33°55′43″N 118°16′51″W
- Owner: Caltrans
- Operator: Los Angeles Metro
- Platforms: 1 island platform (C Line); 1 island platform (J Line)
- Tracks: 2 freeway median, elevated (C Line)
- Connections: See service section

Construction
- Structure type: Freeway median Elevated (C Line); At-grade (J Line)
- Parking: 253 spaces
- Cycle facilities: Racks
- Accessible: Yes

History
- Opened: August 12, 1995 (C Line); August 1, 1996 (Harbor Transitway)
- Former names: Harbor Freeway/I-105

Passengers
- FY 2025: 3,400 (avg. wkdy boardings, C & J lines only)

Services
Preceding station	Metro Rail	Following station
Vermont/Athens toward LAX	C Line	Avalon toward Norwalk
Preceding station	Metro Busway	Following station
Rosecrans toward Harbor Gateway or San Pedro	J Line	Manchester toward El Monte
Former services
Preceding station	Pacific Electric	Following station
Delta toward San Pedro	San Pedro via Gardena	Main Street toward Pacific Electric Building
Delta toward Clifton	Redondo Beach via Gardena	Main Street toward Pacific Electric Building
Delta toward Clifton	Hawthorne–El Nido	Main Street toward Pacific Electric Building
Preceding station	Los Angeles Railway	Following station
Terminus	7	Athens and 112th toward Temple and Spring
Location

Harbor Freeway station (formerly Harbor Freeway/I-105 station) is a transit center located on the Harbor Transitway, within the Judge Harry Pregerson Interchange of Interstate 105 and Interstate 110 (Harbor Freeway) near Figueroa Street in the neighborhood of South Los Angeles. The station is served by the light rail C Line, the bus rapid transit J Line and other bus services. The station is owned by Caltrans and operated by Los Angeles Metro.

== Service ==
=== Station layout ===
The station has three levels: the upper level provides access to the C Line, the middle level has the connections to local bus services and the 253 space park and ride lot, and the lower level provides access to the J Line and other express buses operating on the Harbor Transitway. It is located near the Athens district of Los Angeles.

=== Hours and frequency ===
C Line service hours are approximately from 4:00 a.m. until 12:30 a.m. daily. Trains operate every 10 minutes throughout the day. Night and early morning weekend service is every 20 minutes.

J Line buses run 24 hours a day between El Monte, Downtown Los Angeles, and the Harbor Gateway Transit Center, as route 910. Some trips continue to San Pedro between 6 a.m. and 8 p.m. and are signed as Route 950. On weekdays, buses operate every four to eight minutes during peak hours. They operate every 10 minutes in the midday, 20 minutes during evenings, 40 minutes during nights, and every hour overnight. On weekends, buses arrive every 15 minutes most of the day. They operate every 20 minutes during evenings, 40 minutes during nights, and every hour overnight.

=== Other Harbor Transitway services ===
As of June 6, 2025, these routes stop at the same boarding platforms of the Metro J Line at the freeway level:

- Dodger Stadium Express (home games during baseball season only)
- LADOT Commuter Express: 448 (weekday rush-hour only)
- Los Angeles Metro Bus: Express 550 (weekday rush-hour only)
- Torrance Transit: 4X

=== Connections ===
These non-Harbor Transitway routes stop on the west side of Figueroa Street:

- Los Angeles Metro Bus: 45, 81, 120, 127
- GTrans (Gardena): 1X
- Torrance Transit: 1

=== Freeway noise issues ===
Due to the upper platform's location within a freeway median and in the interchange of two of Los Angeles' busiest freeways, it has received criticism for subjecting C-train riders to significant amounts of highway traffic noise and has been cited as a notable example of hostile transit infrastructure.

== History ==
The site is approximately the former Forest (later South Los Angeles) station on the San Pedro via Gardena Line of the Pacific Electric. It was also the southern terminus of the Los Angeles Railway 7 Line, allowing interchanges between the two systems. Pacific Electric service ended in 1940, while the 7 Line ran until 1955.

== Incident ==
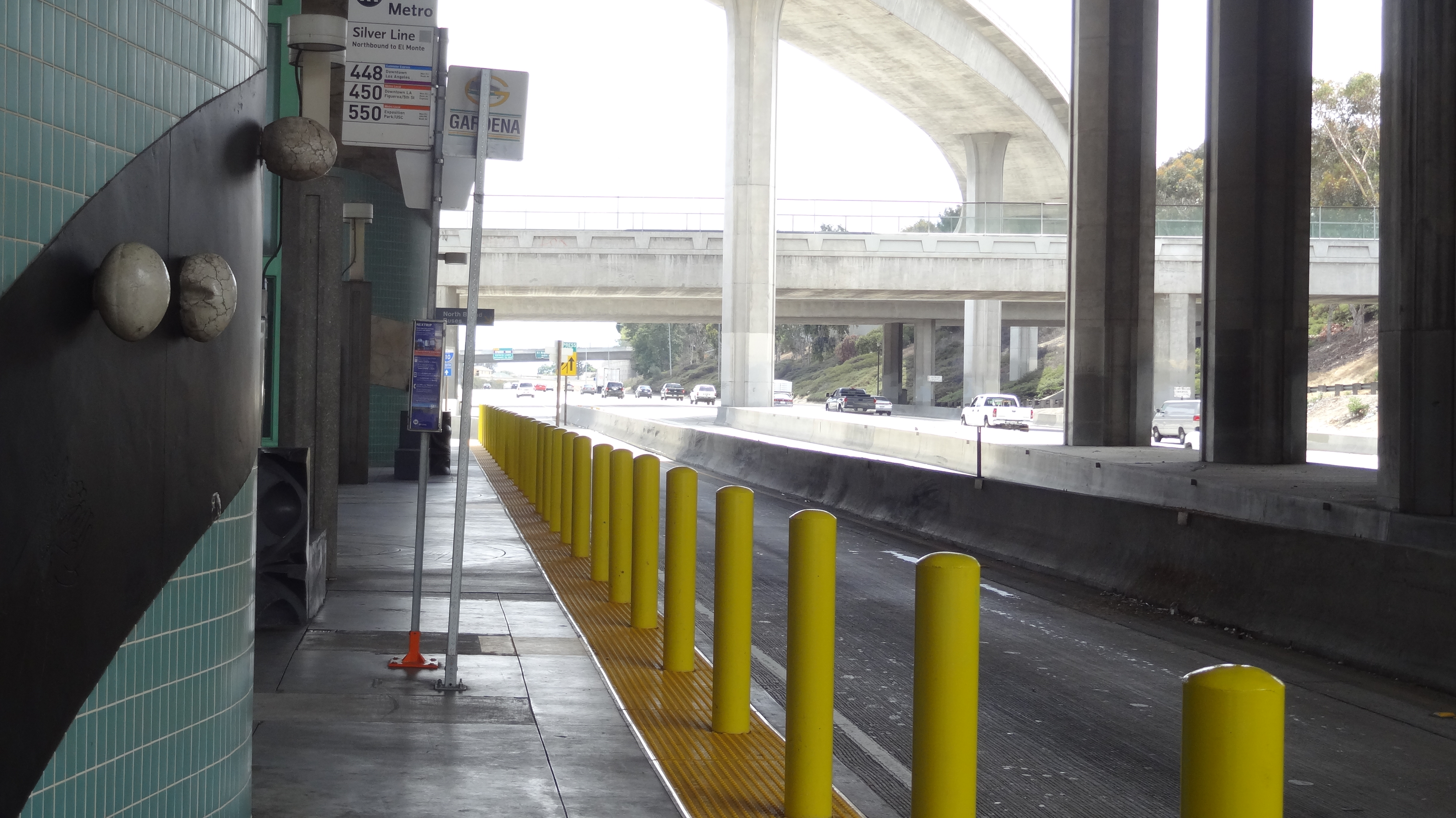
Bollards were installed at Harbor Freeway station and all similar stations after the crash.

On February 22, 2012, a drunk driver on the Harbor Freeway mistakenly entered the bus-only station area of the Harbor Freeway station. The driver, 51-year-old Stephen L. Lubin of Sun Valley, was traveling 80 miles per hour (130 km/h) in his 2009 Honda Fit (15 mph (24 km/h) over the freeway's posted speed limit) as he entered the station and encountered a bus stopped at the platform. Lubin swerved to avoid hitting the bus and drove onto the station platform where he hit seven people, critically injuring six, before slamming into a pole on the platform.

After the crash, Metro's CEO Art Leahy asked Metro's safety committee staff to review the layout of busway stations and safety signage on the roadways leading into the station areas. As a result of that investigation, Metro added concrete-filled metal bollards to all stations on the Harbor Transitway and the El Monte Busway to prevent vehicles from entering the platform and additional markings were added on roadways leading into stations.
