= Imperial Highway =

Thoroughfare in southern California, United States

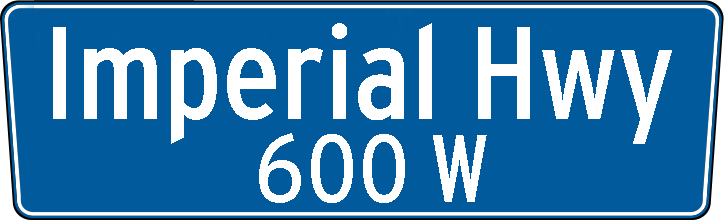
- Imperial Highway street sign in Los Angeles
- Part of: CR S2 from SR 98 to Warner Springs; SR 90 from Anaheim to La Habra
- Maintained by: Local jurisdictions, Caltrans (for the portion between SR 39 and SR 91)
- Length: 105 mi (169 km)
- Location: California
- Nearest metro station: : Willowbrook/Rosa Parks; Aviation/Imperial
- Southeastern end: SR 98 near Ocotillo
- Major junctions: I-8 / CR S80 in Ocotillo; SR 78 near Scissors Crossing; SR 79 near Warner Springs; — Gap In Route —; SR 90 / SR 91 in Anaheim; SR 57 in Brea; I-5 in Norwalk; I-605 in Norwalk; I-710 in Lynwood; I-110 in Los Angeles; I-105 / I-405 in Hawthorne; SR 1 in El Segundo
- Northwestern end: Vista Del Mar in Playa Del Rey

Construction
- Inauguration: 1931

The Imperial Highway is a west-east thoroughfare in the counties of Los Angeles, Orange, Riverside, San Diego, and Imperial in the U.S. state of California. The main portion of the existing route begins at Vista Del Mar in Los Angeles near the Los Angeles International Airport and ends at the Anaheim–Orange city line at Via Escola where it becomes Cannon Street. Historically, the Imperial Highway extended from Vista Del Mar to Calexico, where a portion of the highway still exists. The original route was replaced with other highways, leading the older portions of the Imperial Highway to fall out of use.

== Route ==
The total length of the Greater Los Angeles portion of the Imperial Highway is approximately 41 miles (66 km), of which 14 miles (23 km) run through Orange County and 27 miles (43 km) through Los Angeles County.

Between SR 91 and SR 39, Imperial Highway is signed as State Route 90. A de facto freeway portion of the route in Yorba Linda is also known as the Richard M. Nixon Freeway.

The portion in Los Angeles County between Lakewood Boulevard and Valley View Avenue is located about one mile north of, and runs parallel to, Rosecrans Avenue.

=== Cities ===
Starting from Cannon Street & Via Escola in Orange, going east to west Cannon Street becomes Imperial Highway upon entering Anaheim. The highway then passes through the cities and communities of Anaheim Hills, Yorba Linda, Placentia, Brea, Fullerton, La Habra, La Mirada, Santa Fe Springs (some sections in La Mirada and Santa Fe Springs are next to unincorporated LA County), Norwalk, Downey, South Gate, Lynwood, Los Angeles (Watts, and South LA – a portion after South LA is in unincorporated LA County), Inglewood, Hawthorne, El Segundo (southside of street only), and Westchester (part of Los Angeles on the northside). Imperial Highway ends at Dockweiler Beach on Vista Del Mar near Playa Del Rey, just past LAX.

=== Freeways ===
Along its route, Imperial Highway crosses over or under these freeways from west to east:

- Interstate 105
- California State Route 1
- Interstate 405
- Interstate 110
- Interstate 710
- Interstate 605
- Interstate 5
- California State Route 39
- California State Route 57
- California State Route 91
- Interstate 8

== Transportation ==
Metro Local Lines 120, 232, and formerly 625 run via Imperial Highway, as well as Norwalk Transit Line 4, Commuter Express Line 438, Beach Cities Transit Line 109, and Metro Express Line 460 (in Norwalk between Hoxie Ave / I-605 and Pioneer Blvd / I-5). Metro line 625 ran between Pershing Drive and La Cienega Boulevard. Metro line 120 runs between Aviation Boulevard and Norwalk Station, Metro Line 232 runs between Aviation Boulevard and Sepulveda Boulevard, Beach Cities Transit line 109 between Aviation Boulevard and California Street, LADOT Commuter Express line 438 between the I-105 on-ramp and Vista Del Mar, and Norwalk line 4 between Norwalk Station and Beach Boulevard. Imperial intersects with the Metro A and C Lines at Wilmington Avenue in Willowbrook at the Willowbrook/Rosa Parks station. There is also another C Line station at Aviation Boulevard.

Western terminus coordinates (El Segundo): 33°55′50.91″N 118°26′5.42″W
Eastern terminus coordinates (Anaheim): 33°50′7.76″N 117°47′43.32″W

== History ==
Imperial Highway was built in large part because of lobbying from the Imperial Highway Association, founded in 1929. The Imperial Highway Association lobbied city and county governments to build Imperial Highway, gaining cities along the way until the highway finished construction in 1961.

Imperial Highway was initially conceived as a commercial route connecting Imperial County to Los Angeles County. A segment remains today as California County Route S2 in Imperial County which connects Interstate 8 near Ocotillo. A segment in San Diego County was renamed the Great Overland Stage Route of 1849. Another segment adjacent to Lake Elsinore (Riverside County) was once indicated on 1960s vicinity maps by H.M. Gousha (Gousha), publisher of street maps.

== Other uses ==
There are other Imperial Highways in the United States, including one in San Diego (better known as Imperial Avenue) and in the Detroit suburbs of Redford Township, Michigan and Westland, Michigan. Despite the name, Westland's version runs a mere three blocks, north from Bock Street, then northeast from Hambleton Street, across John Hauk Road and stopping at Pardo Street. (It used to continue to Ford Road, but this section has been a hardware store parking lot since the 1970s.)

== Notes ==
1. Interstate 8's crossing with Imperial Highway occurs when Sweeny Pass Road becomes Imperial Highway for 7.4 miles, near the town of Ocotillo. It ends at a terminus with California State Route 98, 185 miles away from where Imperial Highway usually ends.
