= Willowbrook/Rosa Parks station =

Los Angeles Metro Rail station

Willowbrook/Rosa Parks
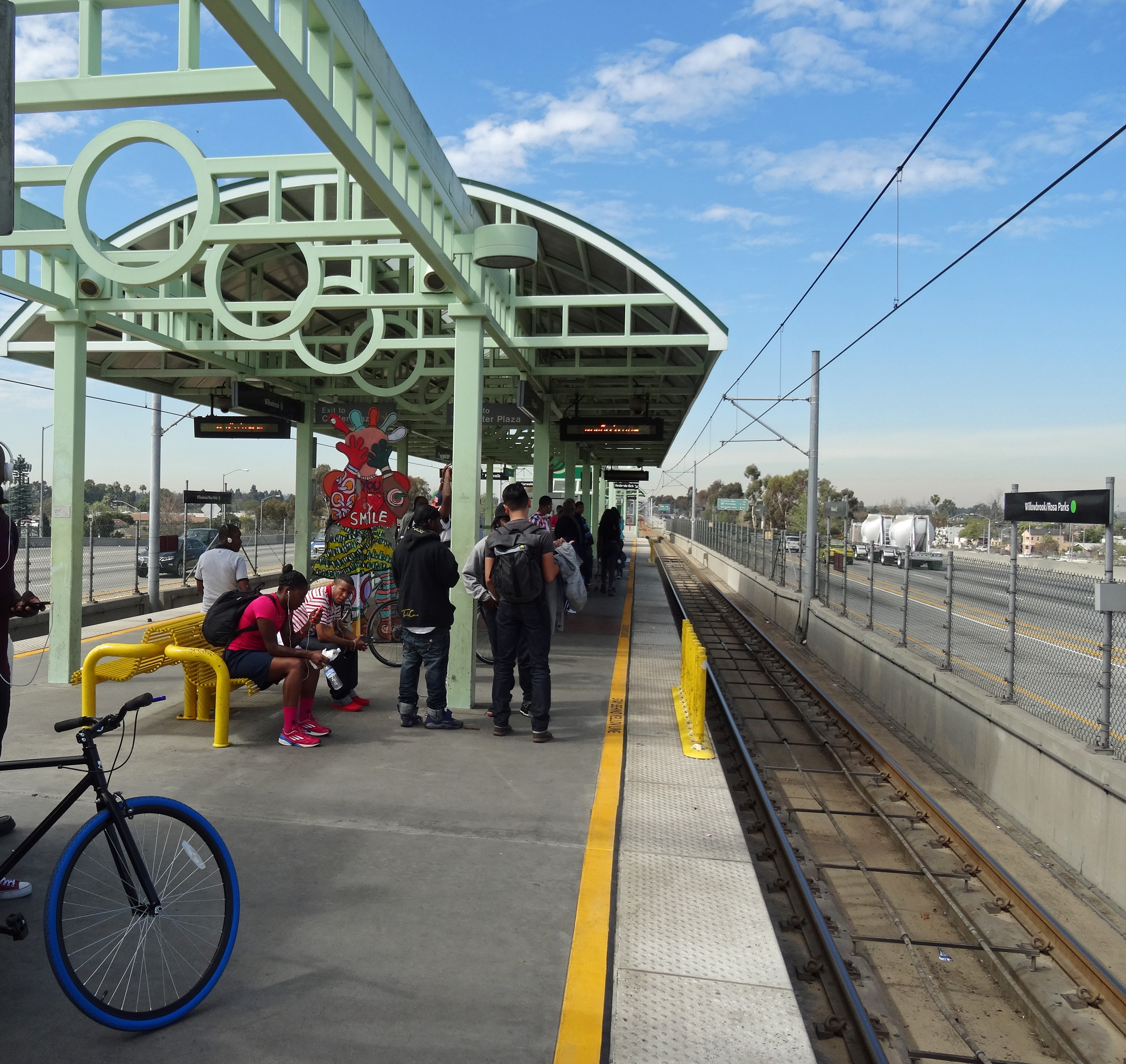
- Willowbrook/Rosa Parks station upper platform for the C Line

General information
- Location: 11611 Willowbrook Avenue (A Line); 11651 Wilmington Avenue (C Line); Willowbrook, California
- Coordinates: 33.9282°N 118.2380°W
- Owner: Los Angeles County Metropolitan Transportation Authority
- Platforms: 1 island platform (A Line); 1 island platform (C Line)
- Tracks: 2 surface (A Line); 2 freeway median, elevated (C Line)
- Connections: See connections section

Construction
- Structure type: At-grade (A Line); Freeway median, elevated (C Line)
- Parking: 234 spaces
- Cycle facilities: Metro Bike Hub, racks and lockers
- Accessible: Yes

History
- Opened: July 14, 1990 (A Line); August 12, 1995 (C Line)
- Rebuilt: August 9, 2021
- Former names: Imperial (1990–1995); Imperial/Wilmington Ave (1995–2011)

Passengers
- FY 2025: 8,073 (avg. wkdy boardings)

Services
Preceding station	Metro Rail	Following station
Compton toward Long Beach	A Line	103rd Street/Watts Towers toward Pomona
Avalon toward LAX	C Line	Lynwood toward Norwalk
Former services (as Abila)
Preceding station	Pacific Electric	Following station
Springdale toward Morgan Avenue	Long Beach	Watts toward Pacific Electric Building
Springdale toward Balboa	Balboa	Watts toward Pacific Electric Building
Springdale toward San Pedro	San Pedro via Dominguez	Watts toward Pacific Electric Building
Location

Willowbrook/Rosa Parks station is a major transport hub and Los Angeles Metro Rail station that serves the A and C lines. The station, located at the intersection of Imperial Highway and Wilmington Avenue in the Willowbrook community of Los Angeles County, is a major transfer point for commuters.

As a major transfer station, Willowbrook/Rosa Parks station also acts as a major bus hub, serving many bus routes operated by Metro and other regional/municipal transit agencies. The station also has park and ride facilities, including 975 parking spaces and 4 bike lockers. To the east of the station is the Metro Rail Operations Center, which is the dispatch hub for all Metro Rail train operators.

The station is located in unincorporated Willowbrook, near the Los Angeles community of Watts in the South Los Angeles region. It is directly across the street from the Imperial Courts Housing Project, which is located within the City of Los Angeles. The C Line platform for this station is located in the median strip of Interstate 105.

The station's official name memorializes Rosa Parks, an African-American civil rights activist. From the Blue (A) Line's opening on July 14, 1990 until the Green (C) Line opened on August 12, 1995 the Blue Line station platform was known as Imperial station while the Green Line station platform was planned to be called Wilmington station and then the station was called Imperial/Wilmington station from the Green Line's opening in 1995 until it was changed to its current name in 2011.

== History ==
A $10.25 million grant from the United States Department of Transportation in 2014 was used to partially fund $53 million in major upgrades to the station, including improved lighting, new paintings, new central plaza and extended platforms.

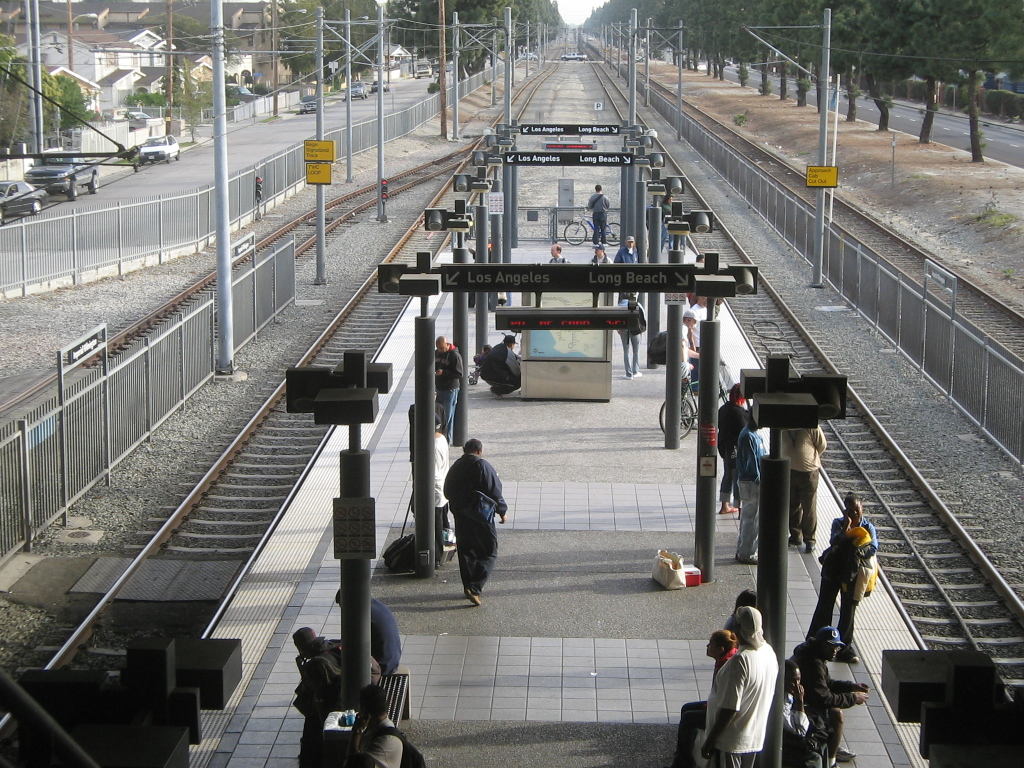
A Line platform as seen from mezzanine prior to renovation, 2006

The Blue Line portion of the station was closed from January 26 to November 2, 2019 for a major renovation project as part of the New Blue Improvements Project.

== Service ==
=== Station layout ===
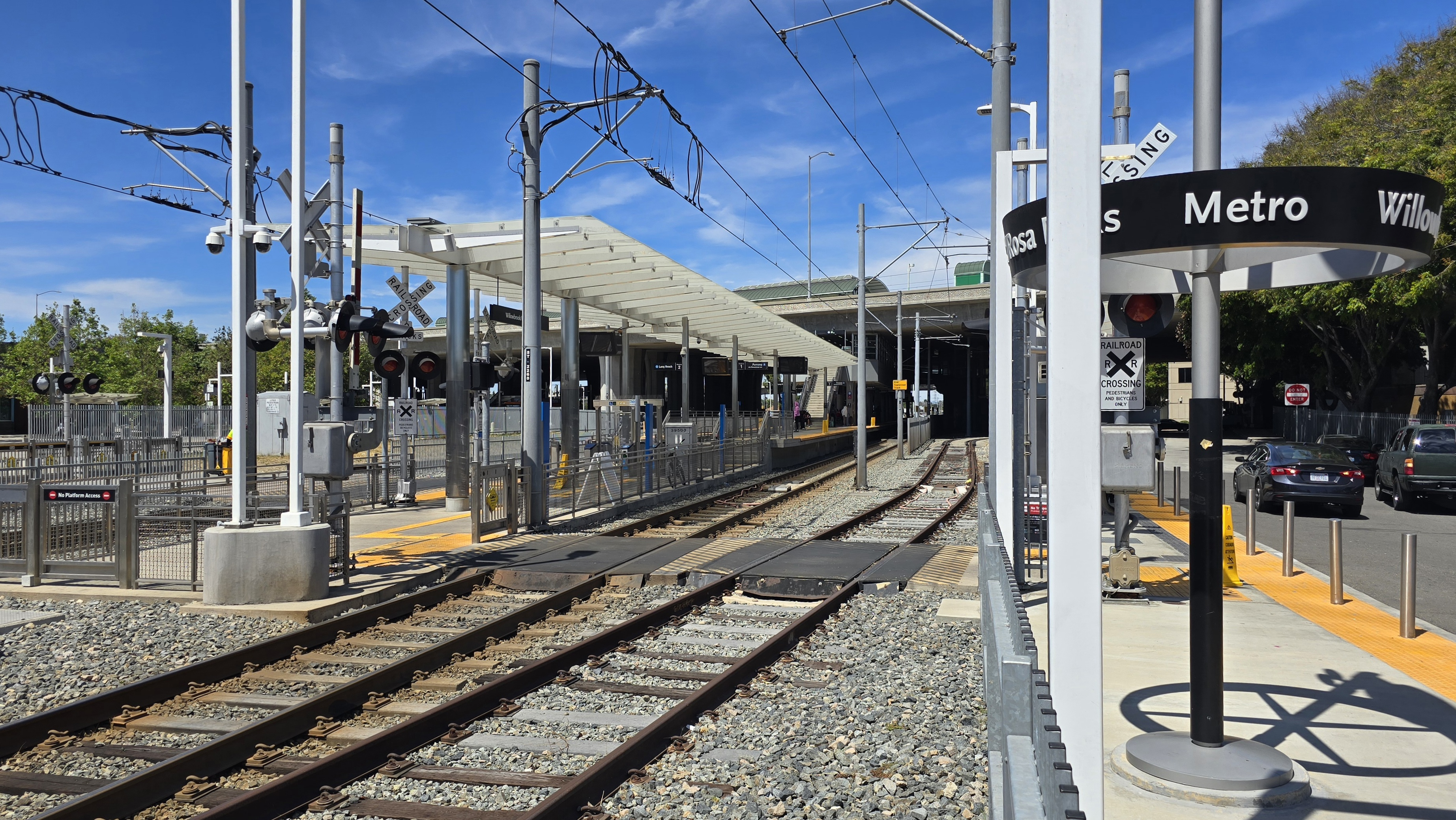
The at-grade A Line platform in 2026

The A Line platform is on the street level, and the C Line platform is on the upper (freeway) level. The two levels are connected by stairs/escalators/elevators via a mezzanine. Ticket machines are located on street level and on the mezzanine.

A spur track connects the northbound A Line just south of the station to a pocket track on the C Line, allowing trains to transfer between the two lines when necessary, usually to allow fleet repositioning. This track is not used for revenue service.

=== Hours and frequency ===
A Line service hours are from approximately 4:30 a.m. and 11:45 p.m. daily. Trains operate every 8 minutes during peak hours, Monday to Friday. Trains run every 10 minutes, during midday on weekdays and weekends, from 9:00 a.m. to 7:00 p.m. Night and early morning service is approximately every 20 minutes every day.

C Line service hours are approximately from 4:00 a.m. until 12:30 a.m. daily. Trains operate every 10 minutes throughout the day. Night and early morning weekend service is every 20 minutes.

=== Connections ===
As of June 6, 2025, the following connections are available:

- GTrans (Gardena): 5
- LADOT DASH: Watts
- Los Angeles Metro Bus: 53, 55, 120, 202, 205, 260
- The Link: King Medical Center, Willowbrook Route A, Willowbrook Route B
- Lynwood Breeze: D
- Metro Micro: Watts/Compton Zone
- Rancho Los Amigos National Rehabilitation Center Shuttle

== Notable places nearby ==
The station is within walking distance of the following notable places:

- King-Drew Medical Center
- King Drew Magnet High School of Medicine and Science
- Kenneth Hahn Plaza
- Verbum Dei High School
