= Avalon station (Los Angeles Metro) =

Los Angeles Metro Rail station

Avalon
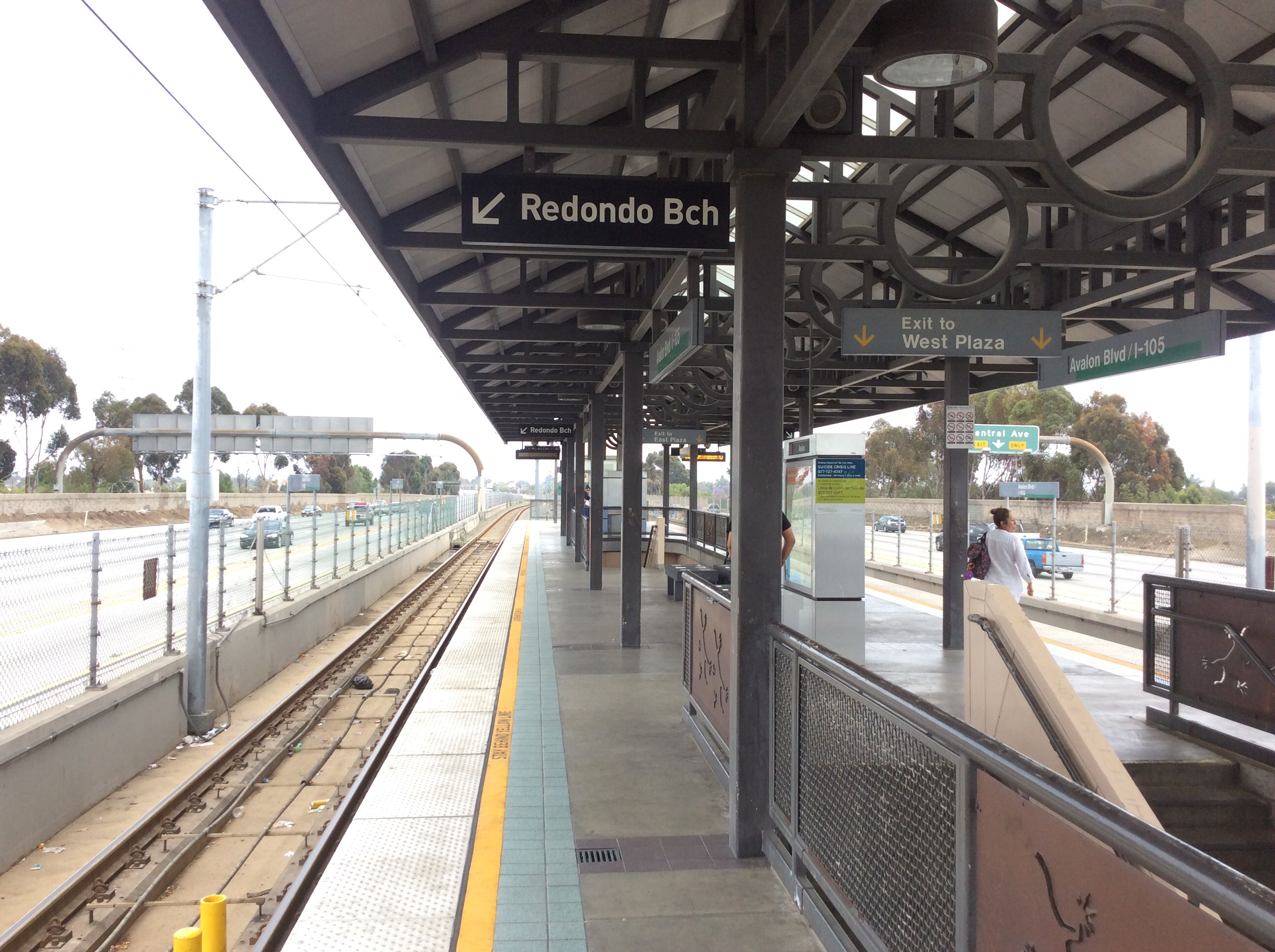
- Avalon station platform

General information
- Location: 11667 South Avalon Boulevard; Los Angeles, California
- Coordinates: 33.9275°N 118.2652°W
- Owner: Los Angeles County Metropolitan Transportation Authority
- Platforms: 1 island platform
- Tracks: 2
- Connections: Los Angeles Metro Bus; LADOT DASH; The Link

Construction
- Structure type: Freeway median, elevated
- Parking: 160 spaces
- Cycle facilities: Racks and lockers
- Accessible: Yes

History
- Opened: August 12, 1995
- Former names: Avalon Blvd/I-105 (1995–2000)

Passengers
- FY 2025: 1,163 (avg. wkdy boardings)

Services
Preceding station	Metro Rail	Following station
Harbor Freeway toward LAX	C Line	Willowbrook/Rosa Parks toward Norwalk
Location

Avalon station is an elevated light rail station on the C Line of the Los Angeles Metro Rail system. It is located in the median of Interstate 105 (Century Freeway), above Avalon Boulevard, after which the station is named, in the neighborhood of Green Meadows. It opened as part of the Green Line on August 12, 1995.

The station was initially named Avalon Blvd/I-105 but was later simplified to Avalon in 2000.

== Service ==
=== Hours and frequency ===
C Line service hours are approximately from 4:00 a.m. until 12:30 a.m. daily. Trains operate every 10 minutes throughout the day. Night and early morning weekend service is every 20 minutes.

=== Connections ===
As of June 6, 2025, the following connections are available:

- LADOT DASH: Watts
- Los Angeles Metro Bus: 48, 51
- The Link: Willowbrook Route A
