= Avalon Boulevard =

Street in Los Angeles County

- Interactive map of Avalon Boulevard
- Length: 17.3 mi (27.8 km)
- Nearest metro station: Avalon
- South end: Water Street in Wilmington
- Major junctions: SR 1 in Wilmington; I-405 in Carson; SR 91 in Carson
- North end: East Jefferson Boulevard / San Pedro Street in South Central Los Angeles

Avalon Boulevard is a north-south street in Los Angeles County.

== Geography ==
Avalon Boulevard emerges southward as a fifth roadbed out of the intersection of San Pedro Street and Jefferson Boulevard. It passes through the southern Los Angeles County cities and communities of Carson, and Willowbrook, ending at Water Street in Wilmington. Its total length is about 17.3 miles (27.8 km). It was named, repaved and reinforced in the 1920s.\

== Transportation ==
Avalon Boulevard carries Metro Local lines 51 and 246; Line 51 serves Avalon Boulevard between Jefferson Boulevard and Victoria Street, and Line 246 south of Victoria Street.

=== Metro C Line ===
The Metro C Line operates a freeway median rail station in the center median of the Century Freeway(Interstate 105) above Avalon Boulevard.

== History ==
Avalon Boulevard would be at the epicenter of the Watts riots sparked by police brutality against a black motorist.
