= Crenshaw station =

Los Angeles Metro Rail station

Crenshaw
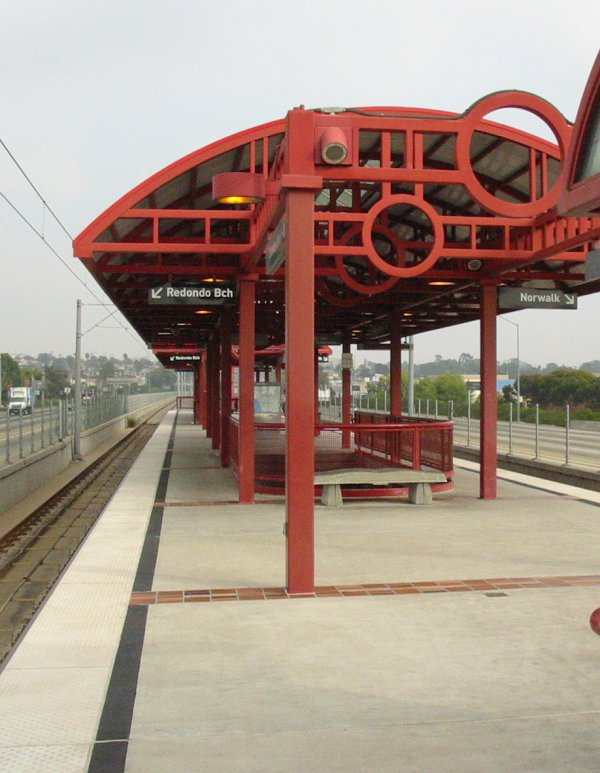
- Crenshaw station platform, 2006

General information
- Location: 11901 South Crenshaw Boulevard; Hawthorne, California
- Coordinates: 33.9252°N 118.3265°W
- Owner: Los Angeles County Metropolitan Transportation Authority
- Platforms: 1 island platform
- Tracks: 2
- Connections: Los Angeles Metro Bus; Torrance Transit

Construction
- Structure type: Freeway median, elevated
- Parking: 506 spaces
- Cycle facilities: Racks and lockers
- Accessible: Yes

History
- Opened: August 12, 1995
- Former names: Crenshaw Blvd/I-105 (1995–2000)

Passengers
- FY 2025: 1,337 (avg. wkdy boardings)

Services
Preceding station	Metro Rail	Following station
Hawthorne/Lennox toward LAX	C Line	Vermont/Athens toward Norwalk
Location

Crenshaw station (sometimes referred to as Crenshaw C Line station to differentiate it from a similarly named station on the E and K Line) is an elevated light rail station on the C Line of the Los Angeles Metro Rail system. It is located in the median of Interstate 105 (Century Freeway), above Crenshaw Boulevard, after which the station is named. The station is in the city of Hawthorne, California and opened as part of the Green Line on August 12, 1995.

The station is not named for the Crenshaw neighborhood of Los Angeles, which is located several miles north of it and is served by the K Line.

The station was initially named Crenshaw/I-105 but was later simplified to Crenshaw in 2000.

The stories on the tiled walls at the station's street-level plaza were collected and organized by Buzz Spector in an artwork entitled "Crenshaw Stories."

== Notable places nearby ==
The station is within walking distance of the following notable places:

- Hawthorne Municipal Airport
- Beach Boys Historic Landmark

== Service ==
=== Hours and frequency ===
C Line service hours are approximately from 4:00 a.m. until 12:30 a.m. daily. Trains operate every 10 minutes throughout the day. Night and early morning weekend service is every 20 minutes.

=== Connections ===
As of June 6, 2025, the following connections are available:

- Los Angeles Metro Bus: 207, 209, 210
- Torrance Transit: 10
