= GTrans =

Municipal transit agency in California, United States

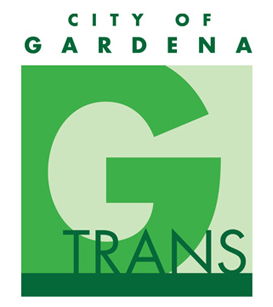

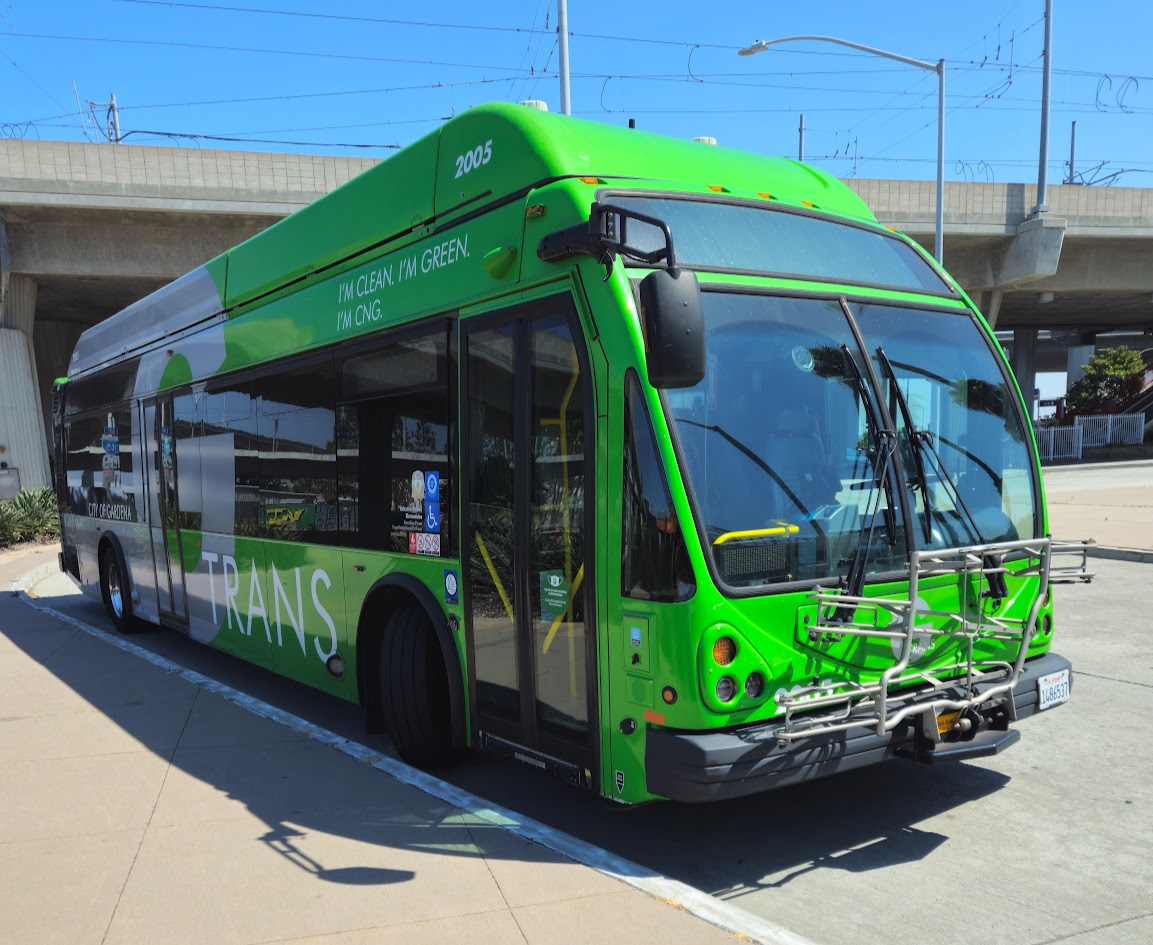
- GTrans bus at Aviation/Imperial station, July 2024
- Parent: City of Gardena
- Founded: January 15, 1940; 86 years ago (as Gardena Municipal Bus Lines)
- Headquarters: 1700 West 162nd Street, Gardena, California
- Locale: Gardena, California
- Service type: bus service, paratransit
- Routes: 6
- Fleet: 76 buses
- Daily ridership: 8,300 (weekdays, Q2 2026)
- Annual ridership: 2,335,500 (2025)
- Fuel type: CNG, battery electric
- Website: ridegtrans.com

GTrans is a municipal transit agency that serves Gardena, California and surrounding Los Angeles County neighbourhoods. It was founded on January 15, 1940, as Gardena Municipal Bus Lines. On the agency's 75th anniversary, the agency was renamed as GTrans. The bus lines complement the Los Angeles County Metropolitan Transportation Authority's crosstown routes through the city. In 2025, the system had a ridership of 2,335,500, or about 8,300 per weekday as of the second quarter of 2026.

== Routes ==
=== Local routes ===
As of November 2026, GTrans operates six routes.

Weekend service is provided on New Year's Day, Martin Luther King, Jr. Day, Memorial Day, Juneteenth, Independence Day, Labor Day, Thanksgiving Day, and Christmas Day.

Route	Terminals		Via	Notes
2	Athens; Vermont/Athens station	Harbor City; Normandie Av & PCH	Western Av, Vermont Av, Normandie Av	Serves Los Angeles Southwest College and Harbor Gateway Transit Center; Clockwise and counter-clockwise route
3	Redondo Beach; Redondo Beach Transit Center	Compton; Compton station	Redondo Beach Bl, Alondra Bl	Serves El Camino College; One westbound morning and one eastbound afternoon trip extended on school days to Bishop Montgomery High School
4	Gardena; El Camino College	Gardena; Harbor Gateway Transit Center	Van Ness Av, Normandie Av	One round trip in the morning and one in the afternoon
5	Los Angeles; LAX/Metro Transit Center	Willowbrook; Willowbrook/Rosa Parks station	El Segundo Bl	Serves Aviation/Imperial station

=== Express routes ===
Route	Terminals		Via	Notes
1X	Redondo Beach; Redondo Beach station	South LA; Harbor Freeway station	Marine Av, Vermont Av	Connects to Metro C and J lines at Harbor Freeway station; Runs every 45 minutes
7X	Inglewood; SoFi Stadium	Gardena; Harbor Gateway Transit Center	I-105, I-110	Premium fare charged; Operates only on Sundays when NFL games are played at SoFi Stadium; Serves Hawthorne/Lennox station

=== Seasonal Routes ===
Route	Terminals		Via	Notes
G	Manhattan Beach; Highland/14th Pl	Gardena Gardena City Hall	Manhattan Beach Blvd, Van Ness Ave, Western Ave	Summer service only; Tuesdays, Wednesdays and Saturdays

- Bolt: On-demand shared-ride service (Monday through Saturday)
