= Lakewood Boulevard station =

Los Angeles Metro Rail station

Lakewood Bl
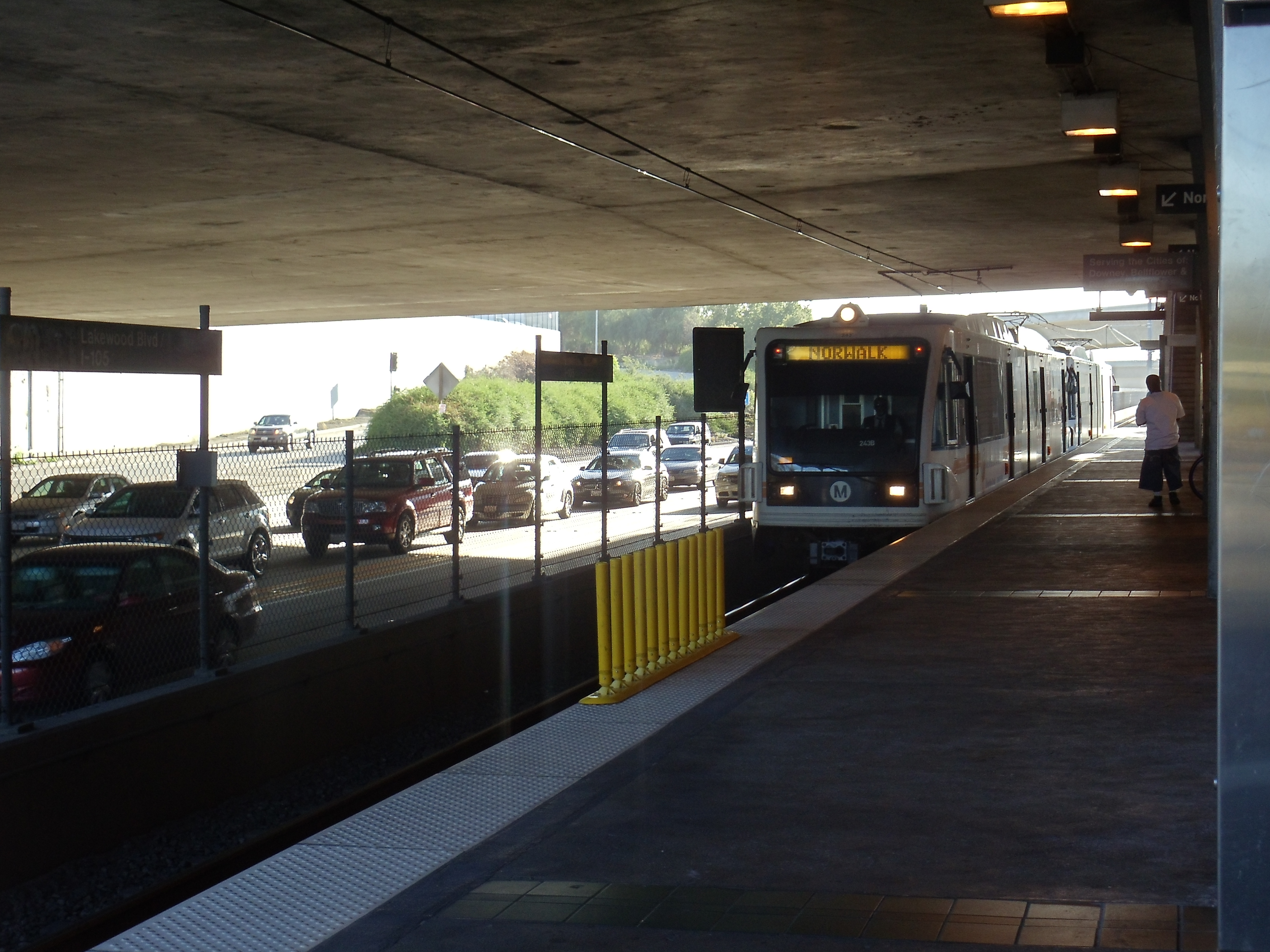
- Lakewood station platform

General information
- Location: 12801 Lakewood Boulevard; Downey, California
- Coordinates: 33.9131°N 118.1405°W
- Owner: Los Angeles County Metropolitan Transportation Authority
- Platforms: 1 island platform
- Tracks: 2
- Connections: DowneyLINK; Long Beach Transit; Los Angeles Metro Bus

Construction
- Structure type: Freeway median, below-grade
- Parking: 403 spaces
- Cycle facilities: Racks and lockers
- Accessible: Yes

History
- Opened: August 12, 1995
- Former names: Lakewood Blvd/I-105 (1995–2000)

Passengers
- FY 2025: 1,247 (avg. wkdy boardings)

Services
Preceding station	Metro Rail	Following station
Lynwood toward LAX	C Line	Norwalk Terminus
Location

Lakewood Boulevard station is a below-grade light rail station on the C Line of the Los Angeles Metro Rail system. It is situated in the median of Interstate 105 (Century Freeway), below Lakewood Boulevard, after which the station is named. The station serves the city of Downey, California and opened as part of the Green Line on August 12, 1995.

The station was initially named Lakewood Blvd/I-105 but was later simplified to Lakewood Bl in 2000.

== Service ==
=== Hours and frequency ===
C Line service hours are approximately from 4:00 a.m. until 12:30 a.m. daily. Trains operate every 10 minutes throughout the day. Night and early morning weekend service is every 20 minutes.

=== Connections ===
As of June 6, 2025, the following connections are available:

- DowneyLINK: Southeast, South
- Long Beach Transit: 22
- Los Angeles Metro Bus: 117, 265, 266
