= Cockatoo Inn =

American hotel

Coordinates: 33.929817°N 118.350907°W

General information
- Location: Hawthorne, California
- Opened: 1958

Design and construction
- Developer: Andrew Lococo

Other information
- Number of rooms: 210 guest rooms

Cockatoo Inn was a hotel located on Hawthorne Boulevard and Imperial Highway in Hawthorne, California. The hotel was a popular destination in Los Angeles, serving US politicians, Hollywood actors, and members of the American Mafia. Cockatoo gained a reputation for being a gathering place for the elites in Los Angeles. The 210-room hotel featured intricate European furnishings, grand banquet halls, and an eccentric bar.

The hotel was founded in 1958, when a notorious American Mafia member Andrew Lococo built the hotel. Cockatoo Inn quickly became popular in Los Angeles. Guests of the hotel include John F. Kennedy, Robert F. Kennedy, Marilyn Monroe, and Mickey Rooney. An acting US Attorney identified Andrew Lococo as a prominent member of the American Mafia, making Lococo subject to federal investigations. Shortly afterward he was convicted of horse race-fixing, gambling violations, and perjury in a grand trial. Lococo proceeded to sell the hotel two years after his conviction. The hotel business continued to prosper, but by the late 1980s, the hotel began to suffer and became bankrupt in 1991. The next corporation to buy the bankrupt hotel was also unable to make the Cockatoo Inn profitable and sold the property to investors from China. The Cockatoo inn soon fell into disarray and shut down, prompting Chinese investors to sell the property to a property developer.

After purchasing the property in 2004, the developer demolished the hotel with plans for a new three hotel complex to replace it. The project was met with neighborhood appeals however, the developer was able to approve the project and pushed forward with its construction. During the complex's construction in 2009, the hotel industry in Los Angeles was suffering from average daily rates for hotels falling 15% in just 2009 alone. Despite obstacles of slow construction, franchising regulations, economic downturn, and financing troubles the developer completed the three hotels. In 2019 plans were announced for an expansion of the complex for a total of seven hotels and 760 rooms. The complex currently includes a Candlewood Suites and Holiday Inn Express, with the "Cockatoo" name having been adopted by a Comfort Inn across from the complex on Acacia Avenue.
