= Century Boulevard =

Street in Los Angeles County, USA

- Maintained by: Los Angeles County Department of Public Works
- Nearest metro station: Aviation/Century station
- West end: SR 1 near Sepulveda Blvd and World Way
- Major junctions: I-405 near Inglewood; I-110 in Los Angeles
- East end: Alameda Street in Watts

Century Boulevard is a major east–west thoroughfare in the southern portion of Los Angeles, California. Century Boulevard acts as a continuation of Tweedy Boulevard at Alameda Street in South Gate in its east end (Tweedy Boulevard in its east end starts slightly east of Atlantic Avenue), and ends in the west at the passenger terminals at Los Angeles International Airport. Due to its correspondence with the airport, the road has been dubbed "The Gateway to Los Angeles".

== Route Description ==
Century Boulevard passes through Watts, Harbor Gateway, South Los Angeles, Inglewood, and Westchester. Upon its connection to the LAX terminal loop, Century Boulevard becomes World Way North, and upon leaving LAX it originates from World Way South.

The grid plan of Los Angeles and its numbering of east–west thoroughfares would call for a 100th Street in the position of Century Boulevard, thus spawning the more colloquial title.

Century Boulevard marks the southern border for Jesse Owens Park, the Hollywood Park Casino, SoFi Stadium, the Hollywood Park neighborhood development, and The Village at Century strip mall in Inglewood.

=== Public transit ===
Metro Local Line 117 operates on Century Boulevard.

Aviation/Century station is an elevated Los Angeles Metro Rail station located at the intersection of Aviation and Century boulevards that opened on November 3, 2024, serving the C and K lines.

== Future Developments ==
=== Potential Redevelopment ===
Los Angeles officials have expressed a desire to renovate Century Boulevard. In November 2017, city planners published a concept draft that outlined the potential renovation of 1.5 miles of the thoroughfare near LAX in order to modernize the area and to make the route more pedestrian-friendly. The project would potentially see the widening of sidewalks and bike lanes, the addition of new trees and landscaping, and the renovation of structures considered unsightly.
