= Redondo Beach station =

Light rail station in Redondo Beach, California

Redondo Beach
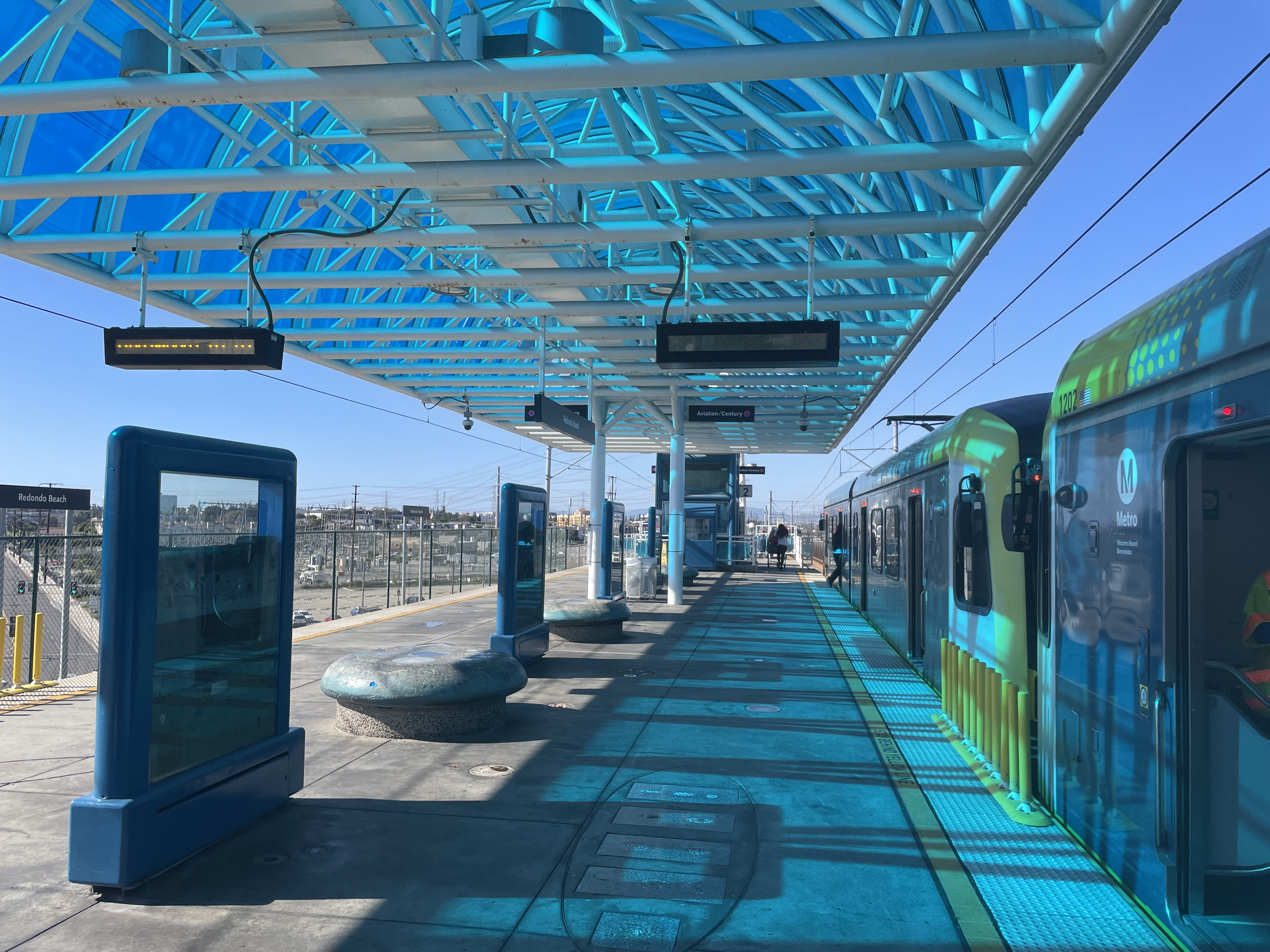
- Redondo Beach station platform in November 2024

General information
- Location: 5301 Marine Avenue; Redondo Beach, California
- Coordinates: 33.8947°N 118.3693°W
- Owner: Los Angeles County Metropolitan Transportation Authority
- Platforms: 1 island platform
- Tracks: 2
- Connections: Beach Cities Transit; GTrans; Lawndale Beat; LADOT Commuter Express; Los Angeles Metro Bus

Construction
- Structure type: Elevated
- Parking: 340 spaces
- Cycle facilities: Racks and lockers
- Accessible: Yes

History
- Opened: August 12, 1995
- Former names: Marine Ave/Redondo Beach Ave (1995–2003)

Passengers
- FY 2025: 846 (avg. wkdy boardings)

Services
Preceding station	Metro Rail	Following station
Douglas toward Expo/Crenshaw	K Line	Terminus
Former services
Preceding station	Metro Rail	Following station
Terminus	C Line	Douglas toward Norwalk
Location

Redondo Beach station is an elevated light rail station on the K Line of the Los Angeles Metro Rail system. It is located over Marine Avenue on the border between Hawthorne and Redondo Beach, California, and is named for the latter. It opened with the commencement of Green Line service on August 12, 1995. The station has been served by the K Line since a restructuring in November 2024.

The station is currently the southern terminus of the K Line. An extension beyond Redondo Beach into Torrance is in the planning stages.

The station was initially named Marine Ave/Redondo Beach Ave but was later simplified to Redondo Beach in 2003.

The train platform, currently suitable for two-car trains, is planned to be lengthened by 2028 to accommodate longer three-car trains.

== Service ==
=== Hours and frequency ===
K Line service hours are approximately from 4:30 a.m. until 12:00 a.m. daily. Trains operate every 10 minutes throughout most of the day. Trains run every 20 minutes after 8:00 p.m. every day and before 8:00 a.m. on weekends.

=== Connections ===
As of June 6, 2025, the following connections are available:

- Beach Cities Transit: 102
- GTrans: 1X
- Lawndale Beat: Express, Residential
- LADOT Commuter Express: 438 (select trips), 574
- Los Angeles Metro Bus: 215

== Notable places nearby ==
The station is within walking distance of the following notable places:

- Northrop Grumman Space Park campus
