= Athens, California =

Unincorporated community in California, United States

- Unincorporated community
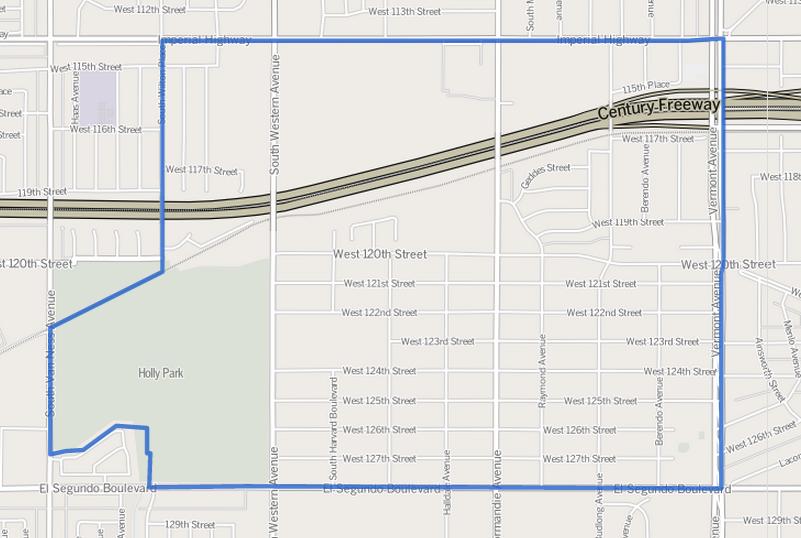
- Athens neighborhood, Los Angeles Times

- Location in Los Angeles County
- Coordinates: 33°55′12″N 118°16′52″W
- Country: United States
- State: California
- County: Los Angeles
- Elevation: 171 ft (52 m)
- Time zone: UTC−8 (Pacific (PST))
  - Summer (DST): UTC−7 (PDT)
- GNIS feature ID: 1660279

Athens is an unincorporated community in the South Los Angeles region of Los Angeles County, California, United States, numbering 9,101 people in the 2000 census. It is the home site of Los Angeles Southwest College.

== Geography ==
Athens is south of unincorporated Westmont, east of Hawthorne, north of Gardena, and west of the Broadway-Manchester neighborhood of the city of Los Angeles. It is bounded on the north by Imperial Highway, on the east by Vermont Avenue, on the south by El Segundo Boulevard and the Gardena city limits and on the west by South Van Ness Avenue, South Wilton Place and the Hawthorne city boundary. It is bisected by the Interstate 105 Century Freeway.

The ZIP Code is 90044; the community is in telephone area code 323 and area code 310. It lies at an elevation of 171 feet (52 m).

== Demographics ==
In the 2000 census, there were 9,101 people in Athens' 1.33 square miles, which put its population density at 6,829 per square mile, "among the lowest densities for South L.A.," according to the Los Angeles Times. The ethnic distribution was black, 54.3%; Latino, 39.78%; Asian, 2.9%; white, 1.2%, and other, 2%. Twenty-eight percent of the residents were foreign born, average for both South Los Angeles and for the county as a whole. Mexican and Belizean were the most common ancestries, and Mexico and El Salvador were the most common foreign places of birth.

The median income was $48,824 in 2008 dollars, which was considered high for the South Los Angeles region. One-eighth of residents aged 25 or older had a college degree, which was "high for South L.A. but low for the county," the Times reported. The median age was 27, "about average for South L.A. but young for the county," and the percentage of residents ages 10 or younger was among the county's highest. There were 520 families headed by single parents, low for South L.A. but high for the county.

The percentage of veterans who served during the Vietnam War was among the county's highest.

== Government ==
The Los Angeles County Sheriff's Department operates the South Los Angeles station in Athens, at 1310 West Imperial Highway.

== See also ==
- West Athens
