= Beach Cities Transit =

Los Angeles mass transportation service

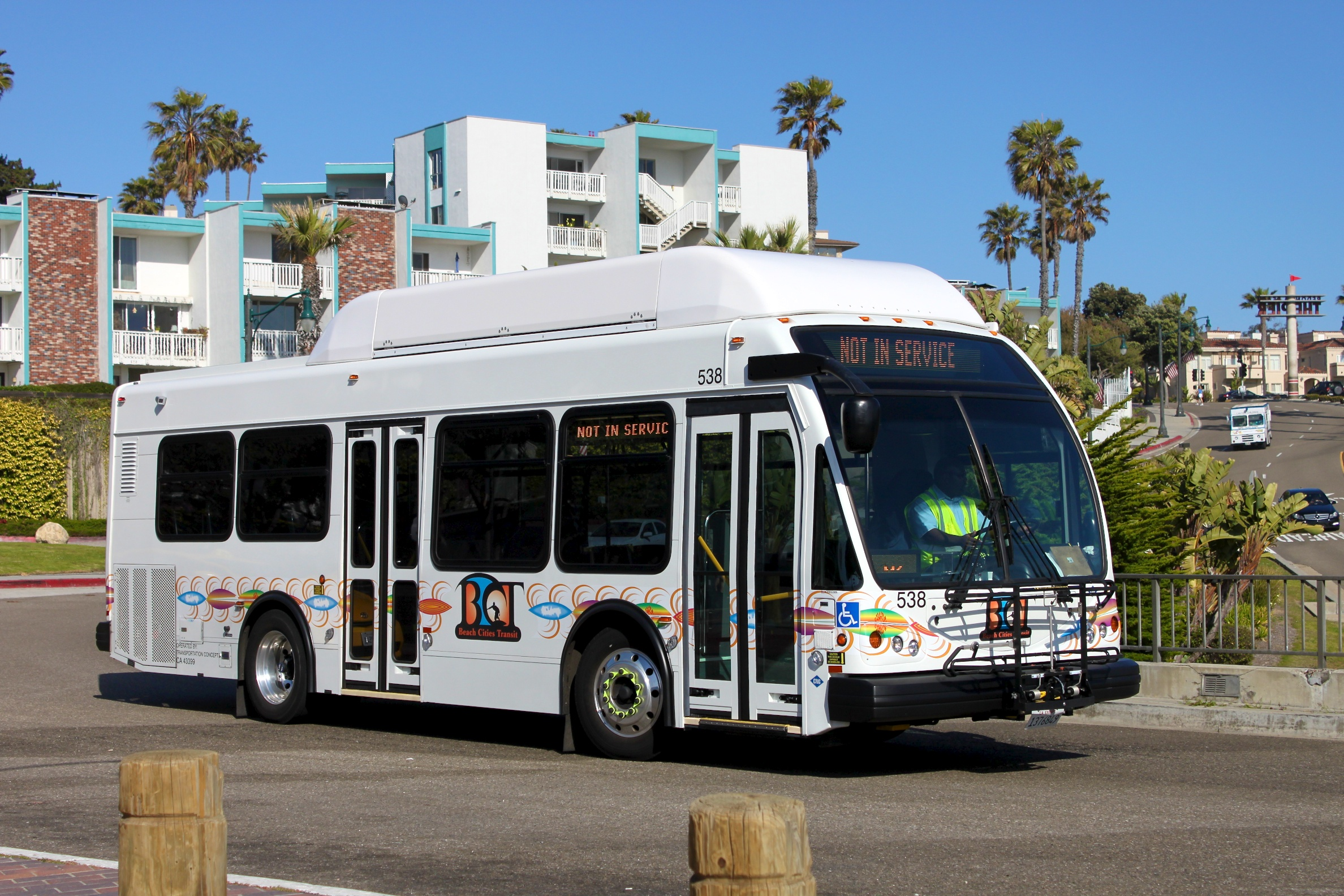
- Beach Cities Transit bus at the Redondo Beach Pier, the transfer point for the system
- Parent: City of Redondo Beach
- Founded: 2005
- Headquarters: 415 Diamond Street; Redondo Beach, California
- Service area: Beach Cities, Los Angeles County
- Service type: Public transport bus
- Routes: 2
- Fleet: 12 buses
- Daily ridership: 800 (weekdays, Q2 2026)
- Annual ridership: 248,600 (2025)
- Fuel type: CNG
- Website: beachcitiestransit.org

Beach Cities Transit (BCT) is a public transit service operated through inter-municipal cooperation among the cities of Redondo Beach, Hermosa Beach, and Manhattan Beach, with additional service to El Segundo. The agency operates two bus routes that provide local service and connections to the broader Greater Los Angeles transportation network. Established in 2005, Beach Cities Transit was created to assume operation of lower-ridership routes previously managed by Los Angeles Metro.

In 2025, the system recorded an annual ridership of 248,600, with an average of approximately 800 weekday boardings as of the second quarter of 2026.

== Routes ==
Route	Terminals		Via	Notes
102	Hawthorne; Redondo Beach station	Redondo Beach; Palos Verdes Bl & Via Valencia	Vail Av, Rindge Ln, Catalina Av	Serves South Bay Galleria, Redondo Beach Transit Center, Redondo Union High School, and Redondo Beach Pier
109	Los Angeles; LAX/Metro Transit Center	Redondo Beach; Redondo Beach Pier	Catalina Av, Hermosa Av, Manhattan Av, Highland Av	Serves Aviation/Century station, Aviation/Imperial station, Plaza El Segundo, Douglas station, and Manhattan Village

== Bus fleet ==
Make/Model	Fleet numbers	Year
ENC E-Z Rider II BRT CNG 32'	544–546	2015
Ford E450	547–548	2019
ENC E-Z Rider II BRT CNG 32'	549	2022
ENC E-Z Rider II BRT CNG 32'	551–552	2022
ENC E-Z Rider II BRT CNG 32'	553–557	2023
