= Metro Micro =

On-demand microtransit service operated by LA Metro

- Parent: Los Angeles Metro
- Founded: 2020
- Locale: Los Angeles County, California
- Service area: Multiple defined service zones
- Service type: On-demand microtransit
- Fleet: Small vans and shuttles
- Operator: Metro (LACMTA)
- Website: micro.metro.net

Metro Micro is an on-demand shared‐ride microtransit service operated by the Los Angeles Metro across multiple zones in Los Angeles County, California. The service was launched in 2020 as a pilot project to serve “first/last mile” trips and provide mobility in areas where conventional bus routes are less frequent or efficient.

== Service and Zones ==
Metro Micro serves eight primary zones, including Watts/Compton; LAX/Inglewood; El Monte; North Hollywood/Burbank; Highland Park/Eagle Rock/Glendale; Altadena/Pasadena/Sierra Madre; Northwest San Fernando Valley; and UCLA/Westwood/VA Medical Center.

== History ==
In 2019 Metro launched a pilot called the Mobility on Demand (MOD) program in partnership with the ride-share provider Via Transportation. That pilot operated in zones including North Hollywood, El Monte and Compton, and was funded in part by a grant from the Federal Transit Administration.

The first service zones of Metro Micro launched on December 14, 2020, in the Watts/Willowbrook and LAX/Inglewood service areas. The service operated using Metro-managed small vans, via app or call-in booking, and used the introductory US $1 fare in each zone for the first six months. In January 2021 Metro announced expansion of Metro Micro to three additional zones: Compton/Artesia, El Monte, and North Hollywood/Burbank. In June 2021 Metro Micro added zones in Highland Park/Eagle Rock/Glendale and Altadena/Pasadena/Sierra Madre.

== Reception ==
As of August 2026, the Metro Micro app had over 1100 reviews and a 4.7-star rating.

The program faced significant criticism regarding its cost-effectiveness, ridership levels, and long-term sustainability. According to Metro board reports, systemwide weekday ridership in mid-2024 averaged about 2,305 rides per day, less than half of Metro’s internal target of 5,090 daily rides.

== See also ==
- Microtransit
- Los Angeles Metro
