= C Line (Los Angeles Metro) =

Light rail line in Los Angeles County, California

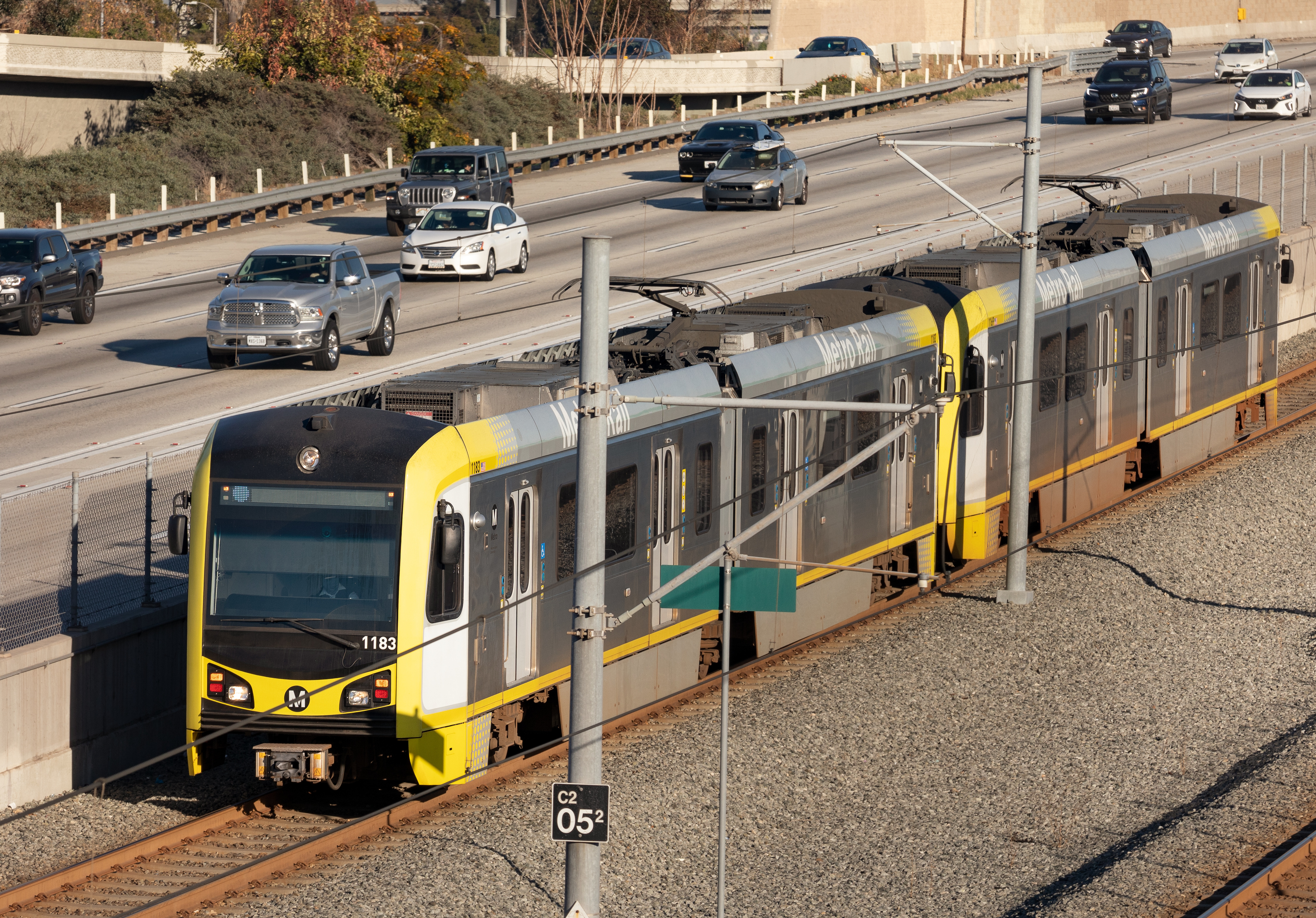
- C Line train operating in the median of Interstate 105, which it parallels for most of its length. Photographed in 2021

Overview
- Other name: Green Line (1995–2020)
- Owner: Los Angeles Metro
- Line number: 803
- Termini: LAX/Metro Transit Center; Norwalk
- Stations: 12
- Website: metro.net/riding/guide/c-line

Service
- Type: Light rail
- System: Los Angeles Metro Rail
- Depot: Division 16 (Westchester)
- Rolling stock: Kinki Sharyo P3010 or Siemens P2000 running in 1 or 2 car consists
- Daily ridership: 21,631 (weekday, April 2026) ▲
- Ridership: 6,237,378 (2025) ▼8.9%

History
- Opened: August 12, 1995; 31 years ago

Technical
- Line length: 17.8 mi (28.6 km)
- Number of tracks: 2
- Character: Fully grade-separated, mostly in freeway median
- Track gauge: 4 ft 8 1/2 in (1,435 mm) standard gauge
- Electrification: Overhead line, 750 V DC
- Operating speed: 65 mph (105 km/h) (max.); 34.4 mph (55.4 km/h) (avg.)
Route map
C Line highlighted in green

The C Line (formerly the Green Line from 1995 to 2020) is a 17.8-mile (28.6 km) light rail line running between the Los Angeles neighborhood of Westchester and the city of Norwalk in southwestern Los Angeles County, California. It is one of six lines forming the Los Angeles Metro Rail system and opened on August 12, 1995. Along the route, the line also serves the cities of Downey, Hawthorne, and Lynwood, as well as several unincorporated communities in the South Los Angeles region including Athens, Del Aire, and Willowbrook.

For a majority of its route, the C Line runs within the median strip of Interstate 105. When built, its western segment was an elevated leg that diverted from the 105 to the southwest and terminated in Redondo Beach. In 2024 and 2025, the western end of the C Line was reconfigured, and is now routed northwards to LAX/Metro Transit Center.

== Service description ==
=== Route description ===
The C Line begins at-grade at the LAX/Metro Transit Center, shared with the K Line, where passengers can transfer to any one of several bus lines from different operators, including LAX Shuttle Route M, which provides free service to the Los Angeles International Airport (LAX) terminals. SkyLink, which will give a connection to the airport's terminals, is scheduled to begin service at the LAX/Metro Transit Center in 2026, replacing the temporary shuttle. The line heads south, quickly reaching Aviation/Century station, elevated above Century Boulevard. The line then descends into a mixture of tunnels and open trenches as it passes close to the LAX runways. The line then reemerges on embankments and bridges before splitting from the K Line at an elevated wye west of Aviation/Imperial station. From here, the C Line heads east in the median of Interstate 105, with a connection to the J Line bus rapid transit line at Harbor Freeway station. It then continues to a major transfer connection at Willowbrook/Rosa Parks station (transfer point to the light rail A Line). Finally, the line terminates in Norwalk, at Norwalk station, just east of Interstate 605. A non-revenue connector at Willowbrook/Rosa Parks station allows trains to transfer to A Line tracks for maintenance and other non-revenue operations.

Passengers can reach Downtown Los Angeles by connecting with the bus rapid transit J Line at Harbor Freeway station, the light rail A Line at Willowbrook/Rosa Parks station, or Metro Bus Express route 460 at Norwalk station. Metrolink service to Downtown Los Angeles via Union Station, Perris, and Oceanside, as well as other cities in Orange County and Riverside County, can be accessed from the C by transferring to Norwalk Transit route 4 and disembarking at Norwalk/Santa Fe Springs station.

The C Line, while officially a "light rail" line, has also been described as a "light metro" by transit experts due to its complete grade separation.

=== Hours and frequency ===
C Line service hours are approximately from 4:00 a.m. until 12:30 a.m. daily. Trains operate every 10 minutes throughout the day. Night and early morning weekend service is every 20 minutes.

Time	4a–7a	8a–8p	9p–12a
Weekdays	10		20
Weekends/Holidays	20	10	20

=== Speed ===
The C Line is the fastest light rail line in the Los Angeles Metro Rail network because trains can operate at speeds up to 65 miles per hour (105 km/h) for most of their route as trains run in the median of the I-105 freeway, not having at-grade street service like other lines such as the A Line. The line has complete grade separation, relatively long station spacing, and a primarily straight alignment.

The C Line takes 34 minutes to travel 19.5 miles (31.4 km), at an average speed of 34.4 miles per hour (55.4 km/h). This is 43% faster than the A Line, and 81% faster than the E Line.

=== Station listing ===
The C Line consists of the following 12 stations (from west to east):

Station	Date Opened	City/Neighborhood	Major connections and notes
LAX/Metro Transit Center	June 6, 2025	Los Angeles (Westchester)	LAX via LAX Shuttle; SkyLink (2026); SoFi Stadium via shuttle bus
Aviation/Century	November 3, 2024	Los Angeles (Westchester)	K Line
Aviation/Imperial	August 12, 1995	Los Angeles (Westchester)	Park and ride: 435 spaces
Hawthorne/Lennox	August 12, 1995	Hawthorne	Park and ride: 362 spaces
Crenshaw	August 12, 1995	Hawthorne	Park and ride: 506 spaces
Vermont/Athens	August 12, 1995	Athens	Park and ride: 155 spaces
Harbor Freeway	August 12, 1995	South Los Angeles	Park and ride: 253 spaces
Avalon	August 12, 1995	South Los Angeles	Park and ride: 160 spaces
Willowbrook/Rosa Parks	July 14, 1990 (Note: The station opened with the A Line on July 14, 1990, while the C Line platform opened on August 12, 1995.)	Willowbrook	Park and ride: 234 spaces
Lynwood	August 12, 1995	Lynwood	Park and ride: 635 spaces
Lakewood Boulevard	August 12, 1995	Downey	Park and ride: 403 spaces
Norwalk	August 12, 1995	Norwalk	Park and ride: 1,759 spaces

=== Ridership ===
Annual ridership
Year	Ridership	%±
2009	11,721,935	—
2010	12,241,883	+4.4%
2011	12,808,530	+4.6%
2012	13,931,830	+8.8%
2013	13,499,453	−3.1%
2014	12,967,235	−3.9%
2015	12,058,903	−7.0%
2016	10,980,323	−8.9%
2017	9,961,716	−9.3%
2018	9,510,211	−4.5%
2019	9,131,806	−4.0%
2020	4,757,506	−47.9%
2021	4,430,484	−6.9%
2022	5,670,634	+28.0%
2023	6,262,604	+10.4%
2024	6,845,764	+9.3%
2025	6,237,378	−8.9%
Source: Metro

== History ==
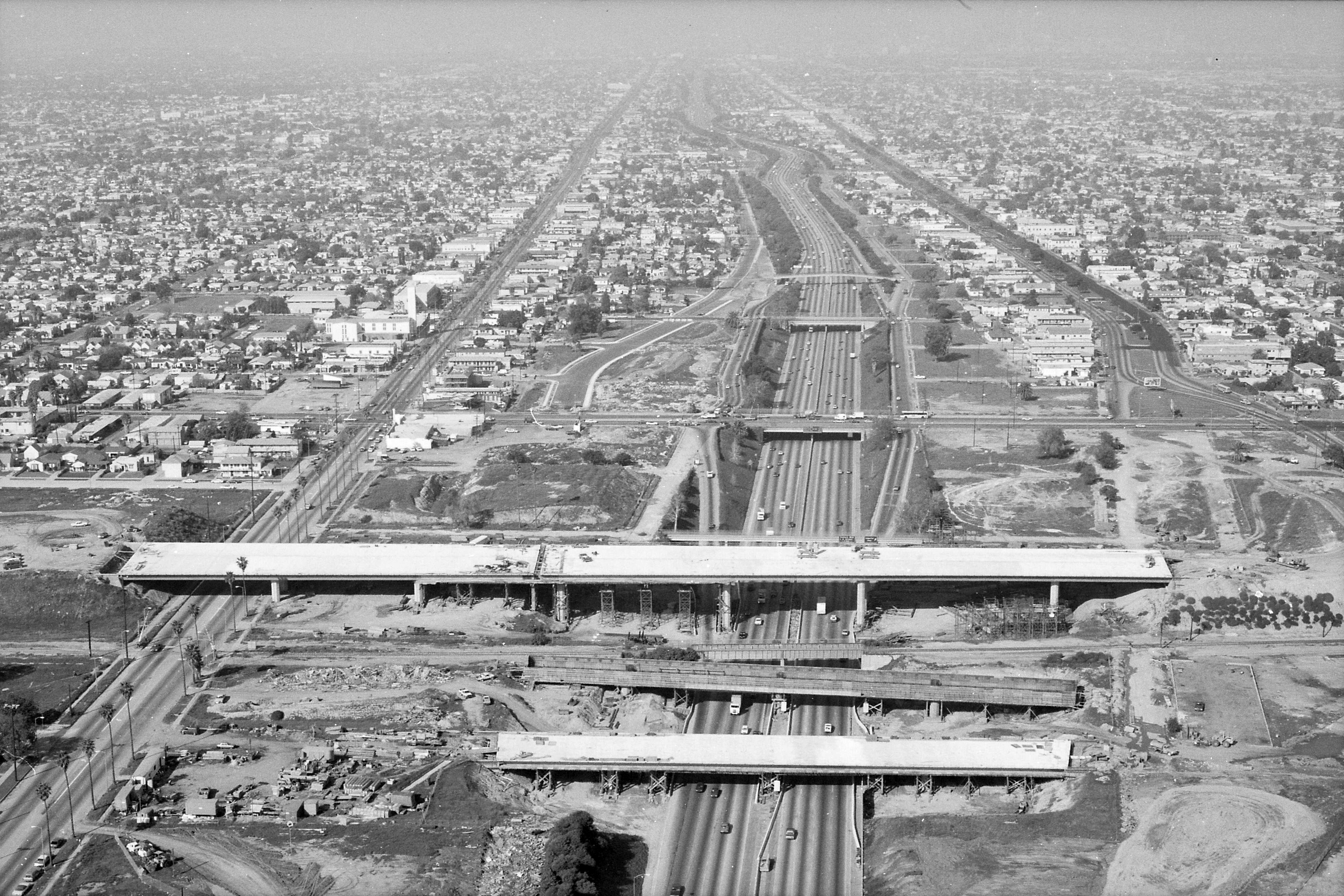
The C Line was built with the construction of the I-105 freeway.

In 1972, a lawsuit was filed against Caltrans over the construction of Interstate 105, and a preliminary injunction issued by the judge halted construction on the freeway until the project complied with the National Environmental Policy Act of 1969 and the California Environmental Quality Act of 1970. In 1979, Caltrans signed a consent decree to allow construction of the fiercely opposed Century Freeway (Interstate 105), which included provisions for a transit corridor in the freeway's median as a way to help communities impacted by the new freeway.

Construction began in 1987 on the corridor as a light rail line, envisioned as a connection with the bedroom communities in the Gateway Cities along the Century Freeway with the then-burgeoning aerospace center in El Segundo. The section in El Segundo would be fully elevated and follow the route of the Harbor Subdivision.

From the beginning of the project, several compromises were made. Because Caltrans dropped a plan for the freeway to cross through Norwalk to Interstate 5, the line was denied a connection to the then-new Norwalk/Santa Fe Springs Metrolink station. Additionally, although planners planned to add a spur to LAX, they did not include it in the initial project over fears that commuters would not use the line if they had to go through the airport on the way to work. The proposed extension to LAX's Lot C was further complicated by concerns from the Federal Aviation Administration that the overhead lines of the rail line would interfere with the landing paths of airplanes. Amid ambivalence at LAX and L.A. City Hall, the plans to extend the line to the airport were shelved.

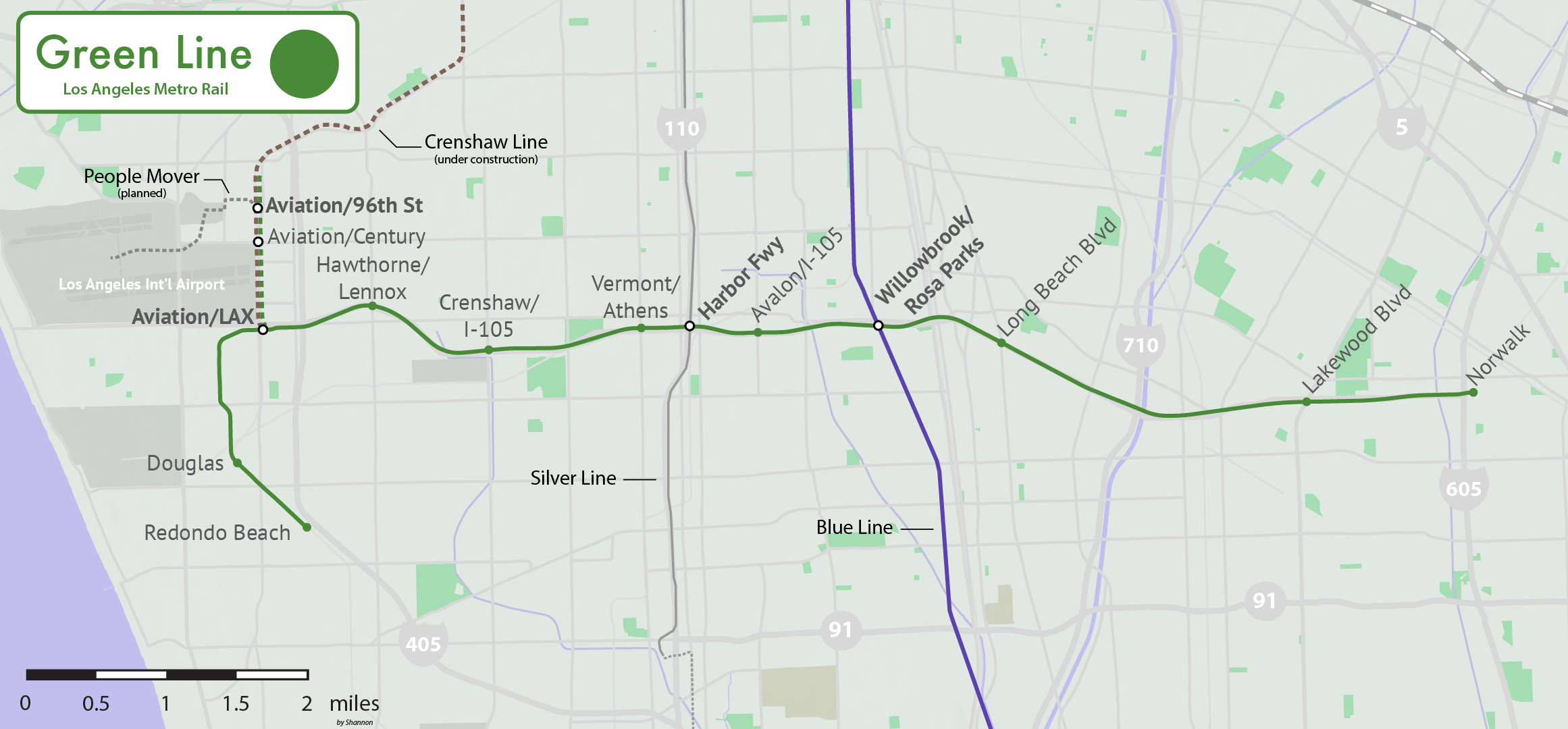
Map showing C Line route and stations pre-November 2024

The line opened on August 12, 1995, more than a year late and $950 million over budget. By that time, the Cold War was over, and the aerospace sector in El Segundo was hemorrhaging jobs. The collapse of jobs in the area and the compromises made during construction limited the line's utility, earning it the nickname "the train to nowhere."

When the C Line began service, it operated with only one-car trains. However, since its opening, ridership continued growing steadily, peaking at nearly 13 million riders in 2014, prompting Metro to operate two-car trains. The increase was driven by the 5,100 park-and-ride spaces and slowing traffic on the 105 freeway. Ridership on the C Line has not been as high as the A Line, although it did have higher ridership than the L Line (then known as the Gold Line) until 2013. Regardless, Metro can only operate two-car trains on the C Line, since the five Metro-built stations west of the freeway only have room for two-car trains.

One of the lessons learned from the line, and the Harbor Transitway built at the same time, was that freeway median stations offer a poor rider experience, requiring customers to descend from bridges or climb stairs from dimly lit underpasses to isolated stations in the middle of a noisy and exhaust-ridden freeway. While stations generally have elevators as a necessary accessibility accommodation, these sometimes fail, and have been known for having sanitation issues; escalators are also often out for maintenance or, with the C Line in particular, only available downward.

=== Overhead line replacement ===
Beginning on August 12, 2023, Los Angeles Metro began a multi-phased project to gradually replace the aging overhead lines on the almost 30-year-old C Line. This will involve closures on segments of the line at different time periods. The first of these closures ran from August 12 to August 19, between Redondo Beach and Hawthorne/Lennox stations, and August 20 to September 24 between Redondo Beach and Aviation/Imperial stations. Service was replaced in the meantime by temporary bus shuttles.

=== Integration with the K Line ===
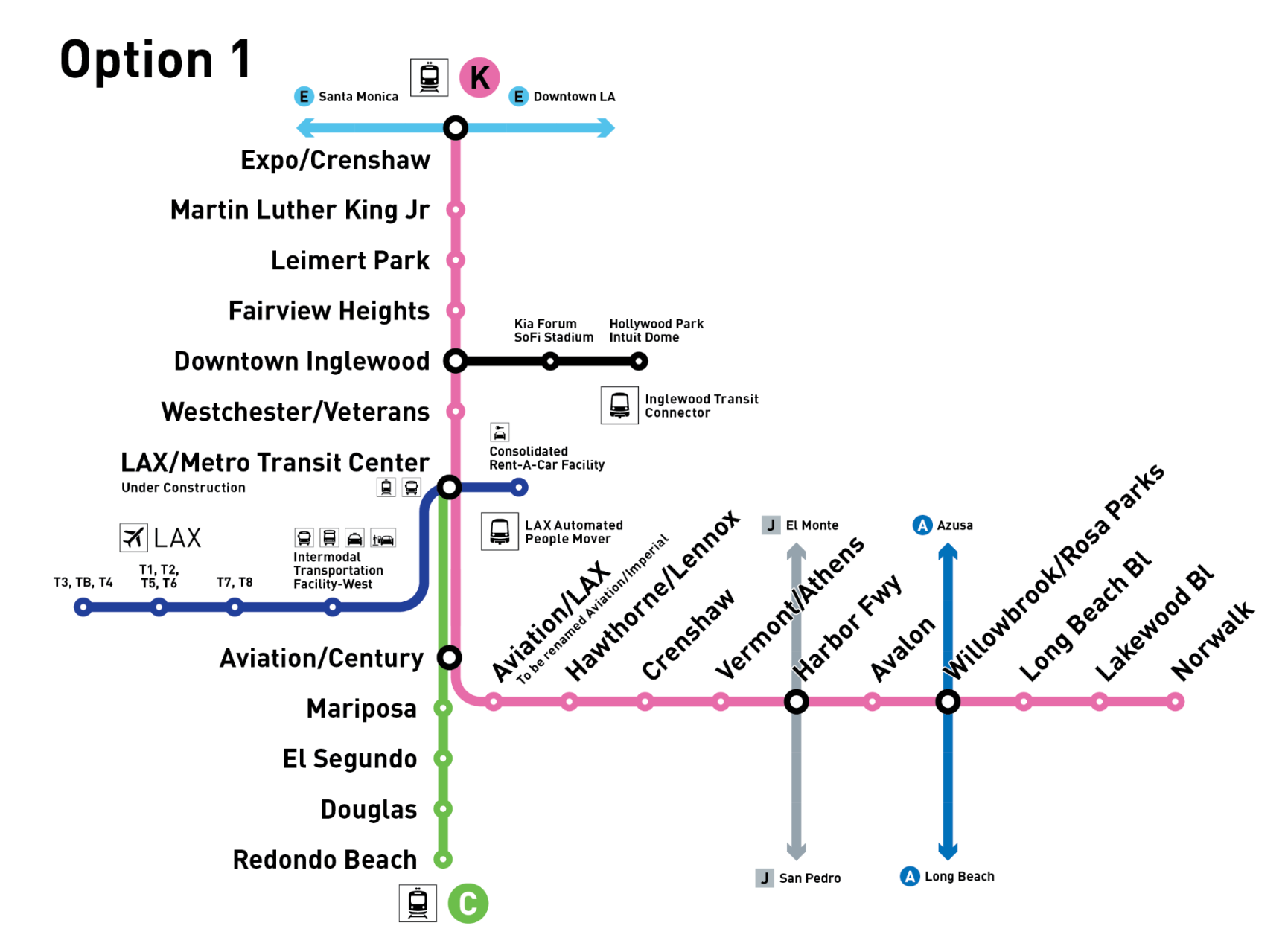
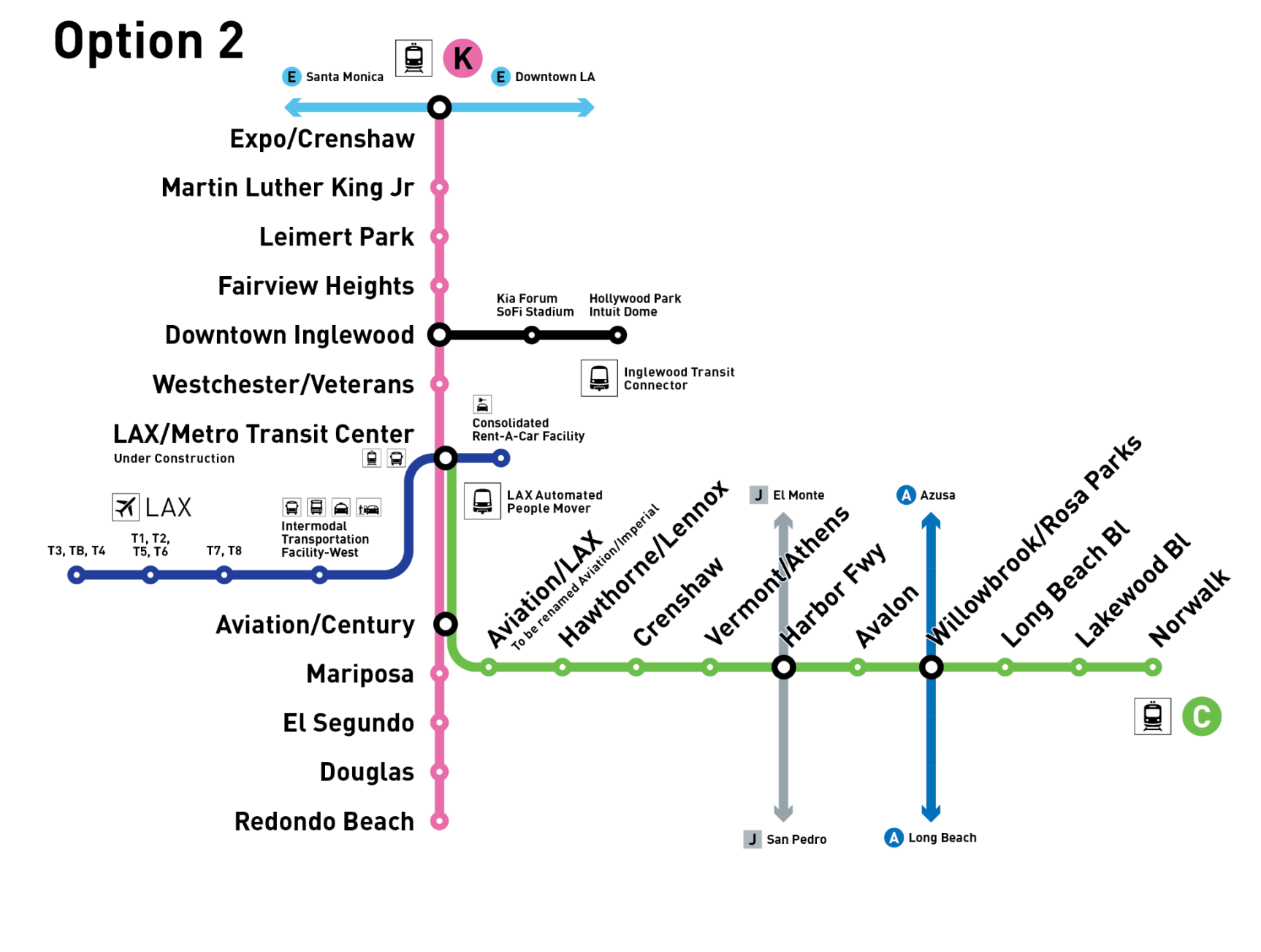
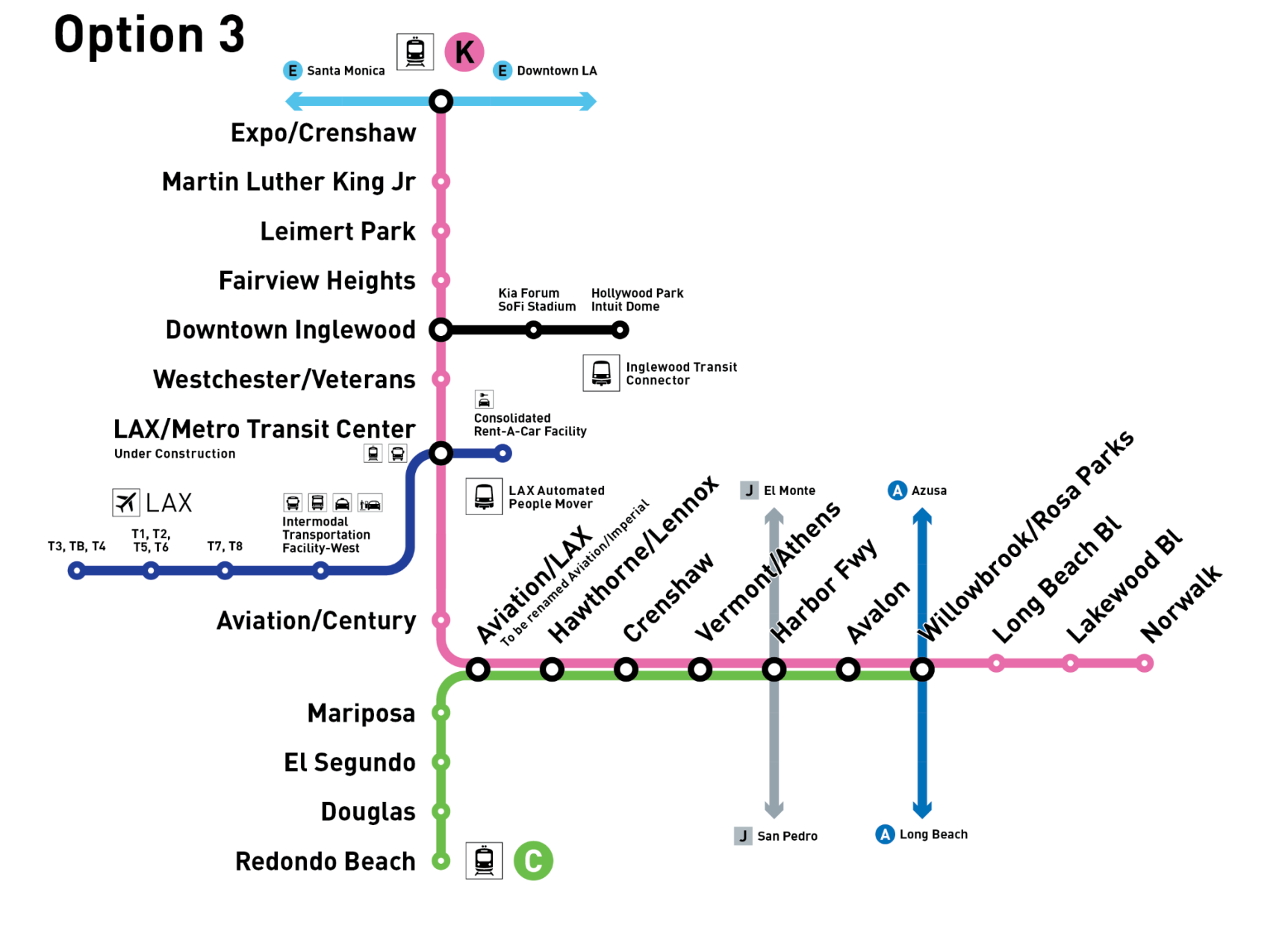
Graphics depicting the three options for proposed C and K Line service patterns

As the Crenshaw/LAX Line project was planned and built over the course of the 2010s, varying service patterns were proposed for integrating the new line into the rest of the system, all of which have involved sharing trackage and infrastructure facilities with the existing C Line. Although some early proposals would've sent trains through all three directions of the wye that would connect the existing C Line with the new segment, this was rejected by Metro because it would cause too much wear and tear on the track switch mechanisms.

The debate over service patterns proved somewhat contentious, as the final pattern had to balance the needs of riders, operational needs, and the political constituencies of Metro's board members. In 2018, with the new line then scheduled to open within the year, the Metro Board of Directors overrode a recommendation by operations staff that would've had a single line operating between Expo/Crenshaw and Norwalk station. Passengers from the Redondo Beach area would have been served by a shuttle to the LAX area, where they would need to transfer to another train to continue east or north. Instead, board members approved a one-year pilot of a configuration that would combine an Expo-to-Norwalk line with another line that would connect Redondo Beach with Willowbrook/Rosa Parks station, allowing transfers to the A and J Lines. This plan would have incurred higher operating expenses, but board members argued it would retain better transfer opportunities for South Bay residents.

Ongoing construction delays led to a reassessment of that plan in 2022. Metro recommended public outreach aimed at reformulating the operating plan before the connection to the C Line opened; in March 2023, Metro indicated that it would recommend Option 2 in the figure above, in which the new line, now designated K Line would run north–south from Expo/Crenshaw to Redondo Beach, and the C Line would run from Norwalk to LAX. On June 22, 2023, Metro's board of directors officially approved the implementation of this option based on staff recommendation and public opinion.

In preparation for the opening of the LAX/Metro Transit Center, Metro initiated a service change on November 3, 2024, with the opening of Aviation/Century station. The C Line was redirected from its alignment west of Aviation/Imperial station running to Redondo Beach station to Aviation/Century station. The segment between Aviation/Century station and Redondo Beach station became part of the K Line.

== Future developments ==
=== Eastern extension to Norwalk/Santa Fe Springs station ===
The C Line's eastern terminus is 2.8 miles (4.5 km) west of the Norwalk/Santa Fe Springs Metrolink station, which is served by several Metrolink lines and sees heavy use. Norwalk/Santa Fe Springs is also a proposed station on the California High-Speed Rail project. Bus service, primarily via Norwalk Transit line 4, is provided between the Metrolink station and the C Line terminus. Still, schedules are not coordinated with the C Line's arrivals. While plans exist to close the gap, available Measure M funding allows the operation to start in roughly 2052.

=== Southeast Gateway Line interchange station ===
A new infill station is planned to be constructed between Lynwood and Lakewood Boulevard in order to provide an interchange with the forthcoming Southeast Gateway Line. It is expected to open with the new service in 2035.

== Operations ==
On Metro Rail's internal timetables, the C Line is numbered line 803.

=== Maintenance ===
The C Line is operated by Division 16 (Southwestern Yard) in Westchester, directly east of the northern runways of Los Angeles International Airport (LAX), and adjacent to the LAX/Metro Transit Center. Trains access the yard via crossovers from the north and south sides of the yard.

=== Rolling stock ===
As of 2024, the Kinki Sharyo P3010 is the only rolling stock to serve the C Line. Trains run in one- or two-car consists. Metro is planning to extend the platforms at Aviation/Imperial station to be able to eventually accommodate up to three-car trains.

At the time the Green Line opened, the line used a fleet of Nippon Sharyo P2020 light rail vehicles, which were very similar to the older Nippon Sharyo P865 vehicles used on the Blue Line (now known as A Line). In late 2001, the P2020 fleet was transferred to the Blue Line, and the Green Line received new Siemens P2000 railcars that operated on the line until their removal in 2024 and subsequent transfer to the A Line. Since 2019, newer Kinki Sharyo P3010 trains were added to the Green Line alongside P2000s to supplement the fleet and have been used since then.

== Incidents ==
- On February 22, 2015, a train near the Hawthorne/Lennox station struck and killed a man who was trespassing on the tracks.
- On August 24, 2018, a collision involving a tanker truck on the westbound lanes of I-105 between Vermont Avenue and Crenshaw Boulevard exploded with flames that crawled onto the tracks and damaged the catenary system. The rail line and the freeway were closed for cleanup and repairs.
