= Norwalk station (Los Angeles Metro) =

Los Angeles Metro Rail station

Norwalk
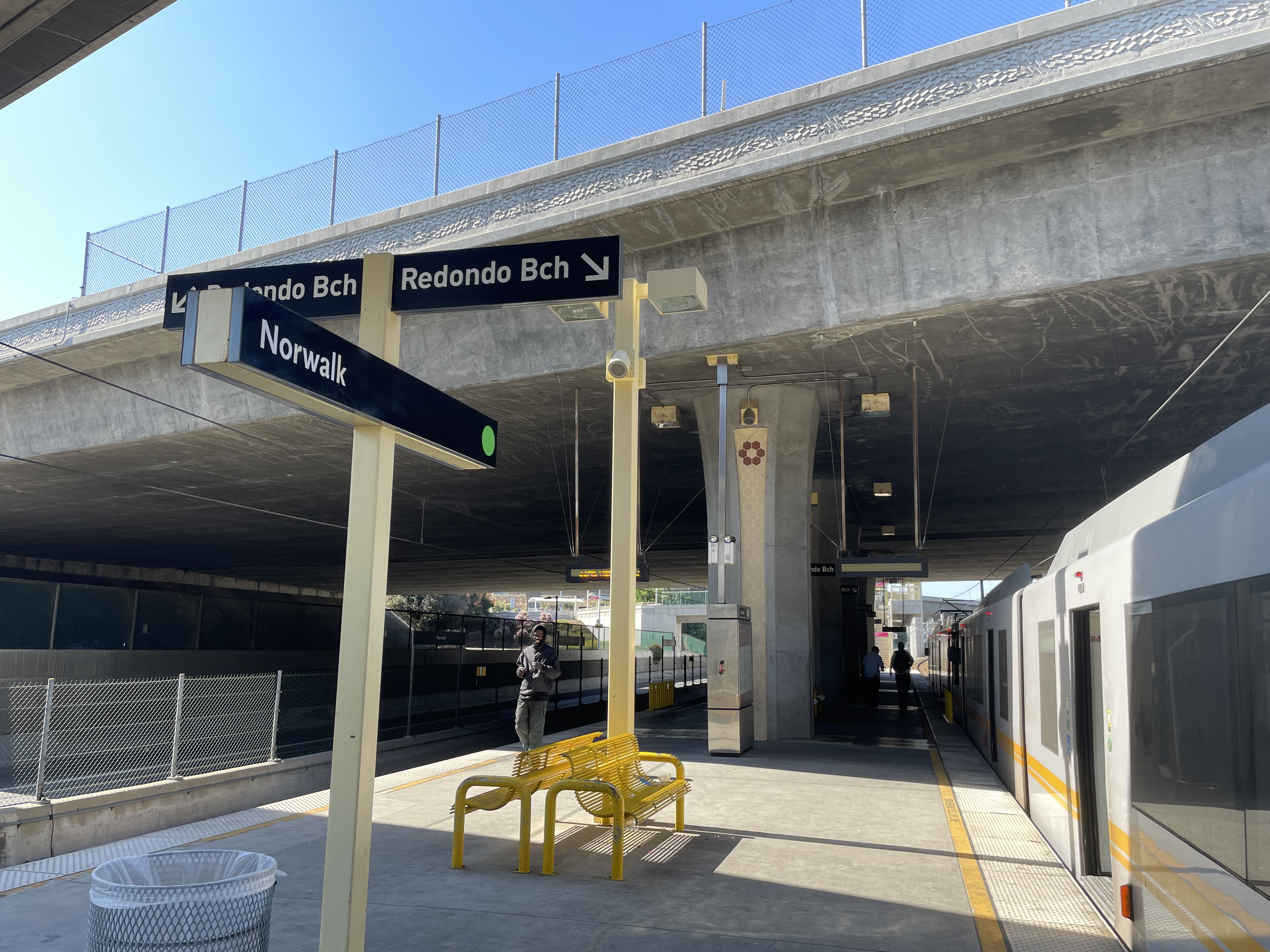
- Norwalk station platform in 2023, before service changes removed Redondo Beach station from the C Line route.

General information
- Location: 12901 Hoxie Avenue; Norwalk, California
- Coordinates: 33.9139°N 118.1050°W
- Owner: Los Angeles County Metropolitan Transportation Authority
- Platforms: 1 island platform
- Tracks: 2
- Connections: Long Beach Transit; Los Angeles Metro Bus; Norwalk Transit

Construction
- Structure type: Freeway median, below-grade
- Parking: 1,759 paid spaces
- Cycle facilities: Racks and lockers
- Accessible: Yes

History
- Opened: August 12, 1995
- Former names: I-605/I-105

Passengers
- FY 2025: 2,141 (avg. wkdy boardings)

Services
Preceding station	Metro Rail	Following station
Lakewood Boulevard toward LAX	C Line	Terminus
Location

Norwalk station is a below-grade light rail station on the C Line of the Los Angeles Metro Rail system. It is located in the median of Interstate 105 (Century Freeway), below Interstate 605 (San Gabriel River Freeway) in the city of Norwalk, California, after which the station is named. It is currently the eastern terminus of the C Line.

The original name for the station was I-605/I-105 for its location but was later changed to Norwalk.

This station serves as a major transfer point in the Metro system. Across the bridge from the station, Metro Express route 460 offers service to the Disneyland Resort and Knott's Berry Farm in Orange County, Express route 577 provides service to both El Monte station and California State University, Long Beach.

One of the major criticisms of the C Line is that it doesn't extend to Metrolink's Norwalk/Santa Fe Springs station, located 2.8 miles (4.5 km) to the east. The gap creates a major inconvenience for anyone wanting to take rail transit between Orange County or the Inland Empire and western Los Angeles County. Norwalk Transit route 4 connects the two stations, but the trip takes 15 to 25 minutes, and travel times can be longer because of connection times between buses or traffic, with buses lacking dedicated lanes. Originally, the Century Freeway was to start at Interstate 5, but a lawsuit from the City of Norwalk prevented the construction of this right of way and the city council refused to permit Caltrans to close roads in the right of way, a right granted under the California Streets and Highways Code. Norwalk Transit route 4 connects the two stations. The California State Legislature has expressed little interest in closing one of the largest gaps in the regions transportation system.

Parking is $3 per day.

== Service ==
=== Hours and frequency ===
C Line service hours are approximately from 4:00 a.m. until 12:30 a.m. daily. Trains operate every 10 minutes throughout the day. Night and early morning weekend service is every 20 minutes.

In a 2023 pilot project, Norwalk became one of four Metro stations to offer public restrooms.

=== Connections ===
As of June 6, 2025, the following connections are available:

- Long Beach Transit: 172, 173
- Los Angeles Metro Bus: 111, 115, 120, 125, Express 460, Express 577
- Norwalk Transit: 2, 4, 5, 7

== Future plans ==
There have been persistent proposals for a 2.8-mile (4.5 km) eastward extension of the line from Norwalk station to reach the Norwalk/Santa Fe Springs station, serviced by Metrolink. This project carries a proposed cost of $321 million for an elevated viaduct, or $360 million for a subway. Since an initial Environmental Impact Review (EIR) in 1993, there has been no solid progress for this proposal. The Los Angeles County Metropolitan Transportation Authority (Metro) 2009 Long Range Transportation Plan (LRTP) lists funding priorities to build through year 2040 – the C Line east extension is not a funded project in the Metro's 2009 LRTP and is instead in the Tier 1 Strategic Unfunded Plan. In 2016, voters passed Measure M, a sales tax increase making local funds available for the extension with a projected opening of 2046.

== Station artwork ==
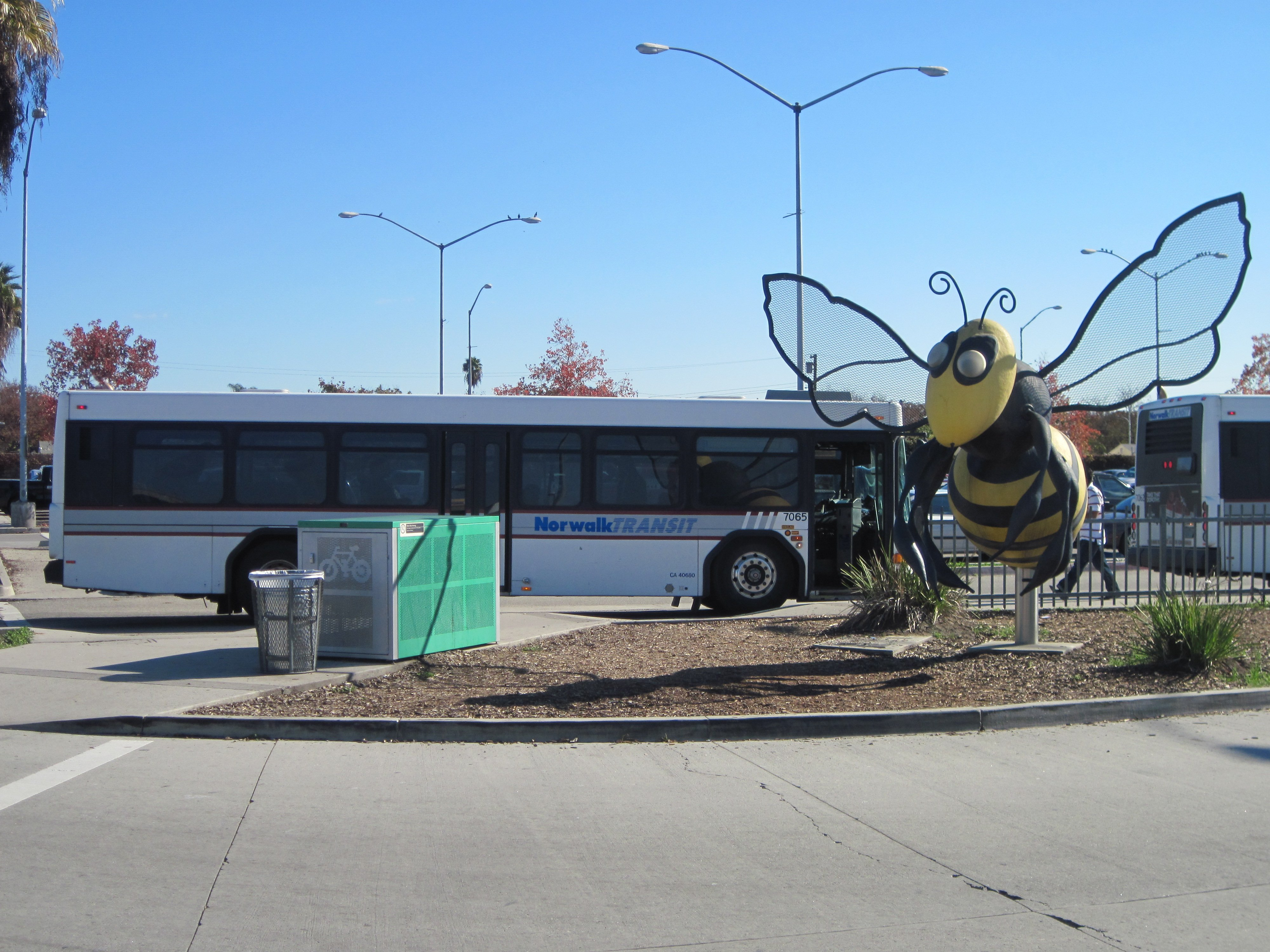
A freestanding bee sculpture greets visitors to the upper level of the station.

The station has a bee theme, a nod to the indigenous place names for Norwalk, Sejat, Sejatngna and Sehat, which meant “Place of the Bees.”

Artist Meg Cranston used this historical reference as her inspiration to create her artworks collectively called “Suka: Place of the Bees.” The art pieces include a large bee sculpture for the entry to the parking lot, smaller bee sculptures are beneath the station canopies, a bee motif silkscreened onto the elevator glass, honeycomb pattern (hexagonal) wall tiles and paving patterns, and bronze tiles on the platform reference ancient coins which featured the honeybee.
