= Harbor Subdivision =

Railway right-of-way in Los Angeles County, California

Overview
- Status: Some segments operational, others abandoned or converted to light rail and rail trails
- Owner: Los Angeles Metro
- Locale: Southwestern Los Angeles County, California, USA

Service
- Operator: BNSF Railway

Technical
- Line length: 53 mi (85 km)
- Track gauge: 4 ft 8 1/2 in (1,435 mm) standard gauge
Route map

The Harbor Subdivision is a single-track main line of the BNSF Railway which stretches 53 miles (85 km) between rail yards near downtown Los Angeles and the ports of Los Angeles and Long Beach across southwestern Los Angeles County. It was the primary link between two of the world's busiest harbors and the national rail network. Mostly displaced with the April 15, 2002 opening of the more direct Alameda Corridor, the Harbor Sub takes a far more circuitous route from origin to destination, owing to its growth in segments over the decades. The subdivision was built in this fashion beginning in the early 1880s to serve the ports and the various businesses that developed along it.

== History ==
=== Santa Fe Railway ===
First built to serve Port Ballona and Santa Monica located at what is now Playa del Rey, the construction of a larger, better port at Redondo Beach brought an extension to that city in 1888. The early 1900s would see that project eclipsed with the coming of the San Pedro Outer Breakwater and the Port of Los Angeles. By the early 1920s, owing to the development of the area's oil fields, the Harbor Sub was extended through Torrance, Wilmington and on to Long Beach. Development of Watson Yard in Wilmington completed the line. Other than sidings at "Lairport" (along the eastern edge of Los Angeles International Airport next to Aviation Boulevard at 120th Street), "Ironsides" in Torrance and the line's longest siding at the Alcoa, also in Torrance, the Harbor Sub is completely single-track without signals, compensated with track warrant control via a local dispatcher.

The line between Lairport and Van Ness was formally abandoned in 2015.

=== Los Angeles Metro Rail system ===
Most of the line was purchased by the Los Angeles County Metropolitan Transportation Authority (Metro) in 1992, and freight rights are retained by BNSF.

Heavy construction began in June 2014 to convert a portion of the Harbor Subdivision to light rail use as a segment of the K Line, part of the Los Angeles Metro Rail system. The Harbor Subdivision over-crossing on Century Boulevard and Aviation Boulevard was demolished in late-July 2014 as part of the construction of the K Line. When completed, it will run from Jefferson Park in the north and link with the Metro C Line at the south end. However with the construction of SkyLink, the K Line opened north from Westchester/Veterans station in October 2022. The remaining two stations Aviation/Century and LAX/Metro Transit Center subsequently opened later in 2024 and 2025, respectively. As a result, the K Line now uses the former C Line segment south to Redondo Beach, which the C Line's terminus is LAX.

A study conducted by Metro examined the feasibility of extending the C Line to Torrance via the Harbor Sub, the creation of a new light rail transit line and even the possibility of a maglev high-speed rail system.

=== Rail to Rail Active Transportation Corridor ===
In May 2022, Metro began construction on the Rail to Rail Active Transportation Corridor Project. The 5.13-mile-long (8.26 km) project uses the portion of the Harbor Subdivision from the K Line's Fairview Heights station to the A Line's Slauson Station, with a connection to the J Line's Slauson Station along the way. The project will remove the existing railroad tracks from the right-of-way and replace them with paths for walking and cycling. The Rail to Rail Active Transportation Corridor Project formally opened on May 17th, 2025.
