= Florence Avenue =

Street in central Los Angeles County and South Los Angeles

- Length: 20.4 mi (32.8 km)
- Location: Los Angeles County, California
- Nearest metro station: : Florence station; Fairview Heights station; Westchester/Veterans station; Downtown Inglewood station
- West end: Manchester Boulevard in Inglewood
- Major junctions: I-405 in Inglewood; I-110 in Los Angeles; I-710 in Bell; SR 19 in Downey; I-605 in Santa Fe Springs; I-5 in Santa Fe Springs
- East end: Telegraph Road in South Whittier

Florence Avenue is a major east–west street in central Los Angeles County and South Los Angeles, in Southern California.

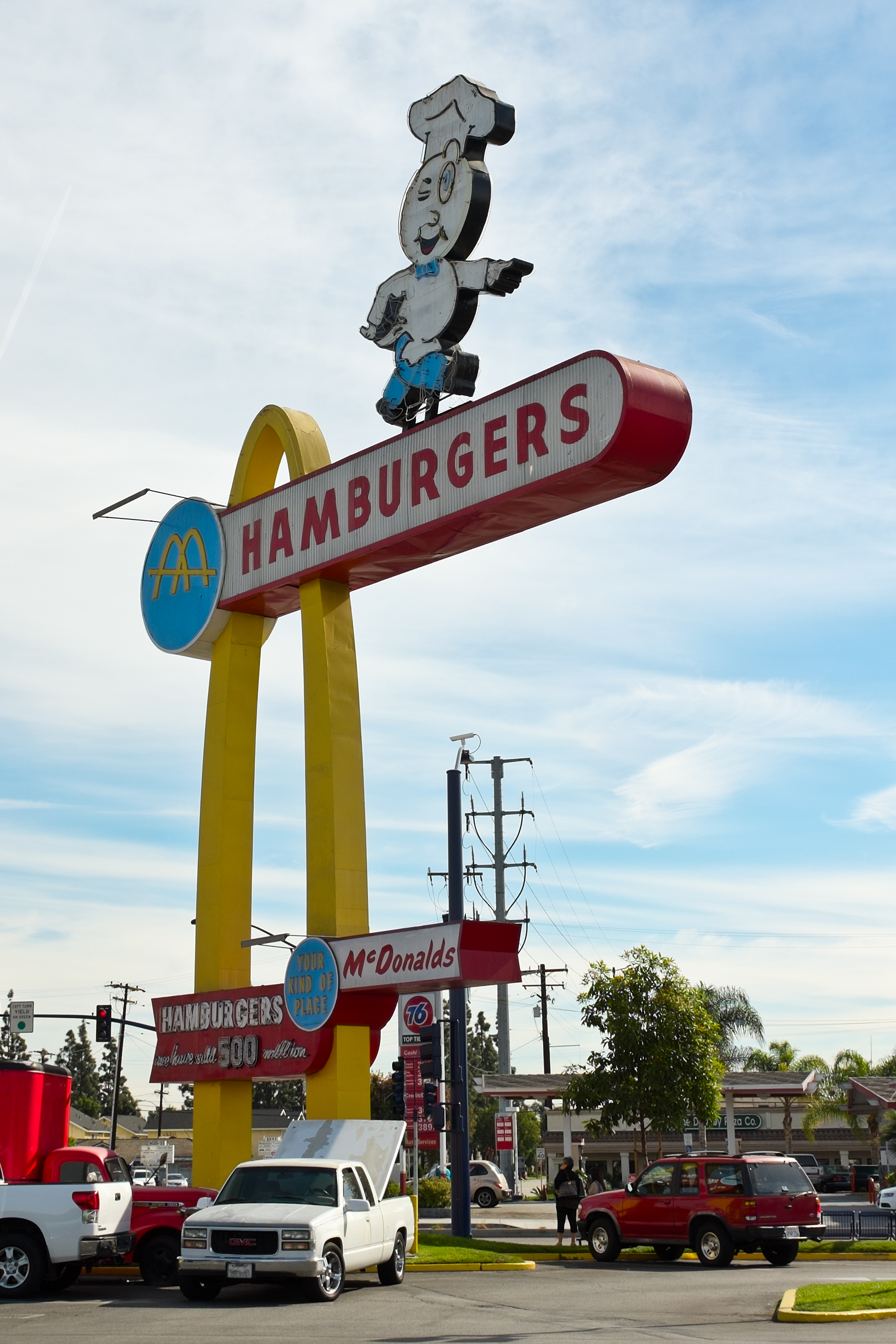
The oldest operating McDonald's is on Florence Ave at Lakewood, in Downey, California.

== Route ==
It is bounded in the east by Mills Avenue at Telegraph Road in Whittier.. At Telegraph Road, it changes to Mills Avenue. West of La Cienega Boulevard, it swerves into Aviation Boulevard, which is a north–south street, in the City of Inglewood.

Florence Avenue runs through the cities of Inglewood, Los Angeles, Huntington Park (where it intersects Pacific Boulevard), Bell, Bell Gardens, Downey, Santa Fe Springs, and unincorporated Los Angeles County bordering the City of Whittier.

Florence Avenue also crosses the San Diego Freeway (Interstate 405), Harbor Freeway (Interstate 110), Long Beach Freeway (Interstate 710), San Gabriel River Freeway (Interstate 605), and Santa Ana Freeway (Interstate 5).

An unconnected portion of Florence Avenue is located in La Habra and has similar west–east coordinates to the main Florence Avenue.

== Public transit ==
Metro Local Lines 111 and 120 run through Florence Avenue; the former runs through most of Florence starting at Studebaker Road and the latter east of Studebaker Road.

=== Rapid transit ===
The Metro A Line light rail serves the Florence station, at the intersection of Graham Avenue and Florence Avenue in the unincorporated community of Florence.

The Metro K Line serves three light rail stations on Florence Avenue, with the Fairview Heights station in Inglewood at West Boulevard near the border adjacent to the Hyde Park neighborhood of Los Angeles, the Downtown Inglewood station at La Brea Avenue in Downtown Inglewood and the Westchester/Veterans station at Hindry Avenue near the border adjacent to the Westchester neighborhood of Los Angeles.

== History ==
The roadway was formerly known as Redondo Boulevard westward from West Boulevard at the Inglewood-Los Angeles city boundary.

Land developer George E. Longan in 1927 established a new business center on Redondo Boulevard near Hillcrest Avenue, Inglewood, a Spanish stucco structure "in harmony with the nearby Inglewood Woman's Club."

In 1931 West Boulevard was extended south to Florence Avenue and intersected Redondo Boulevard at the latter's easterly end.

In 1934, the Los Angeles Times noted that "Florence Avenue runs into Redondo Boulevard." East–west Redondo Boulevard turned north–south to traverse between Inglewood and Redondo Beach.

The intersection of Florence and Normandie is noted for an attack during the 1992 riots in Los Angeles when several black men pulled white driver Reginald Denny from his truck and beat him in the intersection. The attack was televised.
