= Downtown Inglewood station =

Light rail station in Inglewood, California

Downtown Inglewood
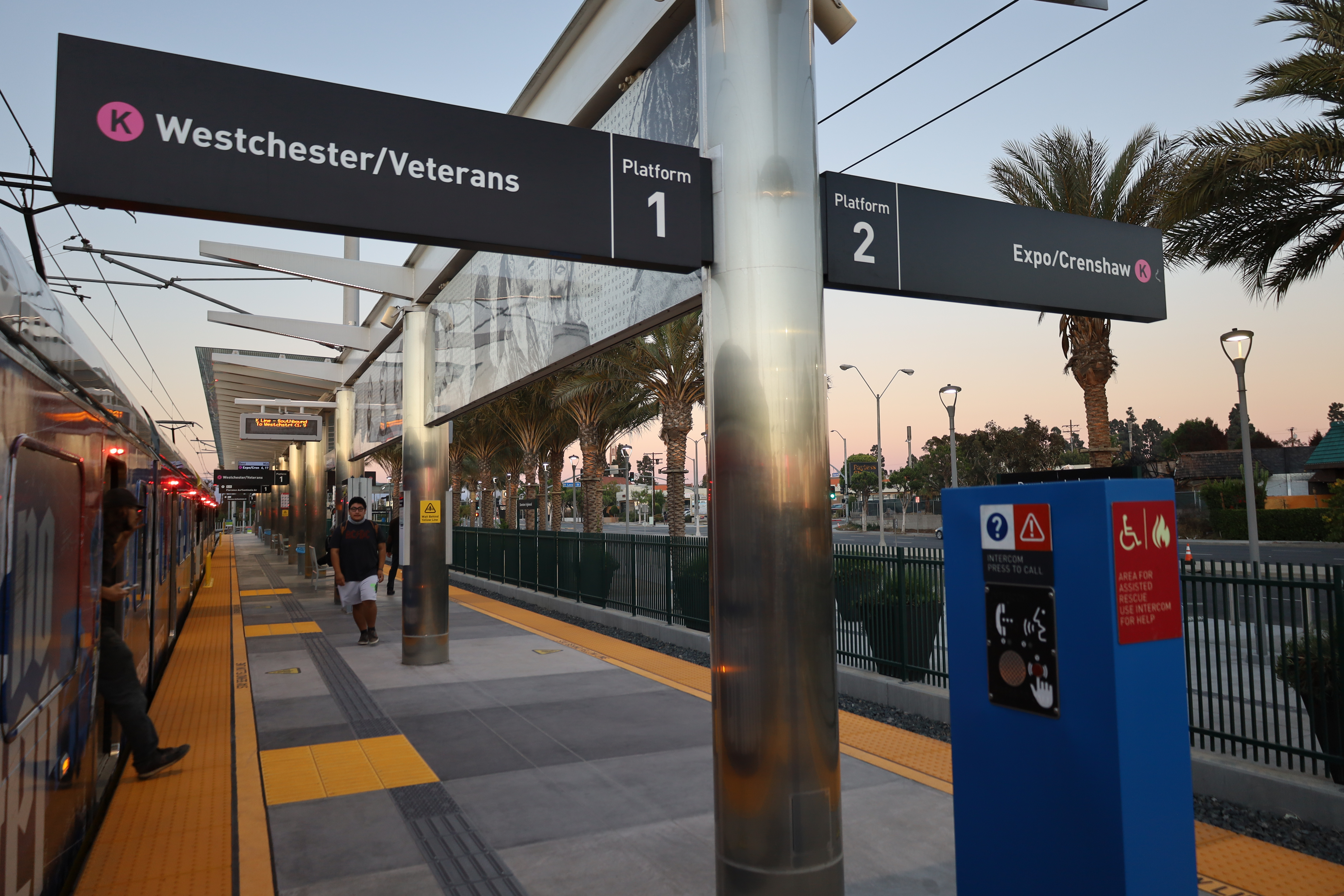
- Downtown Inglewood station platform in 2022

General information
- Location: 321 East Florence Avenue; Inglewood, California
- Coordinates: 33.966996°N 118.351389°W
- Owner: Los Angeles County Metropolitan Transportation Authority
- Platforms: 1 island platform
- Tracks: 2
- Connections: Intuit Dome Shuttle; Los Angeles Metro Bus; Metro Micro; Torrance Transit

Construction
- Structure type: At-grade
- Cycle facilities: 6 racks, 8 lockers
- Accessible: Yes

History
- Opened: October 7, 2022

Passengers
- FY 2026: 563 (avg. wkdy boardings)

Services
| Preceding station | Metro Rail | Following station |
|---|---|---|
| Fairview Heights toward Expo/Crenshaw | K Line | Westchester/Veterans toward Redondo Beach |
Location

Downtown Inglewood station is an at-grade light rail station on the K Line of the Los Angeles Metro Rail system. It is located alongside Florence Avenue between Market and Locust Streets in the central business district of the city of Inglewood, California.

During planning, the station was known as "Florence/La Brea", with Metro adopting the current name in July 2015 in response to local feedback.

The station opened on October 7, 2022. Metro held a ceremonial ribbon cutting ceremony for the station on September 10, 2022.

The station incorporates artwork by the artist Kenturah Davis.

== Service ==
=== Hours and frequency ===
K Line service hours are approximately from 4:30 a.m. until 12:00 a.m. daily. Trains operate every 10 minutes throughout most of the day. Trains run every 20 minutes after 8:00 p.m. every day and before 8:00 a.m. on weekends.

=== Connections ===
As of June 6, 2025, the following connections are available:

- Intuit Dome Shuttle (service to all events at Intuit Dome)
- Los Angeles Metro Bus: 40, 111, 211, 212, 215
- Metro Micro: LAX/Inglewood Zone
- Torrance Transit: 10

== Notable places nearby ==
The station is within walking distance of the following notable places:

- Inglewood City Hall
- Inglewood Courthouse
- Inglewood Public Library (at Inglewood City Hall), with its substantial collection of framed original children's book illustrations
- Inglewood Post Office, a WPA Moderne-style building with a New Deal sculpture, Archibald Garner’s “Centinela Springs” mahogany carving, and the bas relief “Buffalo, Bear, Ram, Lion” (Newell & Peticolas) on the exterior, created 1937
- Market Street
  - Fox Theatre Inglewood
- Centinela Park, including the Aguaje de Centinela monuments
- Helen Lundeberg’s massive WPA-era History of Transportation petrachrome mosaic mural at Grevillea Art Park

Downtown Inglewood station and nearby Fairview Heights station are both within walking distance of the following sporting venues:

- SoFi Stadium
- Intuit Dome
- Kia Forum, commonly known as the Forum
- Hollywood Park Casino, (originally part of Hollywood Park Racetrack (1938–2013), still offers off-track betting on horse races)

== See also ==
- Inglewood Depot (1887–c. 1973)
