= K Line (Los Angeles Metro) =

Light rail line in Los Angeles County, California

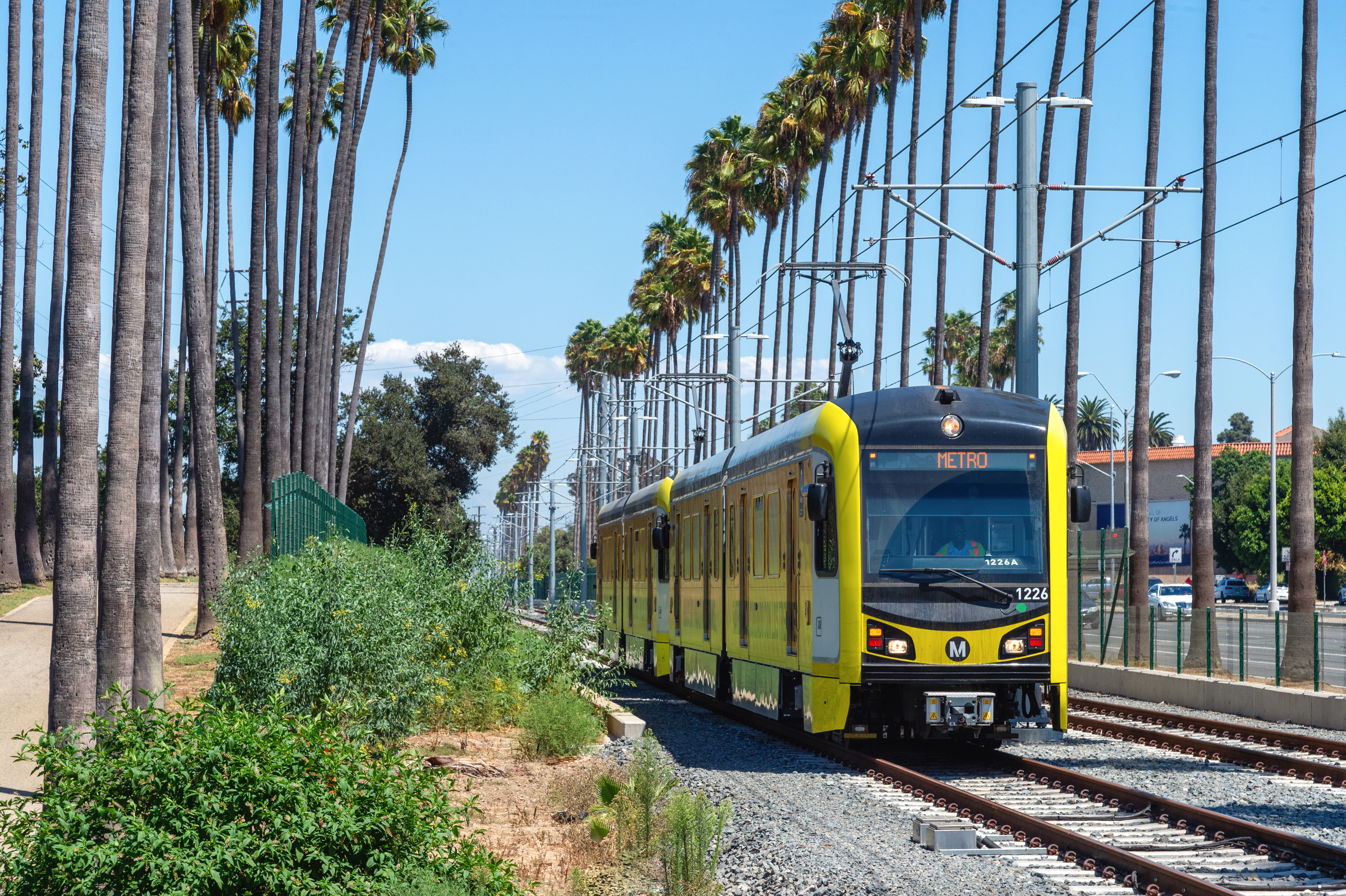
- K Line test train running alongside Florence Avenue in Inglewood, August 2022

Overview
- Other name: Crenshaw/LAX Line
- Owner: Los Angeles Metro
- Line number: 807
- Termini: Expo/Crenshaw; Redondo Beach
- Stations: 13
- Website: metro.net/riding/guide/k-line

Service
- Type: Light rail
- System: Los Angeles Metro Rail
- Depot(s): Division 16 (Westchester); Division 22 (Hawthorne)
- Rolling stock: Kinki Sharyo P3010 or Siemens P2000 running in 1 or 2 car consists
- Daily ridership: 8,866 (weekday, March 2026) ▲
- Ridership: 2,413,581 (2025) ▲94%

History
- Opened: October 7, 2022; 4 years ago

Technical
- Line length: 11 mi (18 km)
- Num of tracks: 2
- Character: At-grade in exclusive right of way, with underground and aerial sections
- Track gauge: 4 ft 8 1/2 in (1,435 mm) standard gauge
- Electrification: Overhead line, 750 V DC
- Operating speed: 55 mph (89 km/h) (max.); 20 mph (32 km/h) (avg.)
Route map
K Line highlighted in pink

The K Line is a light rail line in Los Angeles County, California. It is one of six lines in the Los Angeles Metro Rail system operated by Los Angeles Metro, and is the newest named line in the system, having opened on October 7, 2022. The 11-mile (17.7 km) line runs roughly north-south between Jefferson Park and the city of Redondo Beach, passing through the neighborhoods of Westchester, South Los Angeles, and the cities of Inglewood and El Segundo. It also provides service to the Los Angeles International Airport through the LAX/Metro Transit Center.

As part of service changes implemented on November 3, 2024, in preparation for the opening of the LAX/Metro Transit Center, the segment of the C Line west of Aviation/Imperial station became part of the K Line.

== Service description ==
=== Route description ===
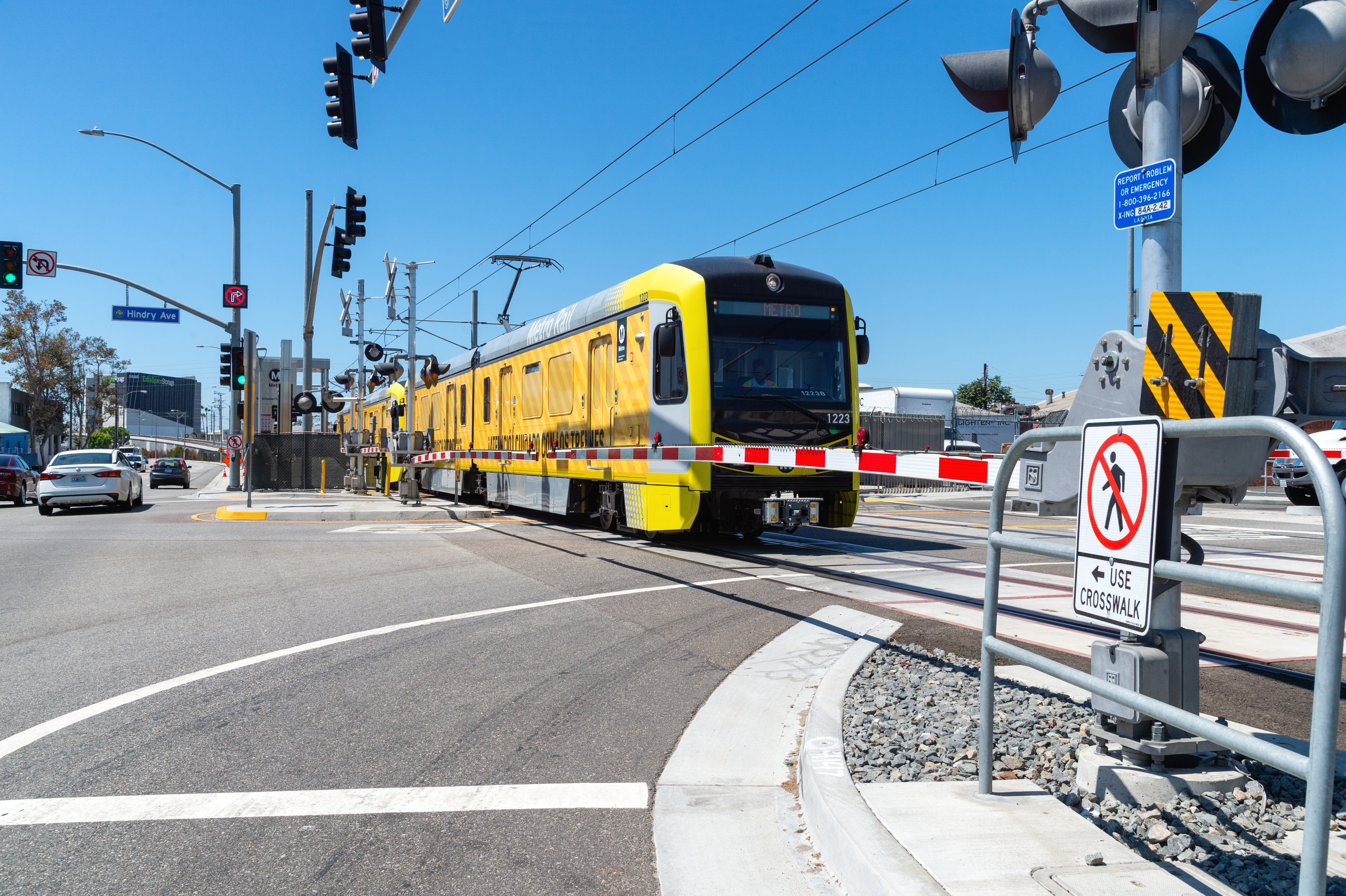
South of Fairview Heights station, the K Line runs along the Harbor Subdivision right of way

The northern terminus is at Expo/Crenshaw station, a transfer point to the E Line. The K Line station here is underground and does not provide a track connection to the at-grade E Line. Provisions are in place to allow the line to extend further north. The route follows Crenshaw Boulevard from Exposition Boulevard south to 67th Street. It travels underground in a one-mile (1.6 km) deep-bore tunnel, which transitions into an at-grade segment in the median of Crenshaw Boulevard (between 48th and 59th Streets) where trains run synchronized to existing traffic signals. From 59th and 67th Streets, the line returns underground into a shallow cut-and-cover tunnel for a half-mile (0.8 km).

South of there, the route emerges from the tunnel and enters the Harbor Subdivision right of way, which runs parallel to Florence Avenue and Aviation Boulevard. The line mostly operates at-grade in this exclusive right-of-way, briefly transitioning onto elevated viaducts to cross over major thoroughfares including La Brea Avenue, Interstate 405 (I-405), and Manchester Avenue. Near 96th Street, the K Line serves the LAX/Metro Transit Center, the western terminus of the C Line, which will function as a transfer point to the future SkyLink. Continuing south, the C and K lines cross over Century Boulevard before briefly entering an open trench as they pass close to the LAX runways. The lines eventually reach a wye above Imperial Highway west of Aviation/Imperial station, where the C Line splits off to Norwalk. The K Line then heads roughly south on an elevated structure through El Segundo before ending at Redondo Beach station.

=== Hours and frequency ===
K Line service hours are approximately from 4:30 a.m. until 12:00 a.m. daily. Trains operate every 10 minutes throughout most of the day. Trains run every 20 minutes after 8:00 p.m. every day and before 8:00 a.m. on weekends.

Time	4–7a	8a–8p	9p–12a
Weekdays	10		20
Weekends/Holidays	20	10	20

=== Station listing ===
The K Line serves 13 stations. The following is the complete list of stations, from north to south:

Station	Opened	City (Neighborhood)	Major connections and notes
Expo/Crenshaw	October 7, 2022	Los Angeles (Jefferson Park)	Park and ride: 450 spaces (closed Sunday)
Martin Luther King Jr.	October 7, 2022	Los Angeles (Baldwin Hills/Crenshaw Manor)	
Leimert Park	October 7, 2022	Los Angeles (Leimert Park)	
Hyde Park	October 7, 2022	Los Angeles (Hyde Park)	
Fairview Heights	October 7, 2022	Inglewood	Park and ride: 200 spaces
Downtown Inglewood	October 7, 2022	Inglewood	
Westchester/Veterans	October 7, 2022	Los Angeles (Westchester)	
LAX/Metro Transit Center	June 6, 2025	Los Angeles (Westchester)	LAX via LAX Shuttle; SkyLink (2026); SoFi Stadium via shuttle bus
Aviation/Century	November 3, 2024	Los Angeles (Westchester)	C Line
Mariposa	August 12, 1995 (Note: The station opened with the C Line on August 12, 1995 and became part of the K Line on November 3, 2024.)	El Segundo	
El Segundo	August 12, 1995	El Segundo	Park and ride: 93 spaces
Douglas	August 12, 1995	El Segundo	Park and ride: 30 spaces
Redondo Beach	August 12, 1995	Hawthorne and Redondo Beach (Note: The station straddles two cities. The north end of the station is in the city of Hawthorne, and the south end of the station is in the city of Redondo Beach.)	Park and ride: 450 spaces

=== Ridership ===
Annual ridership
Year	Ridership	%±
2022	257,765	—
2023	998,245	+287.3%
2024	1,244,417	+24.7%
2025	2,413,581	+94.0%
Source: Metro

== History ==
=== Early transit proposals ===
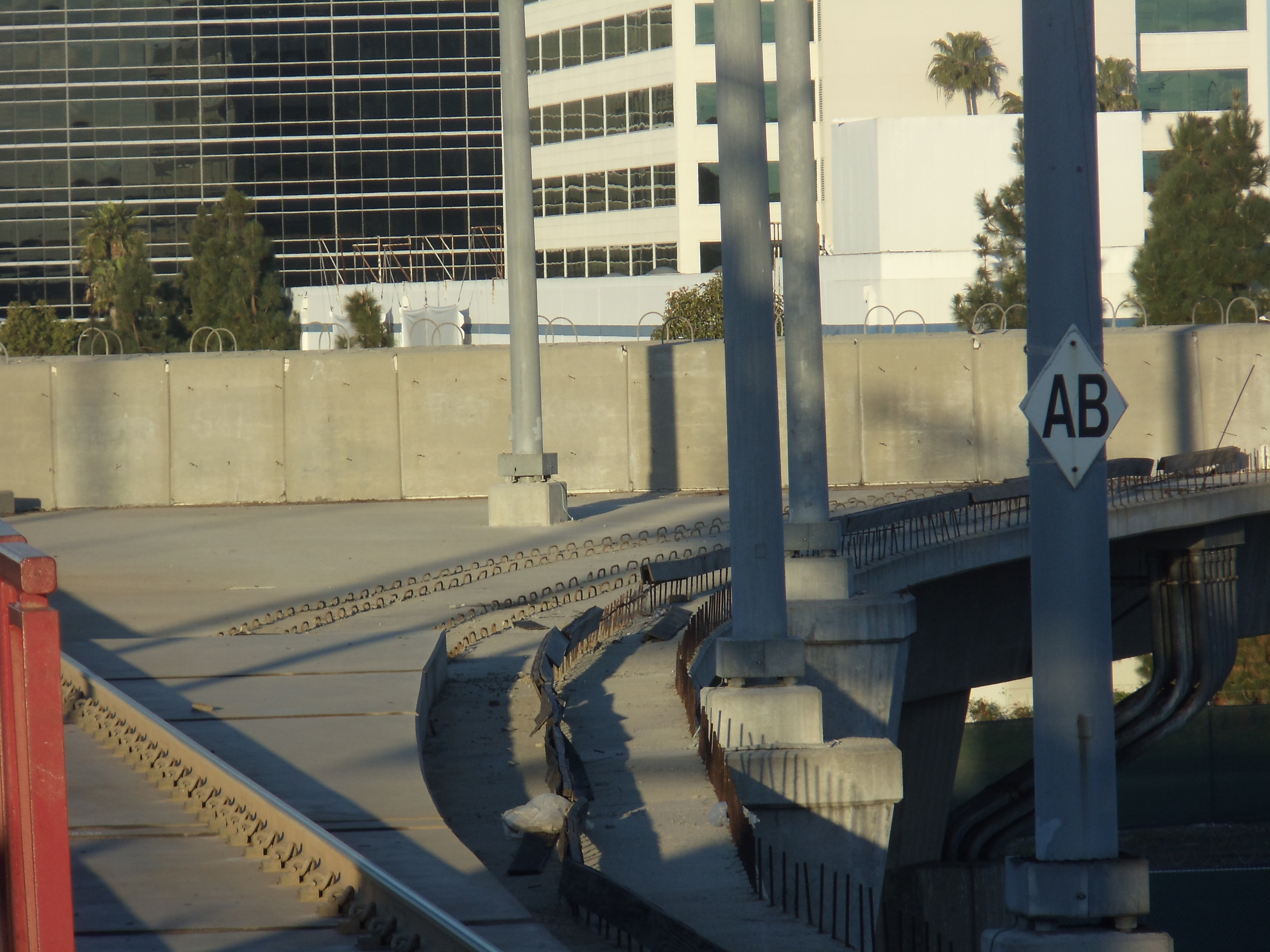
To prepare for a LAX extension, Metro built two concrete ramp stubs west of the Aviation/LAX station.

Extending the C Line (formerly the Green Line) to Los Angeles International Airport was an early goal of Los Angeles transit planners. Studies in 1984 and 1988 outlined routes from the Aviation/LAX station, running northeast to LAX and Westchester, similar to later plans for the second phase of the Sepulveda Transit Corridor. Although planners planned to add a spur towards LAX, they did not include it over fears that commuters would not use the line if they had to go through the airport on the way to work. The proposed extension to LAX was further complicated by concerns from the Federal Aviation Administration that the overhead lines of the rail line would interfere with the landing paths of airplanes. Amid ambivalence at LAX and L.A. City Hall, the plans to extend the line to the airport were shelved. To serve the once bustling aerospace sector in El Segundo, the line went south to Redondo Beach station. Access to the airport required connecting to a shuttle bus at what was then called Aviation/LAX station.

=== Crenshaw/LAX Line project ===
A north–south line along Crenshaw Boulevard was planned following the 1992 Los Angeles riots as a way to better serve transit-dependent residents in the corridor while at the same time providing stimulus for positive economic growth in the South Los Angeles region. The corridor was originally served by Los Angeles Railway Line 5 yellow streetcars until 1955 when the service was replaced with buses. The proposed line would link the E and C lines via Crenshaw and Florence, and a wye would be constructed to connect the K Line tracks to the C Line tracks near the Aviation/LAX station. There would also be a station serving the LAX Airport (Aviation/Century station), completing the LAX connection envisioned by planners in the 1980s. The new line was championed by State Senator Diane Watson and County Supervisor Yvonne Brathwaite Burke, both representing portions of the corridor.

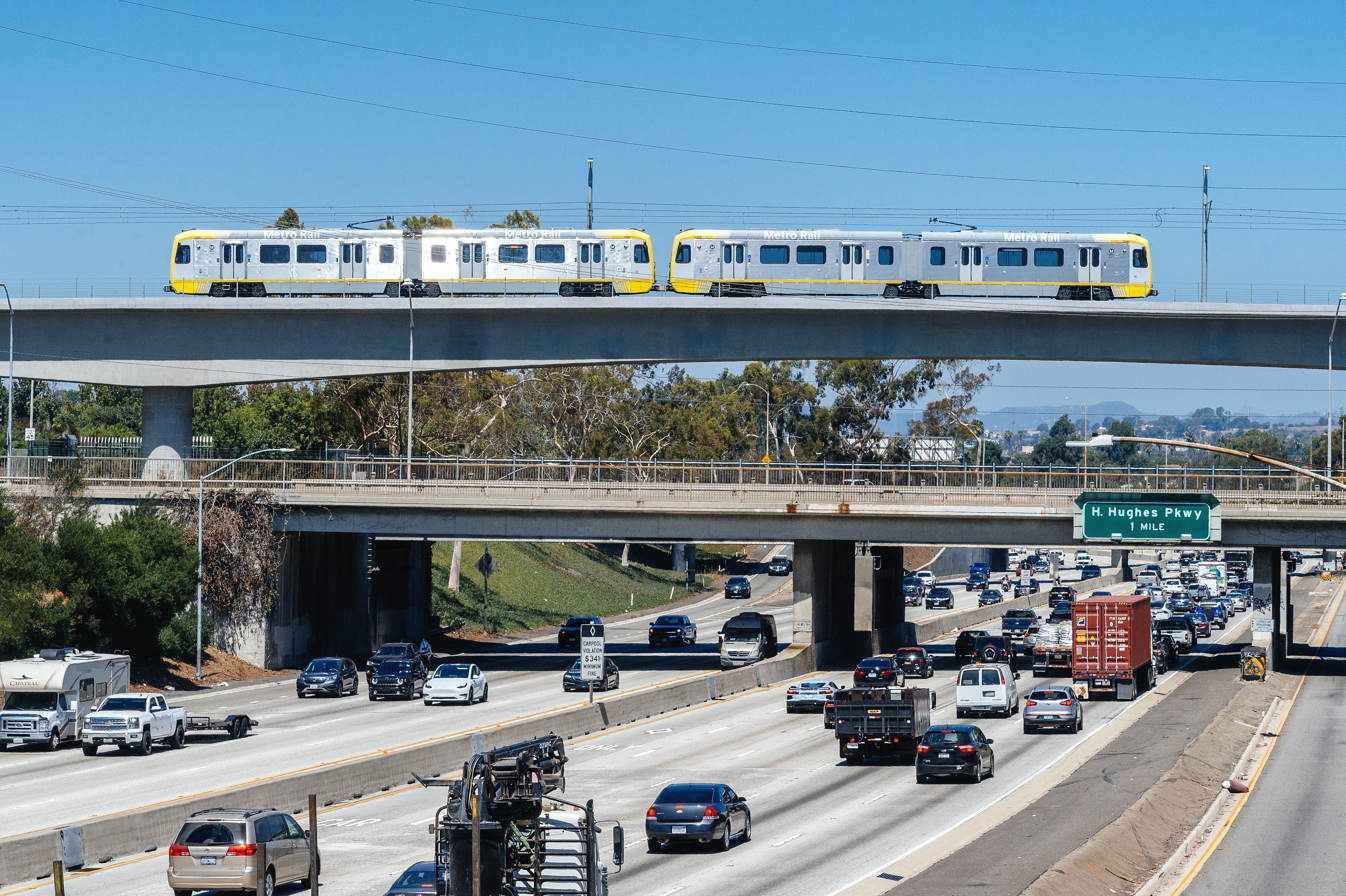
K Line test train crosses Interstate 405 in August 2022

A Major Investment Study was initiated in 1993, and after more than a decade of study, a Final Environmental Impact Report was completed in May 2011. The FTA gave its approval to build the line in 2012, and heavy construction began in June 2014, funded by Measure R. Los Angeles County Supervisor Mark Ridley-Thomas was a key advocate for tunneling and other grade separation along the line. He also convinced Metro in 2013 to add an extra underground station at Leimert Park (Crenshaw/Vernon).

The route was designated as the K Line in November 2019. Originally scheduled to open in 2019, the project saw repeated delays. In April 2020, Metro announced that the completion date for the project would be pushed to no earlier than May 2021 due to construction issues. The support structures for bridges and tunnels had concrete plinths that were incorrectly installed, requiring extensive repairs to sections where tracks had already been installed. The K Line was substantially complete on June 17, 2022.

Even with the line's completion, it won't connect to the C Line or LAX until late 2026. Metro opened a new station at the LAX/Metro Transit Center in 2025, providing Metro riders a seamless transfer to the airport terminals via SkyLink. During construction, Metro only operated the K Line from Expo/Crenshaw station to Westchester/Veterans station with a shuttle service providing passengers access to the LAX shuttle and the C Line at Aviation/LAX station. The northern portion of the line ultimately opened on October 7, 2022.

=== Integration with the C Line ===
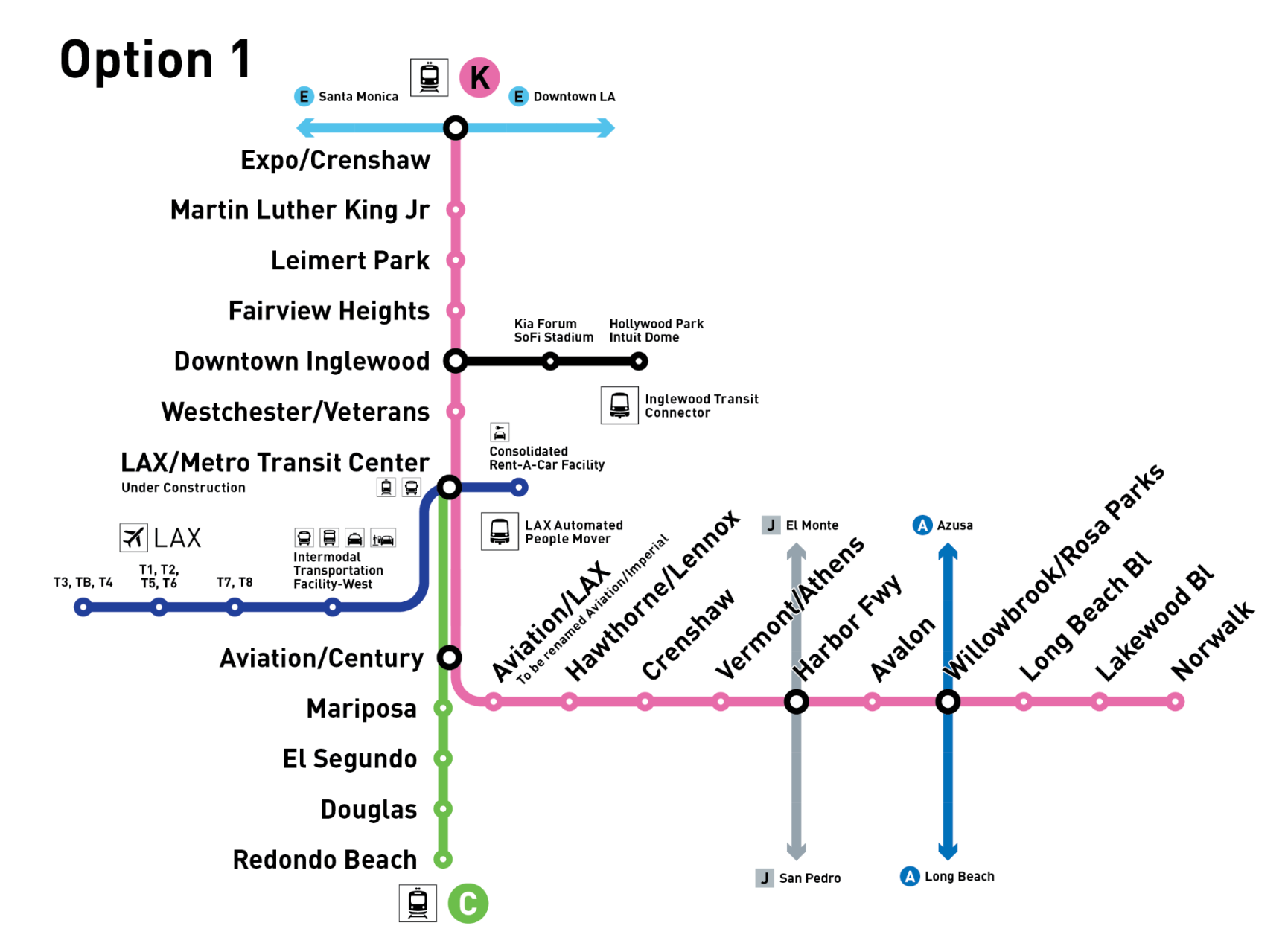
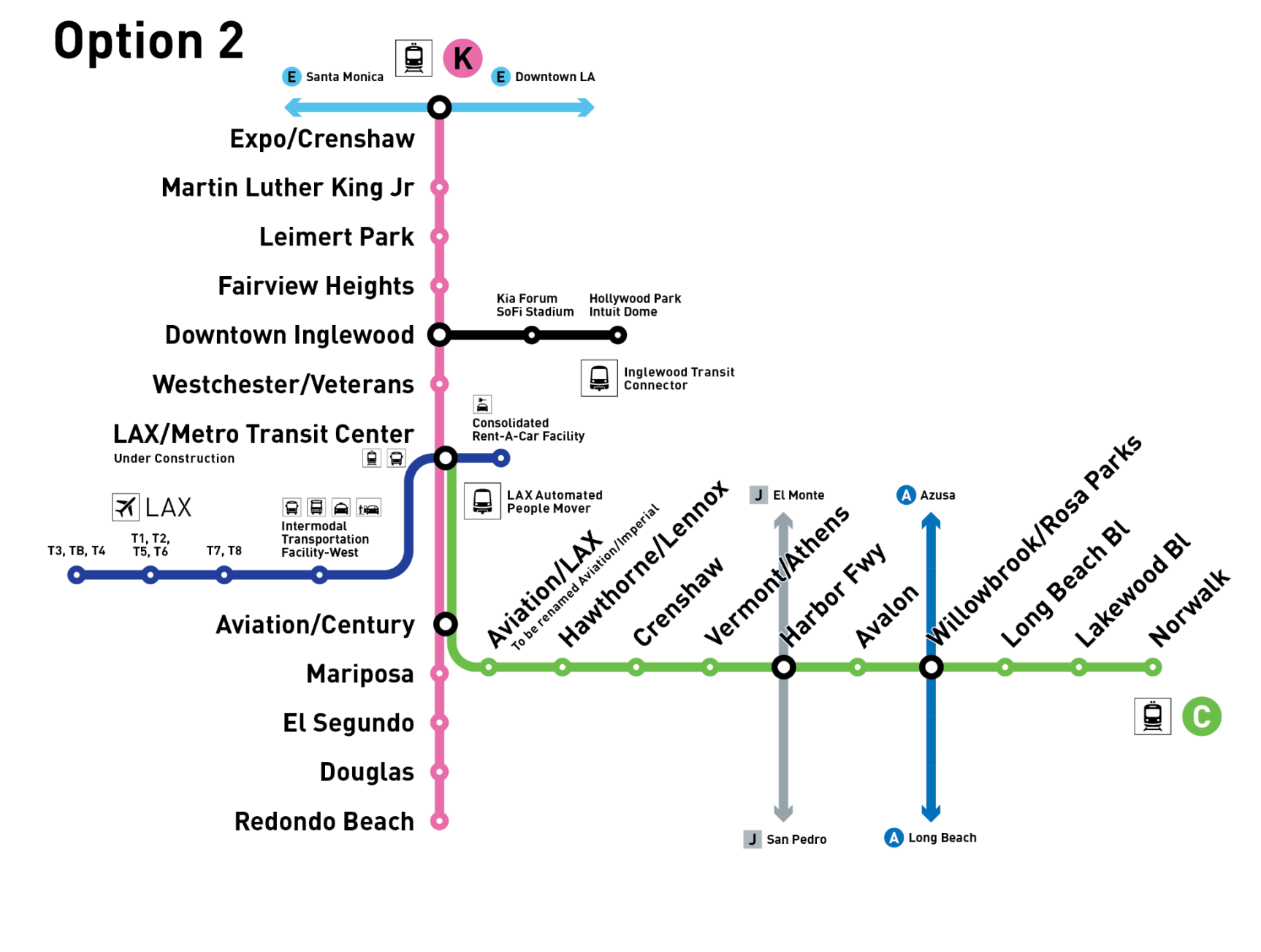
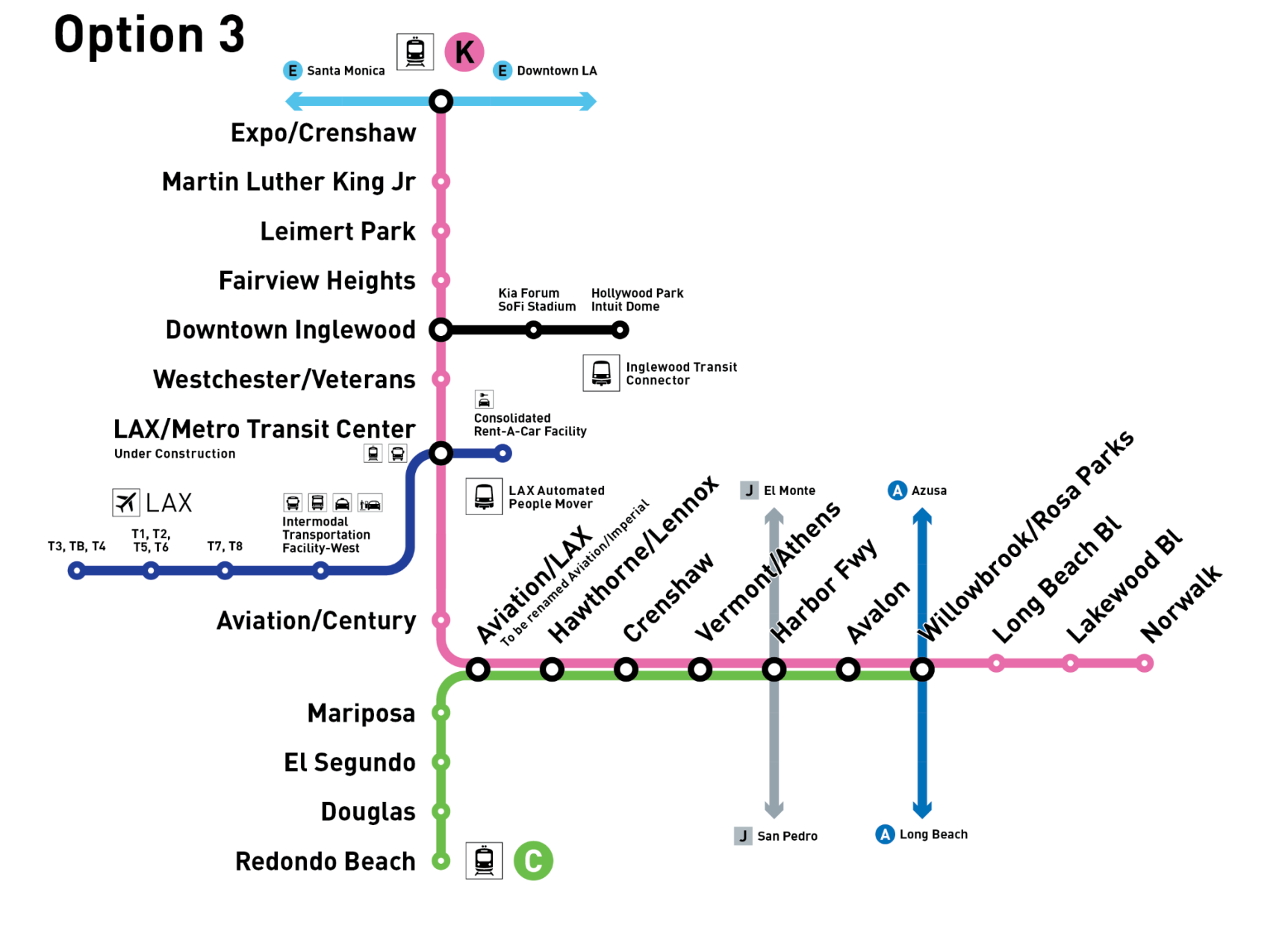
Graphics depicting the three options for future C and K Line service patterns. Option 2 was officially chosen in June 2023.

Varying service patterns have been proposed for integrating the completed K Line into the rest of the system over the course of its planning and construction, all of which have involved sharing trackage and infrastructure facilities with the existing C Line. Although some early proposals would have sent trains through all three directions of the wye, this was rejected by Metro because it would cause too much wear and tear on the track switch mechanisms.

The debate over service patterns proved somewhat contentious. In 2018, with the line then scheduled to open within the year, the Metro board of directors overrode a recommendation by operations staff that would have had a single line operating between Expo/Crenshaw and Norwalk station. Passengers from the Redondo Beach area would have been served by a shuttle to the LAX area, where they would need to transfer to another train to continue east or north. Instead, board members approved a one-year pilot of a configuration that would combine an Expo-to-Norwalk line with another line that would connect Redondo Beach with Willowbrook/Rosa Parks station (later known as Option 3), allowing transfers to the A and J Lines. The approved plan would have incurred higher operating expenses but board members argued it would retain better transfer opportunities for South Bay residents.

Ongoing construction delays led to a reassessment of that plan in 2022. Metro recommended public outreach aimed at reformulating the operating plan before the connection to the C Line opens in 2024; in March 2023, Metro indicated that it would recommend Option 2 in the figure above, in which the K Line would run north–south between Expo/Crenshaw and Redondo Beach, while the C Line would run west-east between LAX and Norwalk. On June 22, 2023, Metro's board of directors officially approved the implementation of Option 2 based on staff recommendation and public opinion.

=== LAX/Metro Transit Center ===
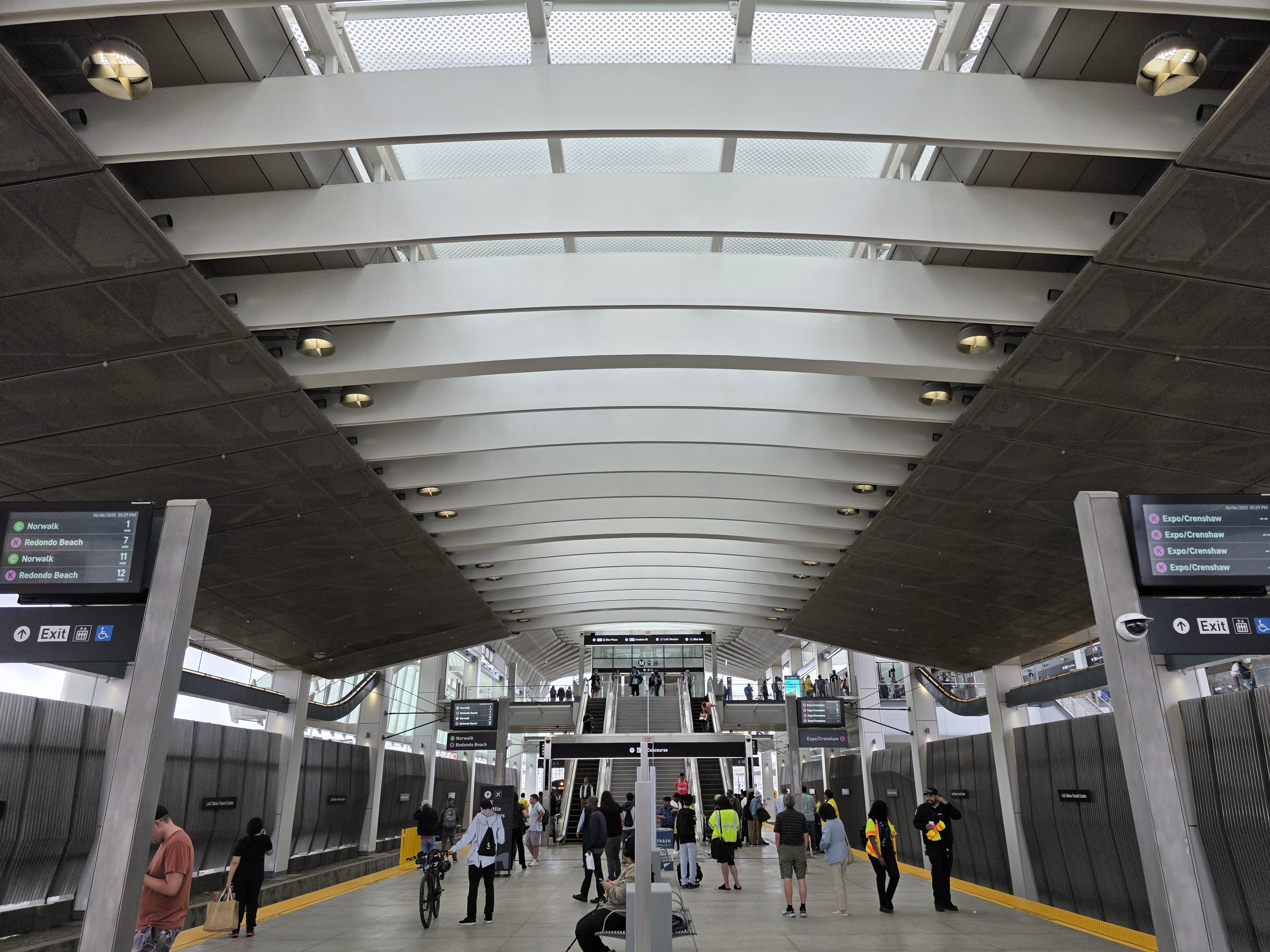
The LAX/Metro Transit Center platform on opening day

The line was from its inception intended to offer a connection to LAX via an Automated People Mover (APM). However, at the time the line was designed, it was unclear where exactly that connection would take place. While Metro expected that the connection would be at Aviation/Century station, ultimately the route chosen for SkyLink intersected with the new line at 96th Street, about half a mile to the north, requiring the design of an additional station while the overall line was still under construction.

In 2014, Metro approved the planning and scoping of this station, which was called Aviation/96th station and the Airport Metro Connector in planning documents but was ultimately designated the LAX/Metro Transit Center. This station was intended to serve as Metro Rail's main gateway to the airport itself, while the Aviation/Century station will serve destinations along the busy Century Boulevard corridor.

While initial plans called for the full length of the project to be opened for service while the LAX/Metro Transit Center was under development, delays in the opening of the main line meant that major construction on the station was already underway by the time the line was ready. As a result, the line opened on October 7, 2022 only from Expo/Crenshaw station to Westchester/Veterans station.

The C Line and K lines began operating along their final service patterns on November 3, 2024, with Aviation/Century station opening. However, the segment of both lines between Westchester/Veterans station and Aviation/Century station, including the LAX/Metro Transit Center, would not provide passenger service for a period of pre-revenue testing before the LAX/Metro Transit Center opened. The LAX/Metro Transit Center opened on June 6, 2025.

=== Platform extensions ===
While the stations on the K Line were built to accommodate three-car trains, the former C Line stations built south of Interstate 105 were only built to accommodate two-car trains. To enable increased capacity of the line, Metro plans to lengthen the platforms at Aviation/Imperial station, Mariposa station, Douglas station, and Redondo Beach station. The project would also add traction power substations and replace catenary wire and track ties. In April 2023, the state awarded Metro $95 million for the project, which is expected to cost $141 million. The project is expected to be complete in time for the 2028 Summer Olympics.

== Future developments ==
=== Southern extension to South Bay ===
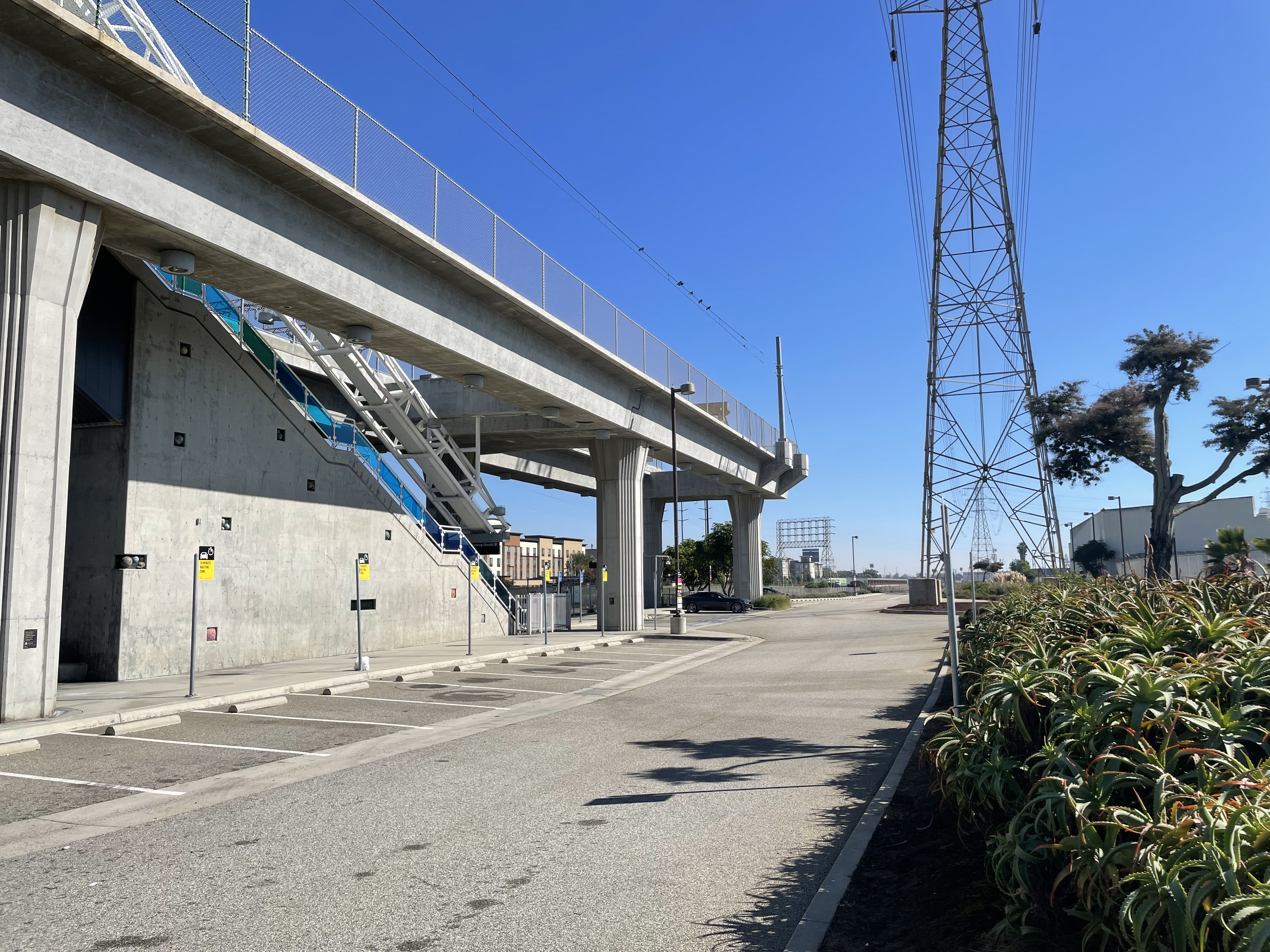
The future South Bay K Line Extension will extend the Metro K Line from these stub tracks at the southern end of the Redondo Beach station to Torrance.

Los Angeles Metro is currently working on the initial environmental study of a corridor extension of the K Line from its Redondo Beach terminus toward the southeast. The K Line Extension to Torrance would roughly follow the Harbor Subdivision ROW into the South Bay, to the Torrance Regional Transit Center (RTC). Metro and the public are considering two alternatives in the DEIR: an elevated light-rail extension along Hawthorne Boulevard, and an at-grade extension along a BNSF line beside Condon Avenue. The study of the South Bay Extension will lead to the publication of a Draft Environmental Impact Report (DEIR). The study was expected to be completed in 2011. The project was placed on hold in the spring of 2012 due to uncertain funding. With the passage of Measure M in 2016, $619 million was cited for the Green Line Extension south, and the study resumed. The DEIR was released in January 2023. The study area includes the former Harbor Subdivision right of way. The extension study includes the Redondo Beach station to the Torrance Transit Center, a 4.5-mile (7.2 km) extension study area.

In January 2026, Metro's Planning and Programming Committee was scheduled to consider certifying the FEIR for the project at its January 14, 2026 meeting. However, the committee voted to postpone the certification decision to the board of directors' meeting on January 22, 2026, following political opposition from local residents, with the board ultimately unanimously approving Alternative 3 as the LPA instead of the Hybrid Alternative.

The project became an extension of the K Line upon the completion of Aviation/Century station, along with its associated service changes, on November 3, 2024, though Metro has yet to change the project's official name.

=== Northern extension to Hollywood ===
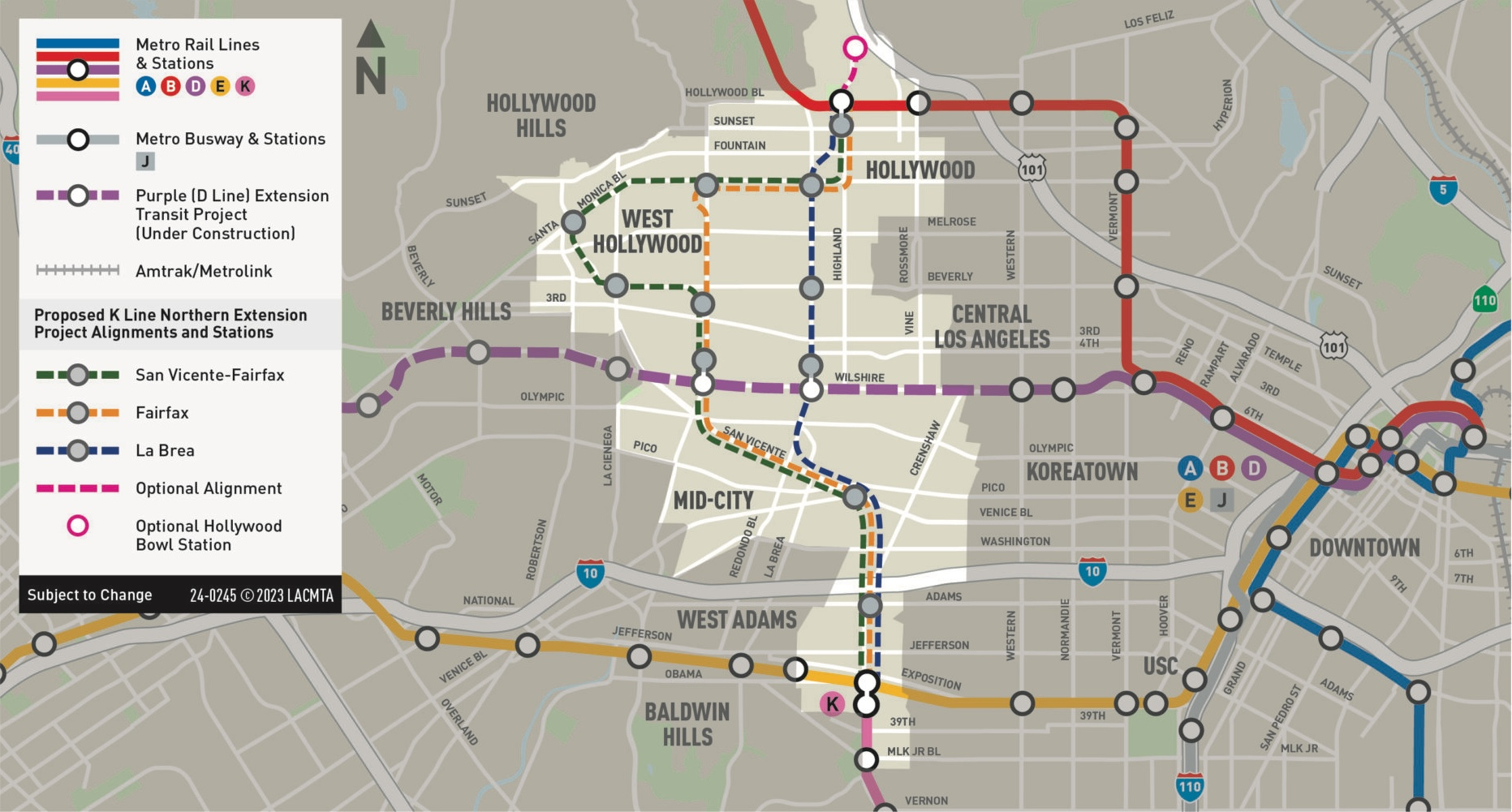
Map of the study area of the K Line Northern Extension Project

The original plans for the Crenshaw/LAX Line project connected Wilshire Boulevard to Los Angeles International Airport. However, once light rail was selected as the preferred mode, the cost for the entire route exceeded the project budget, so part of the corridor north of Exposition Boulevard was deferred until funds became available.

The final design for the Crenshaw/LAX project included a tunneled station at Expo/Crenshaw to accommodate a potential northward extension, which increased the cost of the original project by $236 million.

With the passage of Measure M and the enthusiastic support of the city of West Hollywood, the K Line Northern Extension, which would travel north from the current Expo/Crenshaw terminus, connecting along the way to the B and D lines, is currently under development. Three alternative alignments were studied, all ending at the B Line's Hollywood/Highland station, with an optional station at the Hollywood Bowl also being considered. Alternative 1, the San Vicente Hybrid Alternative, followed Crenshaw Boulevard and San Vicente Boulevard, turning north on Fairfax Avenue to serve The Original Farmers Market and Television City before turning on Beverly Boulevard to connect back to San Vicente Boulevard near Cedars-Sinai Medical Center towards West Hollywood at Pacific Design Center. Finally, serving new stations on Santa Monica Boulevard, the route curves north again towards Hollywood. The other two alternatives followed a traditional north–south routing on either Fairfax Avenue or La Brea Avenue.

On March 26, 2026, the Metro board of directors approved Alternative 1 as the locally preferred alternative (LPA) at a board meeting. The alignment approved by the board includes a Hollywood Bowl station and a slightly modified tunnel alignment around Lafayette Square in response to community concerns. The extension will be constructed in phases – the segment between Expo/Crenshaw and Wilshire/Fairfax as an initial operating segment (IOS) and the segment north of Wilshire/Fairfax will at a future date. The approval is contingent upon the formation of an Enhanced Infrastructure Financing District (EIFD) by West Hollywood in coordination with Los Angeles County to accelerate construction on the project.

Phase	Date opening	Station	City/Neighborhood	Connecting services
Phase 2	TBA	Hollywood Bowl station	Hollywood (Los Angeles)	
Phase 2	TBA	Hollywood/Highland station	Hollywood (Los Angeles)	B Line
Phase 2	TBA	La Brea/Santa Monica station	West Hollywood	
Phase 2	TBA	Fairfax/Santa Monica station	West Hollywood	
Phase 2	TBA	San Vicente/Santa Monica station	West Hollywood	
Phase 2	TBA	La Cienega/Beverly station	Beverly Grove (Los Angeles)	
Phase 2	TBA	Fairfax/3rd Street station	Fairfax District (Los Angeles)	
Initial Operating Segment (IOS)	2047	Wilshire/Fairfax station	Miracle Mile (Los Angeles)	D Line
Initial Operating Segment (IOS)	2047	Midtown Crossing station	Mid-Wilshire (Los Angeles)	
Initial Operating Segment (IOS)	2047	Crenshaw/Adams station	West Adams (Los Angeles)	
Already built	October 7, 2022	Expo/Crenshaw station	Jefferson Park (Los Angeles)	E Line

== Operations ==
On Metro Rail's internal timetables, the K Line is called line 807.

=== Maintenance ===
The K Line is operated out of Division 22 (Hawthorne Yard & Shop) and Division 16 (Southwestern Yard). These yards store the fleet used on the K Line. Light maintenance is performed on the fleet in Division 22, while heavier maintenance is conducted in Division 16. Division 22 is located between Redondo Beach and Douglas stations. Trains enter the yard via a junction halfway between the two stations. Northbound trains may enter, but there is no exit track to continue north. Southbound trains may enter and exit the yard to continue south. Division 16 is located in Westchester, directly east of the northern runways of Los Angeles International Airport (LAX), and adjacent to the LAX/Metro Transit Center. Trains access the yard via crossovers from the north and south sides of the yard.

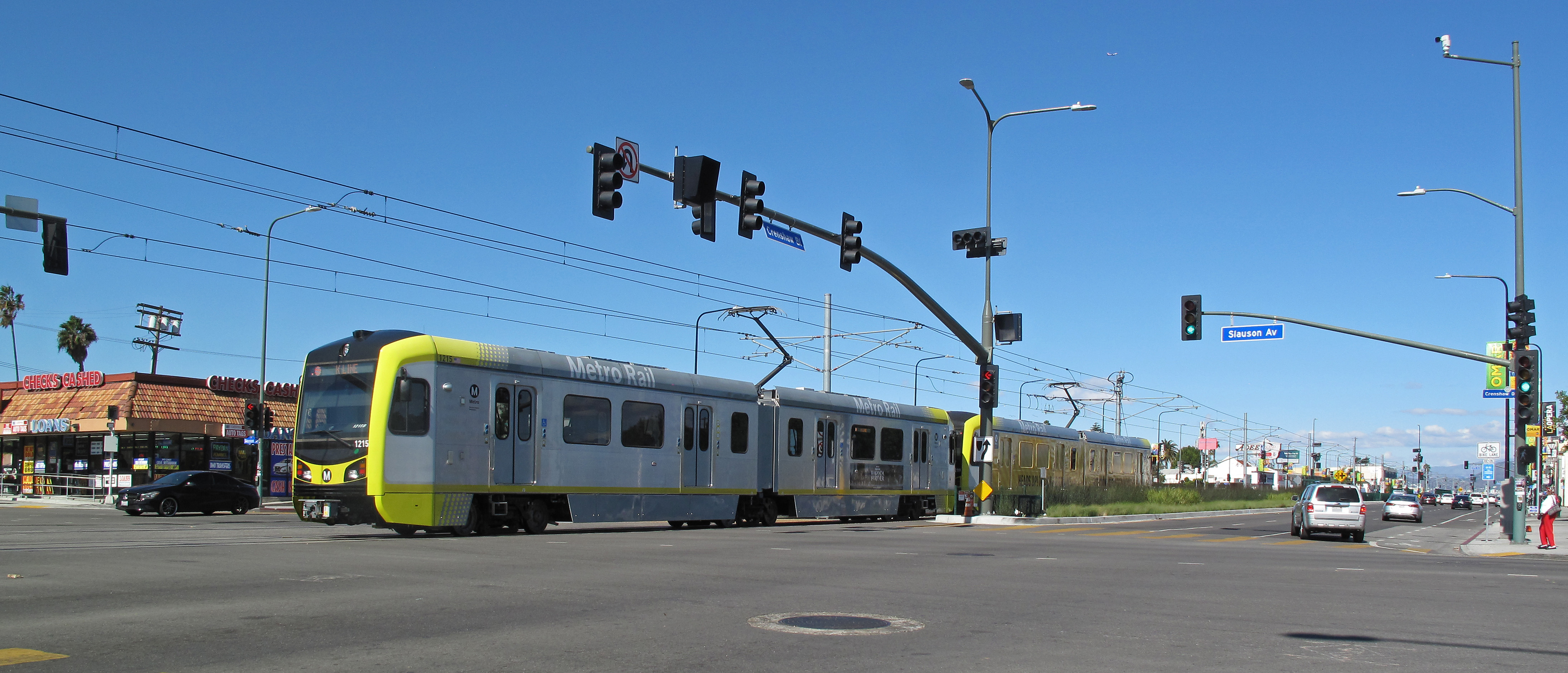
A northbound K Line train in Hyde Park

=== Rolling stock ===
As of 2024, the Kinki Sharyo P3010 is the only rolling stock to serve the K Line. Trains run in one- or two-car consists. Metro is planning to extend the platforms south of Aviation/Century station to be able to eventually accommodate up to three-car trains.

== Incident ==
- On February 18, 2023, a northbound train collided with a cement mixer at the Cedar Avenue crossing between the Downtown Inglewood and Westchester/Veterans stations.

== See also ==
- Foothill Extension
- D Line Extension
- Southeast Gateway Line
- East San Fernando Valley Light Rail Transit Project
