= Westchester/Veterans station =

Light rail station in Inglewood, California

Westchester/Veterans
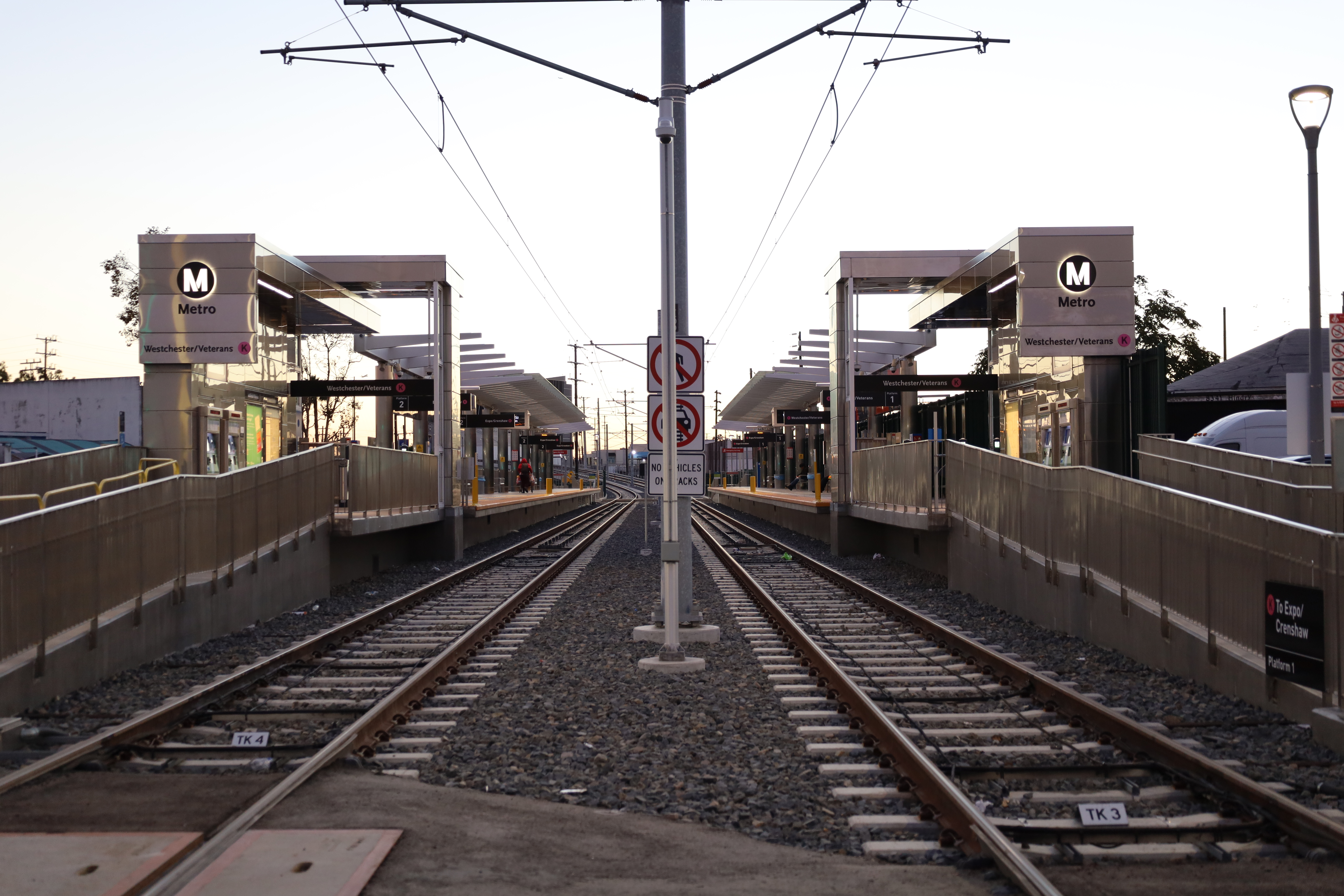
- Westchester/Veterans station in 2022

General information
- Location: 1040 West Florence Avenue; Inglewood, California
- Coordinates: 33.962045°N 118.374354°W
- Owner: Los Angeles County Metropolitan Transportation Authority
- Platforms: 2 side platforms
- Tracks: 2
- Connections: Los Angeles Metro Bus; Metro Micro

Construction
- Structure type: At-grade
- Accessible: Yes

History
- Opened: October 7, 2022
- Former names: Florence/Hindry

Passengers
- FY 2025: 503 (avg. wkdy boardings)

Services
| Preceding station | Metro Rail | Following station |
|---|---|---|
| Downtown Inglewood toward Expo/Crenshaw | K Line | LAX/Metro Transit Center toward Redondo Beach |
Location

Westchester/Veterans station is an at-grade light rail station on the K Line of the Los Angeles Metro Rail system. It is located alongside Florence Avenue near its intersection of Hindry Avenue, located in the Westchester neighborhood of Los Angeles, but across the street from the city of Inglewood. The station served as the temporary southern terminus of the K Line until through-routing with the C Line commenced on June 6, 2025, upon the opening of the LAX/Metro Transit Center.

During planning, the station was known as "Florence/Hindry", with local feedback for a final name being varied. However, Metro would instead adopt the name "Westchester" in July 2015 in response to staff recommendation. However, Metro would later add "/Veterans" to the name in response to a joint amending motion introduced by then-Los Angeles County Supervisor Mark Ridley-Thomas and Inglewood mayor James T. Butts Jr. to reference the U.S.VETS Inglewood campus, located roughly a 1/2 mile (0.80 km) to the south.

The station opened on October 7, 2022. Metro held a ceremonial ribbon cutting for the station on September 17, 2022.

The station incorporates artwork by the artist Geoff McFetridge. Hindry station was funded and fully incorporated into the project in May 2013 after significant community support.

== Service ==
=== Hours and frequency ===
K Line service hours are approximately from 4:30 a.m. until 12:00 a.m. daily. Trains operate every 10 minutes throughout most of the day. Trains run every 20 minutes after 8:00 p.m. every day and before 8:00 a.m. on weekends.

=== Connections ===
As of June 6, 2025, the following connections are available:

- Los Angeles Metro Bus: 115
- Metro Micro: LAX/Inglewood Zone
