= Jefferson Park, Los Angeles =

Jefferson Park
- Neighborhood of Los Angeles
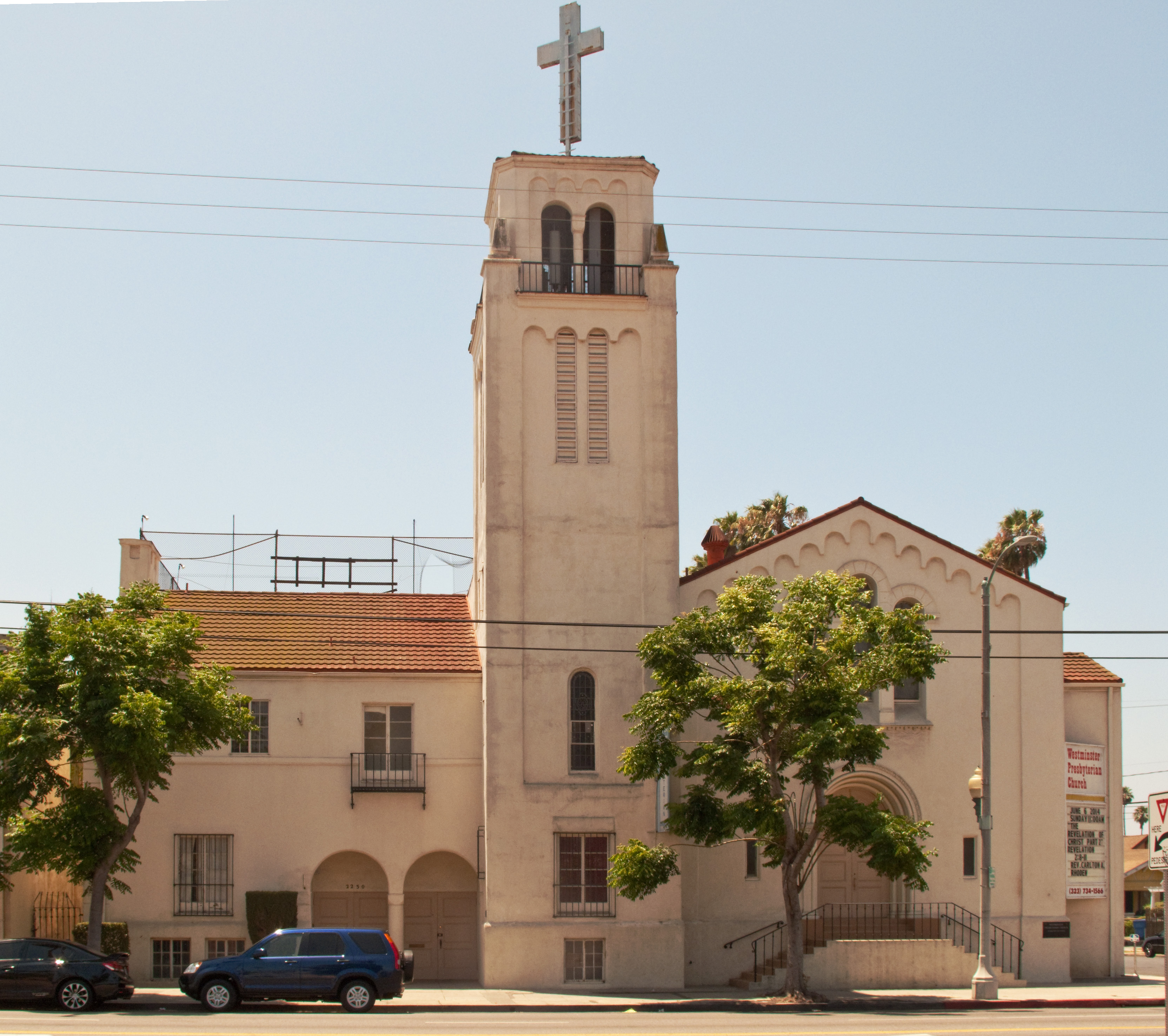
- The historic Mission Revival style Westminster Presbyterian Church

- Location within Central Los Angeles
- Coordinates: 34.02722°N 118.31667°W
- Country: United States
- State: California
- County: Los Angeles
- City: Los Angeles
- Time zone: UTC-8 (PST)
  - Summer (DST): UTC-7 (PDT)
- Zip Code: 90018
- Area code: 323

Jefferson Park is a neighborhood in the South Los Angeles region of the City of Los Angeles, California. Located within the West Adams district, there are fourteen Los Angeles Historic-Cultural Monuments in the neighborhood, and in 1987, the 1923 Spanish Colonial Revival Jefferson Branch Library was added to the National Register of Historic Places. A portion of the neighborhood is a designated Historic Preservation Overlay Zone (HPOZ).

== History ==
In the early 1800s, the area that would become Jefferson Park was partly within the Rancho Las Cienegas and partly within the common lands surrounding the pueblo. The area remained farmland into the 1900s. (One of the original farmhouses, the Starr Dairy Farmhouse, still remains in the community.)

By 1903, there were trolley cars running down Jefferson and Adams Boulevard. With easy access to downtown, Jefferson Park became a desirable place to build a home. Developed from 1905 to 1920, Jefferson Park grew to approximately 2500 homes spread over 50 square blocks. Centered along Jefferson Boulevard, the neighborhood is home to Craftsman bungalows, brick warehouses, colorful wall murals and small storefronts.

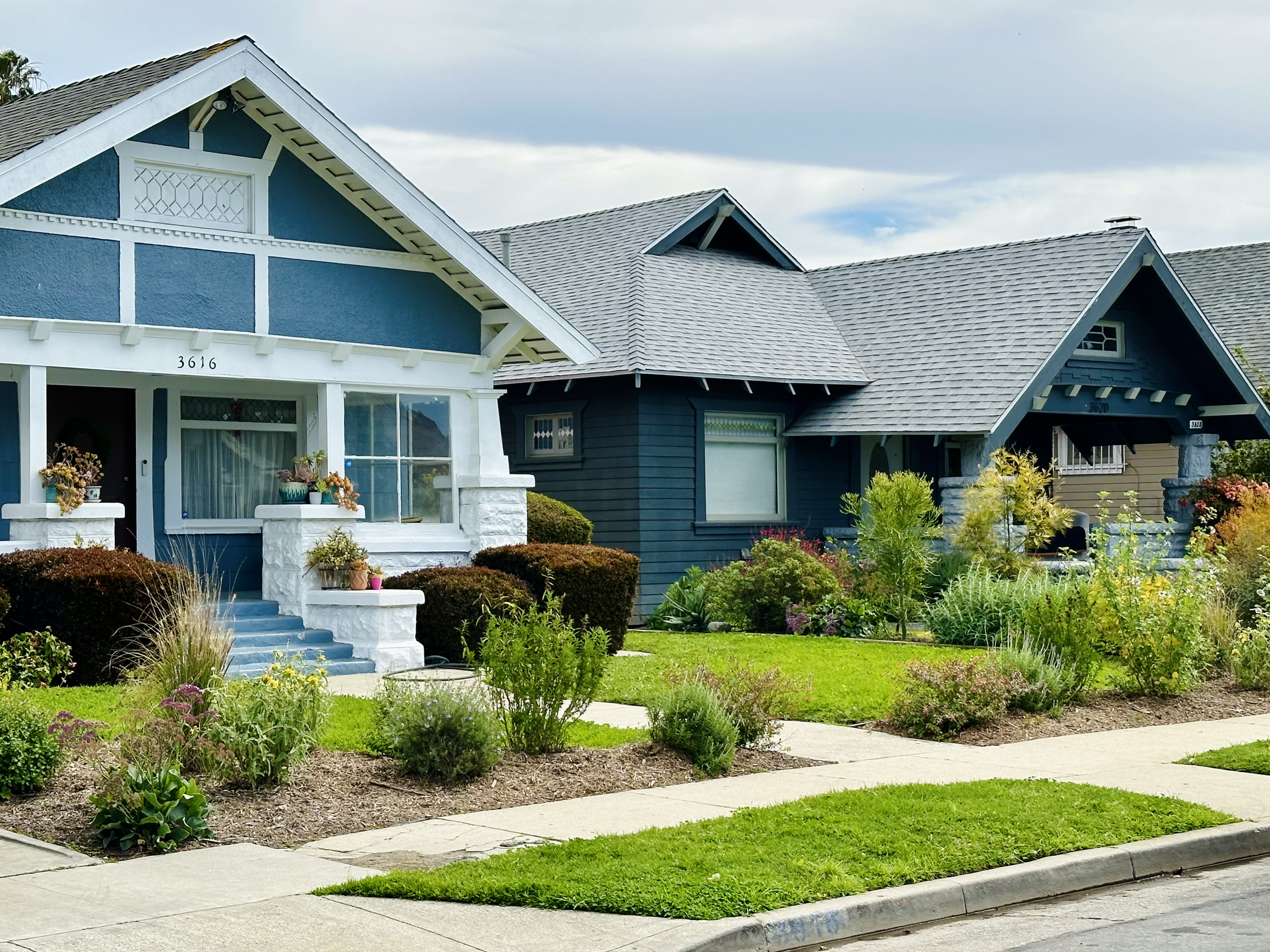
Craftsman bungalows on 3rd Avenue at 36th Street in the Jefferson Park HPOZ, 2024

After the 1948 Supreme Court ruling that banned racial covenants on property - Shelley v. Kraemer - many of Jefferson Park's white residents left the neighborhood, in turn being replaced by upper-middle and upper-class African-Americans.

Jefferson Park also saw an influx of Creoles of color in the post-World War II period. The resulting area was dubbed "Little New Orleans" and contained a number of Creole-owned businesses such as Harold & Belle's, an upscale Creole restaurant and Big Loaf Bakery.

In September 1998, the Jefferson Park Gateway Monument was unveiled at the corner of Crenshaw Boulevard and Jefferson Boulevard. According to then-councilman Nate Holden, the project was a sign of the ongoing revitalization of the area. The Gateway Monument was removed between June 2011 and May 2012 when the corner lot was redeveloped.

In 2005, the Star Dairy Farmhouse was condemned by the city as a nuisance. Built in 1887, it had fallen into disrepair. After years of restoration, in 2014 it received a preservation award from the Los Angeles Conservancy. The Conservancy stated: "The farmhouse is now the oldest remaining house in the West Adams neighborhood of Jefferson Park, and the last link to the area’s agricultural history."

In 2014, the Los Angeles Times reported that "once-struggling neighborhoods" like Jefferson Park were now experiencing soaring home prices as young professionals were purchasing the American Craftsman homes in the community and new shops and restaurants were opening up.

== Geography ==
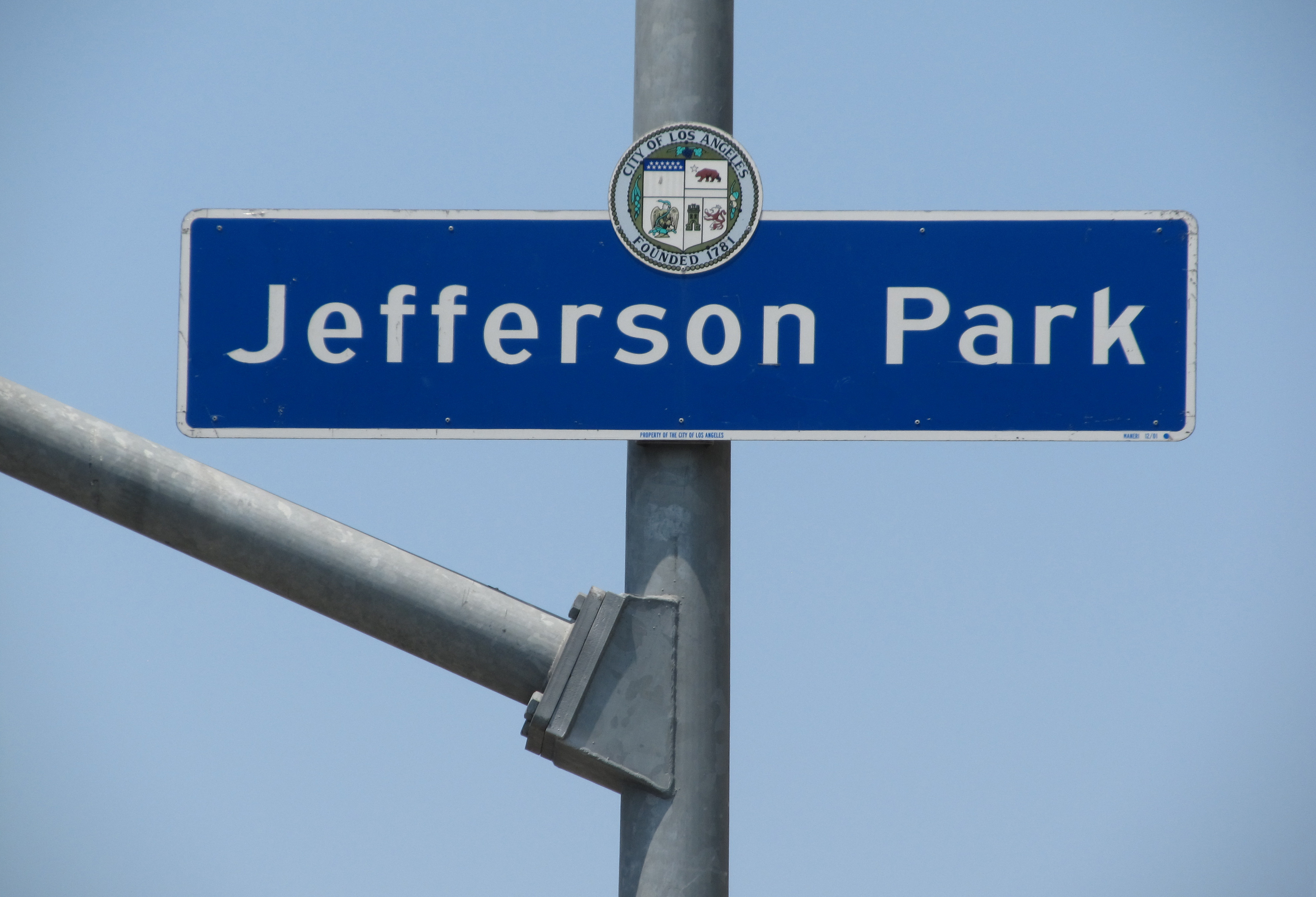
Neighborhood sign at 4th Avenue and Jefferson Boulevard

According to the city of Los Angeles and the Los Angeles Times, Jefferson Park is bounded by Adams Boulevard on the north, Exposition Boulevard on the south, Crenshaw Boulevard on the west and Western Avenue on the east. Jefferson Park is bounded by West Adams, West Adams Terrace, Adams-Normandie, Crenshaw, University Park, Leimert Park, and Exposition Park neighborhoods, as well as the greater USC campus.

It was designated an official city neighborhood in 1988, with then-mayor Tom Bradley attending the event. Neighborhood signs are installed along Jefferson Boulevard and Exposition Boulevard.

== Historic Preservation Overlay Zone ==
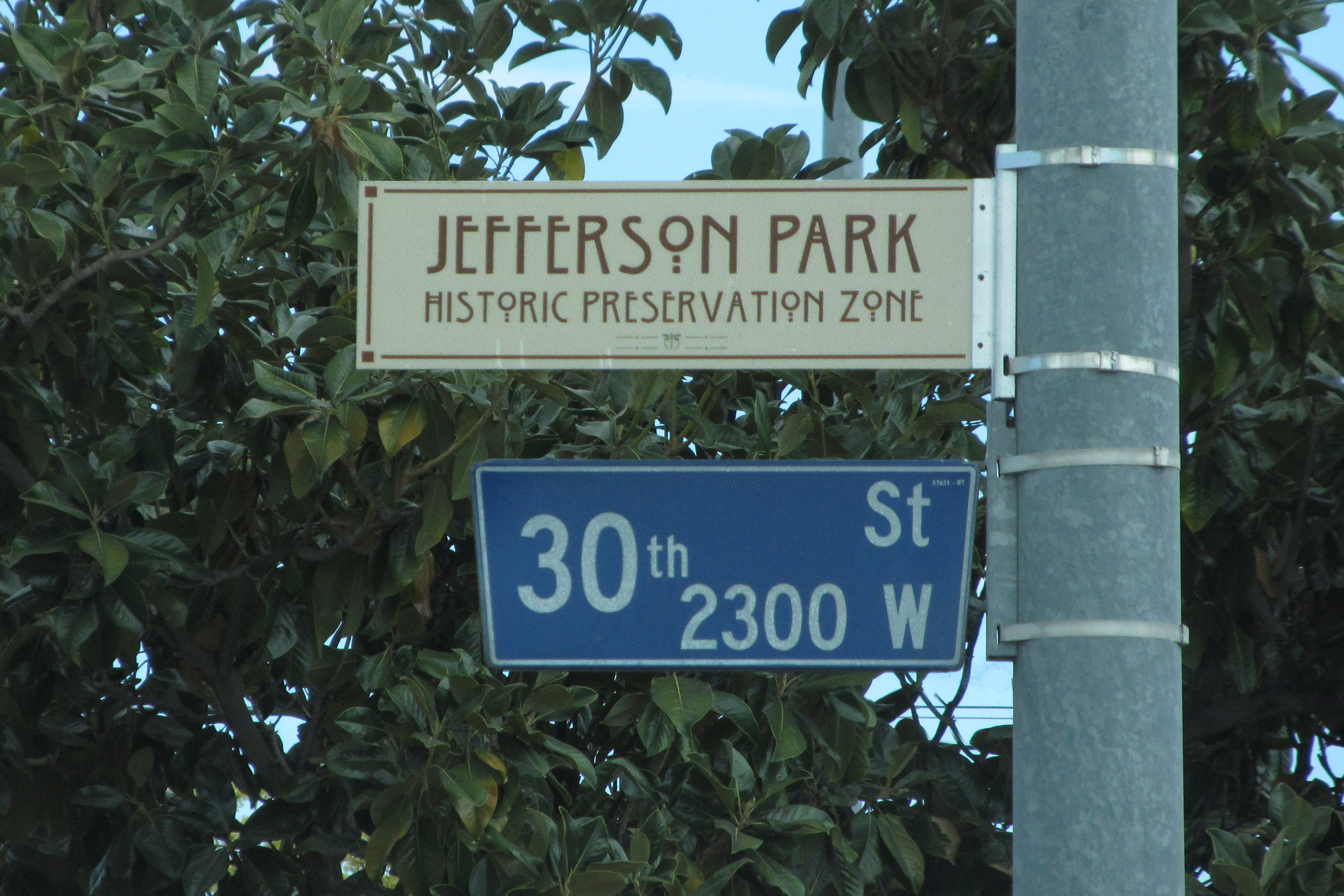
Historic Preservation Zone sign on 30th Street

The Jefferson Park Historic Preservation Overlay Zone (HPOZ) was adopted by the Los Angeles City Council in 2011. The preservation plan offers guidelines for both commercial and residential structures in the community. The HPOZ does not cover the entire Jefferson Park neighborhood.

The HPOZ is bounded by Adams Boulevard on the north, 7th Avenue on the west, Exposition Boulevard on the south (from Crenshaw Boulevard to Arlington Avenue), and Jefferson Boulevard on the south (from Arlington Avenue to Western Avenue). Street signs in the area have an additional sign to indicate that the street is part of the HPOZ area.

== Population ==
=== 2000 ===
A total of 23,130 people lived in the neighborhood's 1.42 square miles, according to the 2000 U.S. census—averaging 16,300 people per square mile, among the highest population density in the city as a whole. The median age was 31, about the same as the rest of the city.

Within the neighborhood, African Americans made up 46.8% of the population, with Latinos 44.9%, Asian 2.9%, non-Hispanic Whites 2.7% and others 2.7%. Mexico and El Salvador were the most common places of birth for the 32.7% of the residents who were born abroad, considered an average percentage of foreign-born when compared with the city or county as a whole.

In 2000, there were 1,365 families headed by single parents, or 26.6%, a rate that was high for the county and the city.

=== 2008 ===
The median household income in 2008 dollars was $32,654. The average household size of 2.8 people was about the same as the rest of the city. Renters occupied 69.5% of the housing units, and homeowners occupied the rest.

Jefferson Park residents aged 25 and older holding a four-year degree amounted to 11.8% of the population in 2000, considered low when compared with the city and the county as a whole; the percentage of residents aged 25 and older with a high school diploma was also considered low.

=== 2022 ===
According to USC's 'Neighborhood Data for Social Change', the median household income in 2022 was $58,440. Residential structures occupy 90.26% of the neighborhood, while commercial structures only occupy 4.04% of the area. 30.39% of the population are home-owners, while 69.61% are renters. 2.02% are veterans.

== Historic-Cultural Monuments ==
- Westminster Presbyterian Church, 2230 W. Jefferson Blvd. Designated Historic-Cultural Monument 229 on June 11, 1980
- Walker Mansion, 3300 W Adams Boulevard. Designated Historic-Cultural Monument 419 on March 3, 1989
- Wells-Halliday Mansion, 2146 W. Adams Blvd. Designated Historic-Cultural Monument 458 on November 3, 1989
- Guasti Villa/Busby Berkeley Estate, 3500 W Adams Boulevard. Designated Historic-Cultural Monument 478 on January 30, 1990
- Dr. Grandville MacGowan Home, 3726 W. Adams Blvd. Designated Historic-Cultural Monument 479 on January 30, 1990
- Lycurgus Lindsay Mansion, 3424 W. Adams Blvd. Designated Historic-Cultural Monument 496 on May 30, 1990
- Korean Independence Memorial Building, 1368 W. Jefferson Blvd. Designated Historic-Cultural Monument 548 on October 2, 1991
- Denker Estate, 3820 W. Adams Blvd. Designated Historic-Cultural Monument 591 on March 8, 1994
- Betty Hill House, 1655 W. 37th Pl. Designated Historic-Cultural Monument 791 on April 13, 2005
- Joseph L. Starr Farmhouse, 2801 S. Arlington Ave. Designated Historic-Cultural Monument 865 on April 11, 2007. Built in 1887, it received a Los Angeles Conservancy Preservation Award in 2014.
- Glen Lukens Home and Studio. Designed by pioneering mid-century Modernist Raphael Soriano for ceramicist Glen Lukens. Designated Historic-Cultural Monument 866 on April 11, 2007
- Hauerwaas Kusayanagi Residence, 3741 W 27th Street Designated Historic-Cultural Monument 990 on October 27, 2010
- Paul Revere Williams home, 1271 W 35th Street. Designated Historic-Cultural Monument 1253 on February 16, 2022.

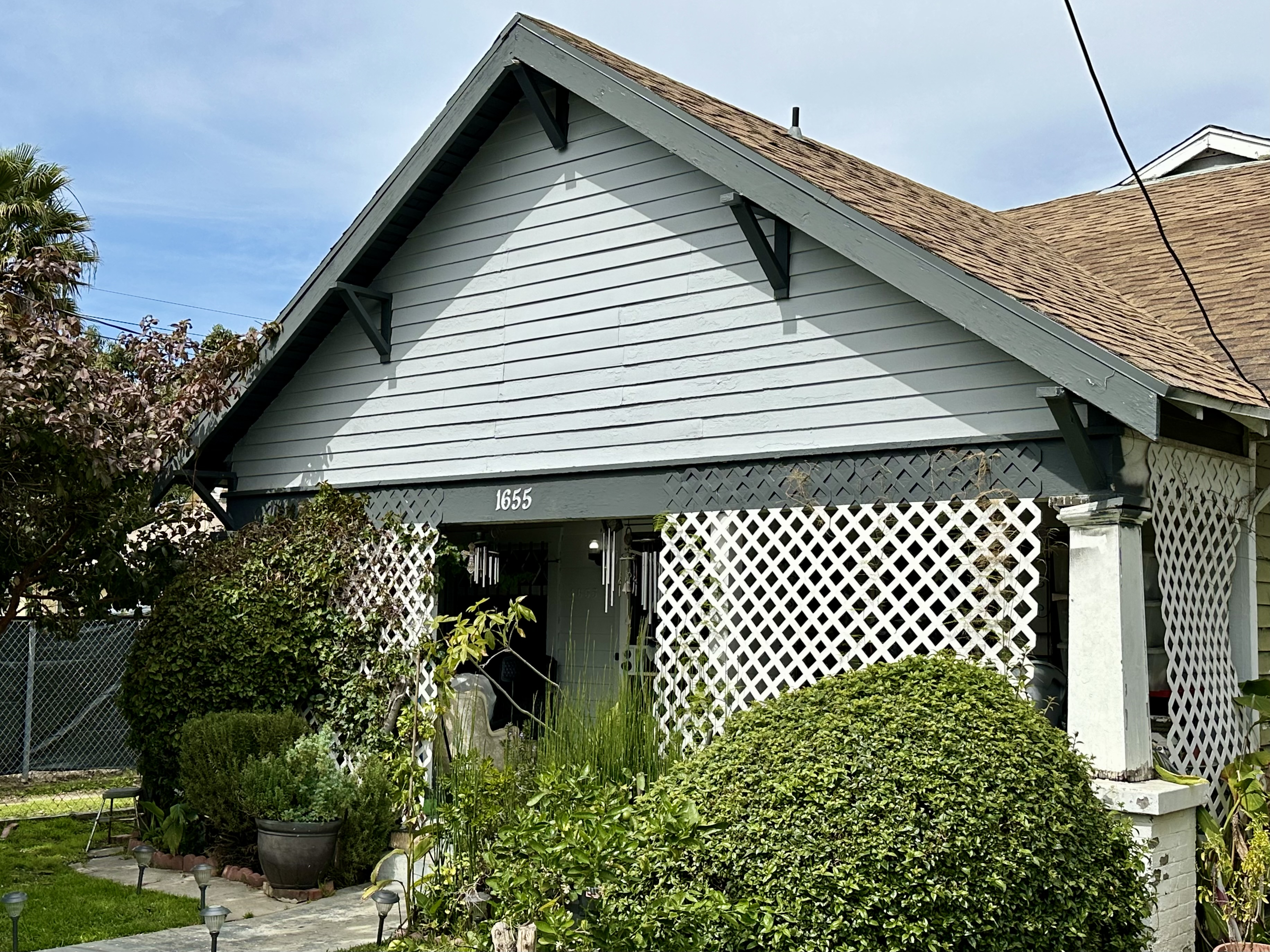
Betty Hill House, 2024

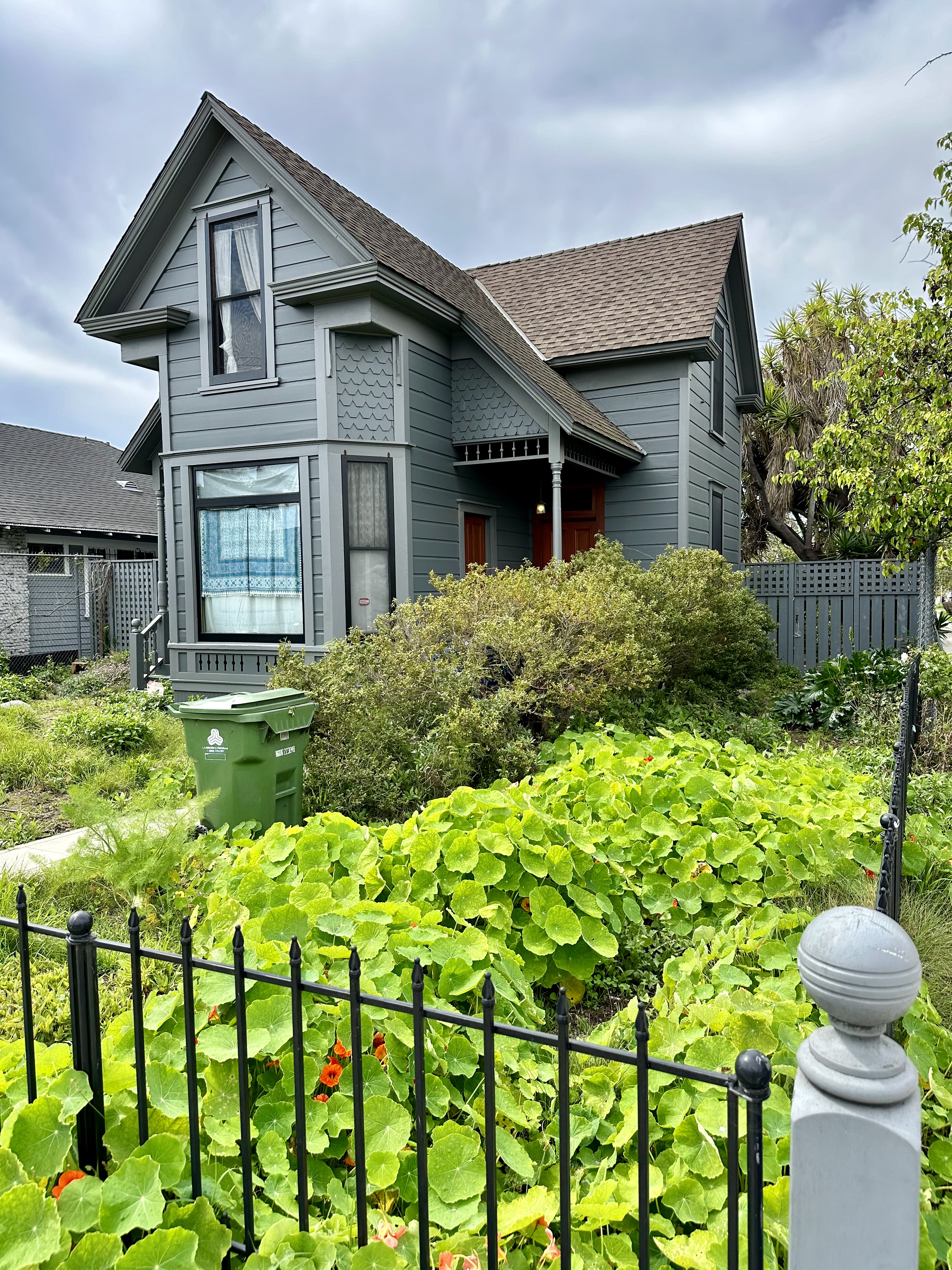
Joseph L. Starr Farmhouse, 2024

== Landmarks and attractions ==
- Trinity Baptist Church, 2040 W. Jefferson Boulevard. Originally located at 36th and Normandie, it moved to its present location in 1948. The master plan for the church was designed by noted African-American architect Paul Williams.
- Westminster Presbyterian Church, 2230 West Jefferson Boulevard. Established in 1904, is one of the oldest African-American Presbyterian churches in California.

== Parks and Libraries ==
- Leslie N. Shaw Park, 2250 West Jefferson Boulevard.
- Jefferson-Vassie D. Wright Memorial Branch Library, 2211 W. Jefferson Boulevard. In 1987, the Jefferson branch library was added to the National Register of Historic Places.

== Education ==
LAUSD has three schools within the Jefferson Park boundaries:

- Mid City Magnet - 3150 West Adams Boulevard
- Celerity Nascent Charter - 3417 West Jefferson Boulevard
- Sixth Avenue Elementary - 3109 Sixth Avenue

== Transportation ==
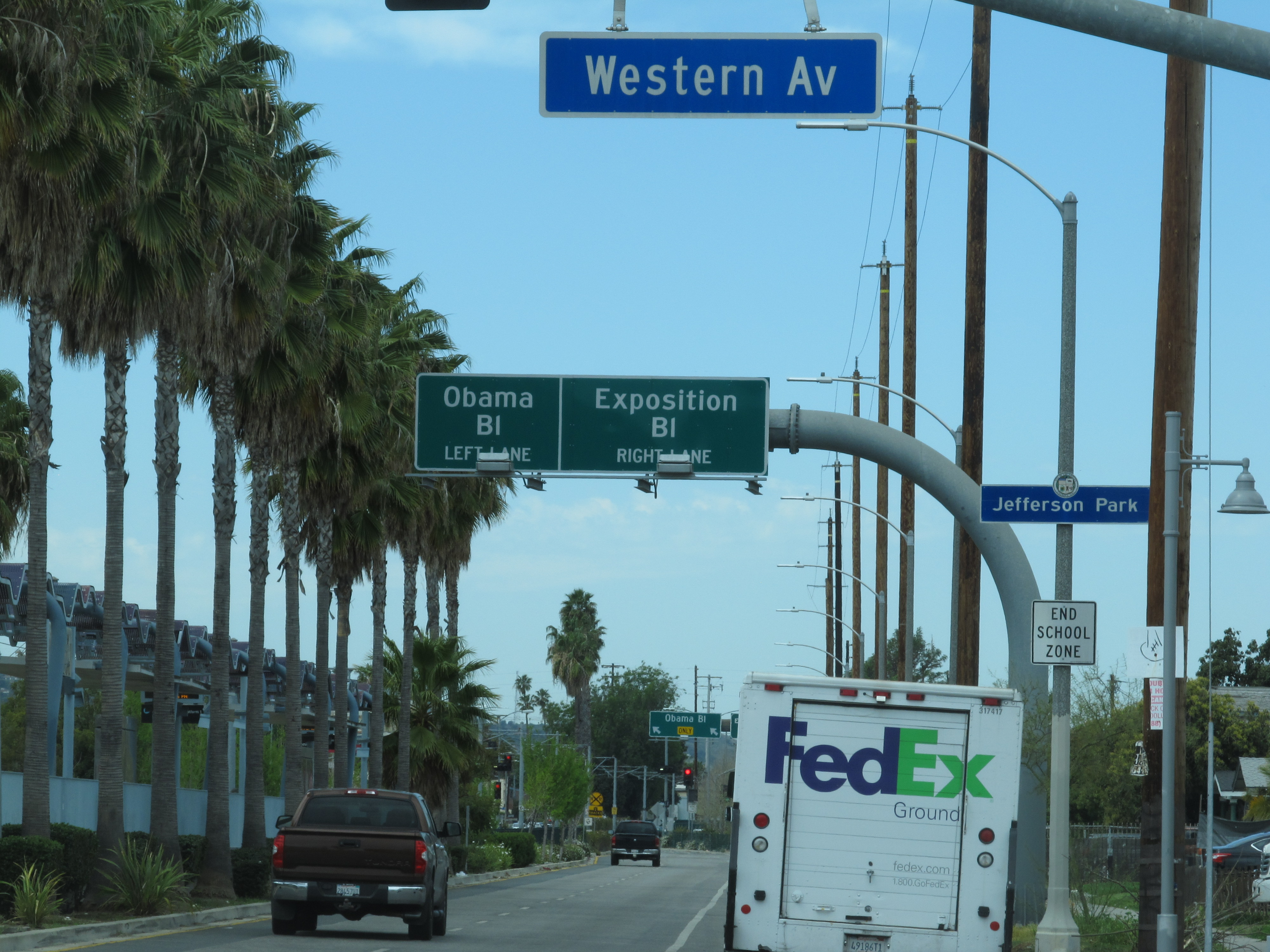
Expo/Western station (on left) in Jefferson Park

- The Metro E Line has two stations in Jefferson Park, both along Jefferson Boulevard: Expo/Crenshaw station and Expo/Western station. As of October 7, 2022, the Expo/Crenshaw station serves as a transfer point between the E Line and the Metro K Line.
- Metro Local bus routes 14, 35, 37, 38, 207 and 209 also serves Jefferson Park.

== Notable people ==
- Hattie McDaniel, actress, the first African-American to win an Academy Award, 2173 W. 31st Street.
- Eric Dolphy, 1593 W 36th Street
- Jack Johnson, American professional boxer, 2130 W 29th Street
- Paul Revere Williams, 1271 W 35th Street
- Betty Hill, American civil rights and women's rights activist
