= Willie Middlebrook (artist) =

American photographer (1957–2012)

- Born: August 11, 1957; Detroit, Michigan
- Died: May 5, 2012 (aged 54); Los Angeles, California
- Known for: photography

Willie Robert Middlebrook, Jr. (August 11, 1957, in Detroit, MI – May 5, 2012, in Los Angeles, CA) was an American photographer, artist and strong advocate for the African-American community in Los Angeles. He received many honors during his lifetime, including two Visual Artist Fellowships in photography from the National Endowment for the Arts, and many commissions for public works including the Los Angeles Metro Expo/Crenshaw Station. His work has been collected by major museums including the Art Institute of Chicago, the Cleveland Museum of Art, the Los Angeles County Museum of Art. and the Smithsonian American Art Museum.

HIs work has been exhibited at the Studio Museum in Harlem and LACMA.

With two degrees, an Associate of Arts degree in Art / Photography from Compton Community College and a Certificate in Design from the Communicative Arts Academy, his legacy includes teaching at many institutions from Watts Towers Arts Center to the California State University Los Angeles as well as being on the advisory committee for the Photography Department at his amla mater, Compton Community College.

The social activism and outreach he made to the Greater Los Angeles community was honored many times, including being awarded a City of Los Angeles Individual Artist Fellowship grant from the Department of Cultural Affairs in 2009. This was after over 20 years of awards and acknowledgment including three commendations from the Los Angeles City Council for his photography, and being named a "Hometown Hero" by the City of Compton. His influence reached much further than Los Angeles from his work being shown nationally in gallery settings, to his work as a director for the Society for Photographic Education.

As a fine artist, he is best known for his works photographing the African-American people and communities in greater Los Angeles with dignity and respect. He is also well known for his photographic printing techniques, where he has painted photographic emulsion thickly, in a dripping fashion on surfaces, and then exposing this photosensitive material to make a print. He would do this in multiple layers. Later he moved to more digital processes, to achieve his multi-layered effects.

Middlebrook died of a stroke in Culver City, California on May 5, 2012.

Middlebrook's work was included in the 2025 exhibition Photography and the Black Arts Movement, 1955–1985 at the National Gallery of Art.
