= Betty Hill (activist) =

American activist (1876–1960)

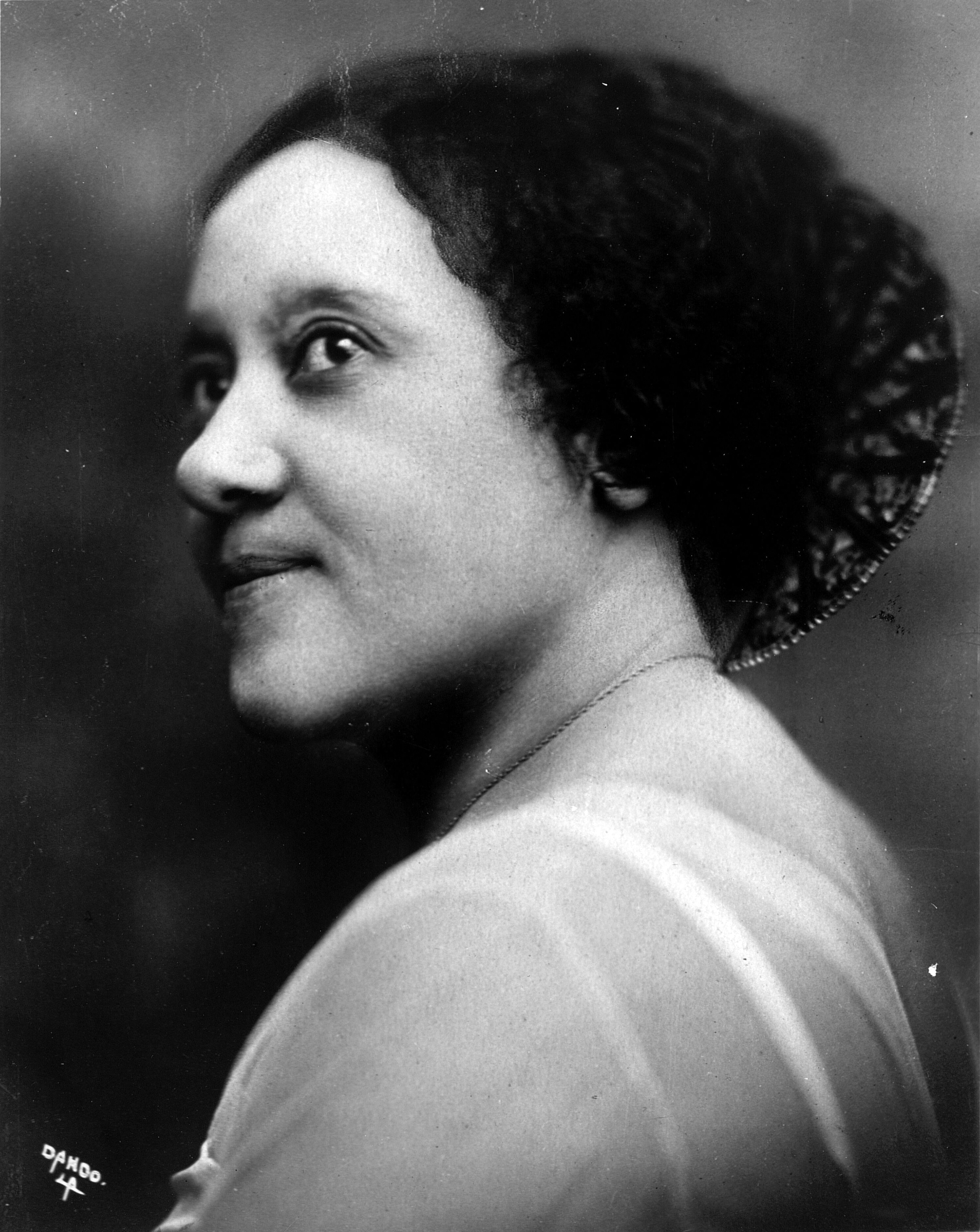
Betty Hill

Betty Hill (1876–1960) was an American civil rights and women’s rights activist in the early 20th-century. Her efforts were significant in making certain that segregation and racial discrimination were unable to gain a foothold in Southern California as they did in the South.

== Early life ==
Betty Hill was born Rebecca Jane Lapsley around 1876 in Nashville, Tennessee. Her father built the first school for African Americans in Davidson County, Tennessee. It is believed that her grandfather purchased his wife out of slavery. She attended her father's school and later attended public school in Nashville. She studied religion at Roger Williams University, an all-black institution in Nashville that was founded in 1866. It originally opened as a college for ex-slaves, and one of its founders was her (probable) uncle Daniel L. Lapsley, an attorney and justice of the peace who was forced to leave the state due to racial persecution. Roger Williams University was closed in 1905, reopened in 1909, and merged with LeMoyne-Owen College in Memphis in 1927.

By 1898 she was married to a Buffalo soldier, also from Nashville, named Abraham Houston Hill, a sergeant in Company B of the 24th Infantry Regiment. At that time he was stationed in Oklahoma, but soon took part in the Spanish–American War. After a brief return to the United States he took part in the Philippine–American War of 1902. His wife, Betty went with him. In 1905, Sgt. Hill was noted as a distinguished marksman and expert rifleman who made the top score at the infantrymen’s competition for the United States Army, and his skill was reported in newspapers across the country.

Later, after the retirement of their mutual friend Lt. Col. Allen Allensworth, the chaplain of the 24th Infantry, she reportedly briefly took over chaplain duties until a new chaplain was assigned for duty. If so, it is uncertain when exactly this was. Allensworth retired from the Army on April 7, 1906, and his replacement, Rev. Washington E. Gladden of Denver, took over chaplain duties in early May, but Allensworth was reported to have been relieved from duty with his regiment and forced to retire on July 1, 1905. According to Claude Hudson, a long-time president of the Los Angeles NAACP, she held this role for a period of about nine months.

In 1908 the couple was living at Madison Barracks, in Jefferson County, New York. Sgt. Hill retired from the Army in 1913 and the couple moved to Los Angeles, where Lt. Col. Allensworth retired to in 1905. The Hills chose a modest home at 1655 W. 37th Place in Los Angeles, near the intersection of Exposition Blvd. and Western Ave., in the West Jefferson District. It is less than a mile and half from the University of Southern California (USC) and Exposition Park. (Today the house and homesite are listed as a Los Angeles Cultural Monument.)

Meanwhile Col. Allensworth participated in the formation of the historically black town of Allensworth in Tulare County, in central California. Many of the earliest residents of the town of Allensworth were retired members of the 24th Infantry. The Hills were among those who purchased land in Allensworth. Today the land is used for growing crops.

== Life in Los Angeles ==
After moving to Los Angeles, Mrs. Hill quickly became involved in a local church and taught Sunday school. She also became a political activist. Although she greatly respected Booker T. Washington and his emphasis on self-reliance, she also supported the move to political action promoted by W. E. B. Du Bois. In 1913, Dr. John Somerville (who, along with his wife Vada, were the first two black graduates of the University of Southern California [USC] School of Dentistry) wrote a letter to the headquarters of the NAACP in New York saying that there was great interest in starting a chapter in Los Angeles. One of those mentioned was Rebecca Hill. The Los Angeles branch was founded in the home of the Somervilles the following year. The founders were the Somervilles, E. Burton Ceruti, Charles Alexander, John Shackelford, Betty Hill, Rev. Joseph Johnson, W. T. Cleghorn, and Dr. Charles Edward Block. Dr. Block became its first president and Ceruti, its legal advisor.

On September 14, 1928, the Somervilles opened the Hotel Somerville on 4225 S. Central Ave. It was built to accept black visitors since other hotels in Los Angeles did not. Abraham Hill served on the advisory board when stock was issued on the hotel. Betty Hill was in attendance at its grand opening, which attracted about 5000 people. After the 1929 stock market crash, it was sold and renamed the Dunbar Hotel (after poet Paul L. Dunbar). It was the site for the first NAACP convention in the western United States. Next to the Dunbar Hotel lay the famous Club Alabam, originally the Club Apex and founded by musician Curtis Mosby. Performers, which not only included world-famous musicians but actors and sports figures, stayed at the Dunbar while they visited the Club Alabam.

In 1920, Betty Hill helped form the Westside Homeowner’s Association to fight acts of bigotry and self-protection. Later she would use her position in this association to create a major victory in her battle for equal rights in Los Angeles. After the Los Angeles Playground Commission initiated a policy of discriminating against African Americans, Hill went into action. The Playground Commission created a policy where African Americans could only use the new city swimming pool in Exposition Park on "colored" days. Determined to win through persistence, she went to court and in 1931 Judge Walter S. Gates ruled against the racist policy. When the City Council was on the verge of appealing Judge Gates’ decision, Betty Hill lobbied each city councilperson individually until the time for an appeal ran out. This became known as the infamous "swimming pool case".

On November 28, 1929, Hill founded the Women’s Republican Study Club. Political study clubs were fairly common for middle and upper-class white women during the early 20th century, but this was the first of its kind for black women in California. Political study clubs existed since the late 19th century, growing in prominence as the passage of the twentieth amendment neared. Mrs. George Bass began Democratic study clubs in 1919, and the Republicans quickly followed suit. Jeannette Carter (1886–1964), a Washington, D.C. attorney, founded the first Republican study club for women, called the Women’s Republican National Political Study Club, in 1923. Carter published two magazines in support of the club’s positions, The Political Recorder in 1925, which was supplanted by her The Women’s Voice in 1939. Carter’s club faltered by 1940.

Betty Hill’s Women’s Republican Study Club was, as Catherine Rymph writes, "one of the more vocal clubs." It not only sought to promote African Americans and fight racial discrimination, it also fought against the New Deal and policies that were seen as collectivist and advanced the cause of the Republican Party. Being a realist, however, after the mass migration of African Americans from the Republican to the Democratic Party in the 1930s, she changed the name to the Women’s Political Study Club.

During her 1945 visit to Washington, D.C., she was appalled by the racial conditions that existed in the capital city of the United States. This was toward the end of World War II, after her friend Charlotta Bass and others had led the Double V campaign to end racial segregation in the military and at home. In response to what she saw, she composed a bill to end racial discrimination in the nation’s capital. Bill 5629 was sent to Congressman Gordon McDonough on February 28, 1946, who submitted it. It never made it to a committee and died. However, through Mrs. Hill’s Women’s Political Study Club, she was selected to go to Washington in person as an envoy to present President Harry S. Truman with a resolution condemning bias in the Capital. The resolution, signed by whites and African Americans, not only called for an end to bias in Washington but pointed out that many foreign diplomats leave the country with an impression that discrimination is government policy.

Seeking support from what she believed were allies in the same cause, in September 1946 Hill sent a copy of the resolution to the president of the California Council of Republican Women, Barbara Whittiker. Unsure what to do, she consulted an advisor who said, "Leave it to Betty Hill to bring up with some headache." Hill’s resolution was never brought up for discussion and the matter was dropped.

Many of her efforts are responsible for the elimination of the Jim Crow dining room at Los Angeles General Hospital, securing the placement of the first Black intern there, the first Black in the Department of History, and the first resident physician of internal medicine at Los Angeles General Hospital; the first Black instructor in the Riverside public school system; and the first Black in the Los Angeles County Department of Charities, Collection Department, the first black deputy sheriff, and the first black on the County Board of Morticians.

Although officially President Franklin D. Roosevelt ended racial discrimination in the military, it still existed at that time. When the military refused to bring back World War II fighter pilot Captain William R. Melton to active duty, Betty Hill, the WPSC, and California Congressman Gordon L. McDonough went to work and got results. On February 6, 1949, Captain Melton received his orders to report to duty.

Hill encouraged furthering the education of young people. Afternoon tea parties raised money and facilitated funding scholarships for students to further their education. Some of these tea parties were given by the WPSC. However, a number of these scholarships were given through her active participation and as a supporter in Zeta Phi Beta sorority.

Betty Hill was a founding member of the Los Angeles branch of the, National Association for the Advancement of Colored People (NAACP), which was formed in 1913. She served as a Vice President for over 12 years. Beyond her activities with the NAACP and the WPSC, she helped initiate the Urban League's Los Angeles chapter; was a Republican State Central Committeewoman of Southern California, 63rd District; was active with the Eastside Settlement House, and the National Council of Women; was the first chairperson of Girls Reserve of the YWCA, 12th Street Branch; the Vice-President of the Organization of National Defense, West Coast; and was also a delegate to the 1940 Republican National Convention in Philadelphia (the first African American female west of the Rockies to serve as a delegate).

Hill was probably the first African American to run a political campaign. In 1932, Senator Samuel M. Shortridge, the state's junior senator (the senior senator was Hiram Johnson), ran an uphill battle for re-election. After he supported a federal judgeship for a judge unpopular in Black America, Senator Shortridge lost a great deal of support among California's African American community. In a desperate move, he asked Hill to manage his bid for re-election. She was never able to find sufficient support and he lost his seat in the Republican primary. Despite his loss, that Shortridge chose Betty Hill is an indication of her power and influence. Additionally, it was a huge risk for a white senator to ask an African American woman to run a campaign while America was still in the throes of Jim Crow. (The next African American woman to manage the campaign of a major white politician was not until 2000, when Donna Brazile became Vice President Al Gore's campaign manager.)

== Legacy ==
On May 16, 1980, with the support of Councilman Robert Farrell, the Denker Building at the Denker Senior Citizen Center was renamed the Betty Hill building in her honor. Then on June 6, 1980, the Denker Senior Citizen Center was renamed the Betty Hill Senior Citizen Center. Located at 3570 S. Denker Ave., Los Angeles, it is less than a mile from her house on 37th Place. On April 13, 2005, after a vote of 12-0 before the Los Angeles City Council, and through the efforts of her great-grandniece, Betty Hill’s home at 1655 West 37th Place was designated Los Angeles Cultural Monument number 791 (see List of Los Angeles Historic-Cultural Monuments in South Los Angeles).

== Sources ==
- Beasley, Delilah L. The Negro Trailblazers of California. (Los Angeles: Times Printing and Binding House, 1919).
- Flamming, Douglas. Bound For Freedom: Black Los Angeles in Jim Crow America. Berkeley and Los Angeles: University of California Press, 2005.
- Freeman, Jo. A Room at a Time: How Women Entered Party Politics. Lanham, MD: Rowman & Littlefield, 2002.
- Ramsey, Eleanor M., and Janice S. Lewis. "Black Americans in California." Five Views: An Ethnic Historic Site Survey California. (Sacramento: California Department of Parks and Recreation Office of Historic Preservation, 1988). Online at: https://web.archive.org/web/20080502214050/http://www.nps.gov/history/history/online_books/5views/5views2h7.htm
- Royal, Alice, with Mickey Ellinger and Scott Brady. Allensworth: The Freedom Colony. Berkeley, CA: Heyday Books, 2008.ISBN 978-1-59714-091-1
- Rymph, Catherine E. Republican Women: Feminism and Conservatism Through the Rise of the New Right. Chapel Hill: University of North Carolina Press, 2006.
- Schubert, Irene Kettunen, and Frank N. Schubert. On the Trail of the Buffalo Soldier II: New and Revised Biographies of African Americans in the U.S. Army, 1866-1917. Lanham, Md. : Scarecrow Press, 2004.
- Terborg-Penn, Rosalyn. African American Women in the Struggle for the Vote, 1850-1920. Bloomington: Indiana University Press, 1998.
