= Telegraph Road (Los Angeles County, California) =

Arterial road in Los Angeles County

Telegraph Road is a northwest–southeast arterial road in the eastern portion of Los Angeles County.

== Route description ==
Its northwest end is at S. Downey Road near E. Olympic Blvd. in Los Angeles. It goes through Santa Fe Springs and its southeast end is at Imperial Highway near La Mirada Blvd in La Mirada.

Telegraph Road is mainly served by Metro Local line 62, particularly between Olympic Boulevard and Norwalk Boulevard, and also by a brief section of Line 120, particularly east of Norwalk Boulevard.
