= Expo/Crenshaw station =

Los Angeles Metro Rail station

Expo/Crenshaw
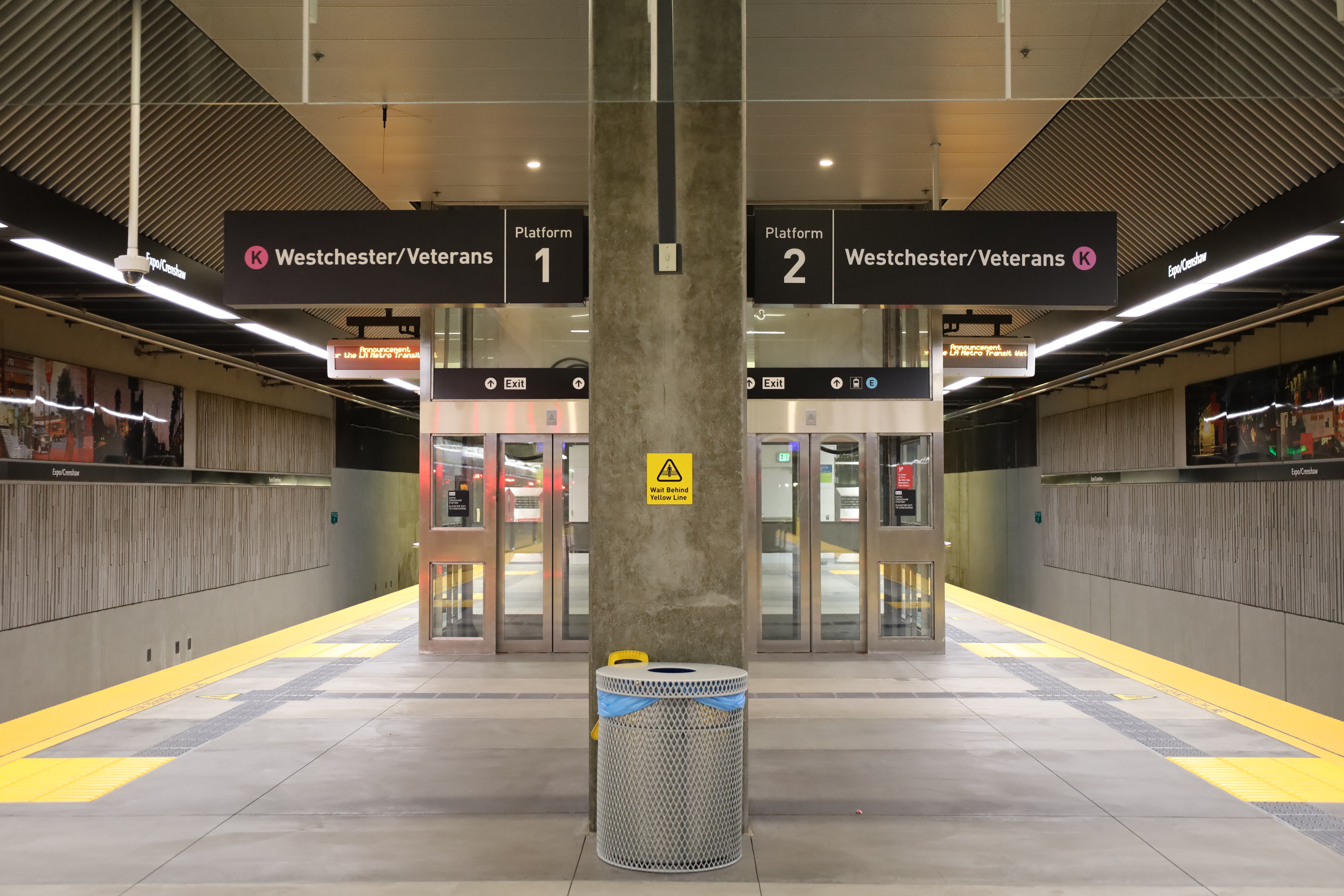
- Expo/Crenshaw station K Line platform in 2022

General information
- Location: 3428 Exposition Boulevard (E Line); 3630 South Crenshaw Boulevard (K Line); Los Angeles, California
- Coordinates: 34.0225°N 118.3350°W
- Owner: Los Angeles County Metropolitan Transportation Authority
- Platforms: 2 side platforms (E Line); 1 island platform (K Line)
- Tracks: 2 (E Line); 2 (K Line)
- Connections: LADOT DASH; Los Angeles Metro Bus

Construction
- Structure type: At-grade (E Line); Underground (K Line)
- Parking: 225 spaces (closed Sundays)
- Cycle facilities: Racks
- Accessible: Yes

History
- Opened: October 17, 1875
- Rebuilt: 2012, 2022
- Former names: 11th Ave

Passengers
- FY 2026: 5,058 (avg. wkdy boardings)

Services
Preceding station	Metro Rail	Following station
Farmdale toward Santa Monica	E Line	Expo/Western toward East LA
Terminus	K Line	Martin Luther King Jr. toward Redondo Beach
Location

Expo/Crenshaw station is a light rail station in the Los Angeles Metro Rail system located in the Jefferson Park neighborhood of Los Angeles at the intersection of Crenshaw and Exposition Boulevards. During construction, it was known as the Crenshaw station. The station is the transfer point between the E Line, which stops at two street-level platforms alongside Exposition Boulevard, and the K Line, which has its northern terminus at a single island platform under Crenshaw Boulevard.

== History ==
=== E Line ===
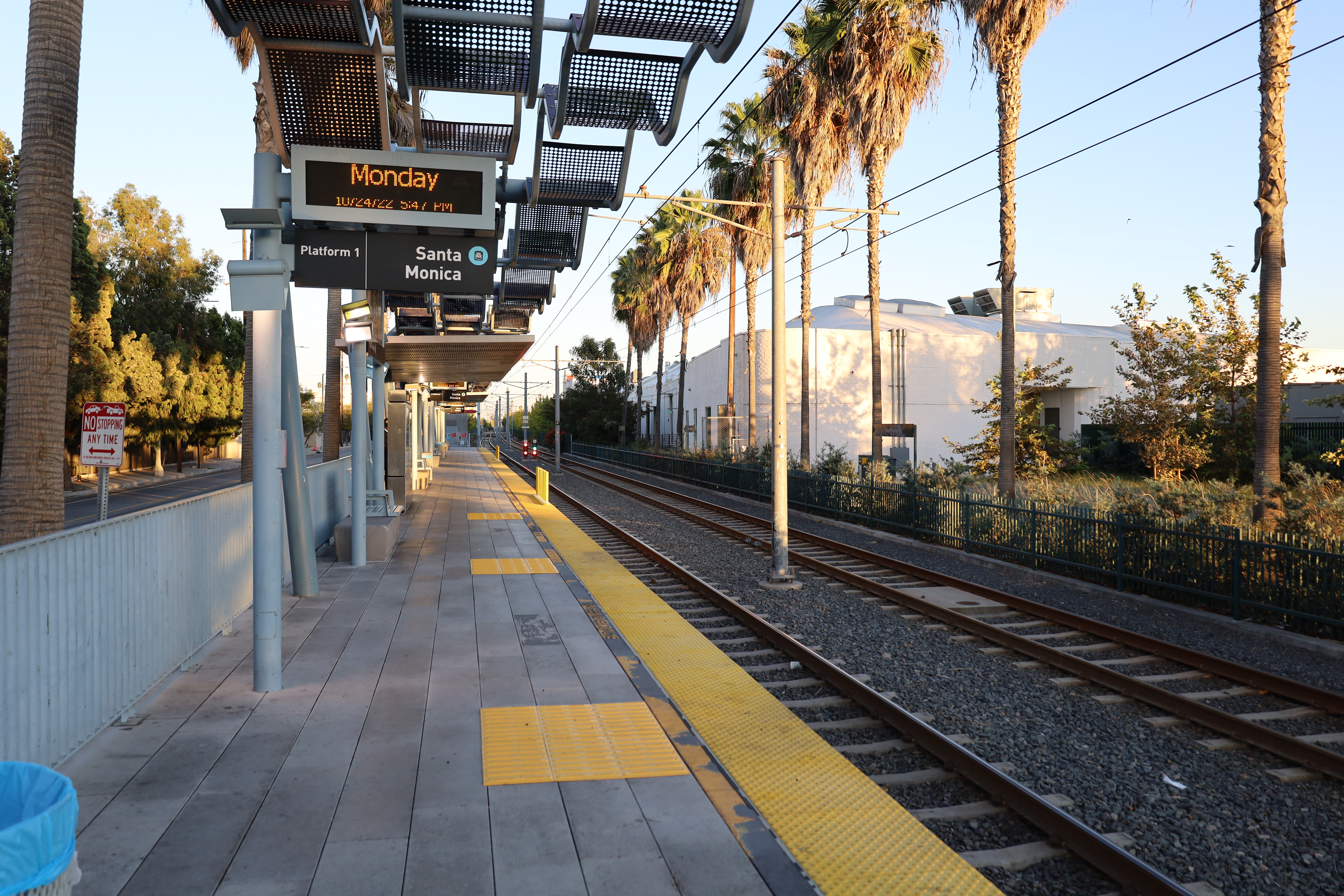
At-grade E Line platform in 2022

The station's predecessor was originally little more than a stop marker on the Los Angeles and Independence Railroad and Pacific Electric interurban line. Passenger service ended on September 30, 1953, with closure of the Santa Monica Air Line, and the station was eventually dismantled.

A new station with near-side platforms at Exposition and Crenshaw Blvd opened on Saturday, April 28, 2012, completely rebuilt for the service on the Expo Line. It opened during the completion of Phase I of the Expo Line from 7th Street/Metro Center to Culver City. Regular scheduled service commenced Monday, April 30, 2012. The Expo Line was integrated into the newly designated E Line with the opening of the Regional Connector in 2023.

=== K Line ===
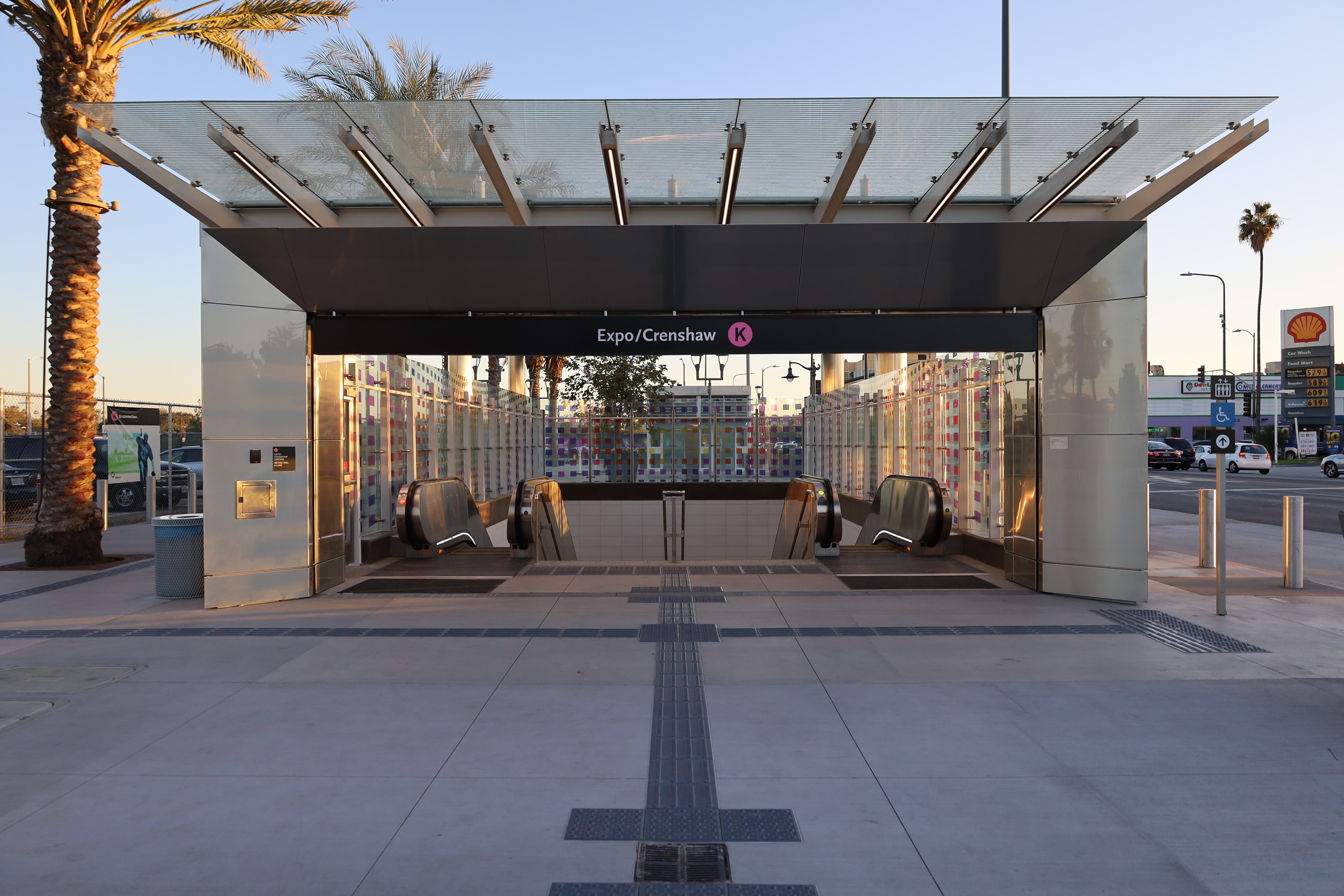
Head house of the K Line station

Expo/Crenshaw became a transfer station when the K Line service began in late 2022. The Metro staff board ruled out an at-grade junction station between the K Line and E Line, stating that it was operationally not feasible. (Such a junction would result in three rail lines—the K, E, and the A Lines—sharing the single pair of tracks on Flower Street leading into 7th Street/Metro Center station, putting those tracks well above their capacity limit and causing delays.) Instead, a light rail subway station for the K Line was constructed under Crenshaw Boulevard between Exposition Boulevard and Obama Boulevard (formerly Rodeo Road) in order to allow for an extension of the K Line north through a D Line station and to the B Line's Hollywood/Highland station, where it will terminate via a route to be determined.

Metro held a ceremonial ribbon cutting ceremony for the station on July 8, 2022, attended by U.S. Secretary of Transportation Pete Buttigieg. The station opened on October 7, 2022.

== Notable places nearby ==
- Crenshaw Square
- Holiday Bowl
- West Angeles Church of God in Christ

== Service ==
=== Station layout ===
The E Line platforms are located adjacent to Exposition Boulevard on either side of its intersection with Crenshaw Boulevard, a major L.A. thoroughfare. The entrance/exit for the underground K Line platform is located at the southeast corner of the intersection. The E Line uses "near-side" platforms which are positioned on opposite sides of the intersection, and trains always stop at the platform before crossing the intersection. Because of the E Line platforms positioning with no under or above-ground pathways, passengers transferring between the E and K lines must cross the street or tracks depending on the desired direction of travel.

=== Hours and frequency ===
E Line service hours are from approximately 4:30 a.m. and 11:45 p.m daily. Trains operate every 8 minutes during peak hours, Monday to Friday. Trains run every 10 minutes, during midday on weekdays and weekends, from 9:00 a.m. to 7:00 p.m. Night and early morning service is approximately every 20 minutes every day.

K Line service hours are approximately from 4:30 a.m. until 12:00 a.m. daily. Trains operate every 10 minutes throughout most of the day. Trains run every 20 minutes after 8:00 p.m. every day and before 8:00 a.m. on weekends.

=== Connections ===
As of June 6, 2025, the following connections are available:

- LADOT DASH: Midtown
- Los Angeles Metro Bus: 38, 209, 210

=== Parking ===
The station does not have its own parking lot, but instead leases 225 stalls in a 500-stall parking structure owned by the West Angeles Church of God in Christ for use as a park and ride. As part of this arrangement, the garage is not open to Metro passengers on Sunday when the church holds services.

== Station artwork ==
The station incorporates artwork by several artists.

The art panels on the E Line platforms were created by artist Willie Middlebrook; his untitled installation uses manipulated photographs to depict the diverse population in interaction with the earth and the environment. The colors used were inspired by the stained glass windows of the nearby West Angeles Church of God in Christ.

The K Line station entrance artwork is Inside Out – Outside In – Inside Out by Erwin Redl, a series of glazed glass panels with colored squares. By day these panels appear to project colors onto nearby surfaces and at night they make the station entrance appear as an illuminated jewel box. Like the earlier E Line art panels, the colors selected were inspired by the stained glass windows of the West Angeles Cathedral.

The mezzanine level features two mosaic murals called At the Same Time by artist Rebeca Méndez. One mural features vertical segments showing the progression of time over 24 hours in 15 minute increments, portraying stars, the moon, and cloudy skies. The other mural depicts a lofted bird wing, visible while descending the escalators to the platform to evoke a long-distance avian migration, with the wings also referencing the angels called upon during sermons at the West Angeles Cathedral.

The K Line platform has collages entitled Layered Histories by Jaime Scholnick. To create the piece, the artist used 11,800 photographs of the surrounding neighborhood to depict a colorful and abstracted street scenes, creating a time capsule reflective of the spirit of the surrounding community.
