= History of Los Angeles International Airport =

History of major American airport

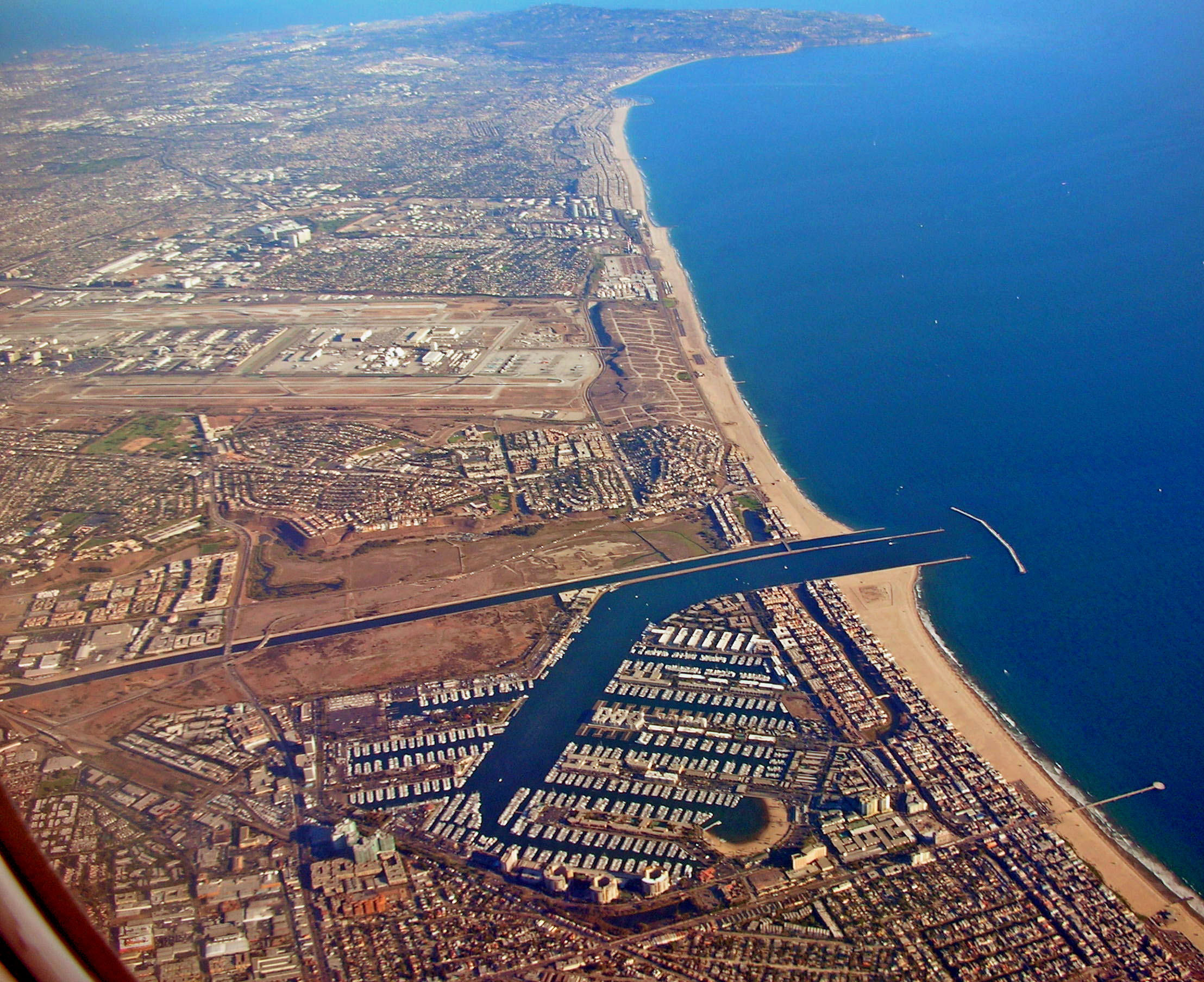
Looking southward over Marina Del Rey and the western end of LAX to the Palos Verdes Peninsula in the background

Los Angeles International Airport is a major American airport in the United States that was constructed in 1928.

== 1926–1929: Mines Field ==
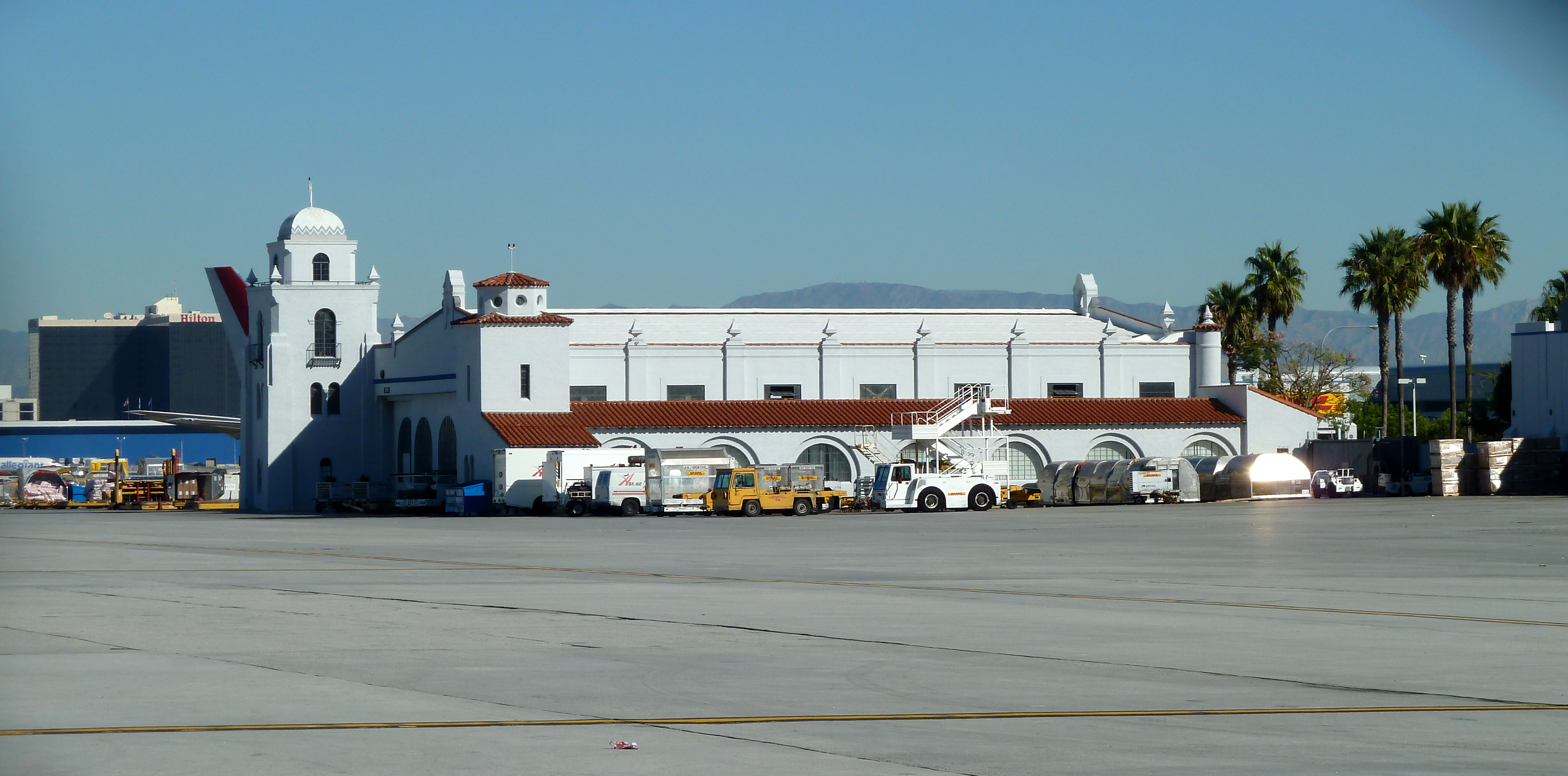
Hangar No. 1 was the first structure at LAX, built in 1929, restored in 1990 and remaining in active use.

In 1926, the Los Angeles City Council and the Chamber of Commerce recognized the need for the city to have its own airport to tap into the fledgling, but quickly growing aviation industry. Several locations were considered, but the final choice was a 640-acre (1.00 sq mi; 260 ha) field in the southern part of Westchester. The location had been promoted by real estate agent William W. Mines, and Mines Field as it was known, had already been selected to host the 1928 National Air Races. On August 13, 1928 the city leased the land and the newly formed Department of Airports began converting the fields once used to grow wheat, barley and lima beans into dirt landing strips.

The airport opened on October 1, 1928 and the first structure, Hangar No. 1, was erected in 1929 by the Curtiss-Wright company for use as a flight school and to service its small fleet of aircraft. The Spanish Colonial Revival style building still stands at the airport, remaining in active use and listed on the National Register of Historic Places.

== 1930–1939: Los Angeles Municipal Airport ==
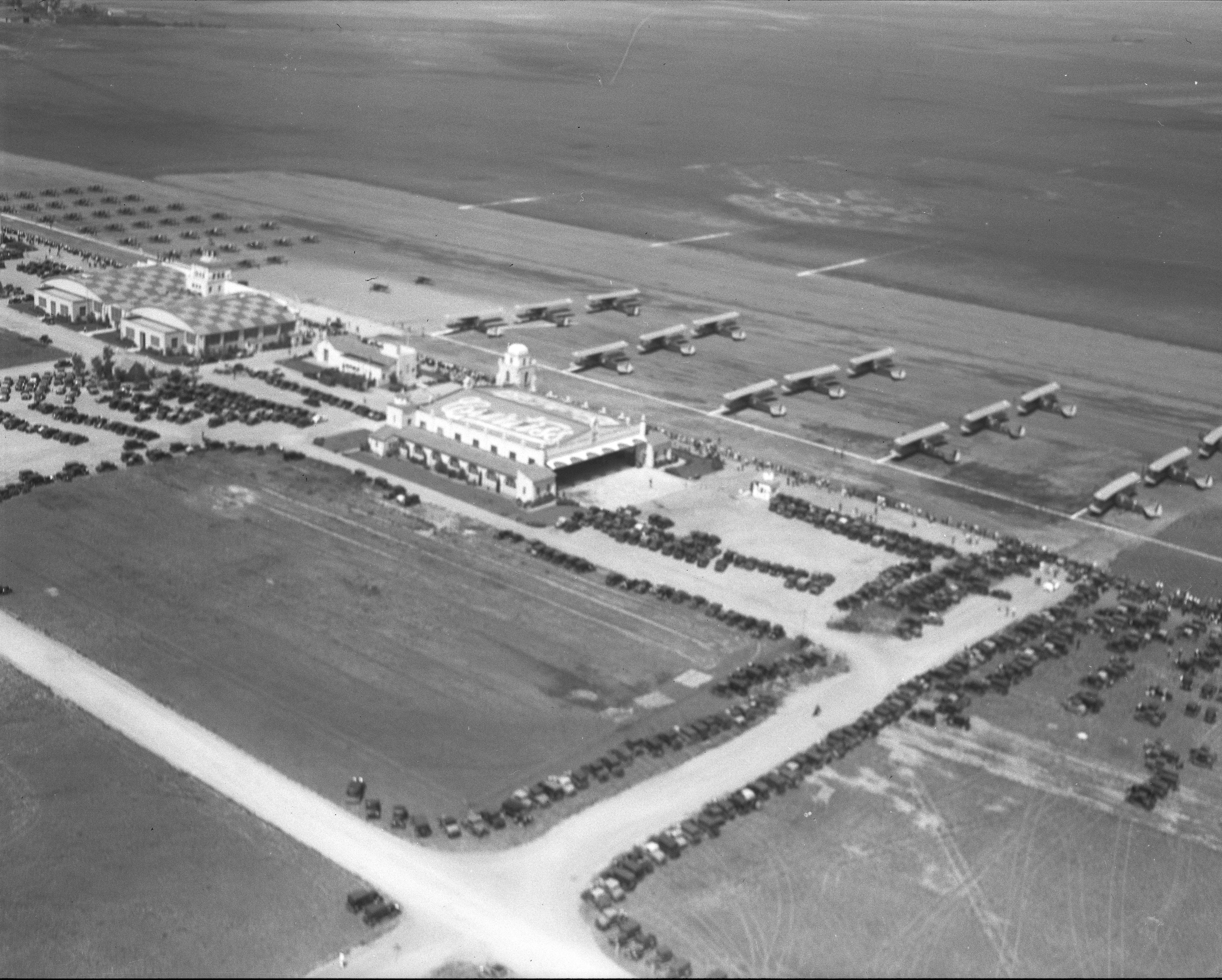
Los Angeles Municipal Airport on Army Day, c. 1931

The next year, the dirt runway was replaced with oiled decomposed granite which could be used year-round and two more hangars, a restaurant, office space, and a control tower were built. On June 7, 1930, the facility was dedicated and renamed Los Angeles Municipal Airport.

The airport was used by private pilots and flying schools, but the city’s vision was that Los Angeles would become the main passenger hub for the area. However, the airlines were not on board.

The airport failed to entice any carriers away from the established Burbank Airport (then known as Union Air Terminal, and later Lockheed) or the Grand Central Airport in Glendale. (By 1940 the airlines were all at Burbank except for Mexicana's three departures a week from Glendale).

During the Great Depression, the Works Progress Administration funded several improvements including site grading and construction of a new runway, while the city paid for runway and field lights. Still, no airlines moved to the airport.

The city purchased the land under the airport in 1937.

== 1940–1945: Wartime Airfield ==
World War II put a pause on any further development of the airport for passenger use. Before the United States entered the war, the aviation manufacturing companies located around the airport were busy providing aircraft for the allied powers, while the airport flying schools found themselves in high demand. In January 1942, the military assumed control of the airport, stationing P-38 fighter planes at the airfield and building naval gun batteries in the ocean dunes to the west.

Meanwhile, managers at the Los Angeles Department of Airports published a master plan for the land in early 1943 and convinced voters to back a $12.5 million bond for airport improvements. With a plan and funding in place, the airlines were finally convinced to make the move.

== 1946–1960: "Intermediate Facilities" ==
After the end of the war, four temporary terminals called the "Intermediate Facilities" were quickly erected on the north side of the airport and on December 9, 1946, American Airlines, Trans World Airlines (TWA), United Airlines, Southwest Airways and Western Airlines began passenger operations at the airport. Pan American Airways (Pan Am) made the move in January 1947.

The airport was renamed Los Angeles International Airport in 1949.

Sepulveda Boulevard was rerouted c. 1950 to loop around the west ends of the extended east–west runways (now runways 25L and 25R), which by November 1950 were 6,000 feet (1,800 m) long. The Airport Tunnel was completed in 1953 allowing Sepulveda Boulevard to revert to straight and pass beneath the two runways; it was the first tunnel of its kind. For the next few years the two runways were 8,500 feet (2,600 m) long.

The temporary terminals would remain in place for 15 years, but quickly became inadequate, especially as other cities invested in modern facilities. Airport leaders once again convinced voters to back a $59 million bond on June 5, 1956.

On July 10, 1956, Boeing's 707 prototype (the 367-80) visited LAX. The Los Angeles Times said it was its first appearance at a "commercial airport" outside the Seattle area.

The April 1957 Official Airline Guide showed 66 weekday departures on United Airlines, 32 American Airlines, 32 Western Airlines, 27 TWA, nine Southwest, five Bonanza Air Lines and three Mexicana Airlines; also 22 flights a week on Pan American World Airways and five a week on Scandinavian Airlines (the only direct flights from California to Europe).

American Airlines' 707-123s flew the first jet passengers out of LAX to New York in January 1959; the first wide-body jets were TWA's Boeing 747s to New York in early 1970.

In 1958, the architecture firm Pereira & Luckman was contracted to plan the re-design of the airport for the "jet age". The plan, developed with architects Welton Becket, Paul Williams, and senior architect of the Department of Airports Nicholas M. Cirino, called for a series of terminals and parking structures in the central portion of the property, with these buildings connected at the center by a huge steel-and-glass dome. The dome was never built but the Theme Building built in the central area became a focal point visible to people coming to the airport.

== 1961–1979: "Jet age" terminal ==
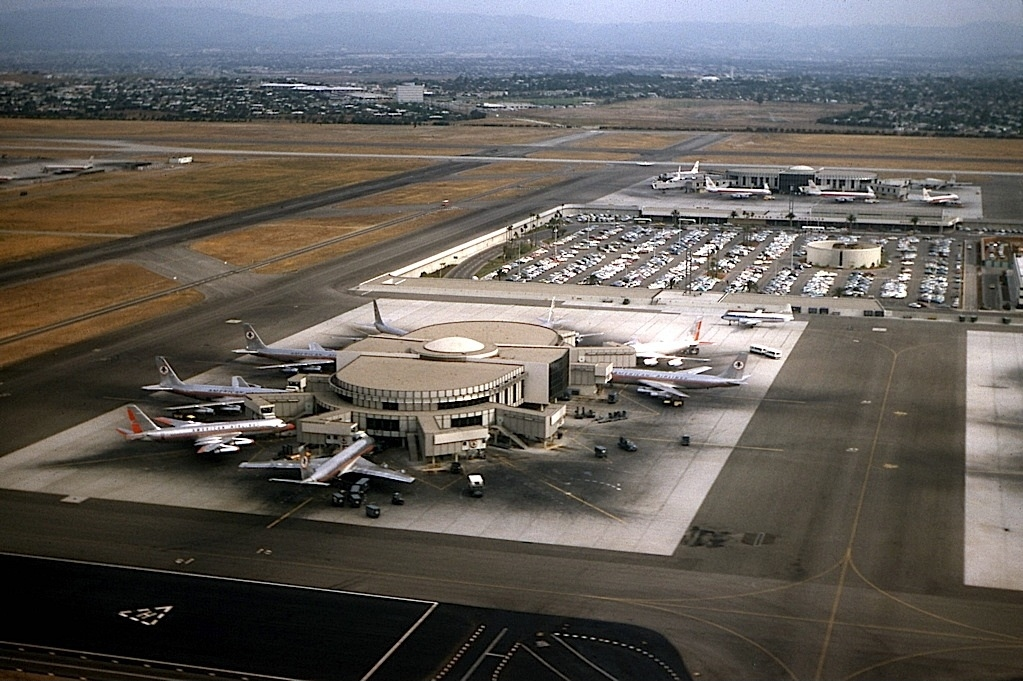
LAX Terminal 4 in 1966

In the new terminal area west of Sepulveda Blvd that started opening in 1961, each terminal had a satellite building out in the middle of the ramp, reached by tunnels from the ticketing area.

The first of the new passenger buildings, Terminals 7 and 8, were opened for United Airlines on June 25, 1961, following opening festivities that lasted several days.

TWA's terminal 3, American's terminal 4 and Western's terminal 5 opened shortly after. Satellite 2 opened as the international terminal several months later, and satellite 6, a "consolidated" terminal for other domestic carriers, was to be the last to open.

By 1964 the airport had international service by Aeronaves, Air France, JAL, TWA, UTA, Varig and Western in addition to Mexicana, Pan Am and SAS.

Since the 1920s, a neighborhood called Surfridge had been on the coastline west of the airport, part of the larger community of Palisades del Rey along with the neighborhood to the north now known as Playa del Rey. When the airlines switched to jet airliners during the 1960s and 1970s and Surfridge's residents complained about noise pollution, the city used its eminent domain powers to condemn and evacuate Surfridge. The government bulldozed the homes but did not bulldoze the streets, and the fenced-off "ghost" streets west of LAX are still there.

== 1980–1989: Olympic expansion ==
A major expansion of the airport came in the early 1980s, ahead of the 1984 Summer Olympic Games.

On July 8, 1982, groundbreaking for the new terminals (Terminal 1 and a new International Terminal) were conducted by Mayor Tom Bradley and World War II aviator General James Doolittle.

The U-shaped roadway past the terminal entrances got a second level, with arriving passengers on the lower level and departing on the upper. Connector buildings between the ticketing areas and the satellite buildings were added, changing the layout to a "pier" design.

Terminal 1 opened in January 1984. The US$123 million, 963,000-square-foot (89,500 m^{2}) International Terminal opened on June 11, 1984, and was named for Bradley. Terminal 2, then two decades old, was rebuilt. Multi-story parking structures were also built in the center of the airport.

== 1990–2004: Airport opposition ==
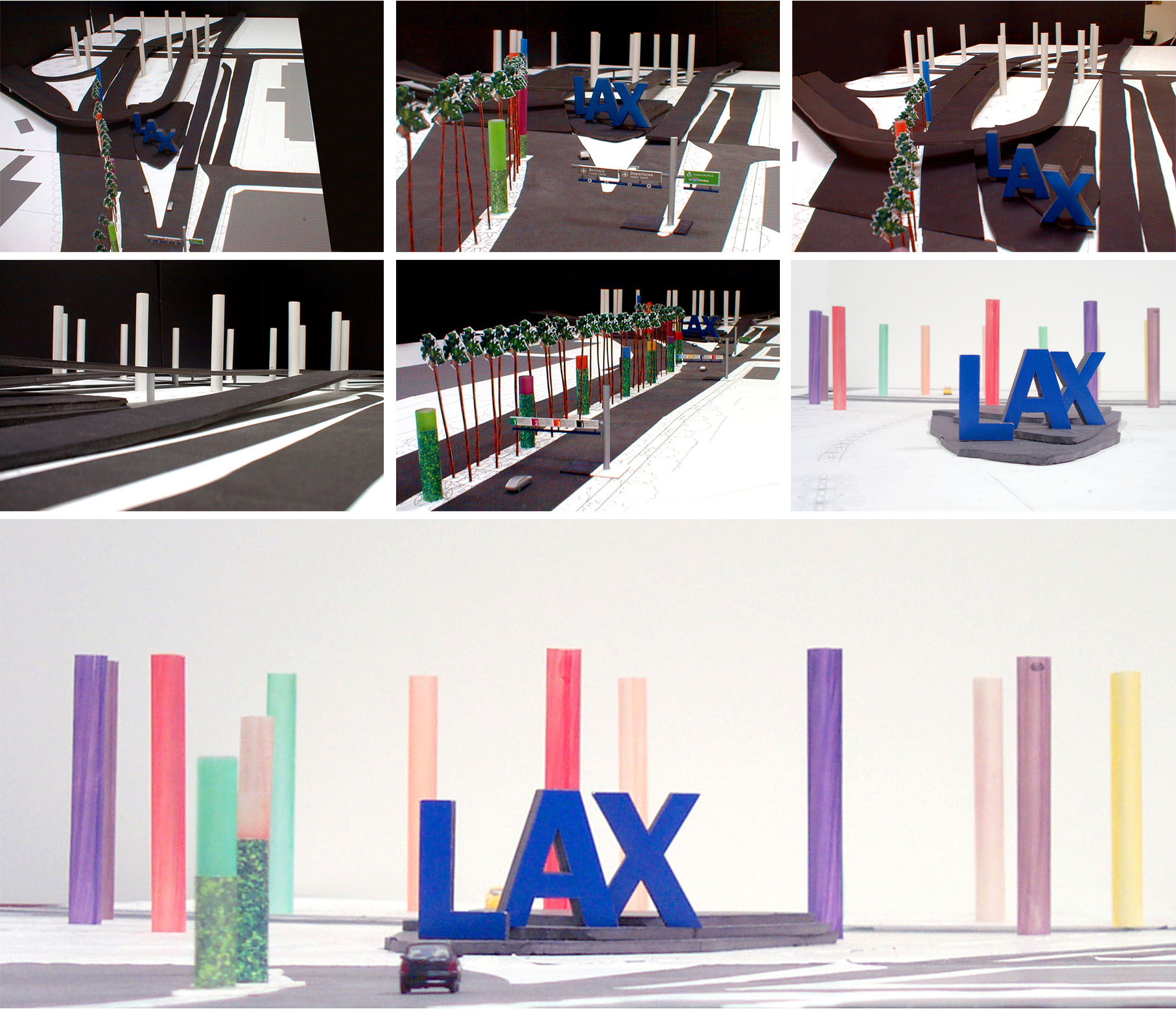
Model for LAX Gateway pylons

Starting in the mid-1990s, under Mayors Richard Riordan and James Hahn, modernization and expansion plans for LAX were prepared, only to be stymied by a coalition of residents who live near the airport. They cited increased noise, pollution and traffic impacts of the project.

On April 29, 1992, the airport closed for cleanup after the 1992 Los Angeles Riots over the Rodney King beating.

The airport closed again as a 2-hour precaution on January 17, 1994 after the Northridge earthquake.

In 1996, a $29 million, 277-foot-tall (84 m) air traffic control tower was built near the Theme Building.

In 2000, the LAX Beautification Design Team, who included LA artists, Paul Tzanetopoulos and Selbert Perkins Design in collaboration with Ted Tokio Tanaka Architects designed a major public art kinetic light installation for the perimeter of the airport, LAX Gateway Pylons, consisting of free-standing translucent, internally-lit glass columns.

The installation consists of a 32-foot high "LAX" signage sculpture, a corridor of eleven 25-60-foot pylons, and a circle of fifteen 100-foot by 12-foot pylons. This new public art installation at the airport entrance offered a welcoming landmark for visitors. The entire sculpture extends for one mile, starting from the smallest light tower (25 ft) at Century Blvd. and Bellanca Ave. and culminating at the "halo" of columns (100 ft.) that surround the "knot" at the entrance of LAX. The LAX Gateway Pylons underwent improvements in 2006, including replacement of stage lighting inside the cylinders with LED lights to conserve energy, facilitate maintenance, and enable on-demand cycling through various color effects.

== 2005–present: Second major expansion ==
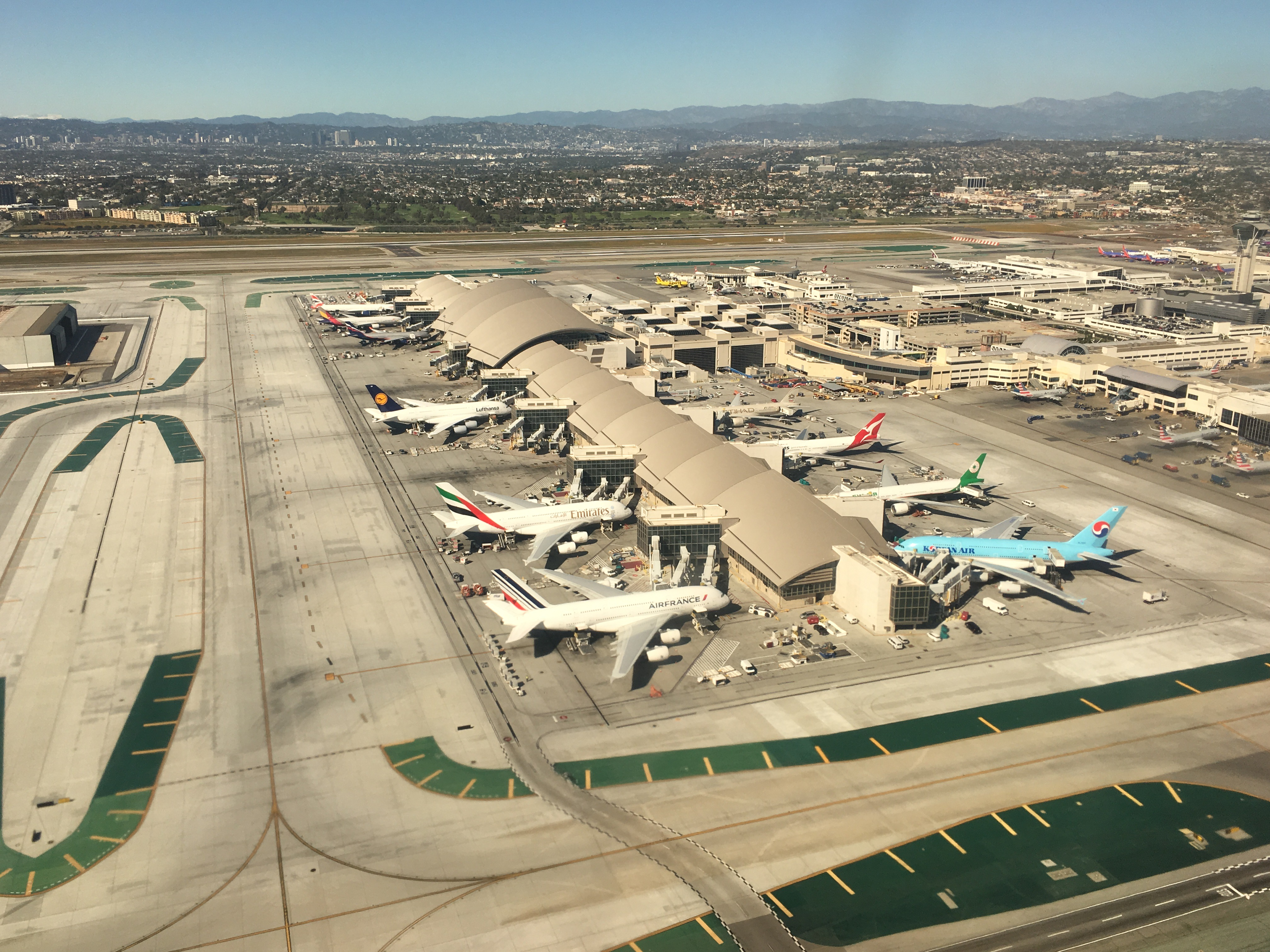
The rebuilt Tom Bradley International Terminal in 2016

In late 2005, newly elected Mayor Antonio Villaraigosa was able to reach a compromise, allowing some modernization to go forward while encouraging future growth among other facilities in the region.

It is illegal to limit the number of passengers that use an airport, but in December 2005 the city agreed to limit the passenger gates to 163. Once passenger usage hits 75 million, a maximum of two gates a year for up to five years will be closed, intending to limit growth to 79 million passengers a year. In exchange civil lawsuits were abandoned, to allow the city to complete badly needed improvements to the airport.

In 2008, plans were unveiled for a $4.11 billion renovation and improvement program to expand and rehabilitate the Tom Bradley International Terminal to accommodate the next generation of larger aircraft, as well as handle the growing number of flights to and from the Southern California region, and to develop the Central Terminal Area (CTA) of the airport to include streamlined passenger processing, public transportation and updated central utility plants.

All of the terminals are being refurbished. Outside of the terminal area, the LAX West Intermodal Transportation Facility with 4,300 parking spaces opened in 2021 replacing the former Lot C. A new LAX/Metro Transit Center and an LAX Rental Car Center (RCC) was built. All will be connected to the terminal area by SkyLink. In the near future, airport managers plan to build two more terminals (0 and 9). All together, these projects are expected to cost of $14 billion and bring LAX's total gates from 146 to 182.
