= LAX City Bus Center =

Bus station serving Los Angeles International Airport

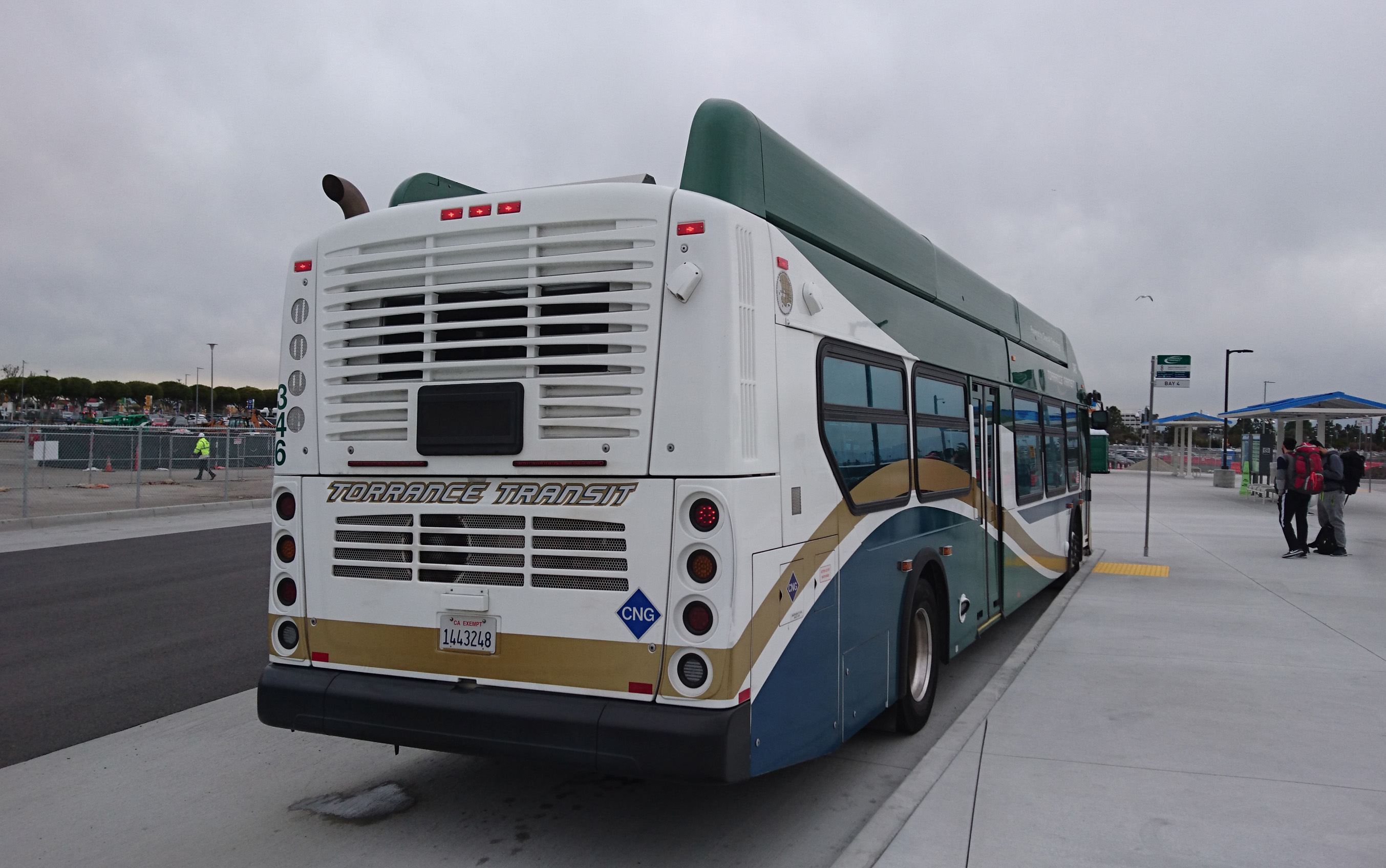
- Torrance Transit bus at LAX City Bus Center platform

General information
- Other names: LAX Transit Center
- Location: 6111 West 96th Street; Los Angeles, California
- Coordinates: 33.9499°N 118.3924°W
- Owner: Los Angeles World Airports
- Platforms: 1 island platform
- Bus stands: 14
- Bus operators: Beach Cities Transit; Big Blue Bus; Culver CityBus; LAX Shuttle; Los Angeles Metro Bus; Torrance Transit

Construction
- Accessible: Yes

History
- Opened: 1984; 42 years ago
- Closed: June 6, 2025; 14 months ago
- Rebuilt: December 7, 2018; 7 years ago
Location

The LAX City Bus Center, also known as the LAX Transit Center, was the main bus station serving the Los Angeles International Airport (LAX) in Los Angeles, California. The LAX City Bus Center, was located about one-half mile (0.8 km) from the Central Terminal Area on 96th Street, east of Sepulveda Boulevard.

LAX Shuttle route C offered free connections between the LAX City Bus Center and the Central Terminal Area, starting at terminal 1, and servicing the terminals in a counter clockwise direction. Route C was discontinued after June 6, 2025 with the opening of the LAX/Metro Transit Center.

The LAX City Bus Center was formerly served by Beach Cities Transit line 109 to Redondo Beach, Culver CityBus lines 6 and Rapid 6 to Culver City and UCLA, Los Angeles Metro Bus lines 102 to South Gate, 111 to Norwalk, 117 to Downey and 232 to Long Beach, Santa Monica Big Blue Bus lines 3 and Rapid 3 to Santa Monica, and Torrance Transit line 8 to Torrance. During the overnight hours, Los Angeles Metro line 40 offered service to Downtown Los Angeles.

In 1984, the LAX City Bus Center opened on 96th Street near Sepulveda Boulevard to easily connect riders to the LAX Terminals. On December 7, 2018, a new US$5,800,000 (equivalent to $7,440,000 in 2025) bus center was opened near the site of the original. The new platform gave airport managers the room required to build the guideway for the new SkyLink. On June 6, 2025, local transit routes were moved to the LAX/Metro Transit Center, which will be connected to the rest of LAX by the Automated People Mover system.
