= Department of Airports =

Department of Airports may refer to:

- Department of Airports (Thailand), a government department of Thailand
- Los Angeles World Airports, a department of the City of Los Angeles
