= LAX/Metro Transit Center =

Intermodal transport hub in Los Angeles, California

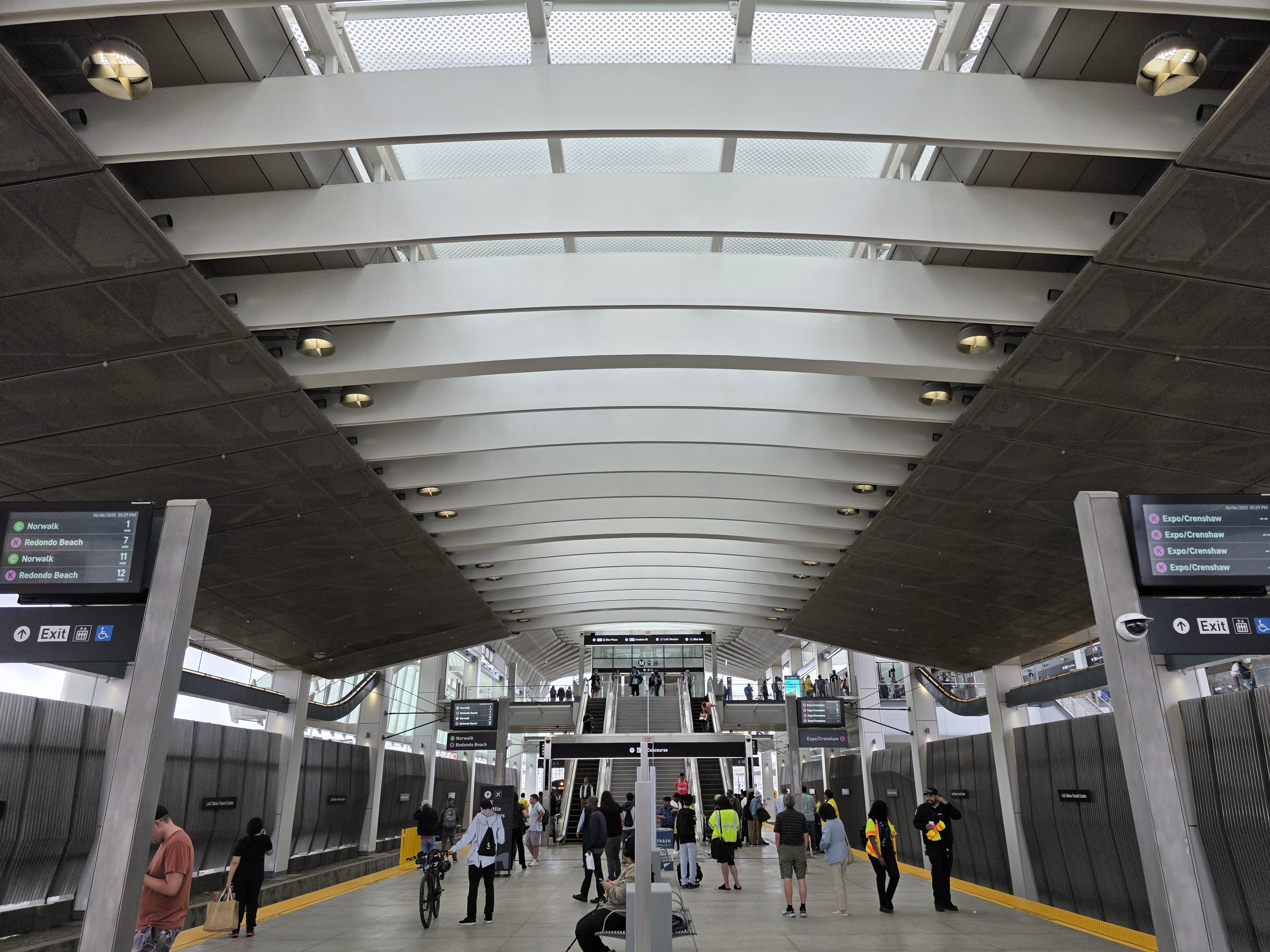
- LAX/Metro Transit Center platform on opening day, June 6, 2025

General information
- Other names: ITF East
- Location: 9225 Aviation Boulevard (Metro); 9600 Aviation Boulevard (APM); Los Angeles, California
- Coordinates: 33°57′00″N 118°22′42″W
- Owner: Los Angeles Metro
- Platforms: 1 island platform (Metro); 1 island platform (APM)
- Tracks: 4 (2 Metro, 2 APM)
- Connections: See connections

Construction
- Structure type: At-grade (Metro); Elevated (APM)
- Parking: Paid parking nearby
- Cycle facilities: Metro Bike Hub
- Accessible: Yes
- Architect: Grimshaw Architects

Other information
- Website: metro.net/lax-metro-transit-center/

History
- Opened: June 6, 2025

Passengers
- FY 2026: 3,188 (avg. wkdy boardings)

Services
Preceding station	Metro Rail	Following station
Terminus	C Line	Aviation/Century toward Norwalk
Westchester/Veterans toward Expo/Crenshaw	K Line	Aviation/Century toward Redondo Beach

Future services
Preceding station	LAWA	Following station
ITF West toward West CTA	SkyLink	RCC Terminus
Location

The LAX/Metro Transit Center is an intermodal transport hub in the Westchester neighborhood of Los Angeles, California. Located near Aviation Boulevard and 96th Street, the facility serves as a transfer point between the Los Angeles Metro Rail system and other modes of transportation. It is served by the C and K rail lines and connects to multiple Metro Bus and municipal bus routes. The facility also includes a customer service center and a Metro Bike Hub. It opened on June 6, 2025.

Los Angeles World Airports (LAWA) refers to the facility as the Intermodal Transportation Facility East (ITF East), and it is the primary Metro Rail connection to Los Angeles International Airport (LAX). Currently passengers travel between the station and the airport terminals via LAX Shuttle buses; SkyLink, an automatic people mover currently under testing, will replace those buses when it opens, although LAWA has not announced an opening date.

== History ==
Since the dismantling of the Pacific Electric system, proposals to connect Los Angeles International Airport (LAX) to the regional rail network have circulated since the 1960s.

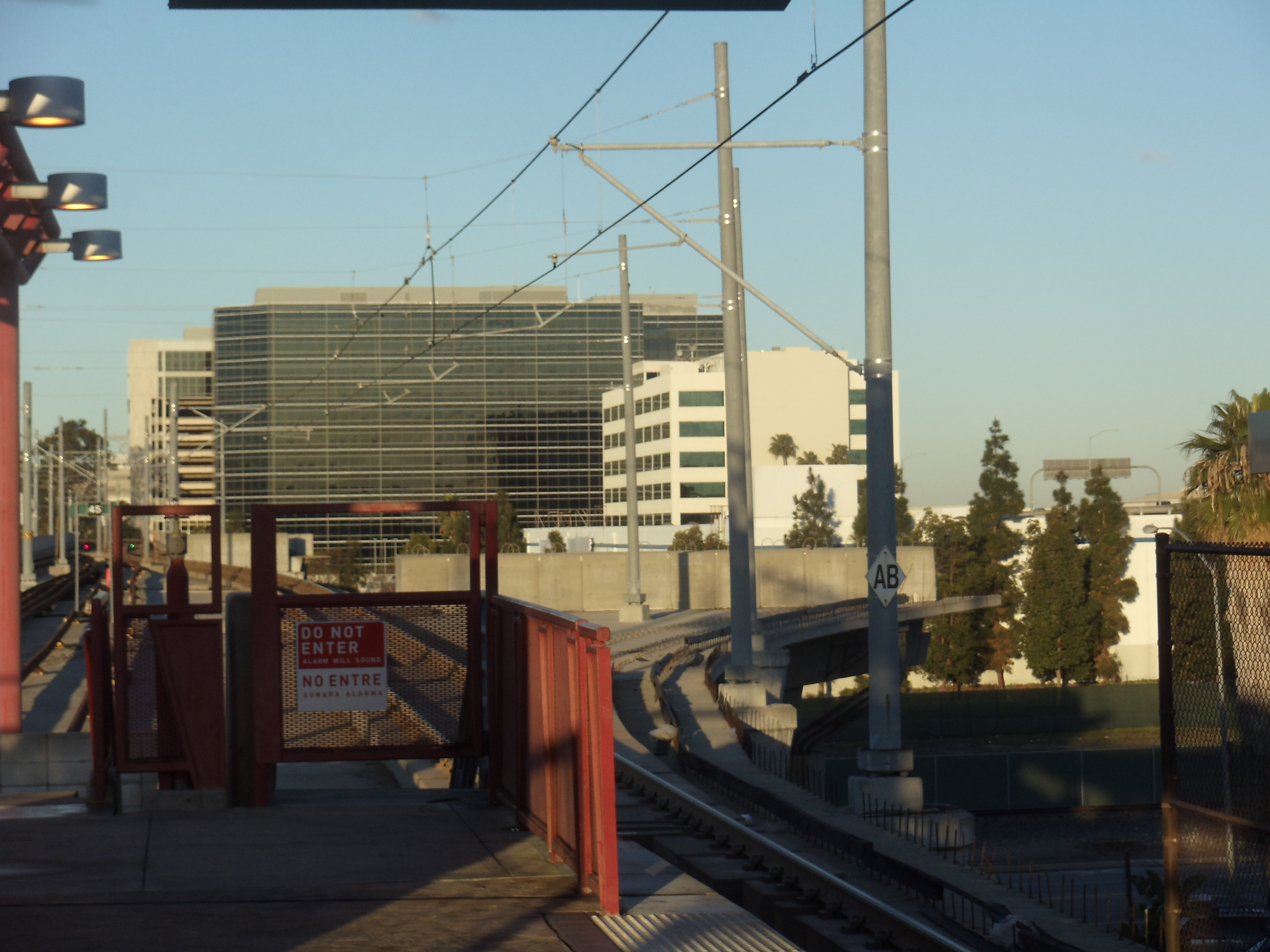
Stub ends constructed in the 1990s near Aviation/Imperial station for a future extension to LAX, now used to connect the C and K lines.

During the planning of the C Line (then known as the Green Line) in the late 1980s, Metro considered extending the line north from Aviation/Imperial station to LAX. Proposed options included direct service to terminals or a station near Lot C, with connections via a people mover. To preserve the option for a future extension, Metro constructed concrete ramps and stub tracks just west of the Aviation/Imperial station as part of the original line. However, the extension plans were canceled by 1994 following disagreements with the Federal Aviation Administration (FAA) and local officials, some of whom preferred the line to serve residential communities. Some critics also accused Los Angeles World Airports (LAWA) of opposing the extension to preserve parking revenue.

When the C Line opened in 1995, the nearest station to the airport was Aviation/Imperial, approximately 2.4 miles (3.9 km) away. A free LAX Shuttle was provided to connect passengers between the station and terminals.

In the 1990s and 2000s, planning for the north–south K Line (originally the Crenshaw/LAX Line) revived interest in an LAX rail link. The proposed alignment ran along Aviation Boulevard, near the airport, and included a wye junction from the stub at Aviation/Imperial station, allowing the C Line to eventually share K Line tracks to the north. However, the K Line did not initially include a dedicated airport station; instead, a separate project was launched in 2011 to evaluate connection options under the Airport Metro Connector (AMC) program.

An Alternatives Analysis published in 2012 considered several proposals, including a direct Metro Rail extension into the terminal area and a connection to LAWA’s proposed Automated People Mover (APM), which had been outlined in the airport's 2004 Master Plan. The study identified the APM connection (Alternative A) as the most cost-effective option with minimal disruption to through-service passengers.

In June 2014, Metro approved a modified version, Alternative A2, placing the connection at Aviation Boulevard and 96th Street—roughly half a mile north of Aviation/Century station. This plan required Metro to add a new station to the K Line design. The facility was envisioned as a multimodal hub featuring a dedicated station building, concourses, bus plaza, bike facilities, and public art.

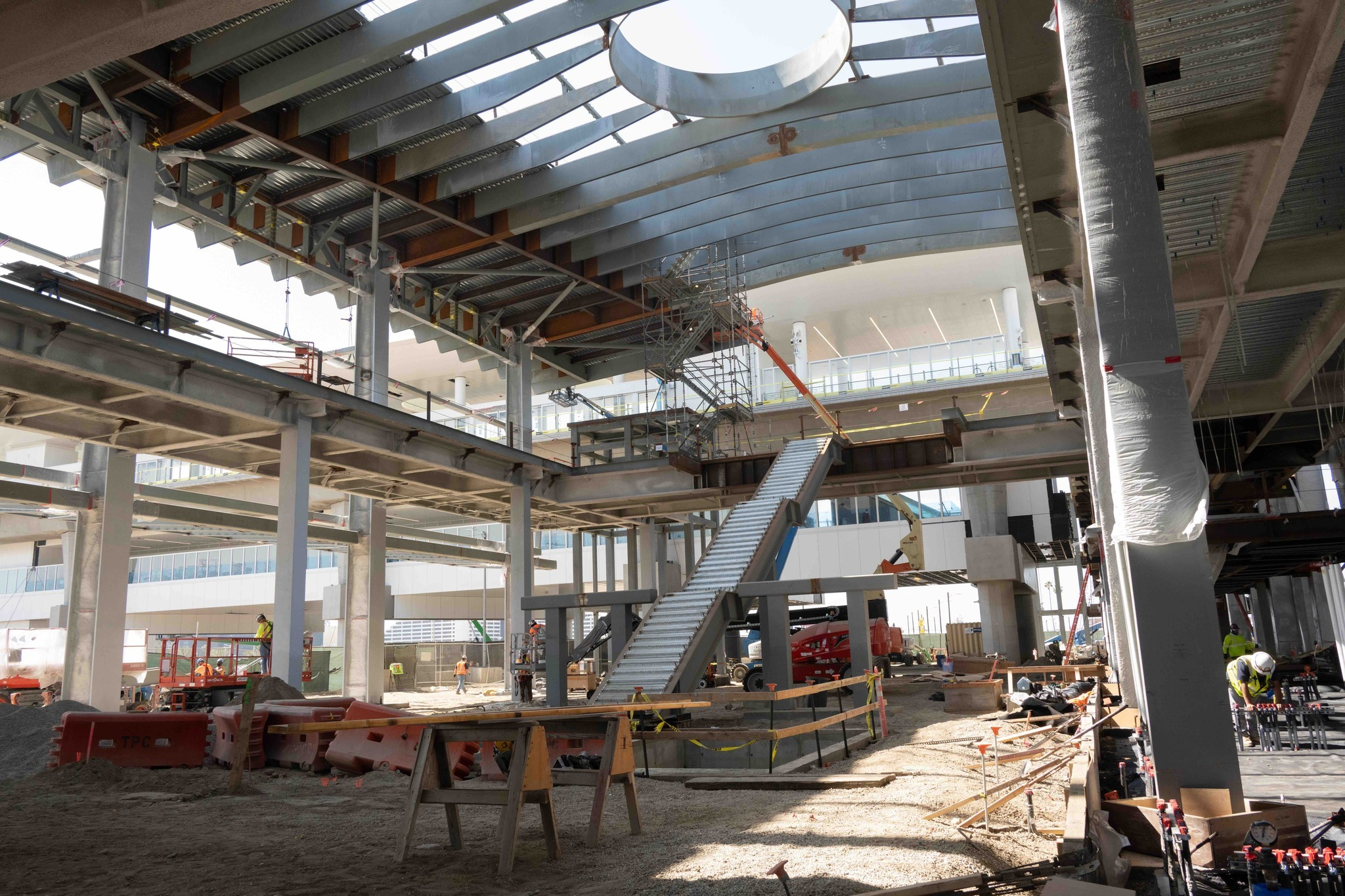
LAX/Metro Transit Center station under construction in July 2023.

The station was initially referred to as Aviation/96th Street during planning and scoping, which Metro approved later in 2014. It was officially renamed LAX/Metro Transit Center in June 2022 following public feedback. Environmental clearance was granted in 2016, and construction began in 2021.

Designed by Grimshaw Architects, the station was originally scheduled to open in late 2024 but was delayed to mid-2025. On April 24, 2025, County Supervisor Janice Hahn announced the station would open on June 6, 2025. It officially opened to the public that evening following a media and VIP ceremony.

As of 2026, the hub serves the C and K Lines, eleven bus lines, and the LAX Shuttle. A direct connection to SkyLink is expected to open when testing and certification is completed. The total construction cost of the project was estimated at $900 million.

In May 2026, Metro staff prepared a report to be presented to the Executive Management Committee at its May 21 meeting for a proposed five-year contract with Cathay Pacific for the station's naming rights.

== Service ==
=== Hours and frequency ===
C Line service hours are approximately from 4:00 a.m. until 12:30 a.m. daily. Trains operate every 10 minutes throughout the day. Night and early morning weekend service is every 20 minutes.

K Line service hours are approximately from 4:30 a.m. until 12:00 a.m. daily. Trains operate every 10 minutes throughout most of the day. Trains run every 20 minutes after 8:00 p.m. every day and before 8:00 a.m. on weekends.

=== Connections ===
As of June 6, 2025, the bus hub at the station replaced the LAX City Bus Center and Aviation/Imperial station as the major point of connection for local and regional buses, and is served by the following routes:

Operator	Route	Bay	Destination	Notes
Beach Cities Transit	109	9	Redondo Beach Pier	
Big Blue Bus (Santa Monica)	3	4/5	Santa Monica	
Culver CityBus	6	7	UCLA	
Culver CityBus	Rapid 6	7	UCLA	
GTrans (Gardena)	5	10	Willowbrook/Rosa Parks station	
Los Angeles Metro Bus	40 (owl)	12	Downtown Los Angeles	operates late night only
Los Angeles Metro Bus	102	8	South Gate	
Los Angeles Metro Bus	111	13	Norwalk	
Los Angeles Metro Bus	117	12	Downey	
Los Angeles Metro Bus	120	11	Whittier	
Los Angeles Metro Bus	232	15	Long Beach	
Los Angeles Metro Bus	SoFi Shuttle (Note: Alternatively known as the Hollywood Park Shuttle for events in nearby Hollywood Park.)	8	SoFi Stadium	operates during NFL home games and select events at SoFi Stadium
Los Angeles Metro Bus	Intuit Dome Shuttle	8	Intuit Dome	operates during NBA home games and select events at Intuit Dome
LAX Shuttle	M	1/2	Los Angeles International Airport	to be discontinued following opening of SkyLink
Metro Micro	—N/a	14	LAX/Inglewood Zone	on-demand transit service
Torrance Transit	8	6	Torrance	

LADOT Commuter Express route 574 also services the station via curbside stop at Aviation Boulevard near Arbor Vitae Street.

Following the opening of SkyLink, the station will also offer direct connections to charter and intercity bus services stationed at LAWA owned bus bays accessible from the people mover platform's eastern portal. These services include LAX's FlyAway, Antelope Valley Airport Express, Santa Barbara Airbus, Central Coast Shuttle, and Ventura County Airporter.

== Hub artwork ==
This hub features a sculpture designed by Glenn Kaino, a conceptual artist based in Los Angeles and commissioned by Metro Art. Called The Distance of the Sun, the sculpture is made up of vessels joined together, creating a spiral pathway suspended in the air. These ships symbolize the universal dreams of spaceflight and represent the importance of collaboration and imagination. The piece connects to the hub's skylight, making the ships climb to the heavens, referencing the short story The Distance of the Moon.

== Future Metro transit connections ==
Metro has proposed to make this hub the southern terminus for Phase 2 of the Sepulveda Transit Corridor. Metro is in the final EIR stage for Phase 1 of the corridor as of 2026 with completion planned for around 2040. Metro has also proposed the LAX/Metro Transit Center as the southern terminus for the Lincoln Boulevard Transit Corridor bus rapid transit line with a completion date of 2047. Both projects are funded by Measure M.
