= LAX West Intermodal Transportation Facility =

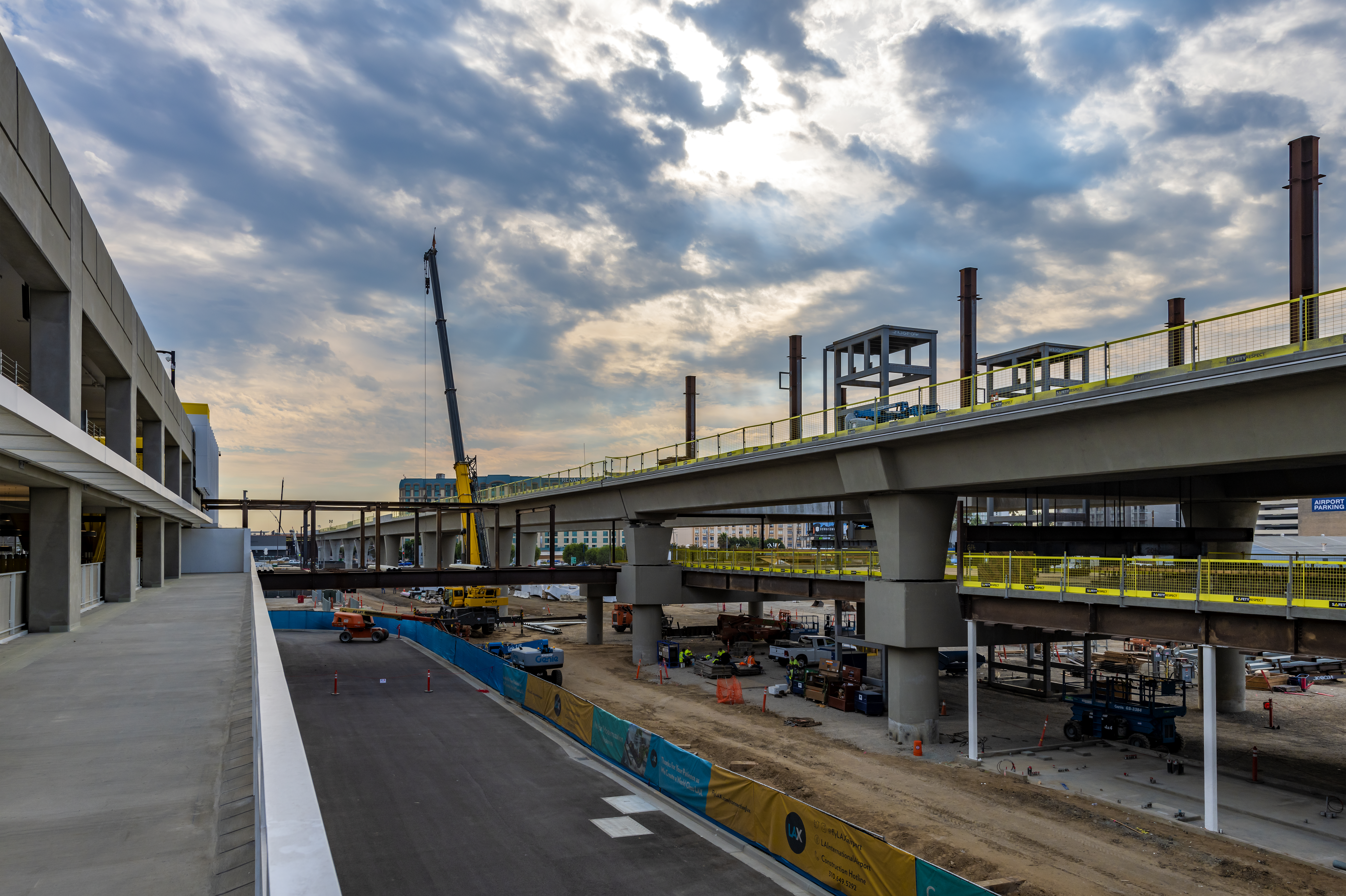
- ITF West (left) with SkyLink station under construction (right)

General information
- Location: 6111 96th Street Los Angeles, California, United States
- Coordinates: 33°56′59″N 118°23′24″W
- Groundbreaking: July 11, 2019
- Opened: October 19, 2021
- Cost: US$294.1 million
- Owner: Los Angeles World Airports

Technical details
- Material: Concrete
- Floor count: 4
- Floor area: 1,700,000 square feet (160,000 m^{2})

Design and construction
- Architecture firm: Watry Design Group; Gensler
- Main contractor: Swinerton Builders

Other information
- Parking: 4,300 spaces

The LAX West Intermodal Transportation Facility (also known as ITF West or the LAX Economy Parking facility) is a large parking structure with a park and ride area and access to nearby hotels.

The four-story, 1,700,000 square feet (160,000 m^{2}) facility cost US$294.1 million (equivalent to $349.4 million in 2025) to build and opened on October 19, 2021.

== History ==
Construction on ITF West began in summer of 2019 with a groundbreaking on July 11, 2019.

ITF West opened to the public on October 19, 2021, temporarily using buses to transport customers between the airport terminals and the facility.

In 2022, Los Angeles World Airports' Security & Badging Office moved into a 26,000-square-foot (2,400 m^{2}) space on the ground floor.

== SkyLink service ==
ITF West

General information
- Location: Los Angeles, California; United States
- System: SkyLink
- Operator: Los Angeles World Airports
- Transit authority: Los Angeles International Airport (LAX)
- Line: SkyLink
- Platforms: 1
- Tracks: 2
- Train operators: LINXS

Future services
Preceding station	LAWA	Following station
East CTA toward West CTA	SkyLink	ITF East toward RCC
Location

=== Hours and frequency ===
The APM is expected to operate 24 hours a day. During peak hours (9 a.m. to 11 p.m.) trains will arrive every two minutes.

=== West ITF Ground Transportation Center ===
{{ Economy Parking Garage, Private Hotel Shuttles, Rideshare and Taxi pick-up/drop-off, access to Airport Blvd.
