= FlyAway (bus) =

Shuttle bus serving Los Angeles International Airport

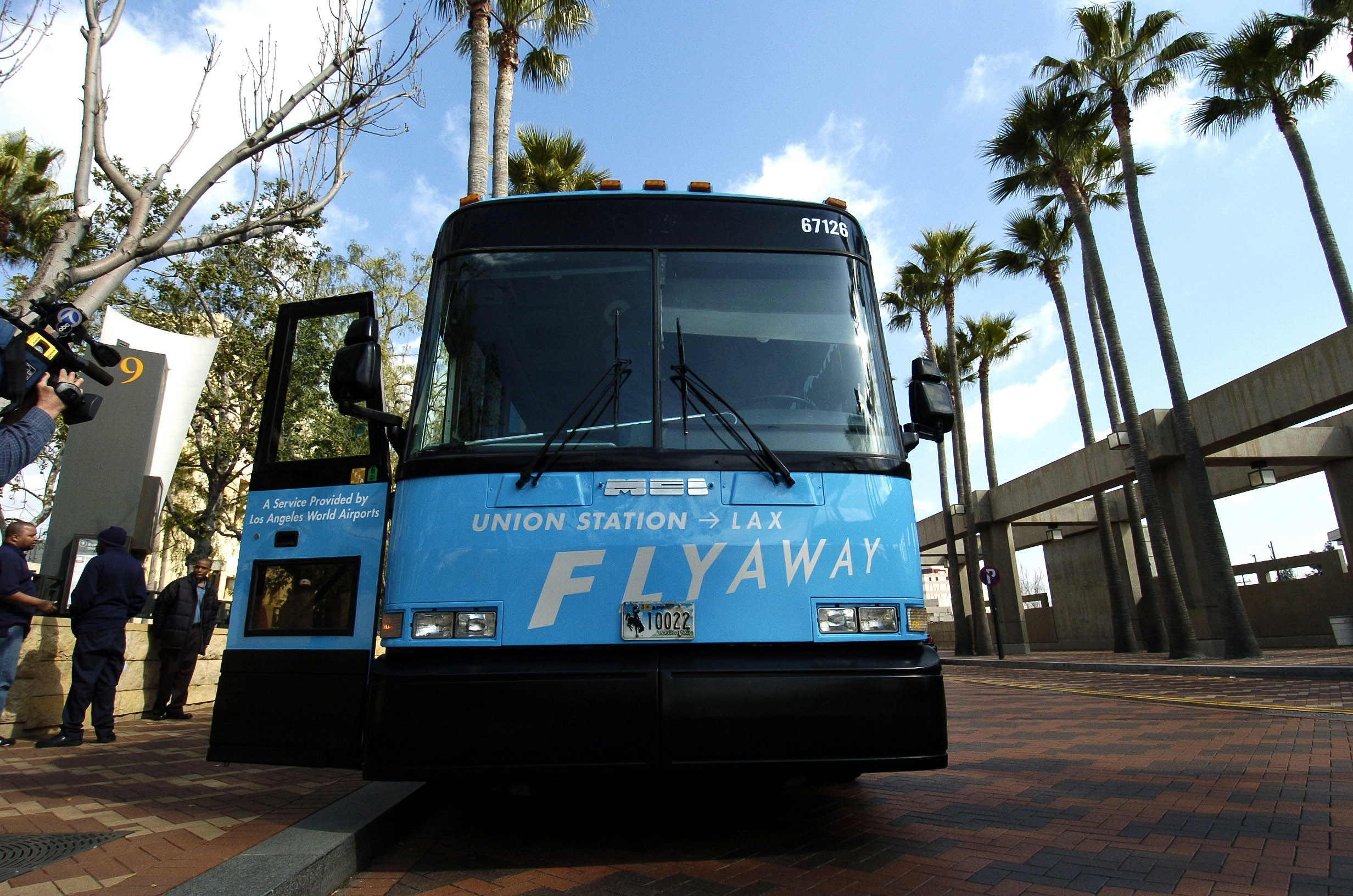
- FlyAway bus boarding passengers at Union Station, 2007
- Parent: Los Angeles World Airports
- Founded: 1975
- Locale: Los Angeles County, California
- Service type: Airport shuttle
- Routes: 2
- Annual ridership: 1.9 million (2024)
- Website: flylax.com/flyaway-bus

FlyAway is an airport shuttle service providing non-stop connections to and from Los Angeles International Airport (LAX). As of 2025, service operates between LAX and two bus terminals located near Van Nuys Airport and Los Angeles Union Station. The service is managed by Los Angeles World Airports (LAWA), which also operates LAX and Van Nuys Airport, while daily operations are contracted to third-party bus operators. FlyAway is part of LAWA's ground transportation initiative to reduce traffic congestion and vehicle emissions by promoting high-occupancy vehicle travel. In 2024, LAWA reported that the FlyAway network carried more than 1.9 million passengers, eliminating an estimated 1.45 million individual vehicle trips.

== Operations ==
Currently, FlyAway buses serve the LAX Central Terminal Area (CTA) at eight stops, covering Terminals 1 through 7 and the Tom Bradley International Terminal. When SkyLink opens, FlyAway service will be shifted out of the CTA. Instead, buses will stop at dedicated bays on a new platform under construction by LAWA near the LAX/Metro Transit Center station. The change is intended to address recurring problems, such as buses reaching capacity before serving all terminals and delays caused by CTA traffic congestion. LAWA officials expect the new arrangement to improve service reliability, reduce travel times, and provide opportunities for future growth.

FlyAway buses do not accept cash payments. Tickets can be purchased with a credit or debit card at stations or online, and fares are also payable with a TAP card. Tickets for the Union Station route are additionally available at Metrolink ticket vending machines at all train stations, including Union Station. Metrolink monthly pass holders may ride the Union Station route free of charge with a same-day airline ticket.

== Routes ==
=== Van Nuys ===
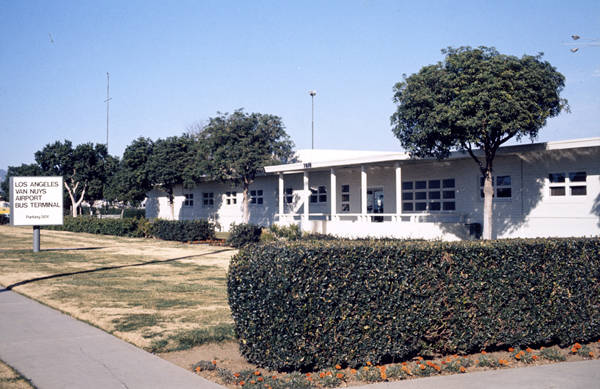
FlyAway Bus Terminal at Van Nuys Airport in 1975

The Van Nuys FlyAway provides direct service between LAX and the FlyAway terminal adjacent to the LAWA-owned Van Nuys Airport. Service operates 24 hours a day, with hourly departures between midnight and 3 am, every 30 minutes between 3 am and 5 am, and every 20 minutes from 5 am to midnight.

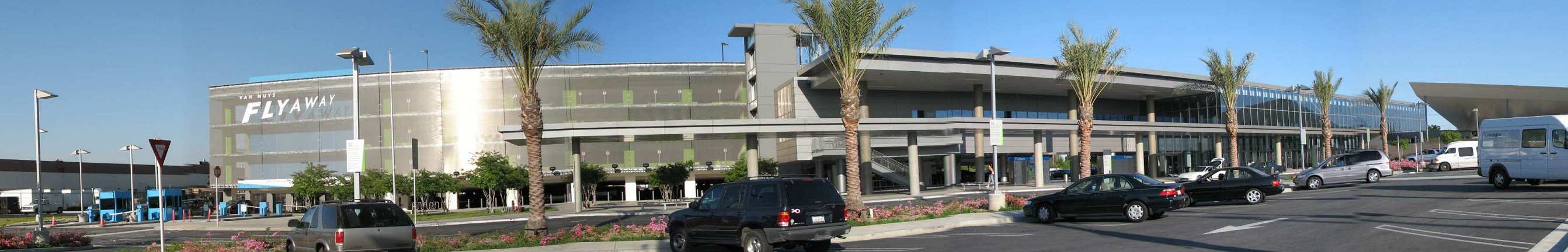
Panorama of the FlyAway Bus Terminal at Van Nuys Airport in 2006, shortly after opening

Van Nuys is the only FlyAway stop with a dedicated passenger terminal, located at 7610 Woodley Avenue. When the route opened on July 10, 1975, it was served by a small terminal building. In 2004, this was replaced with a larger US$34 million facility designed as a remote LAX terminal, including provisions for future airline ticketing and checked-baggage services. The project also added a 2,000-space parking garage, improved drop-off facilities, and new landscaping, bringing total parking capacity to 3,020 spaces.

Nearby public transit is provided by 2 Los Angeles Metro Bus routes. 169 connects Saticoy Street to Canoga station, the Warner Center Transit Hub, Van Nuys station, and Hollywood Burbank Airport, with stops at both the North and South stations and the Regional Intermodal Transportation Center, linking to Amtrak, the Metro G Line, and Metrolink. 237 connects Woodley Avenue to the Metro G Line and the Metro B Line, with stops at the Woodley Station, the Van Nuys Station, the Valley College Station, and the North Hollywood Station.

Van Nuys was the original FlyAway route and the only one for more than 30 years. In its first year it carried over 275,000 passengers, growing to nearly 988,000 annually by 2008.

The Van Nuys route is one of the few FlyAway services that operates at a profit, with fare and parking revenue covering operating costs. In 2013, LAWA projected a net operating profit of about $168,000.

=== Union Station ===
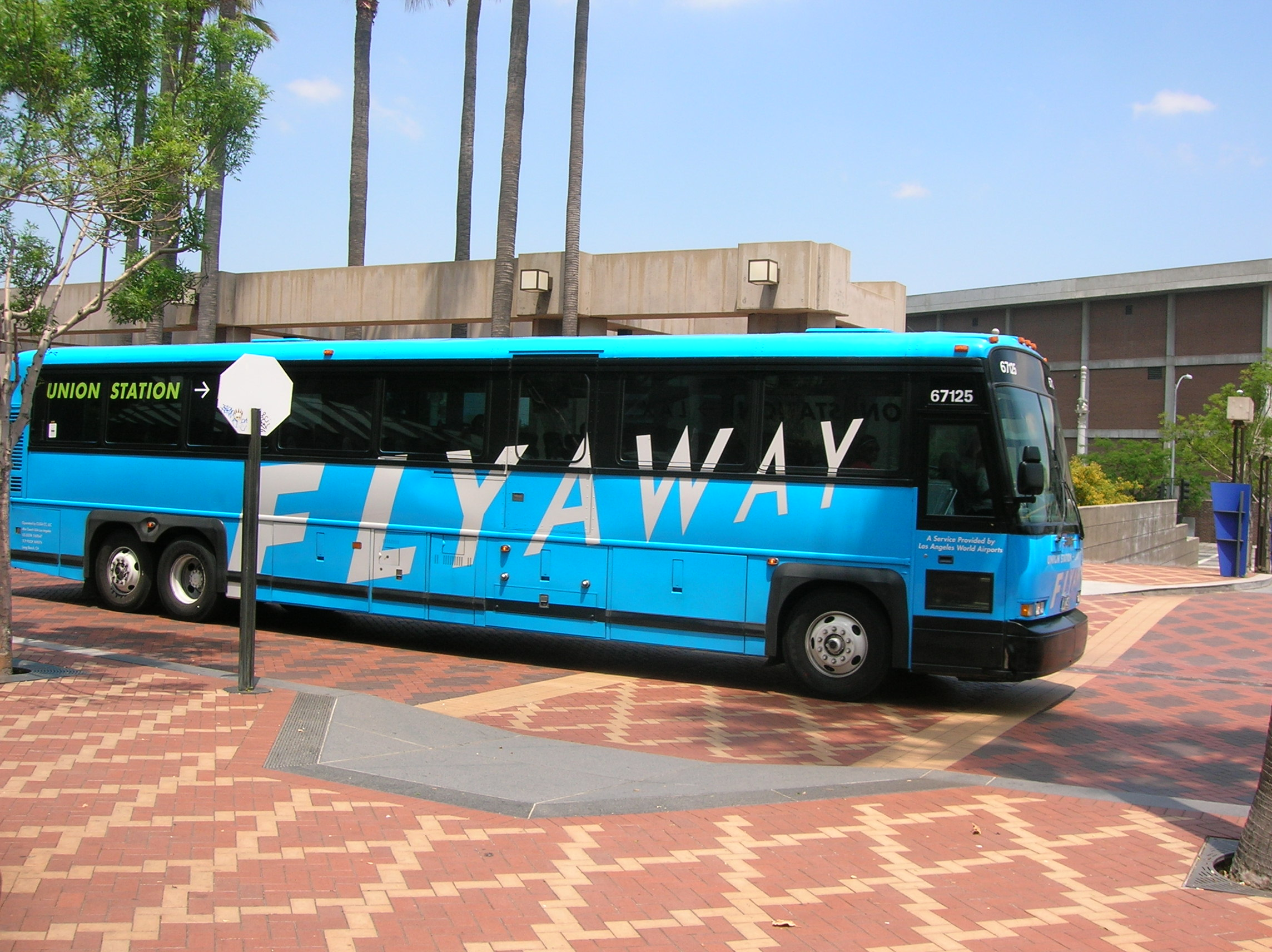
FlyAway bus at Union Station, 2006

The Union Station FlyAway connects LAX with the Patsaouras Transit Plaza on the east side of Union Station in downtown Los Angeles. It is intended to serve passengers arriving by public transportation, though parking is available in a garage on Vignes Street at higher rates than at Van Nuys.

The service operates 24 hours a day, with buses running every 30 minutes for most of the day, every 20 minutes during peak hours, and hourly late at night. Buses depart from Bay 1 at the Patsaouras Transit Plaza and use the high-occupancy toll (HOT) lanes on the Harbor Freeway (I-110) and the high-occupancy vehicle (HOV) lanes on the Century Freeway (I-105). Tickets may be purchased from the staffed FlyAway kiosk at the plaza or from any Metrolink ticket vending machine.

The Union Station FlyAway began service on March 15, 2006, becoming the second FlyAway location. It was hailed as a success by city officials, carrying 250,000 passengers in its first year—more than three times the original forecast. By 2008, annual ridership had risen to over 433,000.

== Former routes ==
=== Westwood ===
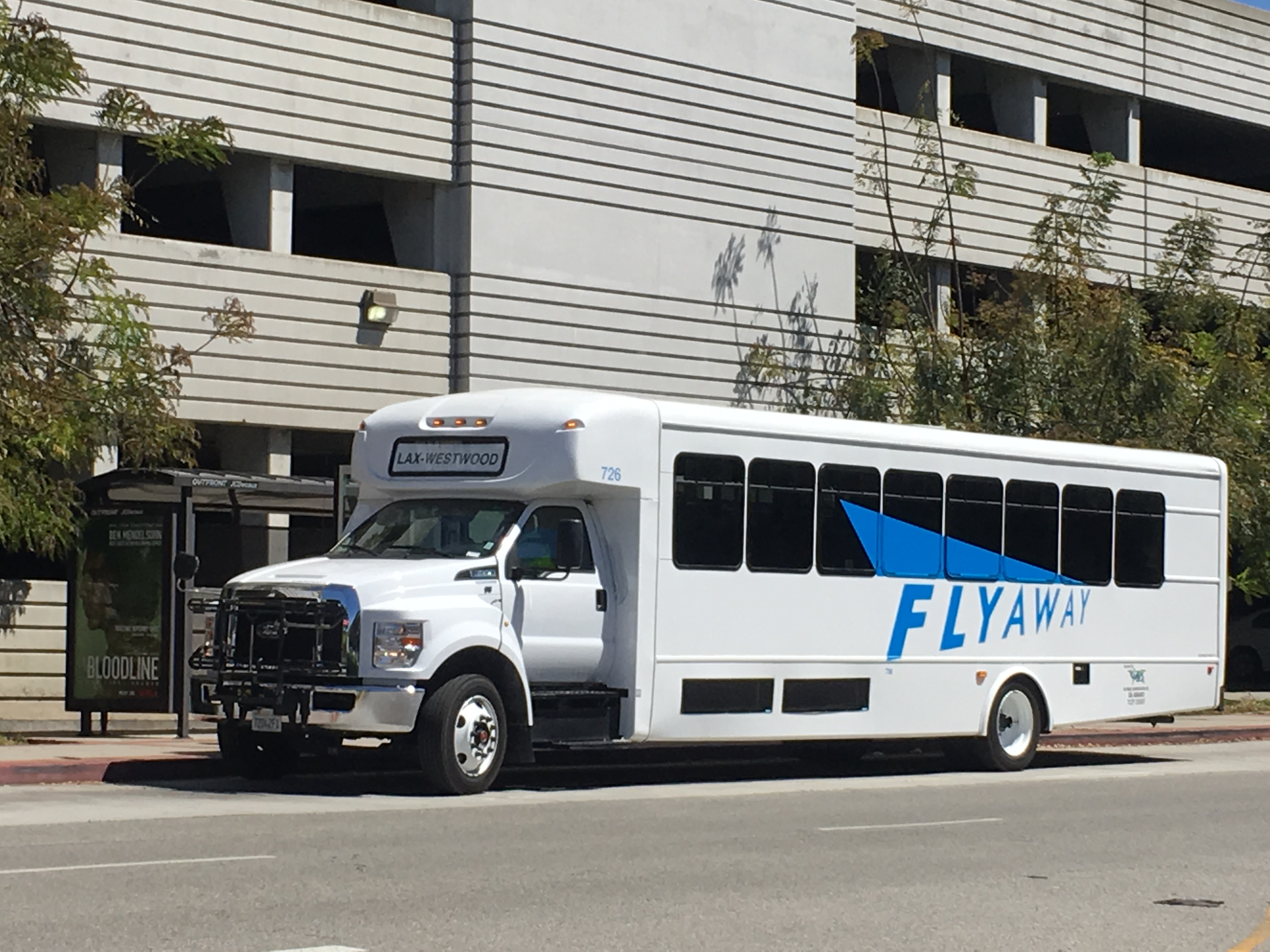
Westwood FlyAway bus stopped at UCLA Parking Structure 32.

The Westwood FlyAway route operated between LAX and Parking Structure 32 near the UCLA campus in Westwood. Service began on June 14, 2007, as the third FlyAway route, and was operated with compressed natural gas (CNG) buses beginning in 2008. In its first year, the Westwood FlyAway carried about 105,000 passengers, rising to 125,000 in 2008. Despite this, ridership remained relatively low compared to other routes, and the service was discontinued on July 1, 2019, due to low demand, high parking fees, and competition from ride-hailing services.

=== Irvine ===
The Irvine FlyAway operated from the Irvine Transportation Center, beginning November 16, 2009. It offered limited service—six trips per day with fares of $25. Passengers had access to free long-term parking. Following the Chapter 11 bankruptcy of operator Coach America, the route was discontinued on August 31, 2012.

=== Expo/La Brea ===
The Expo/La Brea FlyAway ran between Expo/La Brea station on the Metro Expo Line and LAX. Service began July 1, 2013, with lower fares than other routes, but was discontinued on September 2, 2014, replaced by the Hollywood FlyAway route.

=== Santa Monica ===
The Santa Monica FlyAway linked LAX with Santa Monica Place beginning July 15, 2014. Intended to serve local residents and connect with the Big Blue Bus and Expo Line, it lacked dedicated parking and faced competition from existing Big Blue Bus route 3 to LAX. The service ended September 5, 2016.

=== Hollywood ===
The Hollywood FlyAway connected LAX with a stop on Vine Street near the Hollywood/Vine station on the Metro B Line. Buses also made a stop at the Expo/La Brea station on the E Line, replacing the former Expo/La Brea route. Service began September 3, 2014, and was intended to serve Metro riders and local residents. The route was criticized for reliability issues, with more than 75 complaints logged in its first months of operation. The service was suspended March 28, 2020, and has not resumed.

=== Orange Line ===
Beginning December 7, 2015, select Van Nuys FlyAway trips stopped at Woodley station on the Metro Orange Line (now G Line). The stop was discontinued January 31, 2019, due to low ridership.

=== Long Beach ===
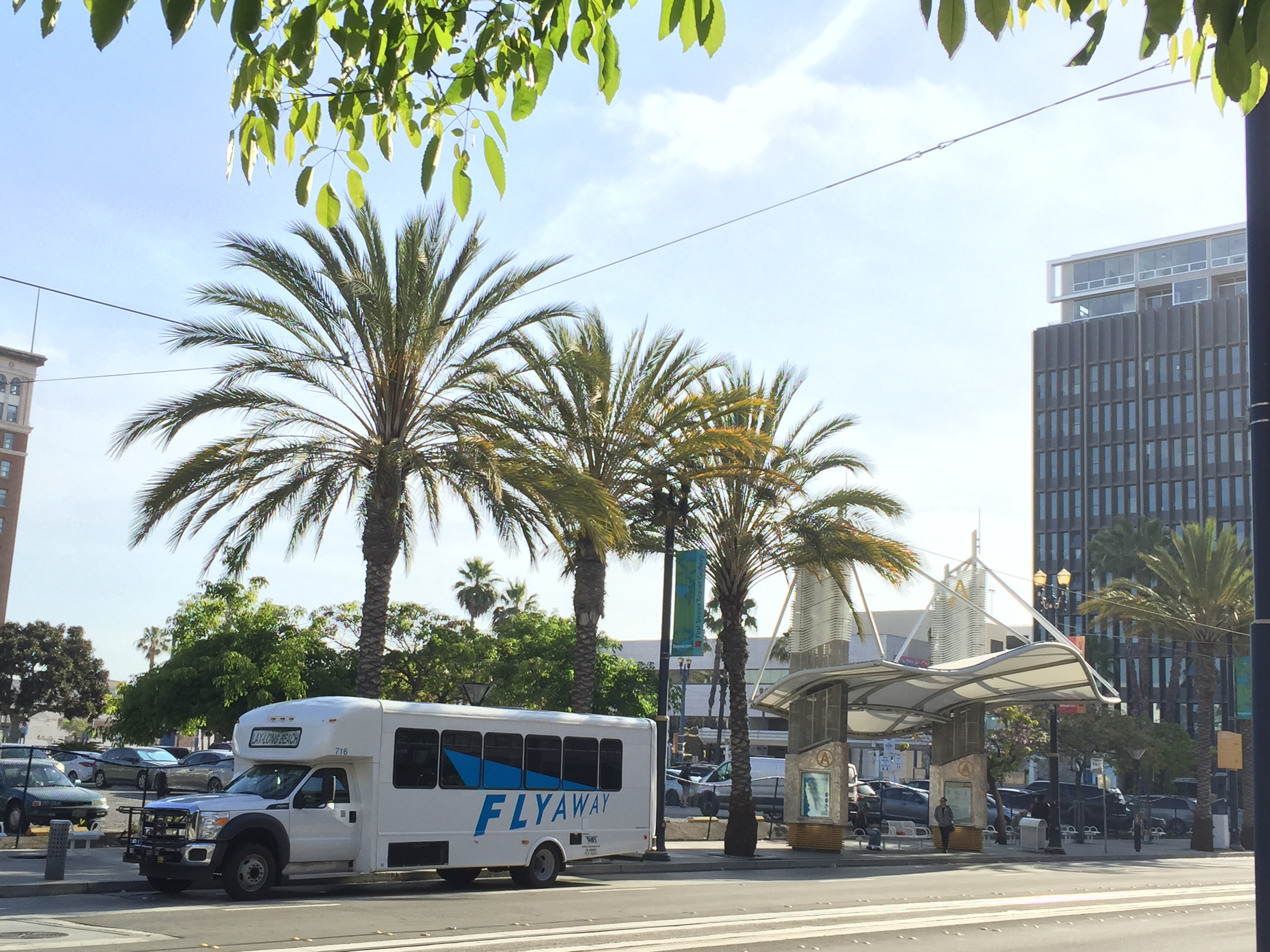
Long Beach FlyAway Bus at Long Beach Transit Shelter A

The Long Beach FlyAway operated between LAX and Shelter A at the Long Beach Transit Gallery, near the Downtown Long Beach station on the Metro A Line. Service began December 30, 2015. The service was suspended March 28, 2020, and has not resumed.
