= LAX Rental Car Center =

Consolidated rental car facility for Los Angeles International Airport

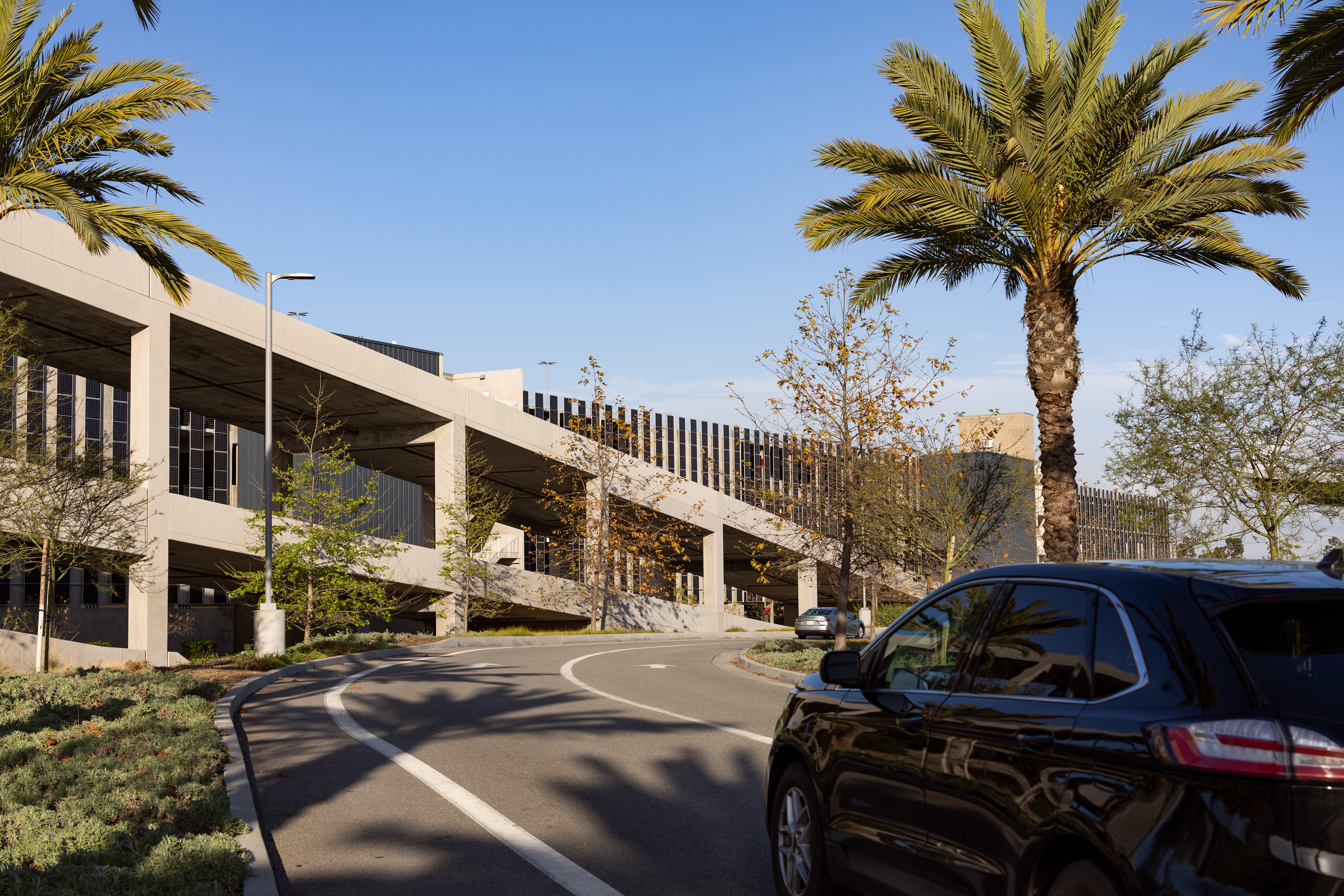
- Facility in early 2026
- Interactive map of the LAX Rental Car Center area

General information
- Location: 5251 West 98th Street, Los Angeles, California, United States
- Coordinates: 33°57′00″N 118°22′30″W
- Groundbreaking: September 12, 2019
- Topped-out: July 12, 2021
- Opened: October 9, 2024 (partial); March 11, 2026 (full)
- Cost: US$1 billion
- Owner: Los Angeles World Airports

Technical details
- Material: Concrete
- Floor count: 5
- Floor area: 5,719,000 sq ft (531,300 m^{2})

Design and construction
- Architecture firm: PGAL; AC Martin Partners
- Main contractor: PCL Construction
- Designations: LEED Gold
- Known for: 2nd largest concrete building in the United States

Other information
- Parking: 21,000 rental vehicles
Preceding station	LAWA	Following station
ITF East toward West CTA	SkyLink	Terminus

The LAX Rental Car Center (RCC) is a consolidated rental car facility for Los Angeles International Airport (LAX). The first companies began operating out of the facility in October 2024. On March 11, 2026 it was declared fully operational, albeit without SkyLink, consolidating rental car operations previously spread across the surrounding area of LAX into one location adjacent to the 405 freeway. The facility can store up to 21,000 rental vehicles.

== History ==
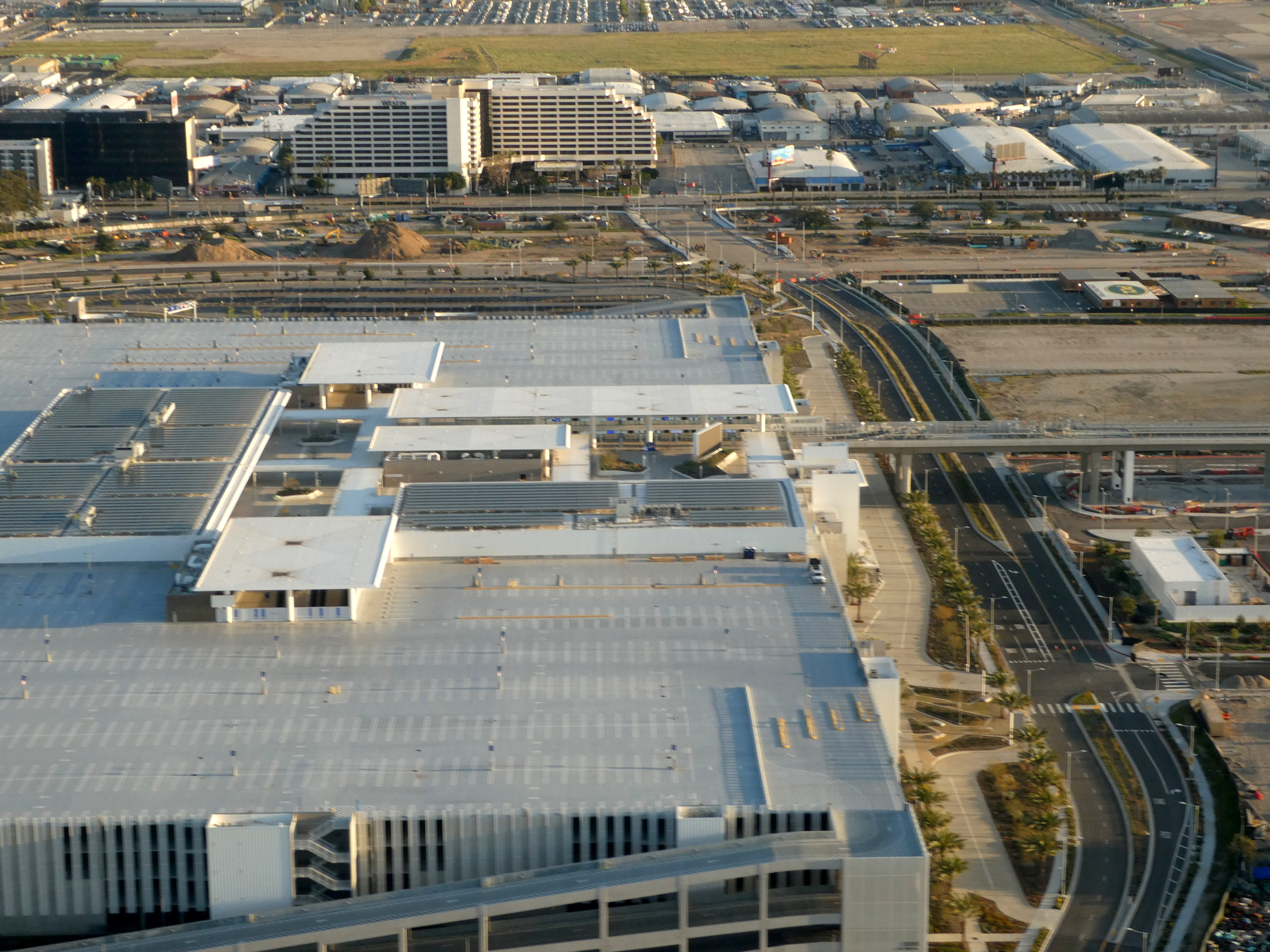
The RCC under construction in 2024

Known as the LAX Consolidated Rent-A-Car Facility (ConRAC) during development, the LAX Rental Car Center is one of the major components of the airport's US$5.5 billion Landside Access Modernization Program, along with SkyLink. The $1 billion facility consolidates rental car operations previously spread across the Westchester neighborhood of Los Angeles. Before the construction of the RCC, these rental car companies operated 3,200 daily shuttle trips around the Central Terminal Area and on streets around LAX.

The facility was built by a public–private partnership known as LAX ConRAC Partners, a consortium of 11 companies led by PCL Construction. Los Angeles World Airports (LAWA), the operator of LAX, awarded the consortium a $2 billion contract, with the construction and operations phases of the facility each costing about $1 billion.

A ceremonial groundbreaking was held on September 12, 2019. The 5,719,000 sq ft (531,300 m^{2}) facility will be the largest rental car facility in the world when it opens. The facility was topped out July 12, 2021. The project used a total of 233,000 cubic yards (178,000 m^{3}) of concrete, which at the time made it the second-largest concrete building in the United States, behind the Pentagon. The RCC facility has been designed to achieve a LEED Gold rating with sustainable elements including native drought-tolerant landscaping, reclaimed water usage and a solar farm generating approximately 8,400 megawatt hours annually.

The focal point of the RCC is the five-story ready/return building, at which customers pick up and return vehicles. This building also includes a station on SkyLink. There is also a quick turnaround (QTA) building used for the light maintenance of vehicles such as fuelling, car washing, oil changes and tire rotation. By keeping operations within the footprint of the facility, the QTA building will help in minimizing traffic congestion on the roads.

In 2018, LAWA signed 20-year base leases with rental car companies to use the RCC. The ready/return building was handed over to tenants on June 6, 2022 for contractors for the car rental companies to construct their rental counters, waiting areas, office spaces and entry/exit booths.

The Avis Budget Group was the first to begin operations at the facility on October 9, 2024. The facility's opening was officially announced on March 11, 2026 with Enterprise Holdings, Europcar, The Hertz Corporation, and Sixt having relocated their operations to the building.

== Operations ==
The facility hosts five rental car companies representing 13 brands, including Avis Budget Group (which operates Avis Car Rental, Budget Rent a Car, Payless Car Rental and Zipcar), Enterprise Holdings (which operates Enterprise Rent-A-Car, Alamo Rent a Car and National Car Rental), Europcar (which operates Europcar and Fox Rent A Car), The Hertz Corporation (which operates Hertz Rent A Car, Dollar Rent A Car and Thrifty Car Rental), and Sixt.

It is planned that smaller "off-airport" rental car companies who choose not to relocate will pick up their customers curbside on the west side of the RCC facility. However, as of March 2026, they pick up their customers curbside at the LAX West Intermodal Transportation Facility (economy parking garage).

=== People Mover hours and frequency ===
When it opens, the APM "G" station is expected to operate 24 hours a day. During peak hours (9 a.m. to 11 p.m.) trains will arrive every two minutes. From the RCC, it will take 10 minutes to reach the West Central Terminal Area (CTA) station.
