= Hangar One (Los Angeles, California) =

- U.S. National Register of Historic Places
- Los Angeles Historic-Cultural Monument
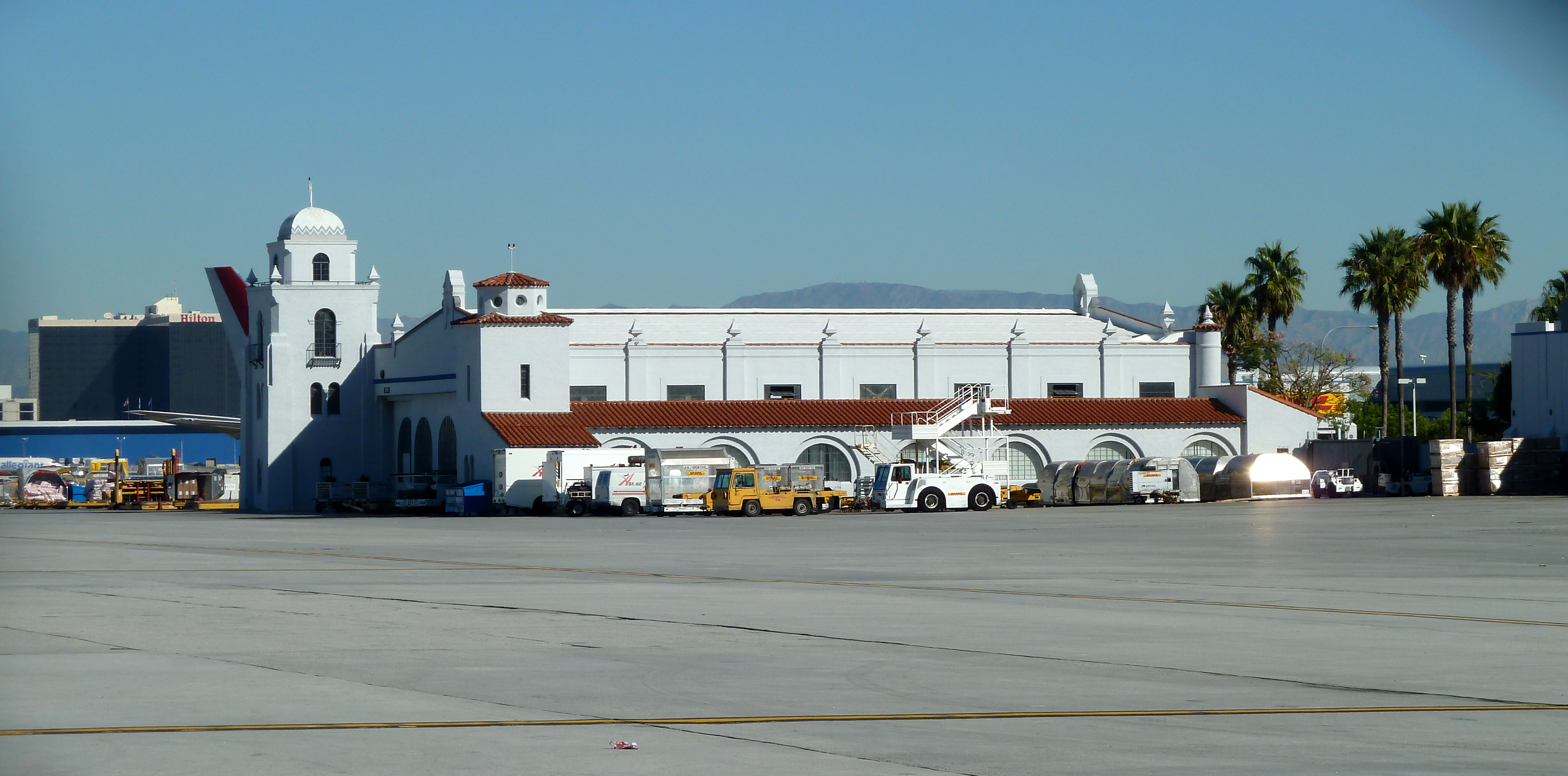

- Location within the Los Angeles metropolitan area Location within California Location within the United States
- Location: 5701 W. Imperial Hwy., Los Angeles, California
- Coordinates: 33°56′1″N 118°23′4″W
- Area: Los Angeles International Airport (LAX)
- Built: 1929
- Architect: Gable & Wyant
- Architectural style: Mission/Spanish Revival
- NRHP reference No.: 92000959
- LAHCM No.: 44

Significant dates
- Added to NRHP: July 30, 1992
- Designated LAHCM: November 16, 1966

Hangar One, commonly referred to as Hangar No. 1, is an airplane hangar located on the grounds of Los Angeles International Airport (LAX) in Los Angeles, California. It was listed on the National Register of Historic Places in 1992.

== History ==
Hangar No. 1 was built in 1929 and was the first structure built on what was then known as Mines Field. At the time, the airport consisted of a dirt landing strip in the middle of bean and barley fields. The building was constructed by the city for $35,000, and leased to the Curtiss Wright Flying Service. The airport opened in 1930 as the Los Angeles Municipal Airport, and was purchased by the city in 1937 and renamed the Los Angeles Airport. During this period the hangar was used by Charles Lindbergh and the German LZ 127 Graf Zeppelin was tied down near its doors during its stop in Los Angeles. In 1933 and 1936, tens of thousands of spectators lined up near Hangar No. 1 to watch the National Air Races. Commercial passenger air service did not begin at the airport until December 5, 1946.

The building was declared a Los Angeles Historic-Cultural Monument No. 44 by the city's Historical Heritage Board on November 16, 1966. However, the building fell out of use in the 1970s and sat vacant. It was marked for demolition in the early 1980s to make way for airport expansion, however a group with interests in architecture and aviation stepped in and persuaded airport officials to save the building.

In 1990, a $2 million renovation brought it up to modern earthquake codes and restored its 1930s appearance. As a condition of renovation, the developer, Texas-based AVIA Development Group, earned permission to develop two new cargo buildings nearby. AVIA also made the application to the National Register of Historic Places, partly in order to gain $400,000 in tax credits.

It currently serves as a cargo building for the Aviation Facilities Company.

== Architecture and specifications ==
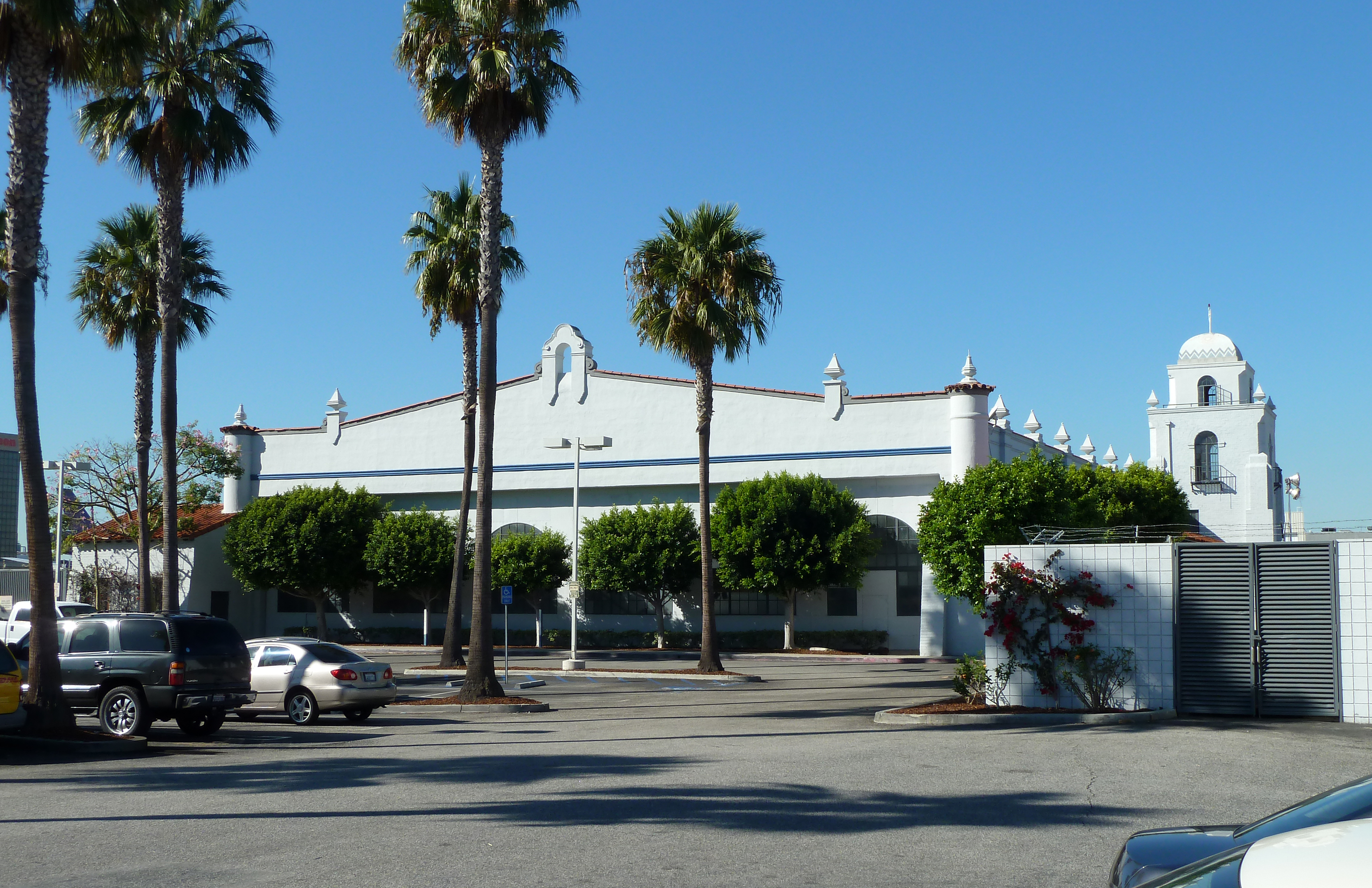
Street side view; the lower half of the wall facing the viewer were originally used as aprondoors.

The two-story brick and concrete building was one of five designed in the Spanish Colonial Revival style, and is the only remaining structure. The hangar is noted for its architecture, especially its elaborate towers, tile roofs and arches. The designers' intent was likely to promote the new airport. The building is 17,037 square feet (1,582.8 m^{2}), currently divided into 10,497 sq ft (975.2 m^{2}) of cargo handling space and 6,540 sq ft (608 m^{2}) of office space. The bay is 99 feet (30 m) in width by 114 feet (35 m) in length and is 20 to 24 feet (6.1–7.3 m) in height. It has two apron-side doors with a 26-by-18-foot (7.9 m × 5.5 m) door width and height.
