= SkyLink (Los Angeles International Airport) =

Future automated people mover at the Los Angeles International Airport

- SkyLink vehicle during testing in 2026

Overview
- Status: In testing, in litigation
- Owner: Los Angeles World Airports (LAWA)
- Locale: Los Angeles International Airport (LAX)
- Termini: West Central Terminal Area; Rental Car Center
- Stations: 6
- Website: lawa.org

Service
- Type: Automated people mover
- Operator: LAX Integrated Express Solutions (LINXS)
- Rolling stock: Alstom Innovia APM 300

Technical
- Line length: 2.25 mi (3.62 km)
- Num of tracks: 2
- Character: Fully elevated
- Operating speed: 13.5 mph (21.7 km/h) (avg.); 47 mph (75 km/h) (top)

SkyLink is an automated people mover system currently in testing to serve Los Angeles International Airport (LAX). The 2.25-mile (3.62 km) line will include six stations linking the LAX Rental Car Center, the Metro Rail system, and the LAX West Intermodal Transportation Facility (West ITF) with the airport’s central terminal area. The system will be owned by Los Angeles World Airports (LAWA). LAX Integrated Express Solutions (LINXS)—a joint venture of ACS, Alstom, Balfour Beatty, Flatiron Dragados, Fluor, HDR and Hochtief—was awarded a 25-year contract to design, build, finance, operate, and maintain the line.

Construction was initially scheduled for completion in 2023, but the opening has been repeatedly delayed, and LAWA has not announced a firm opening date. On November 9, 2026, Fitch Ratings cited the "near certainty that LINXS will be unable to achieve Passenger Service Availability (PSA) on or before the Dec. 8, 2026 long-stop date under both the construction and financing documents." The Los Angeles City Council stepped in on June 26, 2026, referring the issue to the Trade, Travel, and Tourism Committee. The project is the subject of litigation as of July 9, 2026, as testing continues (see § Litigation). On September 20, 2026, the lender longstop date was aligned with the project longstop date of December 8, 2026, a two-month delay.

A contract arbitrator previously found LAWA responsible for nearly two years of delay, and a Los Angeles County Civil Grand Jury report concluded that the project’s setbacks stemmed from a strained relationship between LAWA and the LINXS consortium, political pressure to finish the system before major regional events, and shortcomings in the contract’s dispute-resolution provisions. In total, LAWA has agreed to more than US$880 million in dispute-related payments, in addition to the project’s US$4.9 billion, 25-year cost.

== Opening ==
The official announcement gives no date: "SkyLink is not open to travelers yet. The system is in its final testing and certification phase. Opening information will be posted on this page." Regarding the transition to public use, officials noted that the timeline depends on safety results: "This first phase of testing will take approximately 60 days, at which point then we'll be able to put volunteers on the train to test what it would be like with passengers. And then once that phase is complete and all of the regulatory agencies have signed off, we'll be able to be fully operational," quoting Vanessa Rodriguez, LAWA spokesperson, at the beginning of system demonstration testing which has restarted multiple times since April 2026.

According to the California Public Utilities Commission (CPUC), after System Demonstration, LAWA "plans an additional six weeks of testing without passengers before beginning public service." LAWA's planned testing phase with community member volunteers is to help test the system and wayfinding signage. "CPUC staff will complete review and approval of the Safety Certification Verification report when safety critical items are addressed and within 21 days of submittal." A CPUC Featured Story of October 28, 2026 does not mention how the CPUC is responding to the September arc flash incidents.

The CPUC reported on October 28, 2026 that LAWA Safety and Security Review Committee (SSRC) meetings were cancelled throughout most of Q3 due to LAWA not receiving additional Safety Certification documentation from LINXS that requires CPUC review. The LA Times reported on November 12, 2026 that "meetings between chief executives for the contractor, airport officials and others that began last year stopped in August."

With officials currently ducking questions about delays, reporters have looked to shuttle-bus driver layoff notices for clues. Amendment 2 of the shuttle contract is a 9-month extension ending October 31, 2026. The August 2026 layoff notices have reportedly been rescinded, although the details and duration of any further shuttle contract extension have not been announced.

=== Potential Descoping and Deviation Request ===
LAWA and LINXS are reportedly negotiating removal of certain roadblocks to opening, by descoping remaining landscaping and roadways work (LAWA Directive Letter 161 of June 16, 2026); descoping the commissioning and operation of the Solar Photovoltaic System at the Maintenance and Storage Facility as a prerequisite to PSA (which requires a Utility Customer and Solar Interconnection Agreement); and by using a Deviation Request to modify the APM Operating Schedule for the first 6 months of service, based on LAWA's new passenger demand information, which would allow System Demonstration to proceed with the revised Operating Schedule. LAWA's reply dated October 26, 2026 clarifies their position on these and other issues.

The current shuttle contract envisions a 30 to 60-day transition period when the APM and shuttles would operate concurrently, so operating the APM on a somewhat reduced schedule for a somewhat longer transition period may be an acceptable way to accelerate opening.

== Service description ==
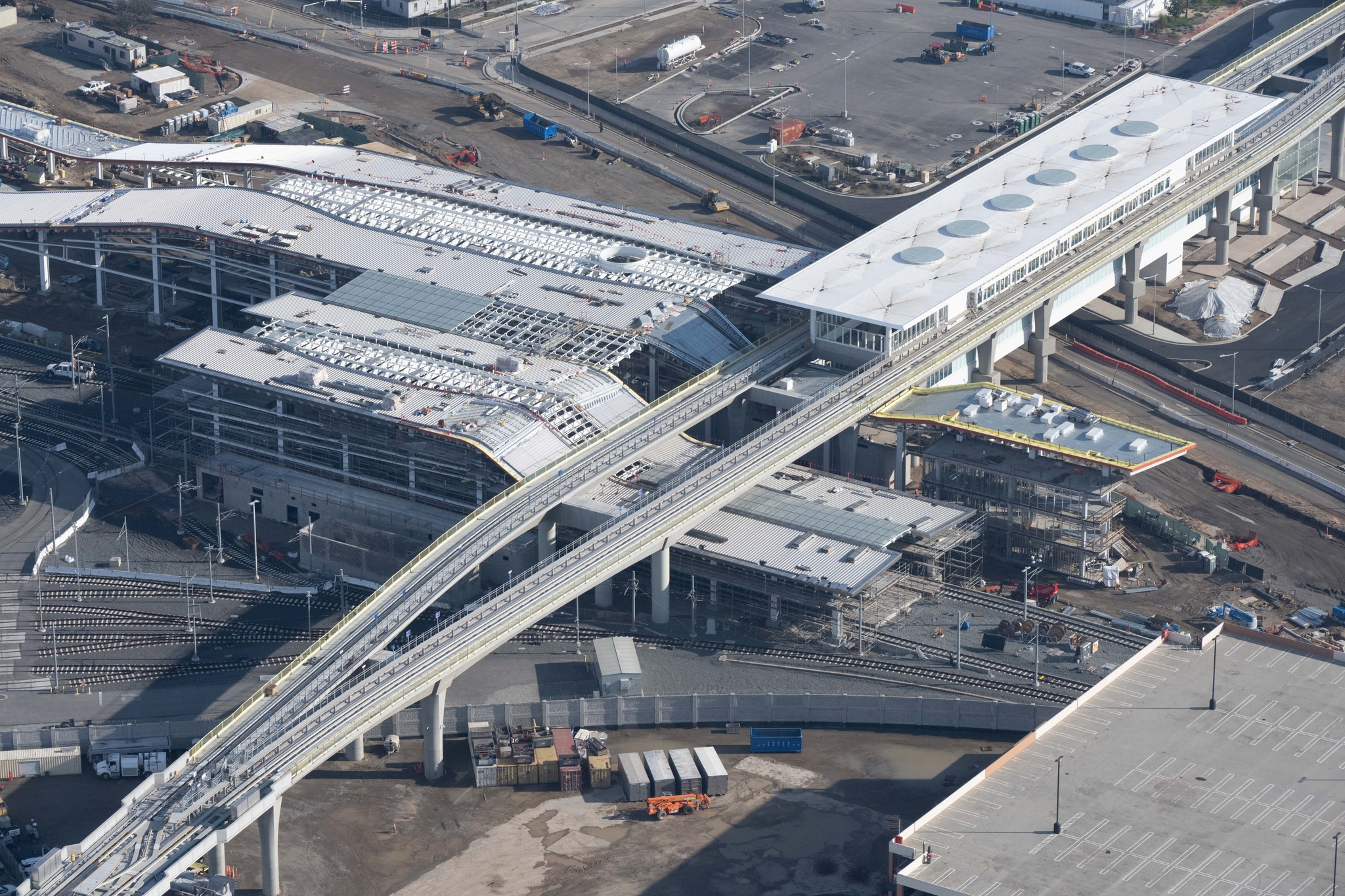
SkyLink guideway and the LAX/Metro Transit Center under construction in January 2024

=== Route description ===
SkyLink will run 2.25 miles (3.62 km) along a line of six stations, with parallel tracks forming a pinched loop.

SkyLink will serve three stations in the central terminal area (CTA) each with footbridges with moving walkways to nearby terminals. The west station will serve terminals 3, 4, and B (the Tom Bradley International Terminal), the center station will serve terminals 1, 2, 5, and 6, and the east station will serve terminals 7 and 8 with a future connection to terminal 1. Continuing to the east, the line will travel over Sepulveda Boulevard and skirt along the airfield where Terminal 9 is planned.

At that point, the line turns to the north, crossing Century Boulevard to reach the LAX West Intermodal Transportation Facility (ITF), a large parking structure with a park-and-ride area, and access to nearby hotels.

From there, the route continues east along 96th Street, passing the line's maintenance yard, crossing over the Metro Rail tracks as it arrives at the East ITF station atop the LAX/Metro Transit Center. This station will offer connections to the Los Angeles Metro Rail system and local buses.

Trains then travel a short distance to the east and enter the LAX Rental Car Center (RCC), a massive parking structure that will house all major rental car companies operating at LAX.

=== Hours and frequency ===
SkyLink is expected to operate 24 hours a day. During peak hours (9 a.m. to 11 p.m.), trains will arrive every two minutes. During off-peak hours (11 p.m. to 9 a.m.), trains will arrive every three to five minutes. The line will have a 10-minute end-to-end travel time.

=== Rolling stock ===
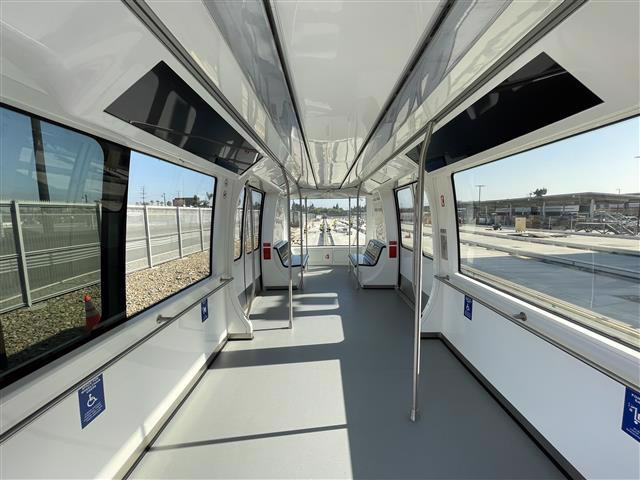
Interior of a SkyLink vehicle

The SkyLink fleet will consist of 44 Innovia APM 300 vehicles manufactured by Alstom (initially Bombardier Transportation). Each vehicle can accommodate up to 50 passengers and their luggage, with 12 seated and the rest standing. During peak periods, nine four-car trains will operate simultaneously. Trains will operate with a top speed of 47 miles per hour (76 km/h) and an average speed, including stops, of 13.5 miles per hour (21.7 km/h).

Each four-car train can accommodate up to 200 passengers. During peak hours, with a headway of every two minutes, up to 30 trains per hour are expected to enter LAX, carrying up to 6,000 passengers per hour per direction and up to 84,000 daily peak-hour passengers, or up to 30.7 million annual peak-hour passengers. The opposite direction capacity will be the same, enabling the system to theoretically transport up to 85 million passengers annually in both directions, including up to 23.7 million non-peak passengers.

=== Station listing ===
The following is the complete list of stations, from west to east.

Station		Connections and notes
A	West CTA	Terminals: 3, 4, B, Parking Garages: P3, P4
B	Center CTA	Terminals: 1, 2, 5, 6, Parking Garages: P2a, P2b, P5, P6
C	East CTA	Terminals: 7, 8, Parking Garages: P1, P7, Theme Building, Bob Hope USO, Future connection to Terminal 1
D	Terminal 9	Future infill station
E	Ground Transport Center	Economy parking garage, hotel shuttles, rideshare and taxi pick-up/drop-off, access to Airport Blvd
F	Transit Center	LAX/Metro Transit Center, private vehicle pick-up/drop-off, LAX FlyAway, charter buses, access to Aviation Blvd, future economy parking garage
G	Rental Car Center	LAX Rental Car Center, shuttles to off-airport rental car companies

=== Architecture ===
The six SkyLink stations each feature a line of 20-foot diameter circular skylights, with an additional one in the mezzanine of the LAX/Metro Transit Center. The West ITF parking garage also features similar circular lighting fixtures. The new pedestrian walkways employ a Vierendeel truss, featuring rectangular rather than triangular bracing. The old-style pedestrian walkways with triangular bracing still service parking lots P1, P4, P5, and P7. The SkyLink concrete guideway features "gentle sweeping curves and clean uniform look". Each station features a single island platform, with level boarding, which serves trains in both directions. The proposed Terminal 9 infill station is the exception, with a pair of separate side platforms serving both directions.

The East CTA station features a viewing platform for the Theme Building (see Gallery).

== History ==
=== Background ===
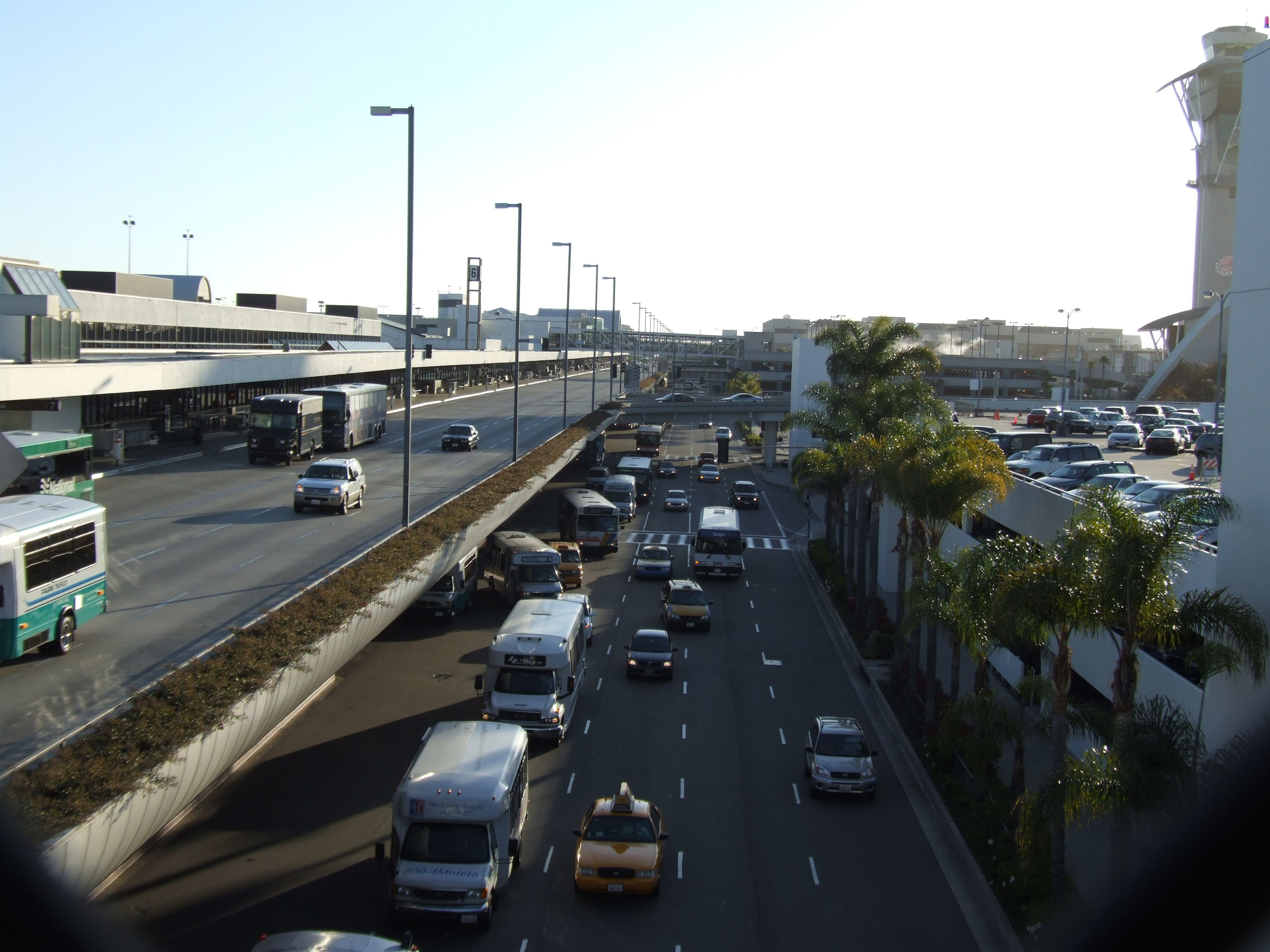
In November 1983, a second-level was added to World Way to address congestion

The Los Angeles International Airport has long struggled with gridlocked traffic on World Way, the main road that circles through the airport's central terminal area, that can often back up onto Century Boulevard or the Airport Tunnel, which connect the airport to Interstate 405 and Interstate 105 respectively.

Ahead of the 1984 Summer Olympics in Los Angeles, a second level was added to World Way, sending vehicles dropping off departing passengers to the upper level and those picking up arriving passengers to the lower. The relief was short-lived, and by the 2000s, the airport had ranked as one of the nation's most congested and hardest to navigate. That led airport managers to spend over US$15 billion to modernize the airport, with an automated people mover (APM) being one of the major improvements. The project was given added urgency in 2017 when Los Angeles was awarded its bid to host the 2028 Summer Olympics.

Further urgency involved the 2026 FIFA World Cup and the 2027 Super Bowl. In July 2024, Mayor Karen Bass stated that "it absolutely has to be finished by the time of the World Cup."

=== Planning ===
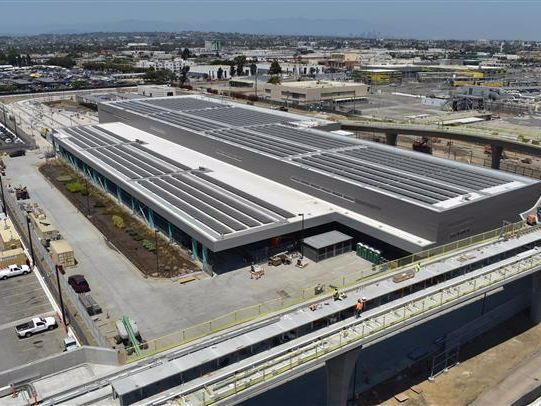
SkyLink Maintenance and Storage Facility

After receiving three bids, Los Angeles World Airports announced it had chosen LAX Integrated Express Solutions (LINXS) to design, build, finance, operate and maintain SkyLink for a period of 25 years. LINXS is a joint venture, public–private partnership of ACS, Alstom, Balfour Beatty, Fluor and Hochtief, with assistance from HDR and Flatiron West. The Los Angeles City Council approved the US$4.9 billion project on April 11, 2018. Of the total amount, US$1.9 billion was allocated for initial design and construction.

Beyond the construction of the SkyLink guideway and stations, LAX has also planned several projects that will enable or connect to SkyLink. New vertical cores will be built near each terminal, enabling vertical movement of passengers with elevators and escalators, as well as pedestrian bridges over World Way with moving walkways to connect terminals to the SkyLink stations and to existing airport parking structures. LAX is building cores between terminals 5 and 6, at terminals 7 and at terminal B (the Tom Bradley International Terminal) at the cost of $490 million. New cores were also included in larger renovation projects at terminals 1, 2, 3 and 4.

SkyLink will also connect to the LAX West Intermodal Transportation Facility (West ITF), a US$294.1 million, 4,300 space parking structure with a lot to pick up and drop off passengers and areas for shuttle buses, the LAX Rental Car Center (RCC), a massive parking structure that houses all of the major rental car companies that operate at LAX in one location located adjacent to Interstate 405, and to the LAX/Metro Transit Center (East ITF), connecting passengers to the Los Angeles Metro Rail C and K Lines and other transit services.

Altogether, these projects are called the Landside Access Modernization Program and are expected to cost a total of US$5.5 billion. By 2035, SkyLink is projected to reduce vehicle travel in the CTA by about 27% and eliminate more than 3,200 daily car-rental shuttle trips.

=== Construction ===
In 2018, 2,100 parking spaces in lot C were removed to reconfigure the area for the West ITF. Utility relocation started in the second quarter of 2018. Construction on the West ITF officially began in the summer of 2019 and ConRAC broke ground in September 2019. The first large concrete pour for SkyLink occurred in September 2020 at the West ITF station.

Construction on the 2.25 miles (3.62 km) of two-track elevated guideway began in the spring of 2019 with the first underground support columns being placed. The first concrete for the columns was poured in January 2020. The pouring of the concrete for the guideway began in September 2020 and it was completed in May 2022. A total of 69,700 cubic yards (53,300 m^{3}) of concrete was poured and one million work hours were completed to complete this project.

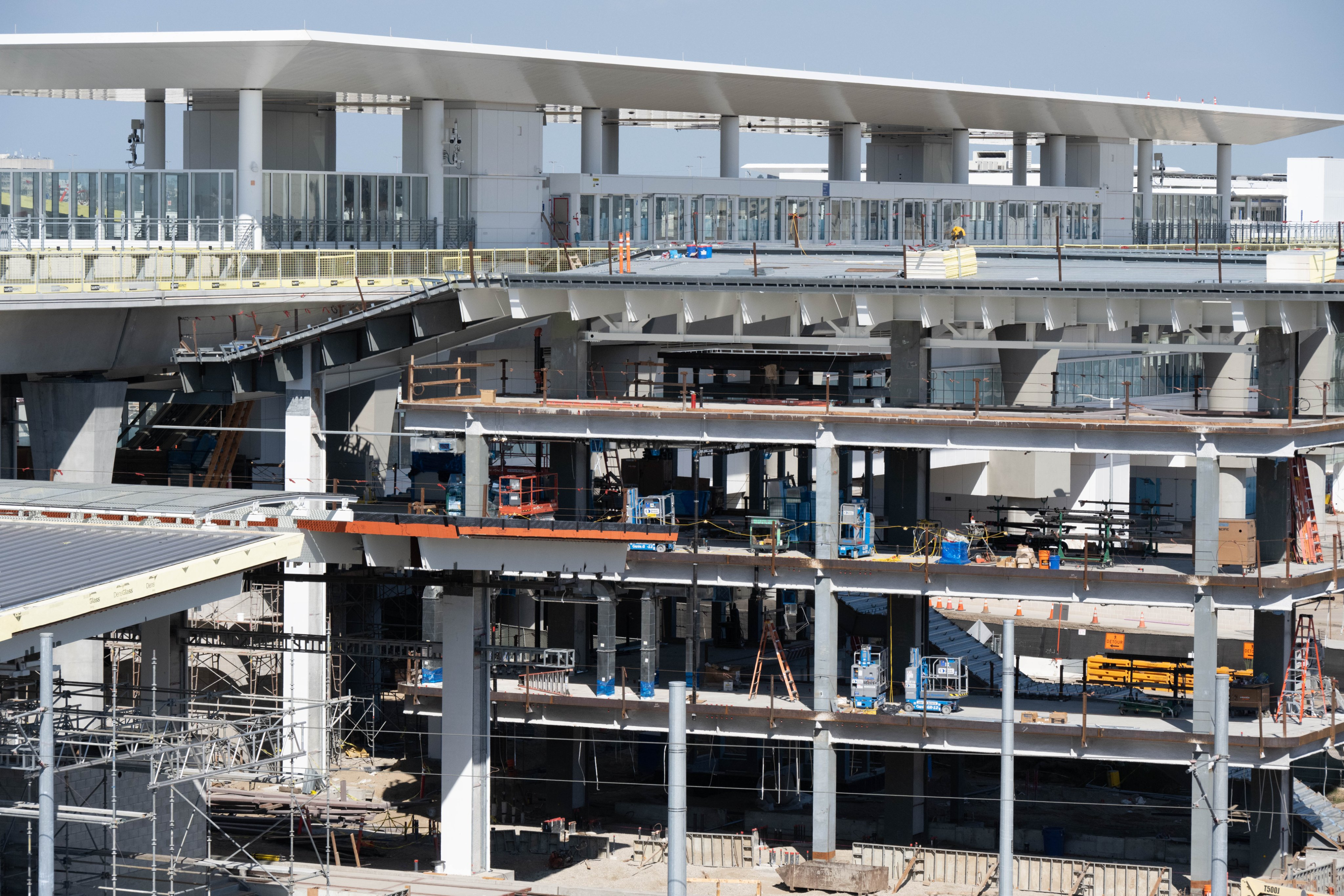
LAX/Metro Transit Center construction in September 2023

Connecting Los Angeles's Metro Rail system to the airport, which was studied by transit planners since the 1980s, started when Metro commenced construction on the LAX/Metro Transit Center on June 21, 2021. The new station will connect Metro and other transit services to the East ITF station. The new station will link SkyLink to the C and K rail lines, Metro Bus, and other municipal bus operator lines. Additionally, a customer service center and Metro Bike Hub will be constructed.

After two years of construction, West ITF's economy parking structure opened on October 19, 2021. Until SkyLink opens, temporary shuttle buses transport passengers between the airport and the facility.

As of May 2024, overall construction progress was 97.3% complete. On April 29, 2024, the project test drove the one-car Maintenance Service Vehicle on the guideway between the Maintenance and Storage Facility (MSF), West ITF, and ConRAC.

=== Construction delays ===
Construction of the line was originally scheduled for completion in March 2023, but the project has experienced multiple delays. In August 2025, Fitch Ratings projected that construction would be completed in January 2026, with testing and commissioning continuing through June 2026.

In addition to delays attributed to disputes between LAWA and LINXS, there are reports of legal disputes between LINXS and some subcontractors potentially causing further delays.

During the construction period, Los Angeles World Airports (LAWA) underwent several changes in executive leadership. John Ackerman was appointed CEO in February 2024, Chief Development Officer Terri Mestas left for a new position the following month, and three additional executives joined the agency in 2024.

A Los Angeles County Civil Grand Jury report concluded that the project’s delays stemmed from a strained relationship between LAWA and the LINXS consortium, political pressure to complete the people mover before major regional events, and shortcomings in the contract’s dispute-resolution provisions. The report attributed those shortcomings to the outside law firm Nossaman, which it said had been retained for its expertise in design–build contracts. According to the Grand Jury, these factors contributed to hundreds of millions of dollars in additional costs and prolonged dispute resolution.

On June 7, 2024, a technical expert serving as arbitrator under the contract (the “Project Neutral”) ruled that LAWA was responsible for 526 days of delay, having failed to act in good faith and comply with the contract documents, citing failures to timely integrate the people mover with airport communications systems and issues related to the construction of Metro Rail’s LAX/Metro Transit Center station, and awarded US$97 million in damages. The Grand Jury report stated that, following this ruling, LAWA lost confidence in the Project Neutral process, believing it to be biased in favor of the contractor.

The Grand Jury further noted that the Project Neutral was the sole dispute-resolution mechanism in the contract. Unlike agreements that provide for a panel of arbitrators, the people mover contract did not include such a provision, nor did it allow for the replacement of the Project Neutral once selected. The Grand Jury report characterized these features as defects in the contract drafted by Nossaman.

After the initial ruling, LINXS filed an additional 209 claims. According to the Grand Jury, the deteriorating relationship between the parties contributed to those claims remaining unresolved and coincided with a slowdown in construction progress. The report stated that LINXS “leveraged the change-order process” and the threat of litigation to obtain settlements while maintaining progress toward major upcoming events in the region.

LAWA and LINXS ultimately reached a “global settlement” covering all outstanding disputes for US$550 million, which formally extended the contractual completion date to December 2025. In total, LAWA agreed to more than US$880 million in change orders and dispute-related payments, including approximately US$252 million in design-related changes (attributed in project documents to regulatory requirements, unforeseen conditions, “betterments,” and document corrections), the US$97 million associated with the Project Neutral ruling, and the US$550 million global settlement..

The ongoing delays and disputes also affected the project’s financial outlook. In 2024, Fitch Ratings cited “extended construction delays, prolonged dispute resolution, and difficulties in the parties’ working relationship” when it reevaluated the credit rating of the US$1.2 billion in bonds financing the project. LINXS's private financing is described as "at risk to performance". Fitch's May 30, 2018, presale bond report had described the project's security package as "benefiting from a joint and several 35% liability cap with creditworthy parent companies." In an August 2025 update, Fitch again referred to the ongoing issues in connection with the revised target completion date of June 2026. System demonstration testing began on April 21, 2026, intending to demonstrate 30 days of uninterrupted operation without significant issues before passengers are allowed. This testing is ongoing and has already surfaced multiple issues as of September 2026, including problems with guideway expansion joints, train positioning and door operation, third rail and switch operation, and electrical-arc incidents that damaged power-system components. As part of its consent solicitation requesting an extension of its longstop dates, LINXS predicted a passenger service availability date of January 6, 2027.

==== Longstop dates ====
There is a contractual project longstop date, 12 months after the planned Passenger Service Availability (PSA) date. Failure to achieve PSA by the longstop date is considered a developer default under the DBFOM agreement. There is a similar lenders' longstop date 10 months (amended to 12 months as of September 20, 2026) after the planned PSA date. On July 21, 2026, Fitch Ratings downgraded approximately $1.2 billion in LINXS APM senior bonds to 'BB' from 'BB+' and placed the bonds on Rating Watch Negative, citing "a precarious position with a limited margin of safety before it could breach the lenders' longstop of Oct. 8, 2026, and the project longstop date of Dec. 8, 2026." On November 9, 2026, Fitch further downgraded these bonds to 'B-', retaining the Rating Watch Negative.

== Litigation ==
LINXS sued the city on July 9, 2026, over unresolved contract disputes, following the city's rejection of their claim in January. The complaint asserts that LAWA undertook a "meritless effort to blame the delay" on LINXS, along with a "concealment of the errors" by LADWP, among other alleged transgressions. LAWA has not filed an official answer to the complaint, but their legal strategy is partially explained in a July 24, 2026, filing where they object among other things to paragraph 124 of the complaint involving an overheard discussion of legal strategy. The docket shows a stipulation dated November 16, 2026 to continue the upcoming hearing.

== Gallery ==
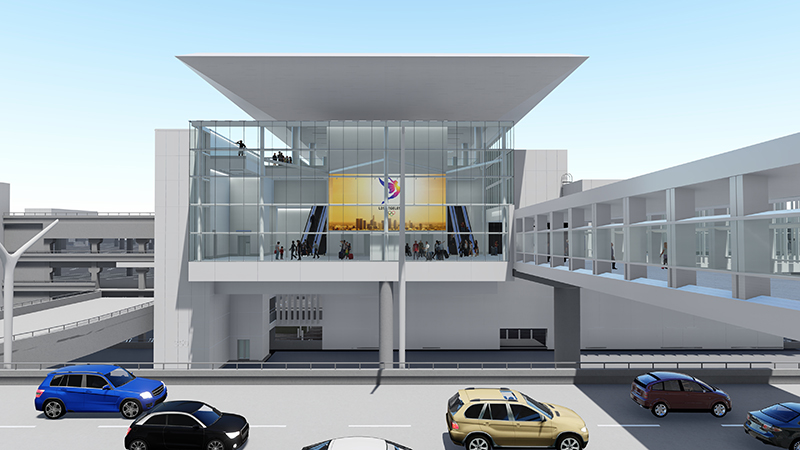
Rendering of West CTA station as seen from the Tom Bradley International Terminal

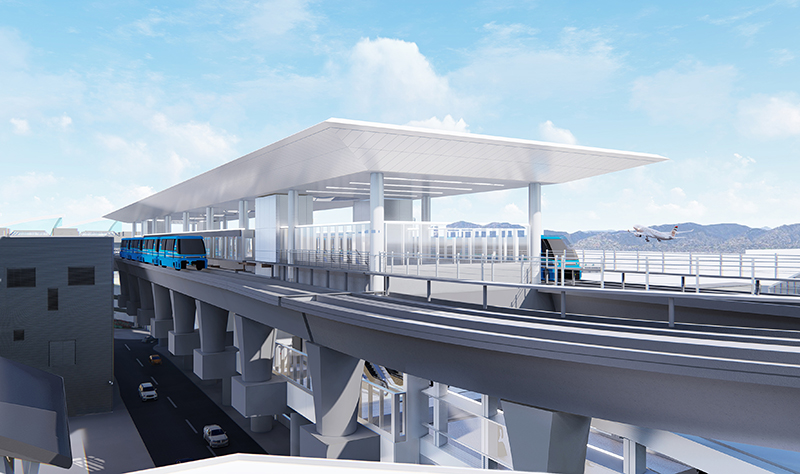
Rendering of the Center CTA station

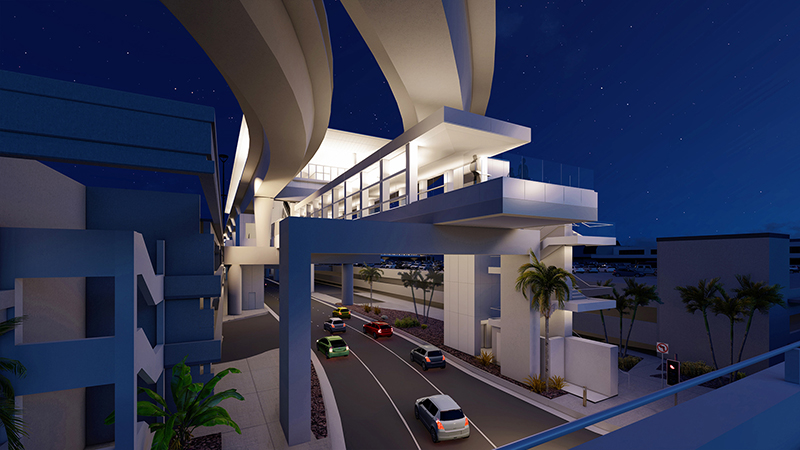
Rendering of the East CTA station and its viewing platform for the Theme Building
