= Los Angeles World Airports =

Airport authority based in Los Angeles, California, United States

Agency overview
- Formed: 1928
- Headquarters: 1 World Way; Los Angeles; Coordinates: 33.9428°N 118.4026°W
- Employees: 3,500 (includes Los Angeles Airport Police)
- Agency executives: John Ackerman, CEO; Karim Webb, President
- Parent agency: City of Los Angeles
- Child agency: Los Angeles Airport Police
- Website: lawa.org

Los Angeles World Airports (LAWA) is the airport authority of the city of Los Angeles, California, that owns and operates Los Angeles International Airport (LAX) and Van Nuys Airport (VNY). LAWA also owns and manages aviation-related property near Palmdale Regional Airport (PMD).

The authority's headquarters are on the grounds of LAX in the Los Angeles neighborhood of Westchester.

== History ==
LAWA was established in 1928 as the Los Angeles Department of Airports for the purpose of operating Los Angeles Municipal Airport, now known as Los Angeles International Airport or simply LAX.

The Department of Airports changed its name to Los Angeles World Airports in 1997.

== Current Airports ==
Los Angeles World Airports owns and operates two airports:

=== Los Angeles International Airport ===
Los Angeles opened its main airport on October 1, 1928. At the time of the opening, it was known as Mines Field and was little more than a dirt airstrip with no facilities. The first building, the historic Hangar No. 1, was erected in 1929. In 1930, the facility was renamed Los Angeles Municipal Airport, and mostly served general aviation. The facility was pressed into service as a military airfield during World War II. The airport started its conversion into a major passenger airport in 1946, and in 1949 became Los Angeles International Airport (LAX). The current U-shaped terminal area was added in 1961 and expanded several times.

LAX is the United States' second busiest airport (as of 2019) following Hartsfield–Jackson Atlanta International Airport. As the largest and busiest international airport on the U.S. West Coast, LAX is a major international gateway to the United States and also serves as a connection point for passengers traveling internationally.

=== Van Nuys Airport ===
The Van Nuys Airport was originally built as the Metropolitan Airport and was used by Timm Aircraft Corporation. The airport was purchased by the military in 1942 and operated as the Van Nuys Army Air Field. In 1949, after the end of the war, the Los Angeles Department of Airports acquired the facility and renamed it San Fernando Valley Airport and later Van Nuys Airport (VNY).

Today, Van Nuys is one of the busiest general aviation airports in the world, averaging over 230,000 takeoffs and landings annually.

== Former Airports ==
=== Ontario International Airport ===
In 1967, the city of Ontario in neighboring San Bernardino County asked the Los Angeles Department of Airports to enter into a Joint Powers Agreement for the operation and management of Ontario International Airport (ONT). The Los Angeles Department of Airports later acquired ONT from the city of Ontario in 1985, and expanded the airport's 485 acres of land to more than 1,700 acres and invested more than US$500 million in improvements.

In April 2013, the city of Ontario filed a legal complaint against LAWA alleging mismanagement of the Ontario Airport, which resulted in a 40% decline of traffic between 2007 and 2013. LAWA countered the complaint, saying the Great Recession was responsible for the decline in activity. After years of negotiations, LAWA sold its interest in ONT to the newly formed Ontario International Airport Authority (OIAA) in December 2015 for a total of US$190 million. It transferred operational management of the airport to OIAA on November 1, 2016.

=== Palmdale Regional Airport ===
In 1969, the Los Angeles Department of Airports began searching for a location to build a secondary international airport to relieve congestion at LAX. The location selected was in the Antelope Valley near the city of Palmdale.

From 1969 to 1983, LAWA acquired over 17,500 acres through voluntary acquisitions and eminent domain to develop an intercontinental airport. Development of "Palmdale Intercontinental Airport" never materialized due in part to lack of demand for commercial air services, environmental litigation, and opposition from the United States Air Force (USAF) whose Plant 42 is located adjacent to LAWA-acquired land.

The agency eventually entered into a lease agreement with the USAF to use Air Force Plant 42 runways and to build and operate a small terminal. Palmdale Regional Airport (PMD) began commercial operations in June 1971, but was not able to maintain steady demand with passenger traffic peaking in 1978 with 36,000 passengers before airline services eventually ceased in 1983. Two airlines began operating commercial services at PMD in 1990, but were again unable to maintain demand and ended services in 1998. In June 2007, United Airlines began operating at PMD, but ceased operations in December 2008 citing lack of demand.

At the end of 2013, LAWA transferred its lease with the USAF to the City of Palmdale.

== Operations ==
=== Ground transportation ===
LAWA operates the FlyAway bus service, which runs two shuttle routes between LAX and the following: Van Nuys in the San Fernando Valley, and Los Angeles Union Station in Downtown Los Angeles.

The agency is currently constructing SkyLink.

=== Law enforcement ===
LAWA maintains its own police department, the Los Angeles Airport Police sometimes referred to as "LAWAPD","LAXPD", or (APD). LAWAPD is the fourth largest law enforcement agency in Los Angeles County, with more than 1,100 law enforcement, security, and staff personnel. LAWAPD has patrolled jointly with the Los Angeles Police Department (LAPD) since the opening of the current terminal area in 1961. On December 9, 2021, LAWA celebrated the opening of its new-state-of-the-art Airport Police Facility (APF)headquarters. The new $216 million aviation police facility is the largest in the nation.

=== Revenue and expenditures ===
LAWA raises revenue by collecting aircraft landing fees, in addition to property leases and concession fees from airport tenants. LAWA still owns over 17,500 acres of land in the Antelope Valley that was acquired for the never-developed "Palmdale Intercontinental Airport" and generates revenue by leasing portions of it.

Expenditures include runway and building maintenance fees, capital improvements and administration.

== Governance ==
LAWA is a branch of the city of Los Angeles and is governed by a seven-member Board of Airport Commissioners. The Los Angeles City Charter requires one member to reside within the area surrounding LAX and another member to reside within the area surrounding the Van Nuys Airport. The board is appointed by the Mayor of Los Angeles and approved by Los Angeles City Council. The Mayor also appoints the executive director who oversees over 4,000 employees and the day-to-day operations of the two airports.

Board of Airport Commissioners

As of April 2024, the Board of Airport Commissioners are as follows:

- Karim Webb, President
- Matthew M. Johnson, Vice President
- Vanessa Aramayo
- Courtney La Bau
- Victor Narro
- Nicholas P. Roxborough
- Valeria C. Velasco

List of Executive Directors

Below is the list of LAWA Executive Directors from 1928 to the present:

- Clifford W. Henderson (1928–1938)
- Richard Barnitz (1938–1940)
- Woodruff DeSilva (1940–1944)
- Clarence Young (1944–1950)
- John W. Reeves Jr. (1950–1954)
- Robert A. McMillan (1954–1959)
- Francis T. Fox (1959–1968)
- Clifton A. Moore (1968–1993)
- John J. Driscoll (1993–1999)
- Lydia H. Kennard (1999–2003 and 2005–2007)
- Kim Day (2003-2005)
- Gina Marie Lindsey (2007–2015)
- Deborah A. Flint (2015–2020)
- Justin Erbacci (2020–2023)
- Beatrice Hsu (2023-2023)
- John Ackerman (2023-present)

== Awards ==
- LAX Coastal Area Chamber of Commerce Sustainability Award, after a $737 million renovation of LAX's Tom Bradley International Terminal in 2010 (final cost estimated to be $2 billion)

== See also ==
- List of airports in the Los Angeles area
