= List of former Metro Local routes =

This is a list of former Los Angeles Metro Metro Local bus routes in Los Angeles County, California.

Metro buses are given line numbers that indicate the type of service offered. This method was devised originally by the Southern California Rapid Transit District, Metro's predecessor.

- Line numbers lower than 100 are local routes to/from Downtown Los Angeles, numbered counterclockwise from least to greatest.
- Line numbers in the 100s are local east–west routes in other areas
- Line numbers in the 200s are local north–south routes in other areas
- Line numbers in the 300s are limited-stop routes
- Line numbers in the 600s are shuttle/circulator routes

== 1–99 ==
=== 1 – Downtown LA – Hollywood – Century City via Sunset Bl and Hollywood Bl ===
Line 1 was cancelled on June 12, 1999, as a result of the opening of the B Line extension to Hollywood/Vine. Alternatives include Line 4 along Santa Monica Bl, Lines 180 and 217 along Hollywood Bl, and Lines 2 and 4 along Sunset Bl.

=== 3 – Downtown LA – Beverly Hills (Beverwil Dr/Pico) via Sunset Bl and Canon Dr ===
Line 3 was cancelled on June 29, 2003. Alternatives include Lines 2 on Sunset Bl and 617 on Canon Dr (previously operated by Line 14 before it was shortened to Beverly Center in June 2021).

=== 11 – Downtown LA – Vermont/Beverly B Line Station – West Hollywood via Melrose Ave and Temple St ===
Line 11 was cancelled on June 24, 2007. The majority of the route was duplicated by Line 10 with the exception of the deviation to Vermont/Beverly B Line Station.

=== 17 – Downtown LA – Beverly Hills – Culver City via 3rd St and Robertson Bl ===
Line 17 was cancelled on June 27, 2021, as part of Metro's network restructuring through the NextGen Bus Plan. Service on 3rd St was merged back into Line 16 while new Line 617 replaced service on Robertson Bl. Line 17 began service on June 26, 2016, replacing former Line 220, which provided service on Robertson Bl.

=== 21 – Downtown LA – UCLA via Wilshire Bl and Westwood Bl ===
Line 21 was cancelled on June 24, 2007. The majority of the route was duplicated by the route of Line 20 except the Westwood Bl segment. Current alternative services on Westwood Bl are provided by Big Blue Bus Lines 8 and 12.

=== 22 – Downtown LA – Beverly Hills – Century City – Brentwood – Santa Monica via Wilshire Bl and San Vicente Bl ===
Line 22 ran alongside Lines 20, 21, 320, and 322 on Wilshire Bl. Like Line 20, it ran between Downtown LA and Santa Monica with several differences; Line 22 had a deviation to Century City and a portion of the route was provided to San Vicente Bl in Brentwood and Santa Monica area. On June 25, 2000, Line 22 was shortened to run as a shuttle between Santa Monica and Beverly Hills while Lines 20, 21, and the recently implemented Line 720 operated additional services on Wilshire Bl. Three years later on June 29, 2003, Line 22 was eliminated and was replaced by the now defunct Big Blue Bus Line 4. Current alternatives to the original Line 22 include Metro Lines 20, 720, and Big Blue Bus Line 18.

=== 26 – Boyle Heights – Downtown LA – Hollywood via 7th St, Virgil Ave, and Franklin Ave ===
Line 26 was cancelled on June 26, 2011, as part of service cuts due to a budget crisis. Alternatives include Metro Lines 204 and 754 and the Metro B Line on Vermont Ave; LADOT DASH Hollywood on Franklin Ave; and Metro Line 51 and DASH Line E on 7th St.

=== 27 – Downtown LA – Century City via Olympic Bl, San Vicente Bl, and Burton Way ===
Line 27 was cancelled on June 30, 2002. The route had duplications with the then-current routes of Lines 16/316 (now Line 617), 28/328 (later 28/728, now Line 28), 550 and 576 (later 30/330, now a portion of Line 16). As of June 27, 2021, Line 27's former segment on San Vicente Bl was abandoned, while service on Burton Way was replaced by Line 617 (the same time when replaced the old portion of Line 16, which now terminates at West Hollywood).

=== 31 – Pico / Rimpau – East LA College via Pico Bl and 1st St ===
Line 31 was cancelled on June 27, 2010, as part of service cuts due to a budget crisis. The majority of the route was duplicated by the routes of Lines 30 and 730 (now Line 30). Service on 1st St east of Indiana St was replaced with an extension of Line 287, but was then cancelled on June 26, 2011. For a year, service on 1st St had no service until June 2012, when Line 68 implemented a new shuttle extension from ELAC to Indiana L Line (now E Line) Station due to popular demand. The shuttle ran until June 2016, when service was replaced with Line 106 (renumbered to Line 74 in December 2025). Weekend service was not provided on 1st St from June 26, 2011, when the extension of Line 287 was cancelled until June 27, 2021, when Line 106 (now Line 74) was expanded to a seven-day-a-week service.

=== 34 – Downtown LA – Venice via Venice Bl and Rose Ave ===
Line 34 ran alongside most of Line 33 between Venice and Downtown LA except it was diverted to Rose Ave. Line 34 was later cancelled in June 1995 due to low ridership. On October 23, 2024, Line 34 was revived as the new line number for the Dodger Stadium Express as an honor to the former Los Angeles Dodgers' pitcher Fernando Valenzuela, who died a day before.

=== 42/42A – Downtown LA – LAX – Redondo Beach via Martin Luther King, Jr. Bl, Stocker St, and Highland Ave ===
Line 42/42A was cancelled in June 2012 due to the opening of the Metro E Line. Alternatives include Line 40 east of Martin Luther King Jr/Western to Downtown LA, Line 102 extension west of Martin Luther King Jr/Western to LAX; and the Metro E Line. Line 42A was a short line route with a slight different routing while line 42 was the core route of the line. Previously between 1983 and 1986 in the SCRTD era, Line 42 used to run as far south to Redondo Beach, but was shortened to LAX City Bus Center with its express counterpart Line 439 was adjusted and extended to Redondo Beach as a replacement of Line 42. However, in late 2005 Line 439 was shortened in Aviation / LAX Station with Beach Cities Transit taking operations south of LAX.

=== 46 – South LA – Downtown LA – Montecito Heights via Broadway – Griffin Ave ===
Line 46 was cancelled in December 2007. The majority of the route was duplicated by the route of Line 45 except the Griffin Ave portion which was replaced by an extension of Line 252 (later replaced by Line 182).

=== 52 – Harbor Gateway Transit Center – Wilshire Center via Avalon Bl, San Pedro St, and 7th St ===
Line 52 was cancelled on June 27, 2021, with service being merged into Line 51, which was modified to terminate at CSU Dominguez Hills, covering most of the former route. Alternatives to reach the Harbor Gateway Transit Center include Torrance Transit Lines 6 and 13. Line 52 began service in 2001.

=== 56 – Downtown L.A. – Florence-Firestone – Willowbrook – Compton – Carson (SouthBay Pavillon) via Long Beach Ave, Maie Ave, and Willowbrook Ave ===
Line 56 was canceled in June 2003. Alternatives include Lines 55, 205, and 611, the Metro A Line, and the DASH Chesterfield Square, Pueblo Del Rio, and Watts routes.

=== 58 – Chinatown – Union Station – Washington A Line Station via Alameda St ===
Line 58 was cancelled in June 2005 due to low ridership with alternatives available on Metro A Line. It began service as part of a pilot program in October 2000.

=== 61 – Downtown LA – Rancho Los Amigos via Long Beach Bl and Tweedy Bl ===
Line 61 was cancelled sometime before 1994. The majority of the route north of South Gate was duplicated with Lines 60 and 360 (later Line 360 became Line 760 in June 2007, but then cancelled in December 2020 as part of NextGen Bus Plan). Service along Tweedy Bl to Rancho Los Amigos was replaced by an extension of Line 117.

=== 65 – Downtown LA (Washington/Figueroa) – Boyle Heights (Olympic/Soto) – Cal State LA via Washington Bl, Indiana St, and Gage Ave ===
Line 65 service west of Soto St was cancelled on June 24, 2007. This portion of the route was duplicated with Montebello Bus Lines Line 50. The remainder of the route was renumbered to Line 665 (this line was then shortened to Olympic/Indiana in December 2020 with Line 66 taking place on Olympic Bl). In June 2023, Line 665 was extended from Cal State LA to Huntington/Monterey (Rose Hill Transit Center) to replace a portion of Line 256.

=== 67 – Montebello – Wilshire Center via East Olympic Bl and 8th St ===
Line 67 was cancelled on June 27, 1998. The majority of the route was duplicated with Lines 65 (now Line 665), 66, 104 (now Montebello Bus Lines Line 50), and 362 (now Line 62). In June 2025, Line 66 was rerouted back on Olympic Bl (for the first time since its brief relocation in 1998) making it identical to the former Line 67 route.

=== 68 – Washington/Fairfax Transit Hub – Downtown LA – ELAC – Indiana Station – The Shops at Montebello via Washington Bl, Cesar E. Chavez Ave, 1st St, and Riggin St ===
Line 68 was cancelled on June 27, 2021, as part of Metro's network restructuring through the NextGen Bus Plan. Line 70 was rerouted to replace service on E. Cesar E. Chavez Ave, while Line 106 replaced service on Riggin St east of Atlantic Bl to The Shops at Montebello. Line 68 used to operate as far west as Washington/Fairfax Transit Hub, but service was cut back to Downtown LA in December 2007 when Line 35 replaced service on Washington Bl. At one point between 2012 and 2016, Line 68 had a weekday short line trip extension from ELAC to Indiana L Line (now part of E Line) Station via 1st St until this branch was replaced by Line 106 (now Line 74).

Line 68 was featured briefly in the music video for Vanessa Carlton's 2002 song "A Thousand Miles".

=== 71 – Downtown LA – LA General Medical Hospital – Cal State LA via Wabash Ave and Marengo St ===
Line 71 was cancelled on June 26, 2021, as part of Metro's network restructuring through the NextGen Bus Plan. Line 106 (now Line 74) was rerouted to replace the majority of Line 71's route east of Union Station, with alternative service into Downtown LA being provided by Lines 70, 76, and 78.

=== 79 – Downtown LA – Arcadia via Mission Rd and Huntington Dr ===
Line 79 was cancelled on December 19, 2021, as part of Metro's network restructuring through the NextGen Bus Plan. Service east of Rose Hill Transit Center to Arcadia L Line Station (now A Line). was retained and renumbered to Line 179, with service to Downtown LA being merged into Line 78.

=== 83 – Downtown LA – Eagle Rock via Pasadena Ave and York Bl ===
Line 83 was cancelled on June 27, 2021, as part of Metro's network restructuring through the NextGen Bus Plan. Line 182 replaced service on York Bl. Lines 45, 81, and 251, and the Metro A Line provide alternate service on some portions of the former route. Metro Micro also operates in part of Line 83's former service area.

=== 84 – Downtown LA – Eagle Rock Plaza via Cypress Ave and Eagle Rock Bl ===
Line 84 was merged into Line 28 in June 2014, with service on the former Line 84 segment later replaced by an extension of Line 251 on June 27, 2021.

=== 85 – Downtown LA – Glendale College via Cypress Ave, Eagle Rock Bl, and Verdugo Rd ===
Line 85 service south of Glassell Park was cancelled in December 2006. This portion of the route was duplicated with Lines 83 (later went defunct in June 2021) and 84 (later Line 28, now Line 251). The remainder of the route was renumbered to Line 685 (this line was then cancelled in June 2021 in favor of Metro Micro).

=== 91 – Downtown LA – Glendale – Sunland – Sylmar (Olive View Medical Center) via Honolulu Ave and Glendale Ave ===
Line 91 was cancelled on June 27, 2021, as part of Metro's network restructuring through the NextGen Bus Plan. Except for service on Honolulu Ave, the entirety of Line 91 was duplicated with Line 90. Glendale Beeline Lines 3 and 31 provide alternate service on Honolulu Ave.

=== 93 – Sylmar Station – Burbank – Downtown LA via Glenoaks Bl, Brand Bl, Glendale Bl, and Allesandro St (First Generation) ===
Line 93 was cancelled in June 2003 as the majority of the route was duplicated by the route of Line 92 and Line 410 north of Colorado in Glendale which was cancelled at the same time. Service on Allesandro St was replaced by Line 603. In June 2025, Line 93 returned to service as a renumbering from Line 603 (coincidentally returning service on Allessandro under the new Line 93).

=== 96 – Sherman Oaks – North Hollywood – Universal City – Downtown Burbank Station – LA Zoo – Chinatown – Downtown LA via Riverside Dr, Olive Ave, and Crystal Springs Dr ===
Line 96 used to run from North Hollywood (Valley Plaza) (later rerouted to Sherman Oaks (Van Nuys/Moorpark) to replace Line 97) to Downtown LA (Grand/Venice) via Burbank and LA Zoo. In 2011, Line 96 was truncated to run between Downtown LA and Downtown Burbank Station. Line 155 replaced Line 96 west of Downtown Burbank Station to Sherman Oaks. On June 27, 2021, Line 96 was truncated again, from Downtown LA to Chinatown near Union Station. In December 2024, Line 96 was renumbered to Line 296, truncating service for the third time, but to Lincoln/Cypress A Line Station, omitting service to Downtown LA. Metro A Line and Lines 81, 90, and 94 will provide alternative service south of Cypress Park to Downtown LA.

=== 97 – Sherman Oaks – Downtown LA via Riverside Dr, Alameda Av, Main St, and Victory Bl ===
Line 97 was cancelled in June 1995. The majority of the route was duplicated by the route of Line 96 (now Line 296), which was rerouted to replace the old Line 97 service on Riverside Dr west of Lankershim Bl to Sherman Oaks. As of 2011, this segment was replaced by Line 155 and BurbankBus Pink Route.

== 100–199 ==
=== 103 – Baldwin Hills (Baldwin Hills Crenshaw) – Vernon (38th / Soto) via Santa Barbara Ave (Martin Luther King, Jr. Bl), 41st St, and 38th St ===
Line 103 was cancelled in June 1995. Alternatives include Lines 40 and 102. The DASH King-East and Southeast routes would later provide service on portions of the former route after its cancellation.

=== 104 – Downtown LA – Boyle Heights – Whittier – La Mirada – Fullerton via Washington Bl and La Mirada Bl ===
Line 104 was transferred to Montebello Bus Lines as their Line 50 in June 2000. After an extension in June 1999, Line 104 became the first 100-series line to operate into Downtown LA. Since then, two other routes have held the same distinction: former Line 156, which operated owl service to Downtown LA in the early 2000s, and Line 106 which was extended into Downtown LA in September 2021 until it was renumbered to Line 74 in December 2025. Prior to 1999, Line 104 used to run between Boyle Heights (Olympic/Soto) and Fullerton Park & Ride (later shortened to La Mirada).

=== 106 – Monterey Park (Atlantic / Gavery) – Cal State LA – LA General Hospital – Union Station – Boyle Heights – East LA College – The Shops At Montebello via Garvey Av, Wabash St, 1st St, and Riggin St ===
Line 106 made its debut on June 27, 2016, replacing the shuttle service on Line 68 on 1st St in East LA and the majority of the shuttle service through Boyle Heights on Line 620. Originally started as a weekday only service. On June 27, 2021, Line 106 received a major route overhaul. Line 106 was extended from East LA College to The Shops at Montebello replacing Line 68 on Riggin St (which was discontinued when Line 70 took over Line 68 on Cesar E. Chavez). Line 106 was also extended from LA General Medical Hospital to Monterey Park replacing the old Lines 70 and 71 routes to Garvey / Atlantic in Monterey Park via Wabash Ave, City Terrace Dr, and Cal State LA. Additionally, Line 106 also provided a more direct route in 1st St (when indirectly replaced Line 30 in June 2023) instead of Boyle Av and 4th St from its old route. The service was upgraded from a weekday only service to a full 7-day service. In September 2021, from the popular demand of wanting to restore the connection that were previously provided by Lines 70 and 71, Line 106 was further extended west to serve Union Station and Little Tokyo/Arts District Station in Downtown LA, resulting service on State St to be discontinued (effectively removing service previously provided by Line 620 on State St). This extension resulted Line 106 to become the third 100-series line (after former Lines 104 and 156) to serve Downtown LA until it was renumbered to Line 74 in December 2025.

=== 107 – Cudahy – Inglewood via Santa Ana St and 54th St ===
Line 107 was cancelled in June 2004 due to low ridership. Alternatives include Lines 110, 611, and DASH's Chesterfield Square, Southeast, and Leimert/Slauson routes. Service in Windsor Hills and Inglewood was originally retained as a circulator, Line 607, but was later cancelled in December 2020.

=== 112 – Hyde Park – Lynwood via Florence Ave and Otis St ===
Line 112 ran alongside Line 111 via Florence Bl between Crenshaw Bl and Otis St. It was cancelled in June 2003 with portions on Florence Ave and Otis St were reconfigured into a new circulator, Line 612, which was later cancelled in December 2020 in favor of Metro Micro

=== 114 – Florence A Line Station – Bell Gardens/Downey via Seville Ave, Santa Ana St, and Clara St ===
Line 114 was cancelled in June 2001. Alternatives include Lines 102, 111, and 251. Service on Santa Ana St was initially merged with Line 107, then transferred to Line 611 after its cancellation.

=== 119 – Hawthorne/Lennox C Line Station – Lynwood via 108th St, Fernwood Ave, and King Bl ===
Line 119 was cancelled on June 24, 2007. Before its cancellation, service east of 103rd St/Watts Towers Station was replaced with Line 612, which was later cancelled in December 2020 in favor of Metro Micro. Currently, a very small segment is still served by The Link – Athens on 108th St.

=== 121 – Willowbrook/Rosa Parks Station – Norwalk/Santa Fe Springs Station – Whittwood Town Center via E Imperial Highway and Leffingwell Rd ===
Line 121 was created in 1995 to replace Line 120 east of Willowbrook/Rosa Parks Station to Norwalk/Santa Fe Springs Station (later was truncated to Norwalk C Line Station in 2003, but then, was extended to Whittwood Town Center to replace Line 111's eastern segment in 2006), despite the split, most trips were still interlined. Line 121 was remerged back into Line 120 on June 26, 2011, as part of service cuts due to a budget crisis, and also an improvement to enhance a one-seat ride.

=== 124 – El Segundo – Willowbrook/Rosa Parks Station – Compton Station via El Segundo Bl and Santa Fe Ave ===
Line 124 was cancelled in June 2009 as part of service cuts due to a budget crisis. The route was handed over to GTrans (then known as Gardena Municipal Bus Lines), which operates it as their Line 5 on El Segundo Bl east of Sepulveda Bl (later east of Aviation Bl) to Willowbrook while Beach Cities Transit Line 109 took over Line 124 segment on Grand Ave west of Sepulveda Bl. At one point Line 124 used to run east to Compton Station, but was later truncated to Willowbrook/Rosa Parks due to near duplication with Metro Lines 202 and 205; and Metro A Line.

=== 126 – Manhattan Beach – Hawthorne/Lennox Station via Manhattan Beach Bl and Yukon Ave ===
Line 126 was cancelled in December 2020 due to low ridership. Alternatives include Lines 40, 125, 210, 211/215, 232, Torrance Transit Line 8, and Beach Cities Transit Line 109. As of April 2023, Beach Cities Transit has studied the possibility of a seasonal "summer route" between Manhattan Beach City Hall and the Redondo Beach C Line Station, which would be similar to the route of former Line 126.

=== 130 – Redondo Beach – Los Cerritos Center – Fullerton Park & Ride via Artesia Bl ===
Line 130 was allocated to three separate municipal agencies. It once ran far east to Fullerton Park and Ride until it was shortened to Los Cerritos Center in December 2003 due to low ridership. Service between Los Cerritos Center and Fullerton Park and Ride was allocated to OCTA's Line 30, although it served on Oranthrope Avenue/South St instead of Artesia Bl. On June 27, 2021, the western half of the route from Artesia A Line Station to Redondo Beach was taken over by Torrance Transit as their new Line 13. On its final year, Line 130 remained in service between Artesia Station and Los Cerritos Center as LA Metro. On June 26, 2022, Long Beach Transit took over the eastern half of the route as their new Route 141. This resulted in the end of Metro's "most southernmost east-west corridor route" after over 45 years in service.

=== 146 – San Pedro – Long Beach via 7th St and Anaheim St ===
Line 146 was discontinued. Alternatives include Metro Lines, 205, 232, 446/447 (now 246), and LADOT Commuter Express Line 142.

=== 147 – San Pedro – Park Western Plaza – Barton Hill ===
Line 147 was replaced by Lines 205, 246; Metro J Line, and DASH San Pedro.

=== 149 – Long Beach – Westminster – Buena Park – Anaheim – Orange – Riverside ===
Line 149 was discontinued. Portions of the Line are currently operated via OCTA Lines 29, 46, 50, and 794. East of Anaheim & Village of Orange via Riverside Freeway, portions of the line were also turned over to Riverside Transit Agency as Line 149, later Line 216, now known as Line 200. Line 149 along with Line 496 were the only two lines that serve more than three counties.

=== 153 – Woodland Hills – Sun Valley Metrolink Station – North Hollywood Station via Vineland Ave, Roscoe Bl, and Fallbrook Ave ===
Line 153 was canceled in December 2009 due to a budget crisis and almost fully duplicated with Line 152 except the Metrolink Station deviation. This bus number might be coming back due to its NextGen Bus Plan; however, it will not be the same route as it ran before. The new line 153 would replace Line 154 east of North Hollywood.

=== 156 – Panorama City – Van Nuys – Hollywood – Downtown LA (Owl) via Van Nuys Bl, Burbank Bl and Cahuenga Pass ===
Line 156 was the successor of Line 420 which took operation on the local segment after the B Line extension to North Hollywood in 2000. Later Line 156 became Line 237 extension from Van Nuys and Hollywood in June 2016. Then in 2021, Line 237 retained a portion of Line 156 on Burbank Bl while Lines 222 and 224 replaced the portion of Line 156 south of North Hollywood.

=== 163 – UCLA West Valley Medical Center (West Hills Medical Center) – Sun Valley – Hollywood via Sherman Way and Hollywood Way ===
Line 163 was canceled after June 27, 2021, as Metro was restructuring its network for the 2nd phase for the NextGen Bus Plan. Most of Line 162 covers Line 163 except the remaining north of Vineland Ave to Sun Valley. Line 163 used to run as far southeast to Hollywood until it was split in Sun Valley when Line 222 covered the Hollywood Way alignment in June 2008.

=== 168 – Chatsworth – Pacoima via Paxton St and Lassen St ===
Line 168 was discontinued in December 2010 due to a budget crisis and low ridership. Nearby alternatives include Metro Lines 158 (on Devonshire St), 167 (on Plummer St), 233 and 761 (on Van Nuys Bl); and LADOT DASH Pacoima (on Paxton St).

=== 170 – El Monte station – The Shops At Montebello – Cal State LA via Elliot Ave, Rush St, Parkway Dr, and Hellman Ave ===
Line 170 eastern terminus was shortened from Cal State LA to Shops At Montebello in December 2005 along with a route simplification in South El Monte. Those portions were replaced by Metro Lines 70, 76, and 106 (near Hellman Ave) while service on Elliot Ave and Parkway Dr were replaced by the El Monte Transit Green And Yellow Routes. During its final years of operation, Line 170 ran in a shorter route between The Shops At Montebello and El Monte station until June 2007 when Line 287 took over operation with minimal route changes. In a brief moment, Line 287 became Line 176 in 2012 which was reverted to Line 287 in 2021.

=== 175 – Hollywood – Silver Lake via Fountain Ave and Hyperion Ave ===
Line 175 was discontinued after June 27, 2021, as Metro was restructuring its network for the 2nd phase of the NextGen Bus Plan and also due to low ridership. New Line 182 replaced the eastern segment of Line 175 between Vermont/Sunset B Line Station and John Marshall High School. While Metro Lines 2, 4, and 207; and DASH Hollywood replaced the remainder segments.

=== 176 – Glassell Park – Highland Park – El Monte – Montebello via Mission Dr and Rush St ===
Line 176 was discontinued in June 2021 as part of Metro's NextGen Bus Plan. Service between Montebello and El Monte station was reverted to Line 287 (which it replaced in 2012). Service between South Pasadena and Highland Park was replaced by rerouted Line 258. The remainder was replaced by Metro Micro; City of El Monte Commuter Shuttle services; Metro Bus Lines 76, 78, 179, 260, 261, 266, 267, 487; and Montebello Bus Lines 20 and 30.

=== 177 – Glendale – La Cañada Flintridge – JPL – Pasadena – Caltech – Sierra Madre – Arcadia – Monrovia – Duarte – City of Hope via Verdugo St and Foothill Bl ===
Line 177 used to run between Glendale Galleria to Duarte/City of Hope via JPL. In 2000, Line 177 between Glendale and La Cañada Flintridge was replaced by Metro Line 90 and Glendale Beeline Line 33. In 2005, Line 177 was shortened to Sierra Madre Villa Station (later to Pasadena City College in 2010, and then Caltech in 2018). Services to Sierra Madre Villa Station and Duarte/City of Hope were replaced by Metro A Line; Metro Lines 179 and 267; and Foothill Transit Lines 187, 272, and 861. Since then Line 177 only ran between Caltech and Jet Propulsion Laboratory during its final years of operation (with minor route changes) until it was transferred to Pasadena Transit as their Line 53 on December 15, 2024, part of the NextGen Bus Plan.

=== 178 – El Monte – Baldwin Park – West Covina – Walnut – Cal Poly Pomona via Valinda Ave and La Puente Rd ===
Line 178 was transferred to Foothill Transit in August 1989. Since 2001, Foothill Transit Line 178 has been modified to terminate at Puente Hills Mall while Foothill Transit Line 289 took over operations on La Puente Rd.

=== 181 – Hollywood – Glendale – Sierra Madre Villa Station via Colorado Bl and Yosemite Ave ===
Line 181 was canceled after June 27, 2021, as Metro was restructuring its network for the 2nd phase of the NextGen Bus Plan. Most of Line 180 covers Line 181 except the Yosemite Ave alignment and east of Hill St. Service on Yosemite was replaced by rerouted Line 81, and service east of Hill St to Sierra Madre Villa Station was replaced by Foothill Transit Line 187 and potentially a rerouted Pasadena Transit Line 10.

=== 183 – Sherman Oaks – Burbank – Glendale via Magnolia Ave and Kenneth St ===
Line 183 was canceled on June 27, 2021, as Metro continued restructuring its network for the 2nd phase of the NextGen Bus Plan. Service west of B Line North Hollywood Station to Sherman Oaks was replaced by an extension of Line 155. Line 94 was relocated to replace Line 183 between North Hollywood Station and Downtown Burbank. New Metro Micro (transit on-demand) service and existing Glendale Beeline 4 also replaced the Line 183 segments on Chevy Chase/Acacia/Verdugo in Glendale, and Bel Aire Dr/Kenneth Rd in Burbank.

=== 185 – Hacienda Heights – West Covina – Montclair via Hacienda Bl, Irwindale Ave, and Arrow Hwy ===
Line 185 was transferred to Foothill Transit in August 1989. Since then, it remained in service on Hacienda St-Irwindale Ave while Foothill Transit Line 492 took over on Arrow Hwy.

=== 187 – Pasadena – Azusa – Glendora – Pomona via Foothill Bl and Towne Ave ===
Line 187 was transferred to Foothill Transit in August 1989. Since then, it was rerouted from Pomona to Montclair but later was split in Azusa with Foothill Transit Line 187 running west of Azusa to Pasadena and Foothill Transit Line 188 running east of Azusa to Montclair.

=== 188 – Altadena – Duarte/City of Hope via N Fair Oaks Ave, East Colorado Bl, and Duarte Rd ===
Line 188 was canceled in June 2003, following the advent of the former Metro L Line now part of A Line; replaced by a rerouted Lines 260/361 (later 260/762, now Line 660) on Fair Oaks Ave, an extension of Line 181 (now discontinued) on Colorado Bl, and rerouted Line 264 (now discontinued) on Duarte Rd; and Foothill Transit Line 187 on Colorado Bl.

=== 190 – El Monte station – Cal Poly Pomona via Ramona Bl ===
Line 190 was the former Line 490 in which was replaced with the opening of the J Line in December 2009. This line (and its sister Line 194) were transferred to Foothill Transit in June 2016 (marking the end of the era for services in the eastern San Gabriel Valley area).

=== 192 – Pomona via Arroyo Ave, North White Ave, and San Bernardino Ave ===
Line 192 was transferred to Foothill Transit in December 1988 by the former LACTC (Los Angeles County Transportation Commission, now part of Metro) when the former SCRTD (Southern California Rapid Transit Authority, predecessor of Metro) announced cuts that would adversely impact services in San Gabriel Valley. Since then it was replaced by several Foothill Transit Lines in the Pomona area.

=== 194 – Pomona via West Ninth St, South Towne Ave, and Arrow Hwy (First Generation) ===
The first generation of Line 194 was massive different to its second generation (not to be confused with the second generation of Line 194 on Valley Bl). This line was transferred to Foothill Transit in December 1988 by the former LACTC (Los Angeles County Transportation Commission, now part of Metro) when the former SCRTD (Southern California Rapid Transit Authority, predecessor of Metro) announced cuts that would adversely impact services in San Gabriel Valley. Since then it was replaced by several Foothill Transit Lines within the Pomona area.

=== 194 – El Monte station – Cal Poly Pomona via Valley Bl (Second Generation) ===
The second generation of Line 194 was the former Line 484 in which was replaced with the opening of the J Line in December 2009. This line (and its sister Line 190) were transferred to Foothill Transit in June 2016 (marking the end of the era for services in the eastern San Gabriel Valley area). This is not to be confused with the first generation of Line 194 which ran in the Pomona city limits before it was also transferred to Foothill Transit.

== 200–299 ==
=== 200 – Echo Park – Exposition Park via Echo Park Bl, Alvarado St, Hoover St ===
Line 200 was discontinued on December 19, 2021, as Metro continued the 3rd phase for the NextGen Bus Plan. Most of the line merged with a restructured Line 2 (relocated from Downtown LA to Expo Park/USC) with the exception of Montana Av. Line 200 at one point ran further north via Echo Park Bl replacing an old portion of Line 33; LADOT DASH Pico Union now provides service to Echo Park Bl.

=== 201 – Koreatown – Atwater Village – Glendale via Silver Lake Bl, Brunswick Ave, and Chevy Chase Dr ===
Line 201 was discontinued on June 27, 2021, as Metro continued the 2nd phase for the NextGen Bus Plan and also due to low ridership. Alternatives to this line include; Metro Lines 92, 94, 180, 182, 217 and 603 (now Line 93); Glendale Beeline 4; new Metro Micro (transit on-demand) service within Silver Lake, Los Feliz, and Glendale areas.

=== 203 – Los Feliz – Griffith Observatory via Vermont Ave ===
Line 203 was replaced by LADOT DASH Los Feliz. Portions of Line 203 was replaced with Line 204 via Vermont Ave.

=== 208 – Beachwood Drive ===
Line 208 was replaced in 1995 by LADOT DASH Beachwood Canyon. Formerly the eastern portion of Line 217 which was split in mid 1980s.

=== 214 – Harbor Freeway Station – Artesia Transit Center via Broadway and Main St (Loop) ===
Line 214 was cancelled in December 2010 due to a budget crisis; nearby alternatives include Lines 45 (now Line 127) on Broadway, 52/352 (now Line 51) on Avalon Bl, and Torrance Transit Line 1 (on Figueroa St).

=== 220 – Beverly Center – Culver City – Marina Del Rey – LAX via Robertson Bl and Culver Bl ===
Line 220 was renumbered to Line 17 (now Line 617) in June 2016. The line went as far south as LAX via Culver Bl, Pershing Dr, and Imperial Hwy. Portions of the line became Line 625 which was then discontinued in late 2020 in favor of Metro Micro.

=== 225 – LAX City Bus Center – Redondo Beach – Palos Verdes Peninsula – San Pedro via Aviation Bl, Prospect Ave, and Palos Verdes Dr N ===
Line 225 was transferred to the same number line to the Palos Verdes Peninsula Transit Authority {PVPTA} in June 2006. Before December 21, 2003, the route traveled to LAX City Bus Center before being shortened to Redondo Beach.

=== 226 – Redondo Beach – Rancho Palos Verdes – San Pedro via Palos Verdes Dr W ===
Line 226 was transferred to the same number line to the Palos Verdes Peninsula Transit Authority {PVPTA} in June 2006.

=== 228 – Studio City – Sun Valley via Coldwater Canyon Ave and Lankershim Bl ===
Line 228 was replaced by Line 167 on Coldwater Canyon and an extension of Line 166 (now Line 224) on Lankershim Bl in June 1995.

=== 239 – Encino – Northridge – Sylmar via White Oak Ave and Rinaldi St ===
Line 239 was canceled after June 27, 2021, as Metro was restructuring its network for the 2nd phase of the NextGen Bus Plan. The majority of Line 239 was merged with Line 237 except the Louise Ave segment west of Balboa Bl. Line 236 was rerouted to replace Line 239 segment east of Balboa Bl to Sylmar.

=== 245 – UCLA West Valley Medical Center – Warner Center – Chatsworth Station via Valley Circle Bl, Mulholland Dr, and Topanga Canyon Bl ===
Line 245 was canceled after June 27, 2021, as Metro was restructuring its network for the 2nd phase of the NextGen Bus Plan. The majority of Line 245 was replaced by an extension of the new Line 150. Line 245 once ran as far west to UCLA West Valley Medical Center which later it was truncated to Warner Center, while Line 645 (now part of Line 169's extension) replaced the portion between Warner Center and UCLA West Valley Medical Center.

=== 247 – Harbor Gateway Transit Center – San Pedro via Avalon Bl, Harbor Bl, and 7th St ===
Line 247 was canceled on June 26, 2011, due to a budget crisis; Lines 205 and 450 (now the extension of the J Line) replaced the Harbor Bl and 7st segments while Line 246 replaced the remainder portion. It was originally Line 447 before opening of J Line in December 2009.

=== 250 – Boyle Heights – LA General Medical Hospital via Boyle Ave, and State St ===
Line 250 was discontinued in December 2003 and was replaced Lines 251, 254 (now defunct), 605, and 620 (later Line 106, now Line 74); and LADOT DASH Boyle Heights/East LA.

=== 252 – Lynwood – Huntington Park – El Sereno – Montecito Heights via Soto St and Mercury Ave ===
Line 252 was canceled on June 27, 2021, as Metro continued restructuring its network for the 2nd phase of the NextGen Bus Plan. Line 251 replaced Line 252 south of Marengo St. New Line 182 replaced Line 252 between Montecito Heights and Rose Hills Transit Center (Huntington/Monterey); while service south of Huntington Dr was replaced by LADOT DASH El Sereno/City Terrace and Metro Bus Line 665.

=== 253 – Boyle Heights – LA General Medical Hospital via Evergreen Ave ===
Line 253 was discontinued in December 2003 and was replaced Lines 251, 254 (now defunct), 605, and 620 (later Line 106, now Line 74); and LADOT DASH Boyle Heights/East LA.

=== 254 – LA General Medical Hospital – Boyle Heights – 103rd/Watts Towers Station – Willowbrook/Rosa Parks Station – LA Southwest College via Lorena Ave, Boyle Ave, Santa Fe Ave, and 120th St ===
Line 254 was discontinued on December 13, 2020, due to low ridership and the first phrase of the NextGen Bus Plan. Service alternatives in this area: Metro Line 55 (Compton Av), Line 251 (Pacific Bl, Soto St), and replaced by MicroTransit which serves in the Watts/Willowbrook areas where the line was running (Anzac Ave and Grape St). Portions of Line 254 on 120th St were replaced with Line 53; LADOT DASH Watts, and The Link – Willowbrook. Alternatives between LA General Medical Hospital and Rowan / Dozier can be provided by LADOT DASH Boyle Heights/East LA and El Sereno/City Terrace.

=== 255 – Highland Park – East LA via Rowan Ave ===
Line 255 was replaced sometime in late-2006 to early-2007 by Line 46 (later Line 252, now Line 182), El Sol, and DASH Boyle Heights/East LA and Lincoln Heights-Chinatown.

=== 256 – Commerce – Cal State LA – Highland Park Station – Pasadena – Altadena – Sierra Madre Villa Station via Eastern Ave, Ave 64, Hill Ave, and Washington Bl ===
Since its inception to June 2021, Line 256 ran between City of Commerce (Eastern/Union Pacific) to Altadena via Cal State LA, Highland Park, and Pasadena with minor route changes as time passed. In June 2021 as part of the NextGen Bus Plan, Line 256 was restructured heavily in the Pasadena area terminating in Sierra Madre Villa Station instead of Altadena. In December 2021, Commerce Transit Line 200 took over operations of Line 256 south of CSULA to Commerce. In June 2023, Line 256 was further shortened to Highland Park Station from CSULA. Line 665's extension took over a portion of Line 256 between Rose Hill and CSULA on Eastern Ave while Metro Micro covered the remainder on Collis Av. Since then, Line 256 only ran between Highland Park A Line Station and Sierra Madre Villa A Line Station during the final 18 months of service until it was transferred to Pasadena Transit as Line 33 on December 15, 2024.

=== 259 – South Gate – El Sereno via Eastern Ave, Fremont Ave, and Templeton St ===
Line 259 was discontinued north of Commonwealth Ave and replaced with Line 258 south of Commonwealth Ave and LADOT DASH City Terrace/El Sereno Shuttle on Templeton St on December 18, 2005.

=== 262 – South Pasadena – South Gate via Garfield Ave ===
Line 262 was replaced by Montebello Transit (now known as Montebello Bus Lines) Line 30 on December 30, 2001. The bus line number may have a chance to come back for the proposal of the NextGen Bus Plan, but it will not be the same version as the original as it will replace portions of Line 62.

=== 264 – Altadena – Pasadena – Montebello/City Of Hope via San Gabriel Bl and Duarte Rd ===
Line 264 once ran as far as The Shops At Montebello until June 2003 when it was rerouted to Duarte replacing Line 188, while Metro Lines 487 and 287; and Montebello Bus Lines Line 20 replaced most of Line 264 south of Colorado Bl. Line 264 was then canceled on June 27, 2021, as Metro was restructuring its network for the 2nd phase of the NextGen Bus Plan. New Metro Micro covers portions of Line 264 north of Sierra Madre Villa Station. Service on Duarte Rd is provided by Arcadia Transit's Blue Route between Santa Anita and Baldwin Aves. Metro A Line also covers portions of Line 264 between Myrtle and Highland Aves.

=== 270 – Monrovia – El Monte – Whittier – Santa Fe Springs – Norwalk – Cerritos via Peck Rd, Santa Fe Springs Rd, Orr & Day Rd, and Studebaker Rd ===
Line 270 was transferred to Foothill Transit north of El Monte station to Monrovia (now extended to Arcadia A Line Station). Norwalk Transit operates the route south of El Monte station to Norwalk C Line Station as Route 7 in June 2016. Line 270 used to run as far south to Los Cerritos Center until it was truncated to Norwalk C Line Station in 1998 with Long Beach Transit Routes 172 and 173 taking over operation on the segment.

=== 271 – Whittier – Hawaiian Gardens via Broadway and Pioneer Bl ===
Line 271 was replaced with rerouted Line 270 (later transferred to Foothill Transit and Norwalk Transit on Broadway) and Line 462 (later Line 362, now Line 62) extension from Pioneer/Rosecrans to Hawaiian Gardens.

=== 274 – Avocado Heights – West Covina – Glendora via Puente Ave and Citrus Ave ===
Line 274 was transferred to Foothill Transit in the late 1980s. Foothill Transit retained Line 274 south of Plaza West Covina to Avocado Heights (now extended to Whittier) via Puente Ave while Foothill Transit Line 281 took over operations north of Plaza West Covina to Glendora via Citrus Ave.

=== 275 – Pico Rivera – Whittier – Cerritos via South St, Valley View Ave, and Carmenita Rd ===
Line 275 was replaced by Norwalk Transit Line 8 in June 2007 which was later discontinued in 2012 due to low ridership. (Some portions of Line 8 became part of Line 7).

=== 276 – Industry – La Puente – West Covina – San Dimas – Azusa via Puente Ave and San Dimas Bl ===
Line 276 was transferred to Foothill Transit in the late 1980s. Foothill Transit Line 276 is now split with Foothill Transit Line 281 south of Eastland Center to Industry (now extended to Puente Hills Mall) and Foothill Transit Line 284 north of Eastland Center to Glendora.

=== 280 – Azusa – Puente Hills Mall via Azusa Ave ===
Line 280 was transferred to Foothill Transit in the late 1980s.

=== 290 – Olive View Medical Center – Sunland via Foothill Bl ===
Line 290 was merged back into Line 90 in June 2013; it began operating in June 2007 to replace Lines 90 and 91. Then in June 2021, the 90 was rerouted to North Hollywood (B and G Line Stations) covering a portion of Line 222. While Line 90 between Sunland and Olive View Medical Center was replaced by Line 690, which would run nearly identical as the former Line 290 route.

=== 291 – La Verne – Pomona via Garey Ave and Foothill Bl ===
Line 291 was transferred to Foothill Transit in December 1988 by the former LACTC (Los Angeles County Transportation Commission, now part of Metro) when the former SCRTD (Southern California Rapid Transit Authority, predecessor of Metro) announced cuts that would adversely impact services in San Gabriel Valley.

=== 292 – Sylmar Station – Burbank Station via N Glenoaks Bl ===
Line 292 was merged back into Line 92 in December 2017 due to popular demand; it began operating in June 2007 to replace Line 92.

=== 293 – Claremont – Pomona via Indian Hill Bl and Reservoir St ===
Line 293 was transferred to Foothill Transit in December 1988 by the former LACTC (Los Angeles County Transportation Commission, now part of Metro) when the former SCRTD (Southern California Rapid Transit Authority, predecessor of Metro) announced cuts that would adversely impact services in San Gabriel Valley.

== 300–399 ==
As of 13 December 2020, all Metro Limited lines except for Line 344 have been discontinued.

=== 302 – Pacific Palisades – Westwood – Downtown LA via Sunset Bl Limited ===
Line 302 operated alongside Line 2 between Downtown LA and Westwood, (used to be Pacific Palisades along with Local Line 2 until December 2017 when Shuttle Line 602 was established). This line was suspended in April 2020 due to COVID-19, though was later discontinued permanently on December 13, 2020, as part of the NextGen Plan. This line began operating its service since the mid-1990s.

=== 304 – Santa Monica – Downtown LA via Santa Monica Bl Limited ===
Line 304 operated along with Line 4 and was one of the few local limited lines that ran daily before the line was replaced by Metro Rapid Line 704 in June 2007. Line 704 was then discontinued in September 2021.

=== 305 – UCLA – West Hollywood – Imperial/Wilmington Station Limited ===
Line 305 was discontinued on June 17, 2012, after over 40 years in service, providing a route for passengers that would take them to UCLA from South Los Angeles. Line 305 service on San Vicente Bl was replaced with Line 30/330 (now mostly defunct with a portion retained by a rerouted Line 16). The majority of the route was replaced by several lines in the south Los Angeles area. This line began its service in the mid-1990s. This is the only limited line to not have a local counterpart.

=== 310 – Hollywood – Wilshire/Western Station – South Bay Galleria Transit Center via Vine St and Crenshaw Bl Limited ===
Line 310 operated along with Line 210 via rush-hour service before the line was replaced by Metro Rapid Line 710 in February 2004 (between Wilshire/Western Station and South Bay Galleria). Line 710 was later discontinued on December 13, 2020. Line 310 started its service in the mid-1990s.

=== 311 – LAX – Bell Gardens – Norwalk Station – Whittier via Florence Ave and Leffingwell Rd Limited ===
Line 311 was discontinued in June 2016. It had been operating with Line 111 since the mid-1990s until the line was replaced with the now-defunct Rapid Line 711 in June 2003, which it operated along with Line 111 between Inglewood and Bell Gardens until it was reverted in December 2010.

=== 312 – Hollywood – Inglewood – Hawthorne via La Brea Ave and Prairie Ave Limited ===
Line 312 operated alongside Line 212 between Hawthorne/Lennox station and Hollywood/Vine station. This line was suspended in April 2020 due to COVID-19, though later discontinued permanently on December 13, 2020, as part of the NextGen Plan. This line started its service in April 2004.

=== 315 – LAX – Norwalk via Manchester Ave, Manchester Bl, and Firestone Bl Limited ===
Line 315 was replaced by the Metro Rapid Line 715 (between LAX and Downey) in June 2008 before it was discontinued in December 2010 due to a budget crisis. Line 315 started service in the mid-1990s.

=== 316 – Downtown LA – Century City via 3rd St Limited ===
Line 316 operated alongside lines 16 and 17 along 3rd St between Century City and Downtown Los Angeles. It operated a limited-stop service between Alvarado Street and La Cienega Boulevard and served all local stops on other portions of the line. This line started its service sometime in the mid-1990s until it was suspended in April 2020 due to COVID-19, though later discontinued permanently on December 13, 2020, as part of the NextGen Plan.

=== 317 – Hollywood/Vine Station – West L.A. Transit Center via Fairfax Ave and Hollywood Bl Limited ===
Line 317 began its service in December 2004 operated along with Line 217, and had services throughout the weekday before the line was replaced by Metro Rapid Line 717 in June 2005, which then merged with the Metro Rapid Line 780 (later went defunct in June 2021) in June 2006.

=== 318 – Wilshire Center – Downtown LA – Brea Mall via 6th St – Whittier Bl – La Habra Bl Limited ===
Line 318 was renumbered from Line 470 in October 1998 when the express portion of the route (along CA-60 between Soto St and Garfield Bl) was eliminated in favor of a limited-stop routing alongside local Line 18. It had daily services before the line was replaced by Metro Rapid Line 720 between Montebello (later shorted to Commerce in 2004, then DTLA in June 2021) and City West, in June 2000 – one of two original routes. Montebello Bus Lines Line 10 replaced Line 318 east of Garfield Ave to Whittwood Town Center while Line 471 (later Foothill Transit Line 285) covered between Colima Rd and Beach Bl. OC Bus Line 29 (later OC Bus Line 129) covered the La Habra Bl alignment of the former Line 318.

=== 320 – Downtown LA – Santa Monica via Wilshire Bl Limited ===
Line 320 operated along with Line 20 via services between Monday and Saturday before the line was replaced by Metro Rapid Line 720 in June 2000 – one of two original Rapid routes.

=== 322 – Downtown LA – Beverly Hills – Brentwood – Santa Monica via Wilshire Bl and San Vicente Ave Limited ===
Line 322 operated along with now-defunct Line 22 via rush-hour service in peak directions before the line was replaced by Metro Rapid Line 720 in June 2000 – one of two original Rapid routes.

=== 328 – Century City – Downtown LA via Olympic Bl Limited ===
Line 328 operated alongside Line 28 and was one of the few local limited lines that operated on all-day weekdays before the line was replaced by Metro Rapid Line 728 in December 2007. Line 728 was later discontinued on December 13, 2020.

=== 330 – West Hollywood – Pico-Rimpau – Downtown Los Angeles – Rowan/Dozier via Pico Bl and 1st St Limited ===
Line 330 was suspended in April 2020 due to COVID-19, though later discontinued permanently on December 13, 2020, as part of the NextGen Plan. It had been operating with Lines 30/31 since December 2005 before the line was replaced with the now-defunct Rapid Line 730 in June 2008, in which it operated alongside Line 30 until Line 330 was revived in June 2012.

=== 333 – Downtown LA – Venice – Santa Monica via Venice Bl Limited ===
Line 333 operated alongside Line 33 and was one of the local limited lines that were operated daily as well as throughout the evening before the line was replaced by Metro Rapid Line 733 in June 2010. This limited line was still the only one in the system that operated during owl periods. Line 733 was later discontinued in September 2021.

=== 335 – Downtown L.A. – Washington/Fairfax Transit Hub via Washington Bol Limited ===
Line 335 operated along with Line 35 via rush hour service before the line was discontinued on June 26, 2011, due to a budget crisis. Line 335 began service in December 2007 along with the local counterpart Line 35 when Line 68 was shortened in DTLA and Line 368 was replaced by now-defunct Line 770 on Cesar E. Chavez Av.

=== 340 – Downtown L.A. – Hawthorne Station – South Bay Galleria via King Bl and Hawthorne Bl Limited ===
Line 340 operated along with Line 40 via rush hour service before the line was replaced by Metro Rapid 740 in December 2004. Line 740 was later discontinued on December 13, 2020. Line 340 began its service in June 2001.

=== 345 – South LA – Downtown LA – Lincoln Heights via Broadway Limited ===
Line 345 operated along with Line 45 & former Line 46 via rush hour service before the line was replaced by Metro Rapid Line 745 (between Downtown LA and Harbor Freeway C & J Line Station) in December 2002. Line 745 was later discontinued on December 13, 2020.

=== 350 – Cypress Park – Huntington Park – Lynwood via Soto St and State St Limited ===
Line 350 operated along with Lines 251 and 252 via rush hour service before the line was replaced by Metro Rapid 751 in June 2004. Line 751 was later discontinued on December 13, 2020. This version of Line 350 began operating in June 2003.

=== 350 – Downtown LA – CSUDH via Central Ave Limited ===
Line 350 operated along with Line 53 via rush hour service in peak direction before the line was replaced by Metro Rapid 753 (then was later defunct in December 2010) in June 2008. This version of Line 350 began operating in December 2006.

=== 351/352 – Wilshire Center – Compton/Harbor Gateway Transit Center via 7th St, San Pedro St, and Avalon Bl Limited ===
Lines 352/351 operated alongside Line 52 and Line 51 on San Pedro St and Avalon Bl towards Harbor Gateway Transit Center. Line 352 was reverted to the former Line 351 in June 2016 which ran alongside Line 51 towards Compton station, then Line 351 discontinued altogether on December 13, 2020 (though was suspended earlier in April due to COVID-19); Line 352 began its service in June 2001 running with 52, whereas the 351 originally ran with the 51 prior to its cancellation in the early 1990s with the opening of Metro A Line.

=== 353 – Woodland Hills – North Hollywood via Roscoe Bl and Lankershim Bl Limited ===
Line 353 was renumbered from Line 418 in June 2005 when the express portion of the route was eliminated due to low ridership and accommodation from the Metro B Line. It operated alongside Line 152. This line was suspended in April 2020 due to COVID-19, though was later discontinued permanently on December 13, 2020, as part of the NextGen Plan. In June 2021, Line 152 was realigned to Lankershim Bl instead of Vineland Ave paralleling the former Line 353 route.

=== 354 – Hollywood – Athens via Vermont Ave Limited ===
Line 354 operated along with Line 204 via rush hour service before the line was replaced by Metro Rapid Line 754 in December 2002.

=== 355 – Downtown LA – Willowbrook/Rosa Parks Station via Compton Ave Limited ===
Line 355 operated alongside Line 55 on Compton Ave. This line was suspended in April 2020 due to COVID-19, though was later discontinued permanently on December 13, 2020, as part of the NextGen Plan. The line began its service in December 2006 to provide patrons as an alternate route to the often-crowded Metro A Line.

=== 357 – Hollywood – LA Southwest College – Willowbrook/Rosa Parks Station via Western Ave and 120th St Limited ===
Line 357 operated along with Line 207 via Monday through Saturday Service. The line was replaced by Metro Rapid Line 757 (between Hollywood and Western/Imperial Hwy, but rerouted to Crenshaw C Line Station) in December 2005. Line 757 was later discontinued in June 2021.

=== 358 – Los Angeles – Lynwood – Paramount via Alameda St Limited (First Generation) ===
This version of Line 358 ran primarily along Alameda St via rush-hour services and with limited-stop services between Downtown Los Angeles and Paramount. A portion of the route near Downtown Los Angeles would later be occupied by Line 58 when later went defunct in June 2005.

=== 358 – Marina del Rey – Culver City – Pico Rivera via Slauson Ave Limited (Second Generation) ===
This version of Line 358 which ran alongside Line 108 along Slauson Ave was suspended in April 2020 due to COVID-19, though later discontinued permanently on December 13, 2020, as part of the NextGen Plan. The line began its service in June 2005.

=== 360 – Downtown LA – Compton – Long Beach via Long Beach Bl Limited ===
Line 360 operated along with Line 60 via rush hour service before the line was replaced by Metro Rapid Line 760 in June 2007. Line 760 was later discontinued on December 13, 2020, Line 360 began operating in June 2003. Prior to the revival, Line 360 operated during the latter part of the RTD era before the merger in 1993, though was discontinued when Metro A Line started operation.

=== 361 – Altadena – Pasadena – Lynwood – Artesia Station via Atlantic Bl and Fair Oaks Ave Limited ===
Line 361 operated along with Line 260 via rush hour service in peak direction before the line was replaced by Metro Rapid Line 762 in June 2008. Line 762 was later discontinued on December 13, 2020. Prior to that, Line 361 replaced the express Line 483 in June 2003.

=== 362 – Hawaiian Gardens – Cerritos – Norwalk- Santa Fe Springs – Los Angeles via Telegraph Rd and Pioneer Bl Limited ===
Line 362 was renumbered from Line 462 in October 1998 when the express portion of the route (along Interstate 5 between Lorena St and Eastern Ave) was eliminated in favor of a limited-stop routing along Olympic Bl and Telegraph Rd. In December 2005, the line was renumbered again to Line 62 (which may become Line 262 due to the NextGen Bus Plan) to add more stops along the route.

=== 363 – North Hollywood Station – Canoga Park via Sherman Way and Victory Bl Limited ===
Line 363 was renumbered from Line 426 in June 2005 when the express portion of the route was eliminated due to low ridership and accommodation from the Metro B Line. It operated alongside Line 163 until June 2012, when it was renumbered to Line 162 to add more stops along the route.

=== 364 – Chatsworth Station – Sun Valley via Nordhoff St and Osborne St Limited ===
Line 364 operated alongside Line 166 on Nordhoff S-Osborne St since its inception in December 2006. This line was suspended in April 2020 due to COVID-19, though later discontinued permanently on December 13, 2020, as part of the NextGen Plan.

=== 366 – Montebello Station – East L.A. – Wilshire/Western Station – Koreatown via E Olympic Bl and 8th St Limited ===
Line 366 operated along with Line 66 via rush hour service in peak directions before it was cancelled in June 2010; this line began service in June 2003. Line 366 was discontinued in June 2010.

=== 368 – The Shops At Montebello – Downtown L.A. – Washington/Fairfax Transit Hub via Cesar E. Chavez Ave and Washington Bl Limited ===
Line 368 operated alongside now-defunct Line 68 via rush-hour service before the line was replaced by Metro Rapid Line 770 (now defunct as of June 2021) on Cesar E. Chavez Ave while the new Line 335 (now defunct as of June 2011) replaced Line 368 on Washington Bl in December 2007. This line began its service in December 2005.

=== 370 – Downtown L.A. – El Monte station via Marengo St and Garvey Ave Limited ===
Line 370 operated along with Line 70 via rush-hour service before the line was replaced by Metro Rapid Line 770 in December 2007; this local limited line began its service in December 2002. Line 770 was later discontinued June 2021.

=== 376 – El Monte station – Downtown L.A. – Valley Bl Limited ===
Line 376 operated along with Line 76 via rush hour service in peak directions before the line was canceled in June 2008; it began operating in June 2004.

=== 378 – South Arcadia – Downtown L.A. via Mission Dr, Las Tunas Dr and Live Oak Ave Limited ===
Line 378 operated alongside line 78 via rush-hour services in peak directions before December 13, 2020, it was once again canceled due to low ridership and the first phase of the NextGen Bus Plan. Limited Line 378 was canceled in June 2002 due to a lack of travel savings but was revived in December 2004.

=== 379 – Arcadia – Downtown L.A. via Mission Rd and Huntington Dr Limited ===
Line 379 operated alongside now-defunct Line 79 via rush-hour service in peak directions before it was canceled in June 2002 due to a lack of travel savings from its local counterpart.

=== 380 – Hollywood/Vine Station – Altadena via Hollywood Bl, Colorado Bl, and Lake Ave Limited ===
Line 380 operated along with Lines 180 & 181 via rush-hour service before the line was replaced by Metro Rapid Line 780 in December 2004, which then merged from the Metro Rapid Line 717 in June 2006 to extend the route to Washington/Fairfax Transit Hub; this line began its service in December 2002. Line 780 was later discontinued in June 2021.

=== 381 – Eagle Rock – Downtown L.A. – Harbor Freeway Station via Figueroa St Limited ===
Line 381 operated along with Line 81 until the line was cancelled in December 2008; this line began its service in December 2002.

=== 394 – Sylmar/San Fernando – Downtown LA via San Fernando Rd Limited ===
Line 394 operated along with Line 94 and was one of the few lines that ran operated daily before the line was replaced by Metro Rapid Line 794 in June 2008; This line began it service in December 1996. Line 794 was later discontinued June 2021.

== 600–699 ==
=== 603 – Glendale Galleria – Grand/LATTC A Line Station via San Fernando Rd, Rampart Ave, and Hoover St ===
Line 603 was one of the several lines to be implemented under the Consent Decree Metro Bus Pilot Project Master Plan. Line 603 began service in February 1998. Line 603 remained its route the same during its lifetime with few minor route changes over the years. Line 603 was renumbered as Line 93 on June 22, 2025 (coincidentally Line 603 replaced a segment of the original Line 93 on Allesandro St back in 2003).

=== 607 – Inglewood Shuttle (Loop) ===
Line 607 was cancelled on December 13, 2020, due to low utilization. Alternative services in the area include Lines 102 (Stocker St/La Tijera Bl), 108 (Slauson Av), 110 (Centinela Av), 210 (Crenshaw Bl), and 212 (La Brea Av). This line began its service in June 2004 to replace the western segment of the former Line 107.

=== 608 – Crenshaw Connection (Loop) ===
Line 608 was cancelled in December 2010; alternatives include Lines 40/740, 102, 105/705, 206, 209 and DASH Crenshaw and Leimert Park/Slauson.

=== 612 – Willowbrook/Rosa Parks Station – Huntington Park Shuttle Loop via Santa Fe Ave, Florence Ave, and Otis Ave ===
Line 612 was discontinued on December 13, 2020, due to low ridership and it was replaced by Metro's new MicroTransit on-demand service. Transit alternatives include Metro Line 55 (Compton Av), Line 60 (Long Beach Bl), Line 111 (Florence Av), Line 115 (Firestone Bl), Line 117 (Tweedy St/Century Bl), Line 251 (Pacific Bl/Soto St), Lines 260/261 (Atlantic Bl), Line 611 (Santa Ana St/Seville Av), and Metro A Line rail service. This line was named S-2 in the plan, but officially started service in 2003. This shuttle route replaced portions of Lines 56, 112, and 119 with additional modifications to replace the former Line 681 in December 2005.

=== 620 – LA General Medical Hospital Loop via Cesar E. Chavez Ave, Forest Ave, Wabash Ave, Evergreen Ave, Mott St, and 1st St ===
Line 620 was renumbered to Line 106 (become Line 74 in December 2025) in June 2016 with discontinued service with the streets above. Replacement services along the discontinued segment include Lines 30 (later shortened), 68 (later Line 70), 71 (later rerouted Line 106), and 770 (now defunct). From June 2016 until June 2021, Line 106 operated on segments of former Line 620 that were overlapped with other lines, since then almost the entire legacy Line 620 segment had been eliminated once when Line 106 was rerouted into Downtown LA. This shuttle service began in April 1991.

=== 622 – Norwalk – El Segundo – C Line Owl Service Shuttle ===
This version of Line 622 was an owl shuttle service as an alternate to the Metro C Line before it was cancelled in June 2007. Replacement services include Lines 40 and 117 via LAX City Bus Center Owl Route and Century/Tweedy Bls respectively. This is not to be confused with a different version of Line 622 that ran as a shuttle route between Burbank Airport & Sun Valley.

=== 622 – Burbank Airport – Sun Valley Shuttle via Glenoaks Ave and Tuxford St ===
This version of Line 622 was a shuttle that ran from Burbank Airport RITC to Sun Valley via Hollywood Way, Glenoaks Bl, and Tuxford St to make connections between Line 152 & 222. This version of Line 622 was merged with Line 222 in September 2021. This Route began service on July 18, 2021. This is not to be confused with a different version of Line 622 that ran as an owl shuttle for the Metro C Line between Aviation / LAX and Norwalk.

=== 625 – Aviation/Imperial Station – LAX Shuttle – Superior Court Building ===
Line 625 was replaced by Metro's new MicroTransit on December 13, 2020. Metro Lines 120, 232, and Beach Cities Transit Line 109 are also service parts of this line. This line began its service in 1995 as a feeder to the Metro C Line, this line replaced a portion of the former Line 220 route.

=== 626 – LAX City Bus Center – C Line Shuttle ===
Line 626 was merged into Line 625 (which was later discontinued on December 13, 2020) in December 2010. This was a clockwise route that served El Segundo, near L.A.X. This line began its service in 1995 as a feeder to the Metro C Line.

=== 627 – El Segundo/Nash Metro C Line Station Shuttle ===
Line 627 was a weekday rush hour clockwise shuttle service that connects the Aerospace Corporation, the Metro C Line (now part of K Line), and the Wiseburn School District. The line was then replaced by Metro lines 125, 232, 625, LADOT Commuter Express line 574, and Torrance line 8. This line began its service in 1995 as a feeder to the Metro C Line.

=== 628 – Douglas/Rosecrans Metro C Line Station Shuttle ===
Line 628 was a weekday rush hour shuttle service that served the cities of El Segundo and Manhattan Beach via the Metro C Line (now part of K Line). The line was then replaced by Metro Lines 126, 232, Commuter Express line 574, and Torrance line 8. This line began its service in 1995 as a feeder to the Metro C Line

=== 631 – Lakewood C Line Shuttle via Rancho Los Amigos and Kaiser Permanente Bellflower ===
Line 631 was a shuttle service in the Bellflower area via Imperial Highway and Lakewood Bl before it was canceled on June 29, 2003, in favor of Line 117's extension. Portions of the line are provided by Metro Lines 117, 120, 258, 265, and 266; Long Beach Transit Route 22, and DowneyLink Southeast Route. This line began its service in 1995 as a feeder to the Metro C Line, and to replace the underutilized segments of Line 117 on Garfield/Main.

=== 632 – Union Station – Atlantic Station (Eastside Extension Shuttle) ===
Line 632 was replaced by the Eastside Extension of the L Line; it only made stops near train stations for a short term before the L Line (now part of E Line) Extension started service.

=== 634 – Sylmar Station – LA Mission College via Hubbard St Shuttle ===
Line 634 began operating in June 2006, and was later merged into Line 230 on June 26, 2011. On July 31, 2021, it was transferred to LADOT as the DASH Sylmar though Line 230 remained operation on Hubbard St until December 2021 when it was shortened to Sylmar Station.

=== 645 – Warner Center – UCLA West Valley Medical Center via Mulholland Dr and Valley Circle Bl ===
Line 645 was split from Line 245 in June 2005 and later merged into Line 169 in June 2014.

=== 646 – Carson / Wilmington / San Pedro Shuttle ===
Line 646 was a shuttle operating between Avalon / Carson Plaza and Pacific / 21st St in San Pedro. It provided a timed-transfer with Metro Line 45 at Avalon / Carson Plaza between midnight and 4:00 AM. The service was unique because passengers were allowed to deviate 1/4 mile radius of the route for drop off's & pick-ups before it was canceled in June 2004. Currently the closest alternative to this shuttle is available with Line 246 which operates 24 hours a day.

=== 656 – Hollywood – Panorama City Owl ===
Line 656 was a route that ran between Hollywood & Panorama City via Highland Ave, Cahuenga Bl, Lankershim Bl, Sherman Way & Van Nuys Bl. It operated as an owl route for Line 156 (later for Line 237 in 2016, and then briefly for Line 222 in June 2021). This route used to run as far as Vermont / Sunset Station when it began service. Line 656 was discontinued in September 2021, and was replaced by Line 162 on Sherman Way, 224 on Lankershim & Cahuenga, and 233 on Van Nuys Bl.

=== 681 – 103rd St/Watts A Line Station – Huntington Park via Pacific Bl and Santa Fe Ave Shuttle ===
Line 681 began its service in June 2003, and replaced the southern portion of Line 251 south of Florence Ave via Pacific Bl to 103rd St/Watts Towers A Line Station. It was then extended the route from Florence Ave and Pacific Bl to the Metro A Line Slauson Station in June 2004. The route was canceled in December 2005, with portions of the line covered by Lines 251 and 612 (now defunct).

=== 684 – Downtown Pomona – Cal Poly Pomona – Diamond Bar – Brea Mall via Holt Bl and Diamond Bar Bl ===
Line 684 was the merger of the eastern legs of former Metro Express Lines 490 and 484. Line 684 was canceled in September 2007 and was replaced by Foothill Transit Line 286. Although, Line 286 dropped destinations to Cal Poly Pomona in favor of a more direct route on Mission Bl and Diamond Bar Bl.

=== 685 – Glassell Park – Glendale Community College via Verdugo St ===
Line 685 was canceled after June 27, 2021, due to low ridership as Metro was restructuring its network for the 2nd phase of the NextGen Bus Plan. New Metro Micro service replaces Line 685. This line was a successor of the former Line 85 branch, which was implemented in December 2006.

=== 686 – Altadena – Pasadena via Allen Ave ===
Line 686 was canceled effective June 23, 2024, due to restructuring its network for the NextGen Bus Plan, and was replaced by Line 267's extension. This line was a successor of the former Line 401 which served the local segment since the Metro L Line (now part of A Line) opening in June 2003 .

=== 687 – Altadena – Pasadena – South Pasadena – San Marino via Los Robles Ave ===
Line 687 was canceled after June 27, 2021, as Metro was restructuring its network for the 2nd phase of the NextGen Bus Plan. New Line 662 replaced portions of Line 687 on Los Robles Ave between Washington and Colorado Bls along with the new Metro Micro service. This line started service in June 2003 when it replaced the old Line 260 segment on Los Robles Ave (Line 260 was rerouted to Fair Oaks Av) between Altadena and San Marino until it was shortened to Fillmore Station in December 2004.

=== 694 – Pomona – Chino via Holt Bl and Central Ave Express Shuttle ===
Line 694 was a short Express Shuttle route that started from Indian Hill Bl and Holt Bl California Institution for Men Jail in Chino. This line only ran on Sundays. Line 694 was canceled in 1997 due to low ridership, also by the former LACTC (Los Angeles County Transportation Commission, now part of Metro) when the former SCRTD (Southern California Rapid Transit Authority, the predecessor of Metro) announced that it adversely impacted services in San Gabriel Valley.

== See also ==
- List of former Metro Express routes
- List of current Metro Local routes
