= List of former Metro Express routes =

Former Los Angeles Metro Metro Express routes in Los Angeles County, California.

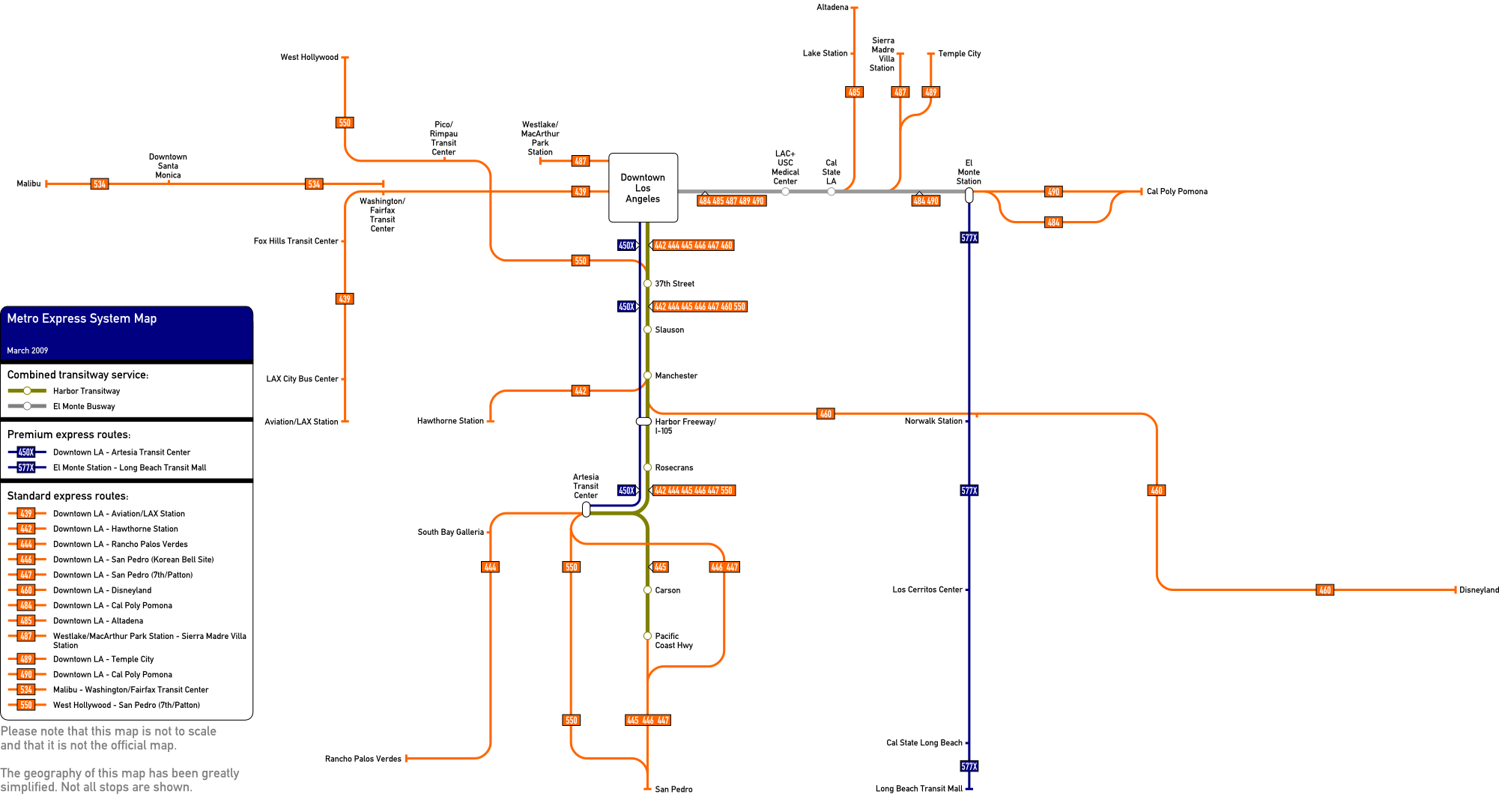
Former Metro Express system map

== 400-405: via Pasadena Freeway ==
=== 401 - Downtown L.A. - Pasadena - Altadena via Allen Ave Express ===
Line 401 provided service from Downtown Los Angeles to Pasadena via the Pasadena Freeway. Line 401 ran along Arroyo Pkwy, Colorado Bl, and Allen Ave. Line 401 was canceled as a result of the opening of the former Metro L Line (now part of Metro A Line) and was replaced by Line 686 between Pasadena and Altadena. Later Line 686 became part of Line 267 extension in June 2024.

=== 402 - Downtown L.A. - Pasadena Park-n-Ride Express ===
Line 402 was a rush hour-only express line terminating at a park-n-ride facility in Old Town Pasadena near Colorado Bl and Fair Oaks Ave. It was canceled in June 2001.

== 406-409: via Glendale Freeway ==
=== 406 - Downtown L.A. - Sunland via Pennsylvania Ave Express ===
Line 406 was a rush hour-only express for Line 90, traveling on the Golden State Freeway (Interstate 5) and Glendale Freeway (SR 2) before exiting SR 2 at Verdugo Bl in La Cañada Flintridge and joining Line 90 for the remainder of the route to Sunland. It was replaced by LADOT Commuter Express 409 in June 1995.

=== 407 - Downtown L.A. - Sunland via La Crescenta Ave Express ===
Line 407 was a rush hour-only express for Line 91, traveling on the Golden State Freeway (Interstate 5) and Glendale Freeway (SR 2) before exiting SR 2 at Verdugo Bl in La Cañada Flintridge and joining Line 91 for the remainder of the route to Sunland. It was replaced by LADOT Commuter Express 409 in June 1995.

== 410-419: via Golden State Freeway ==
=== 410 - Downtown L.A. - Sylmar via Glenoaks Bl and Brand Bl Express ===
Line 410 was a rush hour-only express for Line 92, traveling on the Golden State Freeway (Interstate 5) before exiting at Colorado Bl in Glendale and joining Line 92 for the remainder of the route to San Fernando. It was cancelled in June 2003 same as Line 93 (Returned in June 2025).

=== 412 - Downtown L.A. - North Hollywood Express ===
Line 412 was a rush hour-only express for Line 96 when Line 96 traveled to Valley Plaza in North Hollywood. Line 412 traveled on the Golden State Freeway (Interstate 5) and the Ventura Freeway (SR 134) before exiting at Buena Vista St in Burbank and joining Line 96 for the remainder of the route to North Hollywood. It was cancelled in June 1995.

=== 413 - Downtown L.A. - Burbank - North Hollywood - Van Nuys Express ===
Line 413 was transferred to LADOT Commuter Express. It was cancelled in August 1st, 2010 due to low ridership.

=== 418 - Downtown L.A - North Hollywood - Sun Valley - Van Nuys - Canoga Park via Roscoe Ave Express ===
Line 418 was an express counterpart for Line 152. It was renumbered Line 353 in June 2005 (later canceled in December 2020). The express service was canceled in June 2003 when the line was realigned to terminate at North Hollywood station, with the Metro B Line replacing the express service.

=== 419 - Downtown L.A. - Mission Hills - Granada Hills - Chatsworth via Devonshire Ave Express ===
Line 419 was transferred to LADOT Commuter Express.

== 420–429: via Hollywood Freeway ==
=== 420 – Downtown L.A. – North Hollywood – Hollywood Van Nuys – Panorama City – Northridge via Chandler Bl, Van Nuys Bl and Plummer St Express ===
Line 420 was renumbered to Line 156 in June 2000 and later to Line 237 in June 2016. The express service to Downtown LA was canceled in June 1999 when the line was extended to terminate at Vermont/Santa Monica Station, with the Metro B Line replacing the express service. From 1983 to 1986, the line extended to Northridge Fashion Center, but this segment was replaced with Line 167. As of today, Line 237 remains service on Burbank Bl while Lines 222 and 224 (owl) remain service between Hollywood and Universal City where the both segments were formerly provided by Line 420.

=== 421 – Downtown L.A. – North Hollywood – Panorama City - Northridge Express via Universal City Express ===
Line 421 operated alongside Lines 420 and 422 (first generation). Line 421 was eliminated in 1986 (the same time as its sister Line 422 was eliminated). Line 421 was replaced with Line 167 on Plummer St and Line 420 (now Lines 233/761) on Van Nuys Bl; Metro B and G Lines on the express segment.

=== 422 – Downtown L.A. – Panorama City - Northridge Express via Sherman Oaks Express (First Generation) ===
The first generation of Line 422 ran alongside Lines 420 and 421. Unlike Lines 420 and 421, Line 422 continued on the CA-101 Freeway until Van Nuys Bl. This line was eliminated in 1986 (the same time as its sister Line 421 was eliminated).

=== 422 – Thousand Oaks – Warner Center – Downtown L.A. Express (Second Generation) ===
The second generation of Line 422 was originally planned to be operated by Metro before it began service. Due to unknown reason, it has been transferred to LADOT as an LADOT Commuter Express, it has begun service on February 1998. This line is unusual because it operates in a reverse commute route (AM to Thousand Oaks, PM to Downrown LA). This line is a near inverse to Line 423.

=== 423 – Downtown L.A. – Encino – Thousand Oaks Express ===
Line 423 has been operated by LADOT as Commuter Express since 1986. It operated as a Metro line from 1983 to 1986.

=== 424 – Downtown L.A. - Canoga Park – Warner Center – Ventura Bl Local Express ===
Line 424 was renumbered to Line 150 (now split between Line 150 and 240 on Ventura Bl) in June 2000 and realigned to terminate at Universal City Station, with the Metro B Line replacing the express service.

=== 425 – Downtown L.A. - Canoga Park via Ventura Bl Limited Express ===
Line 425 provided express service to Downtown L.A. via Ventura Bl; on Ventura Bl, the service only made limited stops. Replaced by Metro Rapid Line 750 (now Metro Lines 150 and 240, with the Metro B Line replacing the express service.

=== 426 – Downtown L.A. - North Hollywood - Canoga Park via Sherman Way and Wilshire Bl Express ===
Line 426 was renumbered to Line 363 in June 2005 and then Line 162 in June 2012. It was an express counterpart for Line 163 (now merged with Line 162). The express service was canceled in June 2003 (it had been realigned to serve North Hollywood Station in June 2000, and all service was cut back to there three years later, with the Metro B Line replacing the express service).

=== 427 – Downtown L.A. – Warner Center – Canoga Park Express ===
Line 427 was replaced by Metro Rapid Line 750 (now Metro Lines 150 and 240) with the Metro B Line replacing the express service.

=== 427A – Hollywood – Warner Center - Downtown L.A. Express ===
Line 427A was a reverse commute route slightly different from 427 that operated during morning rush hours outbound from Downtown Los Angeles, through Hollywood, to Warner Center, and during afternoon rush hours in reverse. In 1998, it was renumbered as 422, with the route extended to Thousand Oaks, and operations transferred to LADOT as a Commuter Express service.

=== 429 – Downtown L.A. – Westwood/UCLA via Sunset Bl Express ===
Line 429 was a rush hour-only express for Line 2, traveling on the Hollywood Freeway (US 101) before exiting at Sunset Bl in Hollywood and joining Line 2 for the remainder of the route to Westwood, terminating at the corner of Westwood Bl and Wilshire Bl. It was canceled in June 2000, with the Metro B Line replacing the express service.

== 430-439: via Santa Monica Freeway ==
=== 430 - Downtown L.A. - Westwood - Pacific Palisades via Sunset Bl Express ===
Line 430 was transferred to LADOT Commuter Express. The service was cancelled in August 1st, 2010 due to low ridership. Line 430 was replaced between Westwood and Pacific Palisades with Lines 2 and 302, but they were shortened to Westwood in December 2017. The portion between Westwood and Pacific Palisades is now Metro Shuttle Line 602.

=== 431 - Downtown L.A. - Century City - Westwood Express ===
Line 431 was transferred to LADOT Commuter Express.

=== 434 - Union Station - Downtown L.A. - Wahsington/Fairfax Transit Hub - Santa Monica - Malibu Express ===
Line 434 was a full-service line along Pacific Coast Highway between Santa Monica and Malibu with weekday and rush-hour trips to West Los Angeles Transit Center (now Washington/Fairfax Transit Hub) (near the Fairfax Ave exit of Interstate 10) and Downtown Los Angeles via Interstate 10, respectively. The freeway service from Downtown Los Angeles was changed to a limited-stop service line along Venice Bl. Line 434 became Line 534 when the route was shortened to run between Washington / Fairfax Transit Hub and Malibu in December 2005. When Phase 2 of the Metro E Line opened in Santa Monica, the route was shortened further to terminate at Downtown Santa Monica station. Over 6 years, Line 534 was renumbered to Local Line 134 to match with 100-series routes since it now runs more like a local route.

=== 436 - Downtown L.A. - Ocean Park via Venice Bl Express ===
Line 436 was a rush hour-only express for Line 33, traveling on the Santa Monica Freeway (Interstate 10) before exiting at Venice Bl in Palms and joining Line 33 for the remainder of the route to Venice. It was cancelled in June 2001.

=== 437 - Downtown L.A. - Marina Del Rey Express ===
Line 437 had an express portion between Downtown LA and Culver City where then it turned into a limited stop service down Culver Bl following former Line 220 to Marina Del Rey. Line 437 was transferred to LADOT Commuter Express.

=== 438 - Downtown L.A. - Culver City - Manhattan Beach via Highland Av Express ===
Line 438 was transferred to LADOT Commuter Express.

=== 439 - Downtown L.A. - Culver City - Fox Hills - LAX City Bus Center - Aviation/Imperial C Line Station - Redondo Beach Express ===
Line 439 was an express counterpart for Line 42. It was cancelled in June 2012 upon the opening of the E Line. The route initially terminated in Redondo Beach (replaced by Beach Cities Transit Line 109), later to Aviation/Imperial C Line Station, and then finally at Fox Hills Mall (replaced by Metro Local Line 217 extension (in 2020 when Line 217 was shortened at La Cienega/Jefferson E Line Station) while the E Line took over the express portion). In late 2019, LADOT Commuter Express line 439 went into service as a reverse commute version of line 438. This line is unrelated to the former Metro line 439. This was the last 43X series line in service.

== 440-450: via Harbor Transitway ==
=== 442 - Union Station - Downtown L.A. - Hawthorne / Lennox C Line Station - South Bay Galleria via - Manchester Ave, La Brea Ave, and Hawthorne Bl Express ===
Line 442 provided service between Downtown LA to Hawthorne/Lennox C Line Station (formerly to South Bay Galleria). It was an express counterpart of Line 40. It ran on Figueroa and Flower Sts through Harbor Transitway/Freeway before exiting Manchester Ave and traveling on that street and onto La Brea Ave and Hawthorne Bl. It terminated at South Bay Galleria until it was truncated to Hawthorne / Lennox C Line Station in 2006. Line 442 was canceled on December 13, 2020, due to low ridership. This line has not been operated since April 2020 due to COVID-19. Riders may use the C Line rail or bus Lines 40 and 115 to connect with the J Line service to/from downtown LA. This was the last 44X series line in service.

=== 443 - Downtown L.A. - North Torrance - Redondo Beach - Palos Verdes Express ===
Line 443 was canceled when Metro C Line began service. This rush-hour-only express line provided service to Downtown Los Angeles from South Bay along Artesia Bl west of Interstate 405, as well as Aviation Bl and Prospect Ave in Hermosa Beach and Redondo Beach, as express service for Lines 225 and 226, with the southern terminus at Malaga Cove Plaza Shopping Center. The other Metro and Torrance Transit express lines on the Harbor Transitway have replaced the service.

=== 444 - Union Station - Downtown L.A. - Rancho Palos Verdes via Artesia Bl and Hawthorne Bl Express ===
Line 444 provided service between Downtown LA and Rancho Palos Verdes. It ran through Figueroa and Flower Sts in Downtown Los Angeles, the Harbor Freeway as the express portion; Artesia and Hawthorne Bls in the South Bay. It made limited stops between the Harbor Gateway Transit Center and Pacific Coast Highway. It was renumbered Line 344 in December 2009, while the Metro J Line replaced the express service.

=== 445 - Union Station - Downtown L.A. - Harbor Gateway Transit Center - Alpine Village - San Pedro Express ===
Line 445 was canceled in June 2011 due to a budget crisis, replaced by an off-peak extension of Line 450 (between the Harbor Gateway Transit Center and San Pedro) and the Metro J Line (on the Harbor Transitway).

=== 446 - Union Station - Downtown L.A. - San Pedro via Pacific Ave Express ===
Line 446 provided service between Downtown Los Angeles and San Pedro. It ran through Figueroa and Flower Sts in Downtown LA, the Harbor Freeway as the express portion, and Avalon Bl and Pacific Ave through Carson, Wilmington, and San Pedro. It was shortened back to the Harbor Gateway Transit Center and renumbered Line 246 in December 2009, with the Metro J Line replacing the express service.

=== 447 - Union Station - Downtown L.A. - San Pedro via 7th St Express ===
Line 447, a partial duplication of Line 446, provided service between Downtown Los Angeles and San Pedro Peninsula Hospital. It ran through Figueroa and Flower Sts in Downtown Los Angeles, through the Harbor Freeway as the express portion, and through Avalon Bl, Harbor Bl, and 7th St through Carson, Wilmington and San Pedro. It was shortened back to the Harbor Gateway Transit Center and renumbered Line 247 in December 2009. Line 247 was replaced by Lines 205 and 450 in June 2011 due to a budget crisis, the latter being merged into the J Line in December 2015), with the Metro J Line replacing the express service.

=== 448 - Downtown L.A. - Palos Verdes Peninsula Express ===
Line 448 was transferred to LADOT Commuter Express.

=== 450 - Downtown L.A. - Harbor Gateway Transit Center - San Pedro (Pacific Ave/21st St) via Harbor Transitway Metro Express ===
Line 450 began as a premium express line between 7th St/Metro Center Station and Harbor Gateway Transit Center in December 2005. In June 2011, Line 450 was extended south of Harbor Gateway to San Pedro, replacing Line 445. It was renumbered 950 and absorbed by the Metro J Line in December 2015 as the busway line's extension to San Pedro. Metro is looking to reinstate Line 450 in the near future as part of Metro's NextGen plan of 2020, but has been contested by San Pedro representatives.

== 451-459: via Long Beach Freeway ==
=== 455 - Downtown L.A. - Paramount - Lakewood Express ===
Line 455 operated from Downtown Los Angeles to Bellflower and South in Lakewood, via southbound Interstate 5 and Interstate 710, then exiting the freeway and traveling via Rosecrans Ave, Paramount Bl, Compton Bl, Lakewood Bl, Alondra Bl and Bellflower Bl. It was only operated during weekday peak hours in peak directions: northbound during the morning hours and southbound during the afternoon hours; however, there isn't much service, as there is usually one bus line that would take patrons between Lakewood and Downtown Los Angeles. This line was not immediately canceled after the opening of the Metro A Line due in part that the northern terminus at 7th St / Metro Center Station and the southern loop in Downtown Long Beach was under construction; thus, this route continued to operate until June 1991, a few months after the opening 7th St / Metro Center Station.

=== 456 - Downtown L.A. - Downtown Long Beach Express ===
Line 456 had two iterations. The original route of the 456 was a 24-hour service, going nonstop on the Santa Ana Freeway [I-5] and the Long Beach [I-710] Freeway. Its northern terminus was at Temple St & Fremont Ave in Downtown Los Angeles, with surface streets on Flower and Figueroa Sts (going southbound and northbound respectively), & 5th and 6th Sts (westbound and eastbound respectively); while its southern terminus was at Long Beach & Ocean Bls, with Long Beach Bls as its main artery in the City of Long Beach. The 456 was soon cancelled shortly after the opening of the Metro A Line.

28 years later, Line 456 was revitalized as part of a pilot program due to the popular of the shuttle express predecessor (Line 860), when patrons wanted a faster express route between Downtown Los Angeles and Downtown Long Beach; this time, the route was nonstop between the Express Lanes entrance of the Harbor Freeway [I-110] and the Pacific Ave offramp from the San Diego Freeway [I-405]. Unlike the original version, it operated in weekday peak directions: northbound during the mornings and southbound during the afternoons. Due to the COVID-19 pandemic (and the failure of the pilot program due to low ridership), Line 456 was subsequently cancelled once again.

=== 457 - Downtown L.A. - East Long Beach - Long Beach Airport - Belmont Shore Express ===
Line 457 was a rush-hour only express line operating from Downtown Los Angeles (corner of Temple St and Los Angeles St) to the Marina Shores Shopping Center at the corner of Pacific Coast Highway and Westminster Ave in Belmont Shore. It also served a Park-n-Ride lot at the Long Beach Airport. From Los Angeles, it traveled on southbound Interstate 5, southbound Interstate 710 and southbound Interstate 405, exiting at Lakewood Bol in Long Beach. It first headed north on Lakewood Bl for the Long Beach Airport Park-n-Ride before traveling south on Lakewood Bl, through the Long Beach Traffic Cir and Ximeno Ave, and turning east on Second St to Belmont Shore. When the Metro A Line began service, a feeder Line 457 was put into service from the Del Amo A Line Station, but was cancelled shortly after.

=== 459 - Downtown L.A. - Los Alamitos - Huntington Beach - Goldenwest Transit Center Express ===
Line 459 was transferred to OCTA (now OC Bus) Line 701 in November 1987. In March 2020, OC Bus suspended Line 701 due to COVID-19, though later in 2023, it was permanently discontinued as part of OC Bus's systemwide, Making Better Connections Study.

== 460-469: via Santa Ana Freeway ==
=== 462 - Downtown L.A. - Santa Fe Springs - Norwalk - Cerritos - Hawaiian Gardens via Telegraph Rd and Pioneer Bl Express ===
Line 462 was renumbered Line 362 in October 1998 when the express portion of the route (along Interstate 5 between Lorena St and Eastern Ave) was eliminated in favor of a limited-stop routing along Olympic Bl and Telegraph Rd. In December 2005, the line was renumbered to Line 62 with additional stops added along the route.

=== 464 - Downtown L.A. - Fullerton Park & Ride Express ===
Line 464 was replaced by OCTA Line 721 in November 1986. In March 2020, OC Bus suspended Line 721 due to COVID-19, though later in 2023, it was permanently discontinued as part of OC Bus's systemwide, Making Better Connections Study.

=== 466 - Downtown L.A. - Downey - La Mirada Express via Rosecrans Ave ===
Line 466 was a rush-hour only express line serving between Downtown Los Angeles (at the corner of Temple St and Los Angeles St) and La Mirada Park-n-Ride (near Adelfa Dr and Santa Gertrudes Ave), traveling on Santa Ana Freeway. It had an off-freeway bus stop at the Lakewood Bl exit of Interstate 5 in Downey. Line 466 was cancelled in June 2001. Alternatives include Lines 104 (later transferred to Montebello Bus Line 50), 125 (A segment east of Norwalk Station was transferred to Norwalk Transit Line 5), and Line 460.

== 470-479: via Pomona Freeway ==
=== 470 - Downtown L.A. - Whittier - La Habra - Brea Mall via Whittier Bl and La Habra Bl Express ===
Line 470 between Whittier Bl / Garfield Av and Downtown Los Angeles were cancelled in October 1998. The remaining segment of Line 470 (from Garfield Av to Brea Mall) was replaced with Line 318 limited from 1998 to 2000. In 2000, when Metro Rapid Line 720 was implemented. Line 318 was discontinued and most of the segment became an extension of Metro Line 18 to Whittwood Town Center. While Line 471 was extended from Whittwood Town Center to Brea Mall replacing the former branch of Line 470. Line 471 was discontinued in February 2004 with the route being split between Foothill Transit and OCBus. Today, the section along Whittier Bl (from Atlantic Bl to Whittwood Town Center) is served by Montebello Bus Lines Line 10. Service from Whittier (Whittier Bl / Colima Rd) to La Habra (Beach Bl / La Habra Bl) is served by Foothill Transit Line 285, and from La Habra (Beach Bl / La Habra Bl) to Brea Mall is served by OCBus Route 129.

=== 471 - Downtown L.A. - Whittier - Puente Hills Mall - Brea Mall via Whittier Bl and Colima Rd Express ===
Line 471 between Whittier / Garfield and Downtown Los Angeles were cancelled in October 1998. Line 471's segment west of Whittier / Colima was replaced with Line 318 limited while Line 471 operated as a new shuttle between Puente Hills Mall to Whittwood Town Center via Colima Rd. In 2000, Rapid Line 720 was implemented, Line 318 was discontinued, and was replaced by local Line 18 extension to Whittwood Town Center. Line 471 was extended to Brea Mall attaching the former Lines 318/470 routings along Whittier Bl east of Colima Rd to the segment of Line 471 routing along Colima Rd to Puente Hills Mall, which made the new Line 471 a longer local line between Puente Hills Mall and Brea Mall. The new Line 471 was canceled in February 2004 when it was replaced by Foothill Transit Line 285 and OCBus Route 129.

== 480-489: via El Monte Busway ==
=== 480 - Westlake - Downtown L.A. - El Monte - West Covina - Pomona via Mission Bl Express ===
Line 480 was transferred to Foothill Transit in the late 1980s. It was regarded as the busiest route in the whole system (Prior to the launch of the Silver Streak in 2007). Initially, Line 480 ran 24 hours a day from Downtown L.A. to Pomona (Holt / Indian Hill), which later was extended to the Montclair Transit Center in the early 1990s. In March 2007, coinciding with the implementation of Silver Streak, Line 480 was shortened from Downtown LA to Plaza West Covina, discontinuing services from there, in addition to Westlake and El Monte. For the time being until December 2009, Metro Lines 484 and 490 provided additional service to Downtown LA from El Monte, which later were transferred to Metro J Line.

=== 481 - Koreatown - Wilshire District - Downtown L.A. - El Monte - West Covina Express ===
Line 481 was transferred to Foothill Transit in the late 1980s. The route was then cancelled in October 2017, services now provide Metro Local lines 18, 20, 51, 67; Metro Rapid Line 720, and the Silver Streak.

=== 482 - Downtown L.A. - El Monte - Hacienda Heights - Pomona via Santa Anita Ave and Colima Rd Express ===
Line 482 was transferred to Foothill Transit in the late 1980s. Currently it only has services between Pomona (Pomona Transit Center) and Puente Hills Mall. The express service form El Monte and Downtown Los Angeles around Freeway 60 and Santa Anita Ave was replaced by Foothill Transit line 269 (but continues from Santa Anita Ave and not the Freeway 60) in 2002. The Express service from Downtown Los Angeles was replaced by Metro Lines 484 & 490 (later the Metro J Line) & in addition to Foothill Transit Silver Streak. In 2010, the route from El Monte to Puente Hills Mall was split and replaced by Foothill Transit Line 282.

=== 483 - Downtown L.A. - Pasadena - Altadena via Fremont Ave and Fair Oaks Ave Express ===
Line 483 provided service from Downtown Los Angeles to Altadena, mainly on Fair Oaks Ave. It followed the same route as Line 485 from Downtown Los Angeles to Fremont Ave and Huntington Dr in South Pasadena. Line 483 was canceled in June 2003 with the advent of the Metro L Line, now Metro A Line, and the Fair Oaks Ave portion was replaced by restructured Lines 260 and 361 (Line 361 replaced by Metro Rapid 762 in June 2008). Then in December 2021, Line 660 replaced Line 260 service on Fair Oaks Ave north of Walnut Av to Altadena.

=== 484 - Downtown L.A. - El Monte - Pomona - Ontario Airport via Valley Bl and Holt Bl Express ===
Line 484 traveled from Downtown Los Angeles to as far as the old Ontario Airport terminal off Vineyard Ave in Ontario. It was subsequently shorted to the County Line in 1998 in favor of Omnitrans Line 61, then to Pomona Transit Center in 2000, and then further shorted to Cal Poly Pomona in 2004 in favor of Foothill Transit Line 482 and short-lived Metro Line 684 (now Foothill Transit Line 286). Line 484 was then renumbered to Line 194 in December 2009 before the line was transferred to the Foothill Transit in late June 2016, with the Metro J Line replacing the express service.

=== 485 - Downtown L.A. - Pasadena - Altadena via Fremont Ave and Lake Ave Express ===
Line 485 ran from Downtown Los Angeles to Altadena through Fremont Ave and Lake Ave. Most of the line was merged into Line 258 in June 2016 with the exception of the El Monte Busway segment to Patsaouras Transit Plaza. Replacement of the Downtown LA segment is provided by Lines 487/489 and the Metro J Line (Line 910). Line 258 was realigned to Highland Park in December 2020 due to low ridership; the city of San Marino on Oak Knoll Ave via Lake Ave (Pasadena) between Huntington Dr to California Bl. The portion on Lake Ave is now served by Line 662 (Between Del Mar Bl & Altadena Dr) as of June 2021. Prior to June 2011, Line 485 used to run further into Downtown LA, terminating at Olive / Venice, and also operated on weekends until it was shortened at Union Station and reduced to a weekday only service.

=== 486 - Downtown L.A. - El Monte - Puente Hills Mall via Amar Rd and Azusa Ave Express ===
Line 486 was transferred to Foothill Transit in the late 1980s. Route remained the same until 2002, where the segment between Azusa Av/Amar Rd and Puente Hills Mall was rerouted to Mt. SAC Transit Center and Cal Poly Pomona via Amar Rd. In 2007, the Express route west of El Monte to Los Angeles was replaced by the Silver Streak. In 2023, Foothill Transit Line 486 was further extended eastward to Pomona Transit Center via Holt Bl.

=== 488 - Downtown L.A. - El Monte - West Covina - Glendora via Francisquito Av and Grand Ave Express ===
Line 488 was transferred to Foothill Transit in the late 1980s. In 2007, the Express route west of El Monte to Los Angeles was replaced by the Silver Streak.

== 490-499: via El Monte Busway (Services near San Bernardino County) ==
=== 490 - Downtown L.A. - Covina - Diamond Bar - Brea Mall - Cal State Fullerton via Ramona Ave and Diamond Bar Bl Express ===
Line 490 traveled from Downtown Los Angeles to Cal State Fullerton via Interstate 10 and SR 57 freeways. Line 490 was shortened to Brea Mall in 2003, and then to Cal Poly Pomona in 2004. In 2009, the western terminus was shortened from Downtown LA to El Monte station, and it was renumbered Line 190 (later transferred to Foothill Transit), with the Metro J Line replacing the express service. The segment between Pomona and Brea Mall was briefly served by Metro Line 684 from 2004 to 2007 where it was transferred to be served by Foothill Transit Line 286, retaining most of the route except its removal of service to Cal Poly Pomona. Service between Brea Mall and Cal State Fullerton is provided by OCBus Line 57.

=== 491 - Westlake - Downtown L.A. - El Monte - Sierra Madre via Santa Anita Ave and Sierra Madre Av Express ===
Line 491 provided service from Downtown Los Angeles to Sierra Madre via El Monte Busway. It operated as an express from Westlake/MacArthur Park station through Downtown Los Angeles and El Monte Busway until El Monte station. From El Monte station, the route operated as a local route making all stops along Santa Anita Ave. The route number was retired as a result of the opening of the Metro L Line (now Metro A Line) and interlined with Line 487, this practice was done during the weekend service for several years. In 2006, the 487 split into two routes, Line 487 still running from Sierra Madre to Downtown while Line 287 operated the local Santa Anita Ave service. In 2009, lines 287 and 487 were merged (later in June 2021, Line 287 returned service on Santa Anita Av between El Monte station and Huntington Dr).

=== 492 - Downtown L.A. - El Monte - South Arcadia - San Dimas via Arrow Hwy Express ===
Line 492 was transferred to Foothill Transit in December 1988 by the former LACTC (Los Angeles County Transportation Commission, now part of Metro) when the former SCRTD (Southern California Rapid Transit District, predecessor of Metro) announced cuts that would adversely impact services in San Gabriel Valley. Unlike the current Foothill Transit Line 492, Metro (previously RTD at the time) Line 492 ran on weekday rush hour only compared to Foothill's daily service. Also under Foothill Transit, Line 492 was further extended eastward to Montclair replacing a segment of Line 185.

=== 493 - Downtown L.A. - El Monte - Monrovia via Peck Rd Express ===
Line 493 was discontinued between Downtown L.A. and El Monte, with the remainder of the Line transferred to Line 270 (later transferred to Foothill Transit). A different incarnation Line 493 was then implemented by Foothill Transit with services between Diamond Bar (formerly), Industry Park & Ride (now begins at Rowland Heights), Puente Hills Mall to Downtown Los Angeles.

=== 494 - Downtown L.A. - El Monte - Monrovia - Glendora via Peck Rd and Foothill Bl Express ===
Line 494 was transferred to Foothill Transit in December 1988 by the former LACTC (Los Angeles County Transportation Commission, now part of Metro) when the former SCRTD (Southern California Rapid Transit Authority, predecessor of Metro) announced cuts that would adversely impact services in San Gabriel Valley. Line 494 was then cancelled in December 2017, the route was replaced by Foothill Transit Lines 270, 187, and 492 (all three lines were formerly operated by Metro).

=== 495 - Downtown L.A. - Rowland Heights - Diamond Bar - Park-n-Ride Express ===
Line 495 was transferred to Foothill Transit in December 1988 by the former LACTC (Los Angeles County Transportation Commission, now part of Metro) when the former SCRTD (Southern California Rapid Transit Authority, predecessor of Metro) announced cuts that would adversely impact services in San Gabriel Valley. Line 495 was one of the first lines operated by Foothill Transit. Portions of the service are now provided by Foothill Transit Line 493.

=== 496 - Downtown L.A. - El Monte - Pomona - Montclair - Riverside - San Bernardino Express ===
Line 496 had a complicated history throughout the years. Line 496 was transferred to a private contractor (Inland Empire Connection) in 1990 by transit agencies from LA, Riverside, and San Bernardine with a sister line Line 110. Later in 1993 with the opening Metrolink San Bernardino Line, Line 496 began to have adjustments and service cuts. In 1995, RTA (Riverside Transit Agency) Route 49 implemented at a former segment of the former Line 496 between The Country Village and Downtown Riverside, while Line 496 retained service with a deeper reduction on capacity. In 1998, IEC then discontinued Line 496 due to budget constraints and declining ridership. In 2003, Riverside Transit implemented Commuterlink Route 204 between Downtown Riverside (now begins at UC Riverside) and Montclair similar to the former Line 496.

=== 497 - Downtown L.A. - Via Verde - Fairplex - Pomona - Montclair Express ===
Line 497 was canceled on June 11, 2001. Service is now provided by Foothill Transit Lines 499 and 699; and Silver Streak.

=== 498 - Downtown L.A. - Eastland Center - Glendora - Grand Park & Ride Express ===
Line 498 was transferred to Foothill Transit in December 1988 by the former LACTC (Los Angeles County Transportation Commission, now part of Metro) when the former SCRTD (Southern California Rapid Transit Authority, predecessor of Metro) announced cuts that would adversely impact services in San Gabriel Valley. In 2019, Foothill Transit Line 498 was rerouted to Industry Park & Ride (then shortened to Plaza West Covina in 2022) while a reincarnation of Foothill Transit Line 490 took service from West Covina to Glendora.

== 500s: Serving areas other than Downtown ==
=== 515 - Redondo Beach / Marine C Line Station - Artesia A Line Station Express (A Line Transfer) ===
Line 515 was a special project funded with a federal clean air grant. Service began in August 1993 and ran through June 1995. It provided weekday peak hour express service from the Metro A Line in Artesia to the El Segundo Employment Center via Redondo Beach / Marine C Line Station. Westbound to El Segundo in the morning rush hour and Eastbound from there in the afternoon rush hour.

=== 522 - Northridge - Universal City - Hollywood - Downtown L.A. via Reseda Bl, Ventura Bl, and Hollywood Freeway Express ===
Line 522 was renumbered Line 240 in June 2000 and realigned to terminate at Universal City Station, with the Metro B Line replacing the express service. The line initially terminated at the US 101 Freeway bus stop at Vermont Ave before it was extended into Downtown Los Angeles, which was initially assigned the 500-series line number and the only route to operate in Downtown Los Angeles.

=== 534 - Malibu - Downtown Santa Monica - Washington/Fairfax Transit Hub via Pacific Coast Hwy & Santa Monica Freeway ===
Line 534 replaced the western remainder of Line 434 in December 2005 between Washington/Fairfax Transit Hub Transit Center and Malibu. Until the opening of the Metro E Line extension to Santa Monica, the eastern terminus of the route was relocated to the new Downtown Santa Monica station, leaving service on I-10 Fwy to be canceled. 6 years later, Line 534 was renumbered to Local Line 134 on October 23, 2022, as part of Phase 4.5 of the NextGen Plan, as the route now runs more like a local route. The route and stops remain the same in the new Line 134.

=== 560/561 - Lake View Terrace/Sylmar - Sherman Oaks - Westwood - Culver City - LAX City Bus Center- Aviation/Imperial C Line Station via Van Nuys Bl and San Diego Freeway Express ===
Line 560 traveled between Lakeview Terrace and LAX (LA International Airport) Bus Terminal before it was split into Line 233 and Line 561. Line 561 operated as a limited-stop version of Line 233 on Van Nuys Bl then on the Interstate 405 freeway between Sherman Oaks and Getty Center and between Westwood and Culver City, Line 561 was replaced with Metro Rapid Line 761 (later 734, now reverted to 761) on Van Nuys Bl on June 29, 2003, and discontinued south of Westwood. The portion south of Westwood was replaced by Culver City Transit Line 6.

=== 576 - South Los Angeles (Vernon) - Beverly Hills - Pacific Palisades Express ===
Line 576 was canceled in December 2004. Service is now provided by Metro Express Line 134 and Metro Local Line 105. Known as the "Nanny Express", Line 576 began shortly after the Watts riots to help with access to jobs, ferrying cooks, butlers and other household staff from the neighborhoods in South Los Angeles to employers in Beverly Hills, Westwood, Pacific Palisades and Malibu.

== See also ==
- List of former Metro Local routes
