= Whittier Transit =

- Commenced operation: July 8, 1985
- Ceased operation: September 19, 2011
- Locale: Whittier, California
- Service type: bus service
- Routes: 2 (1985-2007); 1 (2007-2011)
- Operator: Private contractors (1985-2005); Norwalk Transit (2005-2011)

Whittier Transit was a local circulator bus service in the city of Whittier, California, which operated from 1985 to 2007 as an independent system. In 2007, it was merged into Norwalk Transit; local service in Whittier ended in 2011 during a series of service cuts.

== History ==
Whitter is laid out in an oblong shape connected by only one major street, making crosstown trips difficult for residents without cars. In the early 1980s, local officials began agitating for local bus service in addition to existing Southern California Rapid Transit District commuter bus routes. The service began on July 8, 1985 with two routes connecting residential areas, shopping areas, and existing RTD bus stops. The system cost $100,000 in construction and $550,000 in operations subsidy in 1985, funded largely by Proposition A (a half cent sakes tax approved in 1980), with passengers paying a 25 cent fare. The service began with four 23-foot (7.0 m) buses operating on 45-minute headways. In contrast to RTD routes running only on major streets, Whittier Transit buses ran into residential neighborhoods to support local trips within the city.

In the 1990s, the original buses were replaced by tourist trolleys, which were criticized for their high cost and polluting emissions. Connections were available at various locations in the town to several other operators, including LACMTA Metro Local (the 1993 successor to RTD), Foothill Transit, Montebello Bus Lines and Norwalk Transit. Competition from these other operators, which operated only on major streets but often with higher frequency, cut into Whittier Transit ridership which declined 32% between 1999 and 2005.

Operations were contracted out to Norwalk Transit in 2005, which ran the two routes (still branded as Whittier Transit) on one-hour headways with a 35 cent fare. In 2007, Whittier ceased funding Whittier Transit as a separate system; the two routes were combined into Norwalk Transit Route 7.

In July 2011, Norwalk Transit proposed to discontinue service on Route 7, as well as Route 8 from Norwalk to Whittier, in an attempt to balance Norwalk's transportation budget. The Norwalk lines had poor ridership due to competition from other companies. After the Whittier City Council declined to provide $1.1 million annually to fund the service, the routes were cut on September 19, 2011, ending circulator service in Whittier.

Commuter and limited local bus service is provided to parts of Whittier by Foothills Transit route 274, Norwalk route 7, Montebello Bus Lines routes 40 and 90 express (formerly express 342), and Norwalk Transit routes 1 and 3. The City of Whittier provides "Dial-a-Ride" demand responsive transport as ADA paratransit and for seniors.
