= Norwalk Transit =

Norwalk Transit may refer to one of two transit agencies in the United States serving different cities named Norwalk:

- Norwalk Transit District, serving Norwalk, Connecticut, and surrounding communities
- Norwalk Transit (California), serving Norwalk, California, and also operates in portions of Artesia, Bellflower, Cerritos, Industry, La Mirada and Whittier in Southeast Los Angeles County
