= Norwalk/Santa Fe Springs station =

Commuter rail station in Norwalk, California & Santa Fe Springs, California

Norwalk/Santa Fe Springs
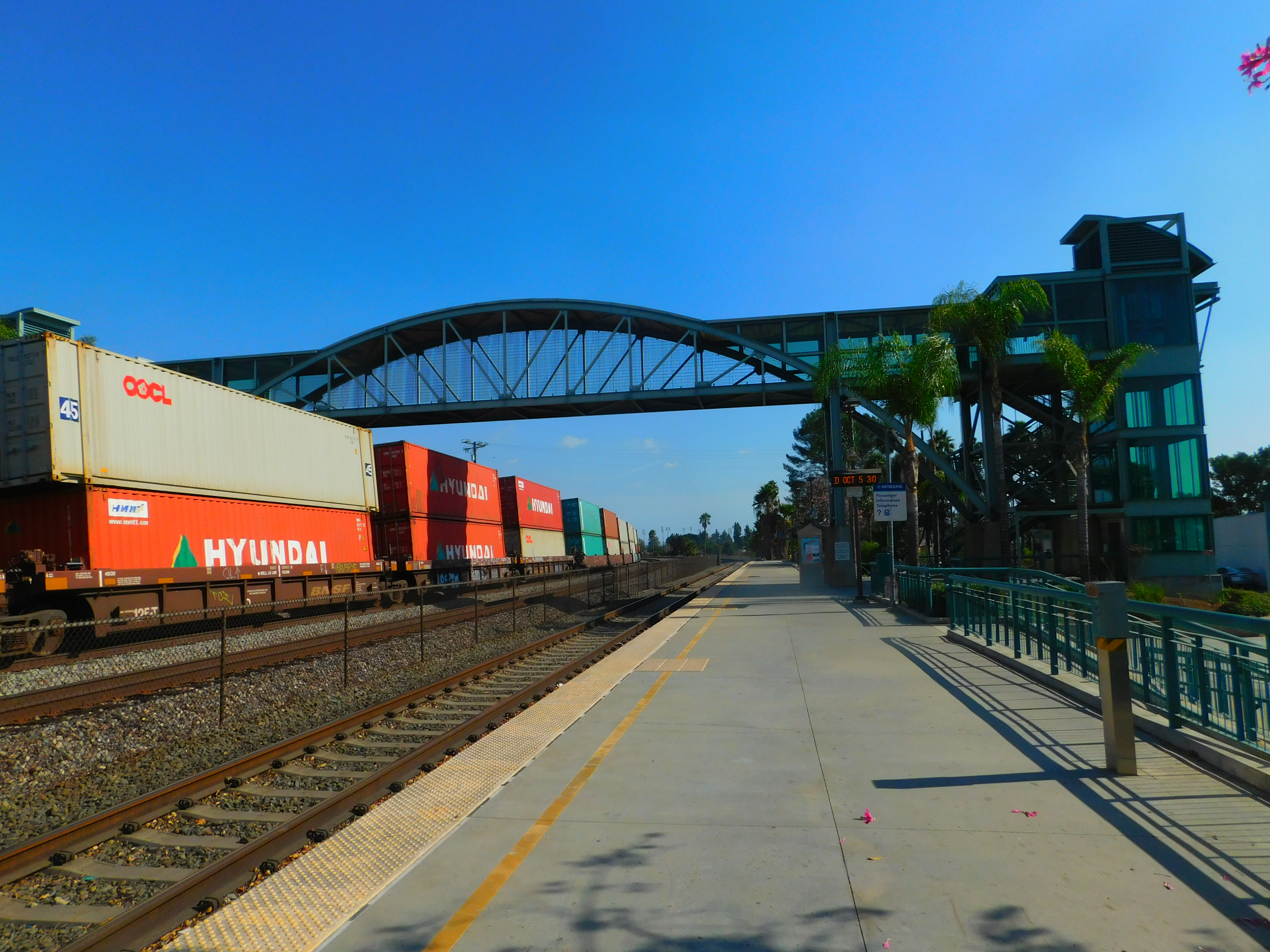
- The Norwalk/Santa Fe Springs station in September 2016. A BNSF freight train is on the left.

General information
- Location: 12700 Imperial Highway; Norwalk, California
- Coordinates: 33°54′58″N 118°03′37″W
- Owner: Cities of Norwalk and Santa Fe Springs (except tracks); BNSF Railway (tracks)
- Line: BNSF San Bernardino Subdivision
- Platforms: 2 side platforms
- Tracks: 4
- Connections: Norwalk Transit; Santa Fe Springs Metrolink Express

Construction
- Parking: 630 spaces, 18 accessible spaces, paid
- Cycle facilities: Racks, lockers
- Accessible: Yes

History
- Opened: July 17, 1995

Passengers
- FY 2026: 543 (avg. wkdy boardings)

Services
Preceding station	Metrolink	Following station
L.A. Union Station Terminus	91/Perris Valley Line	Buena Park toward Perris–South
L.A. Union Station Terminus	Orange County Line	Buena Park toward Oceanside
Commerce (limited service) toward L.A. Union Station	Orange County Line	Buena Park toward Oceanside
Former services (at AT&SF station)
Preceding station	Atchison, Topeka and Santa Fe Railway	Following station
Los Nietos toward Los Angeles	Surf Line	La Mirada toward San Diego
Location

Norwalk/Santa Fe Springs station is a Metrolink rail station in Norwalk, California and Santa Fe Springs, California. It is served by Metrolink's 91/Perris Valley Line from Los Angeles Union Station to Riverside and Metrolink's Orange County Line running from Los Angeles Union Station to Oceanside. On weekdays, this station is served by 19 Orange County Line trains and nine 91/Perris Valley Line trains. On weekends, eight Orange County Line trains and four 91/Perris Valley Line trains serve this station.

== Transit connections ==
Norwalk Transit operates a connector shuttle bus service Route 4 which covers the 2.8-mile (4.5 km) gap between the Norwalk/Santa Fe Springs Transportation Center and the Metro C Line station in Norwalk. All Norwalk Transit and LA Metro connections, including Route 4, are free with a Metrolink ticket.

== Future plans ==
There have been persistent proposals, especially due to the original plans for the Century Freeway to connect to the 5, for a 2.8-mile (4.5 km) eastward extension of the Los Angeles Metro Rail's C Line from its current eastern terminus at Norwalk station to reach Norwalk/Santa Fe Springs station. This project carries a proposed cost of $321 million for an aerial bridge, and a $360 million cost for an underground tunnel. Since an initial Environmental Impact Review (EIR) in 1993, there has been no solid progress for this proposal. The Los Angeles County Metropolitan Transportation Authority (Metro) 2009 Long Range Transportation Plan (LRTP) lists funding priorities to build through year 2040 – the C Line east extension is not a funded project in the Metro's 2009 LRTP nor Measure R and is instead in the Tier 1 Strategic Unfunded Plan. Within Measure M it is planned to have service operational sometime around 2052.

The California High-Speed Rail Authority is considering the station as a possible stop on the first phase of the California High-Speed Rail project.
