= Norwalk Transit (California) =

Bus transportation provider in Norwalk, California

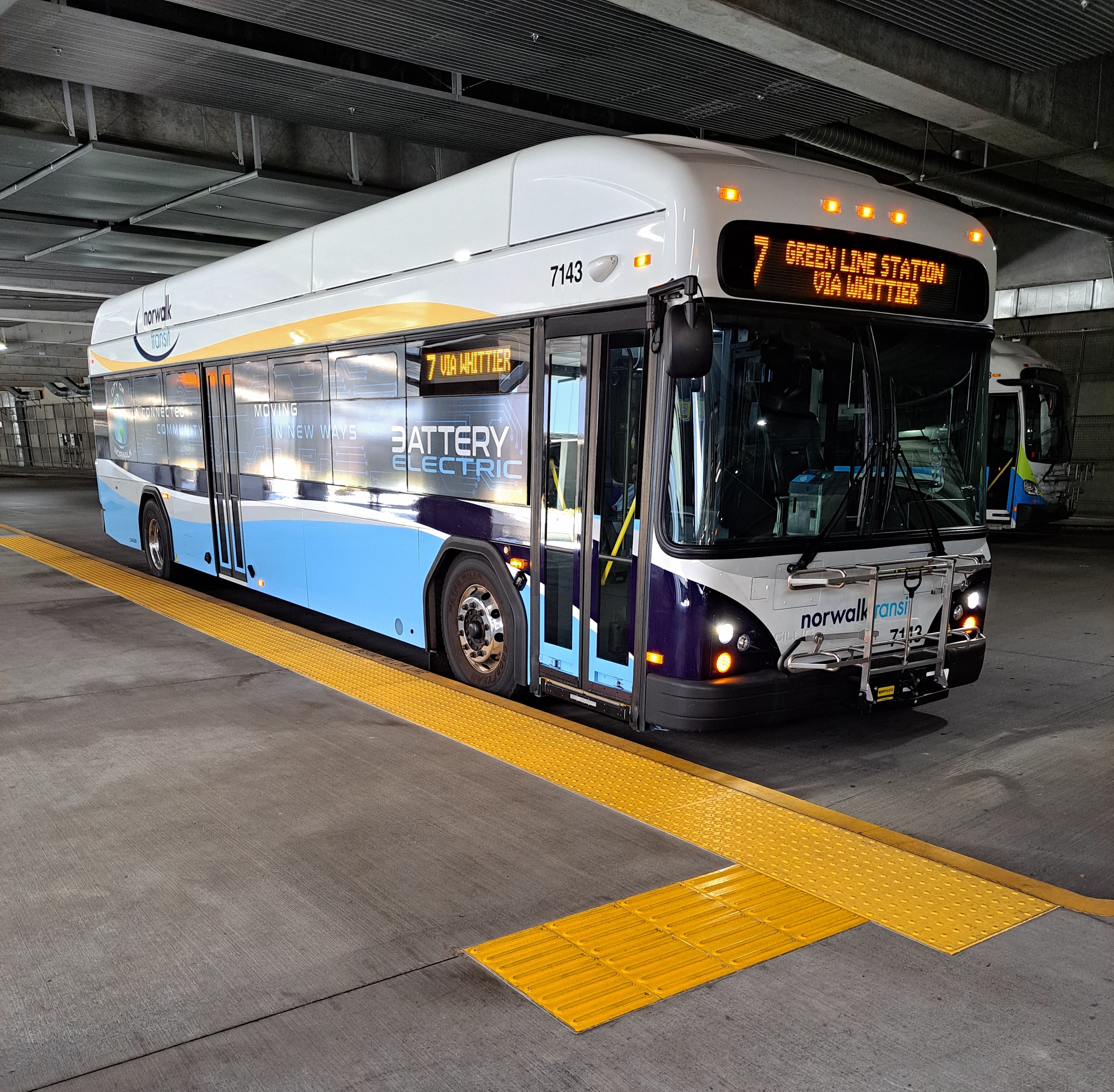
- Norwalk Transit bus at El Monte station
- Parent: City of Norwalk
- Headquarters: 12650 East Imperial Highway
- Locale: Norwalk, California
- Service type: bus service, paratransit
- Routes: 6
- Daily ridership: 5,200 (weekdays, Q2 2026)
- Annual ridership: 1,327,700 (2025)
- Website: Official website

Norwalk Transit is a municipal transit company providing fixed-route and paratransit bus transit services in Norwalk, California, United States, and also operates in portions of Artesia, Bellflower, Cerritos, La Habra, La Mirada, Santa Fe Springs and Whittier in southeast Los Angeles County and northwestern Orange County. In 2025, the system had a ridership of 1,327,700, or about 5,200 per weekday as of the second quarter of 2026.

Norwalk Transit receives its operating revenue from farebox receipts and state tax revenue distributed by the Los Angeles County Metropolitan Transportation Authority.

== History ==
Norwalk Transit began operation in 1974, a project led by Mayor John Zimmerman Jr.

In 2005, Norwalk Transit began operating Whittier Transit service under contract. The two routes were combined into Norwalk Transit route 7 in 2007, which was discontinued on 19 September 2011 during a series of cuts to Norwalk Transit. As of 27 June 2016 Route 7 returned in operation.

== Routes ==
Norwalk Transit operates a connector shuttle bus service between the Norwalk/Santa Fe Springs Transportation Center and the Norwalk Station on the Metro C Line.

Presently, Metrolink (commuter rail service between Orange County and Los Angeles) provides weekday train service to the Norwalk/Santa Fe Springs Transportation Center. The rail feeder service implemented by Norwalk Transit provides direct interconnectivity between rail stations (Metrolink – commuter rail and Metro C Line light rail).

Norwalk Transit's paratransit dial-a-ride service operates within the jurisdictional boundary of the City of Norwalk.

=== Local routes ===
Route	Terminals		Via	Notes
1	Whittier; Rio Hondo College	Bellflower; Woodruff Av & Rosecrans Av	Norwalk Bl	Serves Cerritos College; In Bellflower, Southbound provides a long turnaround loop via Woodruff, Flower, Clark, & Rosecrans to Woodruff Av & Rosecrans Av; Northbound only run via Woodruff Av to Alondra Bl
2	Norwalk Norwalk Town Square		Pioneer Bl, Studebaker Rd	Serves Los Cerritos Center, Cerritos College and Norwalk station; Clockwise and Counter Clockwise route
3	Santa Fe Springs; Telegraph Rd & Carmenita Rd	Norwalk; Norwalk Bl & 166th St	Telegraph Rd, Norwalk Bl	
4	Norwalk; Norwalk station	La Habra; Imperial Hwy & Idaho St	Imperial Hwy	Serves the 2.4 mile "Norwalk gap" between the Norwalk/Santa Fe Springs Metrolink Station station and Norwalk station.
5	Norwalk; Norwalk station	La Mirada; Adelfa Dr & Santa Gertrudes Av	Rosecrans Av	
7	Norwalk; Norwalk station	El Monte; El Monte station	Santa Fe Springs Rd, Peck Rd	Serves Whittier College and Rio Hondo College

== Bus fleet ==
=== Active fleet ===
Fleet numbers	Year	Make/Model	Engine	Transmission
7120-7122	2012	Gillig BRT CNG 40'	Cummins Westport ISL G EPA10	Allison B400R
7123-7133	2013	Gillig BRT CNG 40'	Cummins Westport ISL G EPA10	Allison B400R
7134-7137	2017	Gillig BRT CNG 40'	Cummins Westport L9N EPA17	Allison B400R
7138-7140	2018-2019	Gillig BRT CNG 40'	Cummins Westport L9N EPA17	Allison B400R
7141-7144	2021	Gillig Low Floor EV 40'	Cummins BES	BAE Systems HDS220
7145-7148	2021	Gillig BRT CNG 40'	Cummins Westport L9N EPA17	Allison B400R
7149-7150	2023	Gillig Low Floor EV 40'	Cummins BES	BAE Systems HDS220
7151-7152	2024	Gillig Low Floor EV 40'	Cummins BES	BAE Systems HDS220
