= K Line Northern Extension =

Planned light rail extension project in Los Angeles, California

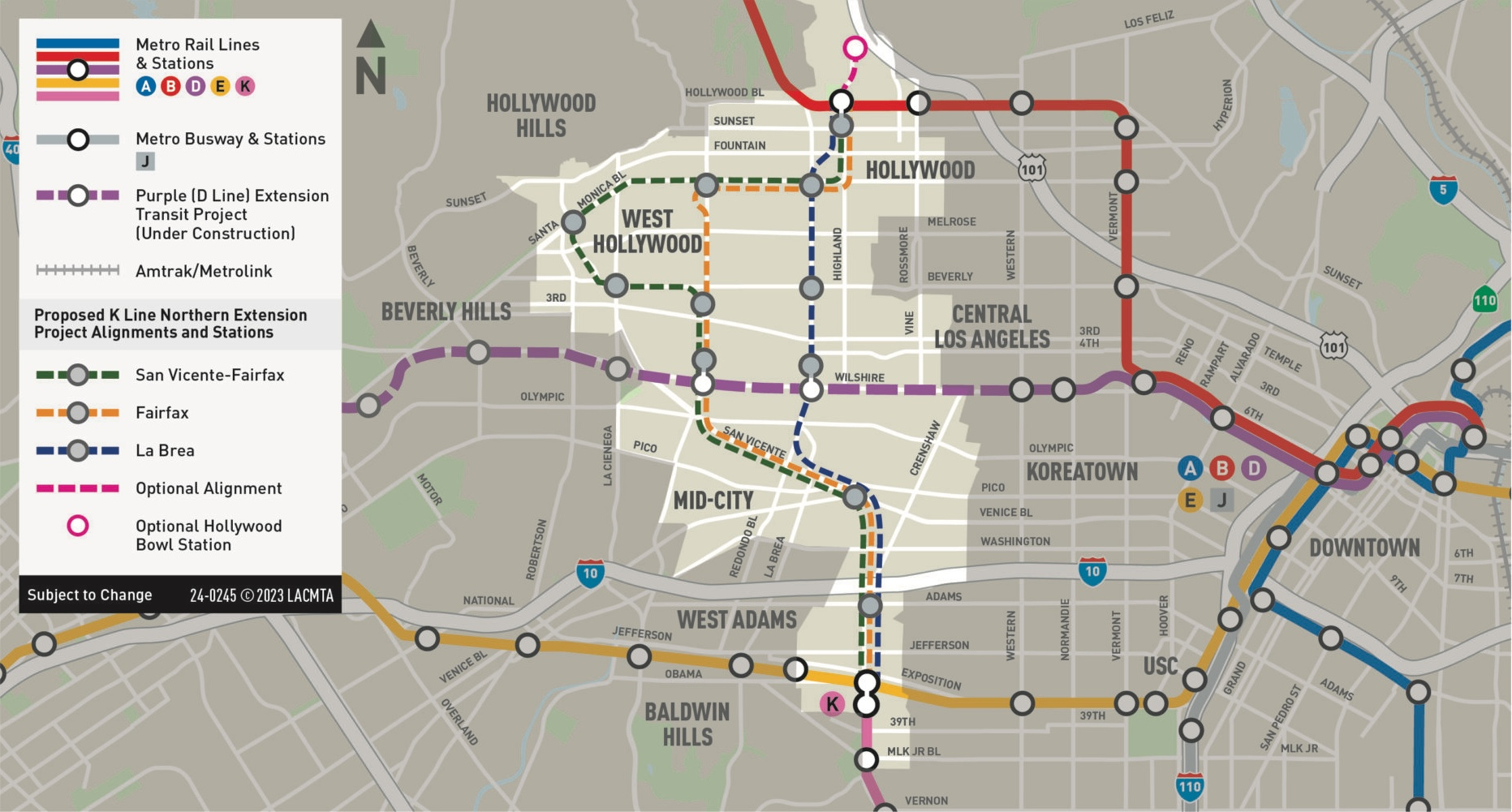
- Official Metro map of the study area of the K Line Northern Extension

Overview
- Status: Environmental review
- Locale: Crenshaw; West Hollywood; Hollywood
- Termini: Expo/Crenshaw; Wilshire/Fairfax (IOS) Hollywood Bowl (future)
- Stations: 10
- Website: metro.net/projects/kline-northern-extension

Service
- Type: Light rail
- System: Los Angeles Metro Rail
- Operator: Los Angeles Metro

History
- Planned opening: 2047 (expected)

Technical
- Line length: 9.7 miles (15.6 km)
- Number of tracks: 2
- Character: Fully underground
- Track gauge: 4 ft 8 1/2 in (1,435 mm) standard gauge
- Electrification: Overhead line, 750 V DC

The K Line Northern Extension, formerly known as the Crenshaw Northern Extension, is a planned Los Angeles Metro Rail light rail extension connecting Expo/Crenshaw station to Hollywood/Highland station in Hollywood. The corridor is a fully underground, north–south route along mostly densely populated areas on the western side of the Los Angeles Basin; it would be operated as part of the K Line. Los Angeles Metro is prioritizing the project along with pressure from the West Hollywood residents. Construction is slated to start in 2041 and begin service by 2047, although local officials are attempting to accelerate this timeline using Enhanced Infrastructure Financing District (EIFD).

On July 23, 2024, LA Metro released the draft of the Environmental Impact Report (EIR) for the K Line Northern Extension, putting the price tag of the project between $11 billion and $14.8 billion (including a 40% contingency cost).

== Overview ==
Los Angeles Metro budgeted $2.33 billion from Measure M. The Crenshaw/LAX corridor Line was a corridor designated for public transit. It became a light rail line between the C Line and the E Line, with planned connections to LAX. After almost ten years of construction, the K Line, as it was named, opened in 2022. A northern extension could connect with regional job centers and tourist destinations, such as Cedars-Sinai Medical Center, Beverly Center, The Grove, Farmers Market shopping area, and LACMA. The West Hollywood areas are also in the projected routes, Melrose and the Sunset Strip within walking distance.

=== Original planning ===
The original plans for the Crenshaw Corridor project connected Wilshire Blvd to LAX. However, during the environmental review, Metro determined that if LRT were selected as the preferred mode, the cost for the entire route would exceed the project budget. In December 2009, the Metro Board decided on LRT as the preferred mode; as a result, the part of the corridor north of Exposition Boulevard was deferred until funds became available. This segment can be considered a "Phase Two" extension of the original line.

Any Phase Two extension would be expected to connect to the D Line, the first phase of which is currently under construction as part of the D Line Extension project.

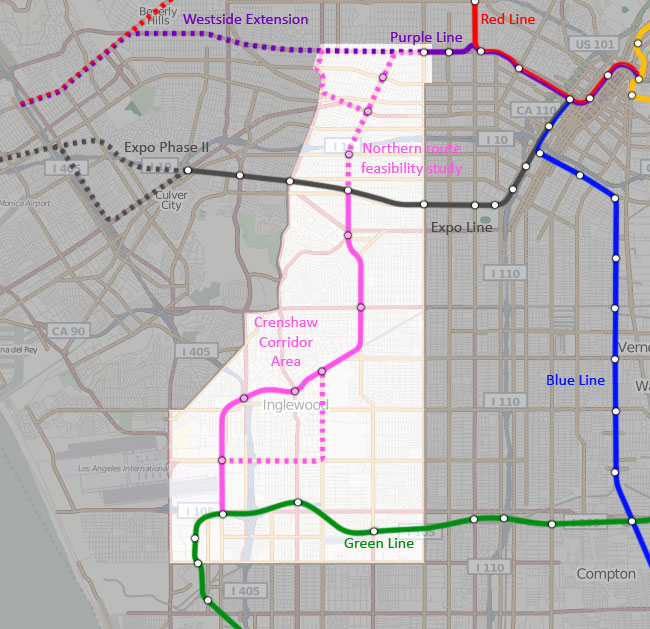
Map of the combined K line and Northern Extension as envisioned in 2008

In May 2009, Metro released a report on the feasibility of an extension north to Wilshire Boulevard. It first screened two routes—one to Wilshire/La Brea, and another to Wilshire/Crenshaw. Through this screening, staff concluded that Wilshire/La Brea station would be more cost-effective and compatible with land uses and plans along it. Specifically, the report cited the following advantages of the La Brea route over the Crenshaw route:

- Greater residential and job density,
- Supportive land uses for a high-capacity subway,
- Stronger regional potential to link this corridor northward towards Hollywood in the future,
- Strong community support in the Hancock Park area and
- Fewer geotechnical soil impacts compared to the hydrogen sulfide soil along Crenshaw Blvd north of Pico Boulevard.

In October 2010, the Metro Board voted to eliminate the Wilshire/Crenshaw station from the D Line Subway Extension project for similar reasons.

The 3.5-mile Wilshire/La Brea route heads north on Crenshaw to Venice, west on Venice to San Vicente, continuing northwest on San Vicente to La Brea, and then north on La Brea to Wilshire. It has three possible stations: Crenshaw/Adams (optional), Pico/San Vicente, and Wilshire/La Brea.

The feasibility report also allowed for two possible branches/extensions along La Brea Ave, Fairfax Ave, La Cienega Blvd, or San Vicente Blvd heading north of Wilshire into West Hollywood and/or Hollywood.

In November 2010, Metro staff produced an initial review of the feasibility of studying a new transit corridor to connect the Crenshaw Corridor to West Hollywood and/or Hollywood.

In May 2014, the West Hollywood City Council considered a proposal by Council members John Heilman and Jeffrey Prang to engage a lobbyist to promote the need for Metro rail services in West Hollywood. The Heilman/Prang proposal notes that "former Los Angeles Mayor Antonio Villaraigosa assured West Hollywood representatives that West Hollywood would be 'next in line.'" In 2015, the West Hollywood City Council launched the West Hollywood Advocates for Metro Rail (WHAM) as part of a campaign to win grassroots support for a Metro rail extension into the city.

In September 2016, in a letter to West Hollywood City Council member Lindsey Horvath, Metro CEO Phil Washington outlined several steps Metro is taking to make the Crenshaw/LAX northern extension "shovel ready" should county voters approve Measure M, a countywide ballot measure adding new transit projects and expediting others previously approved under Measure R.

=== Connection to Phase One ===
The final design of "Phase One" (the original project line south of Exposition Blvd to LAX) would determine how the Phase Two project could or would connect to Phase One. The original locally preferred alternative (LPA) for the Crenshaw/LAX Line from the draft environmental impact study (Draft EIS/EIR) specified an at-grade station at the Phase One Expo/Crenshaw terminus, with the Leimert Park tunnel ending several blocks south of that, near 39th Street. If Phase One were built per the LPA, then Phase Two would require the building of a new tunnel with a connection near 39th Street. This would need the north end of the Leimert Park tunnel to be outfitted with knockout panels to allow for the possible future extension north.

Metro also studied "Design Option 6" for Phase One, which would extend the Leimert Park tunnel north to the line's northern terminus at Exposition, with an underground station at Crenshaw/Exposition. This design option was selected so that Phase Two can connect to Phase One directly at the Crenshaw/Exposition station's tunnels. This design option increased the cost of the original Phase One project by $236 million.

== Route ==
=== Proposed ===
In July 2018, Metro released its initial set of rail concepts and rail alternatives for the corridor, conducted by AECOM. These concepts included five alternative plans for study. These included different alignments but the same mode, light rail, as Phase 1 of the Crenshaw-LAX Line was currently under construction as light rail. Of the original five, a "Vermont Route" option was dropped in October 2019 due to public comments. A hybrid San Vicente option was added at the same time. On August 17, 2020, Metro recommended three final alignments for environmental analysis and advanced conceptual engineering. The current three alternatives considered are all south to north routes:

DEIR Alternative	Description	New trips (daily)	Estimated cost (billions)
1: San Vicente Hybrid Alternative	Continuing north underground from Expo/Crenshaw station and veers northwest underneath San Vicente Boulevard. Heads north underneath Fairfax Avenue for one mile. Turns west underneath Beverly Boulevard at the Grove Market for one mile and heads north underneath San Vicente Boulevard at Beverly Center Mall for another mile. Then east underneath Santa Monica Boulevard through West Hollywood to terminate at Hollywood/Highland station or a Hollywood Bowl station in Hollywood. This route was added in late 2019 due to public comments about wanting direct access to local work and tourist destinations.	90,000	5.5
2: Fairfax Alternative	Continuing north underground from Expo/Crenshaw station and veers northwest underneath San Vicente Boulevard. Heads north underneath Fairfax Avenue through Central Los Angeles to West Hollywood, where it turns east underneath Santa Monica Boulevard towards Hollywood/Highland or Hollywood Bowl station in Hollywood.	88,700	4.7
3: La Brea Alternative	Continuing north underground from Expo/Crenshaw station and veers northwest underneath San Vicente Boulevard. Heads underneath La Brea Avenue through Central Los Angeles to West Hollywood, where it turns east underneath Santa Monica Boulevard towards Hollywood/Highland or Hollywood Bowl station in Hollywood.	87,200	3.0

The following table shows all potential metro stations and the alternatives for which they apply:

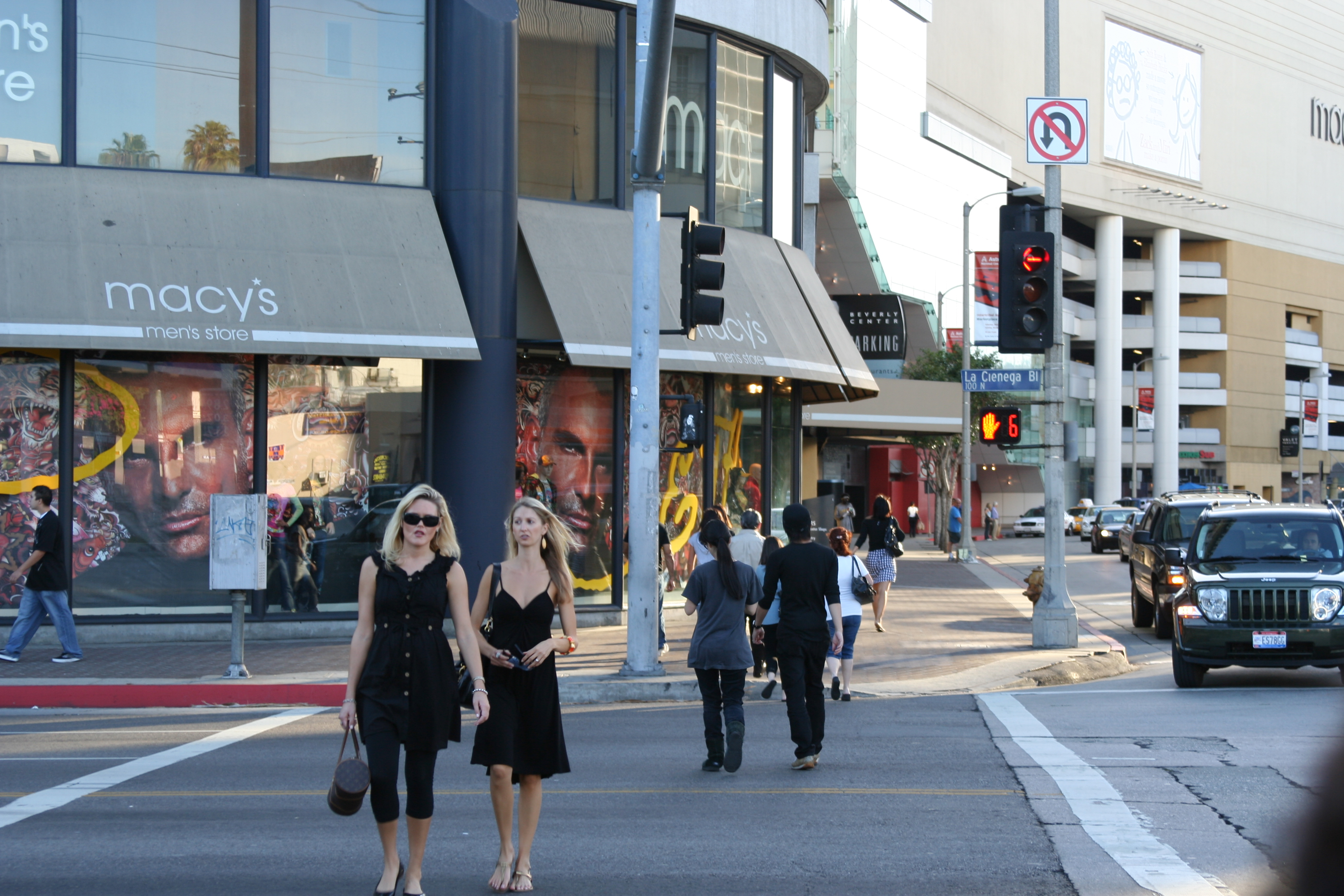
Intersection of La Cienega Boulevard and Beverly Boulevard. Possible station in Alt. 1

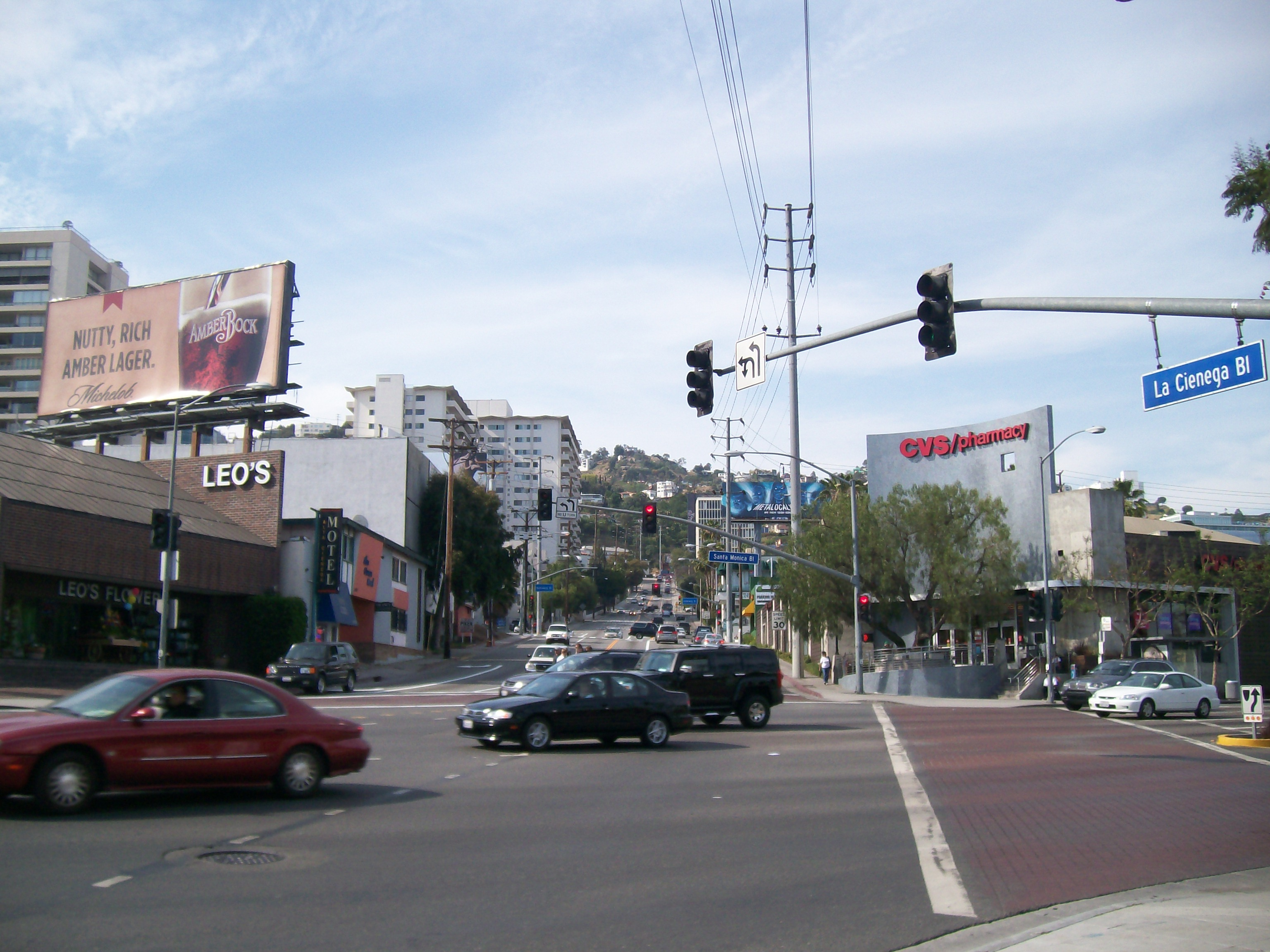
La Cienega Blvd. at Santa Monica Blvd. possible station for Alt. 1

Station Options (North to South)	Alt 1: H-SV	Alt 2: FF	Alt 3: LB	Connecting rail services	
Hollywood Bowl (optional)	check	check	check		Direct access to Hollywood Bowl. Added due to public comments.
Hollywood/Highland	check	check	check	B Line	Hollywood Boulevard Entertainment District, Dolby Theatre
La Brea/Santa Monica	check	check	check		West Hollywood Gateway shopping, The Lot (OWN), Jim Henson Company Lot, Desilu Studios & Sunset Las Palmas Studios nearby.
Fairfax/Santa Monica	check	check	-		West Hollywood
San Vicente/Santa Monica	check	-	-		West Hollywood Rainbow District, Pacific Design Center, The Troubadour
La Cienega/Beverly	check	-	-		Cedars-Sinai Medical Center, Beverly Center, Melrose Avenue Shopping District
Fairfax/3rd Street	check	check	-		The Grove at Farmers Market, Television City, Holocaust Museum LA
La Brea/Beverly	-	-	check		High-density neighborhood
Wilshire/Fairfax	check	check	-	D Line	Los Angeles County Museum of Art, Museum Row, High-density neighborhood and retail
Wilshire/La Brea	-	-	check	D Line	High density neighborhood and retail, Hancock Park
Midtown Crossing	check	check	check		Re-construct the former PE Pico/Rimpau "Vineyard Junction station; current Pico-Rimpau Bus Transfer Station at Mid-town Crossing Center
Crenshaw/Adams	check	check	check		Mid-Density neighborhood
Expo/Crenshaw	check	check	check	E Line	Continues south to LAX, the C Line and South Bay beach cities
Distance: Miles (Kilometers)	9.9 (15.9)	8.1 (13.0)	6.5 (10.5)		

The city council approved a resolution in May 2018 to expedite its environmental study to speed up the approval process with Metro. Metro's 2018 budget included $500,000 to begin the draft environmental study for the extension project. Residents created the "West Hollywood Advocates for Metro Rail" to advocate a new light rail or rapid transit line along Santa Monica Boulevard. Former President of the Los Angeles City Council Herb Wesson wrote an op-ed piece in the Los Angeles Times advocating acceleration of the project. Local Los Angeles U.S. representative Adam Schiff (now Senator) also voiced his support for acceleration in a letter to then Metro CEO Philip Washington in March 2019.

=== Route selected: Modified Alternative 1 ===
On March 26, 2026, the Metro board of directors approved Alternative 1 as the locally preferred alternative (LPA) at a board meeting. The alignment approved by the board includes a Hollywood Bowl station and a slightly modified tunnel alignment around Lafayette Square in response to community concerns. The extension will be constructed in phases – the segment between Expo/Crenshaw and Wilshire/Fairfax as an initial operating segment (IOS) and the segment north of Wilshire/Fairfax will at a future date. The approval is contingent upon the formation of an Enhanced Infrastructure Financing District (EIFD) by West Hollywood in coordination with Los Angeles County to accelerate construction on the project.

Phase	Date opening	Station	City/Neighborhood	Connecting services
Phase 2	TBA	Hollywood Bowl station	Hollywood (Los Angeles)	
Phase 2	TBA	Hollywood/Highland station	Hollywood (Los Angeles)	B Line
Phase 2	TBA	La Brea/Santa Monica station	West Hollywood	
Phase 2	TBA	Fairfax/Santa Monica station	West Hollywood	
Phase 2	TBA	San Vicente/Santa Monica station	West Hollywood	
Phase 2	TBA	La Cienega/Beverly station	Beverly Grove (Los Angeles)	
Phase 2	TBA	Fairfax/3rd Street station	Fairfax District (Los Angeles)	
Initial Operating Segment (IOS)	2047	Wilshire/Fairfax station	Miracle Mile (Los Angeles)	D Line
Initial Operating Segment (IOS)	2047	Midtown Crossing station	Mid-Wilshire (Los Angeles)	
Initial Operating Segment (IOS)	2047	Crenshaw/Adams station	West Adams (Los Angeles)	
Already built	October 7, 2022	Expo/Crenshaw station	Jefferson Park (Los Angeles)	E Line
