= Liberty Park (disambiguation) =

Liberty Park may refer to:

- Liberty Park (Salt Lake City), Utah, U.S.
- Liberty Park (Manhattan), New York, U.S.
- Liberty Park, Los Angeles, Koreatown, Los Angeles, U.S.
- Liberty Park, Camden, a neighborhood in New Jersey, U.S.
- Liberty Park (New Jersey) now called Liberty State Park, New Jersey, U.S.
  - Liberty State Park (HBLR station), a light rail station in Liberty State Park
  - Liberty Park 9/11 Memorial, a memorial in Liberty State Park
