= Wilshire/Normandie station =

Rapid transit station in Los Angeles, California

Wilshire/Normandie
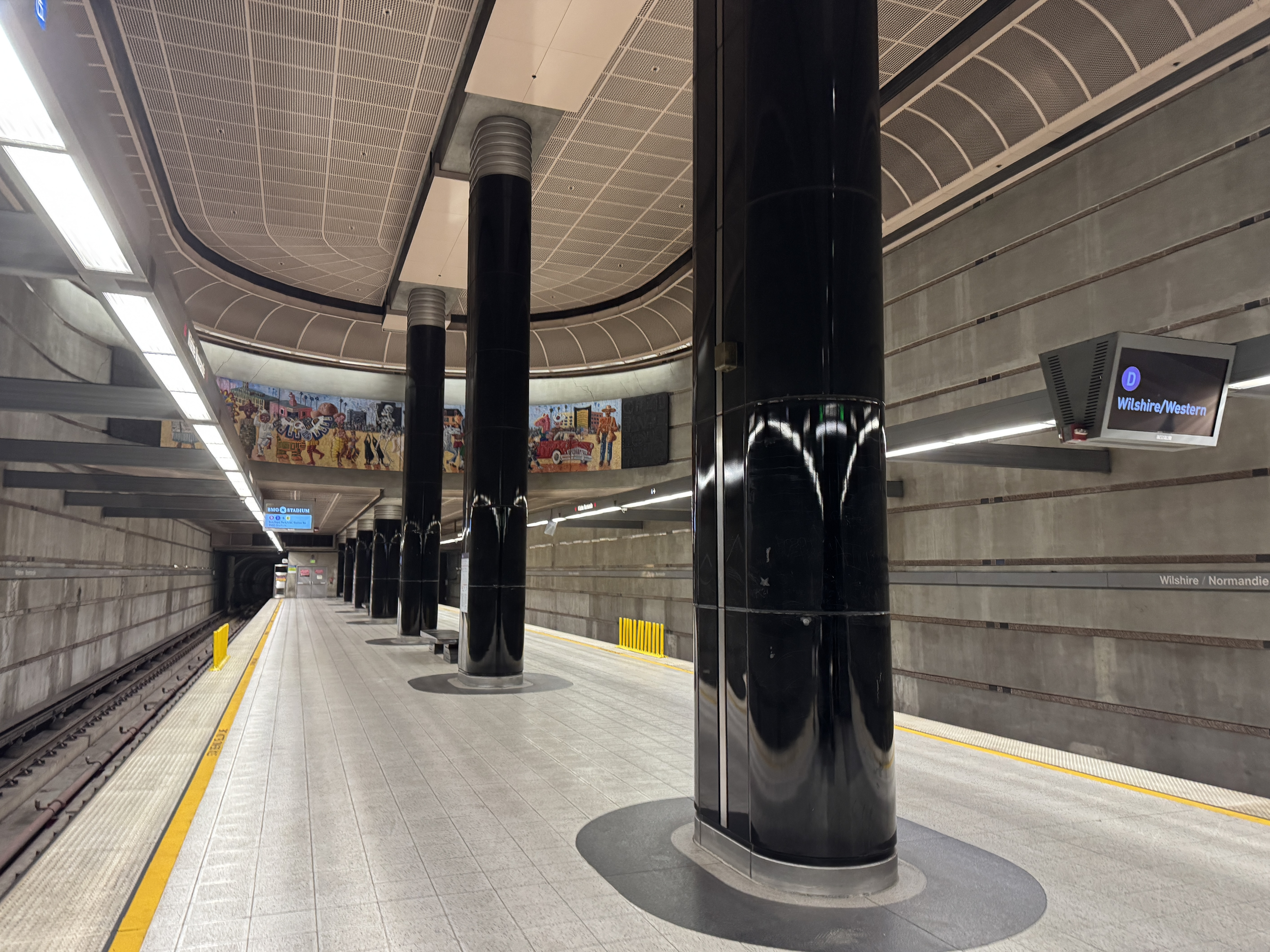
- Wilshire/Normandie station platform, July 2025

General information
- Location: 3510 Wilshire Boulevard; Los Angeles, California
- Coordinates: 34.0618°N 118.3002°W
- Owner: Los Angeles Metro
- Platforms: 1 island platform
- Tracks: 2
- Connections: Los Angeles Metro Bus

Construction
- Structure type: Underground
- Parking: Paid parking nearby
- Cycle facilities: Metro Bike Share station
- Accessible: Yes

History
- Opened: July 13, 1996; 30 years ago

Passengers
- FY 2025: 1,523 (avg. wkdy boardings)

Services
Preceding station	Metro Rail	Following station
Wilshire/Western toward Wilshire/La Cienega	D Line	Wilshire/Vermont toward Union Station
Location

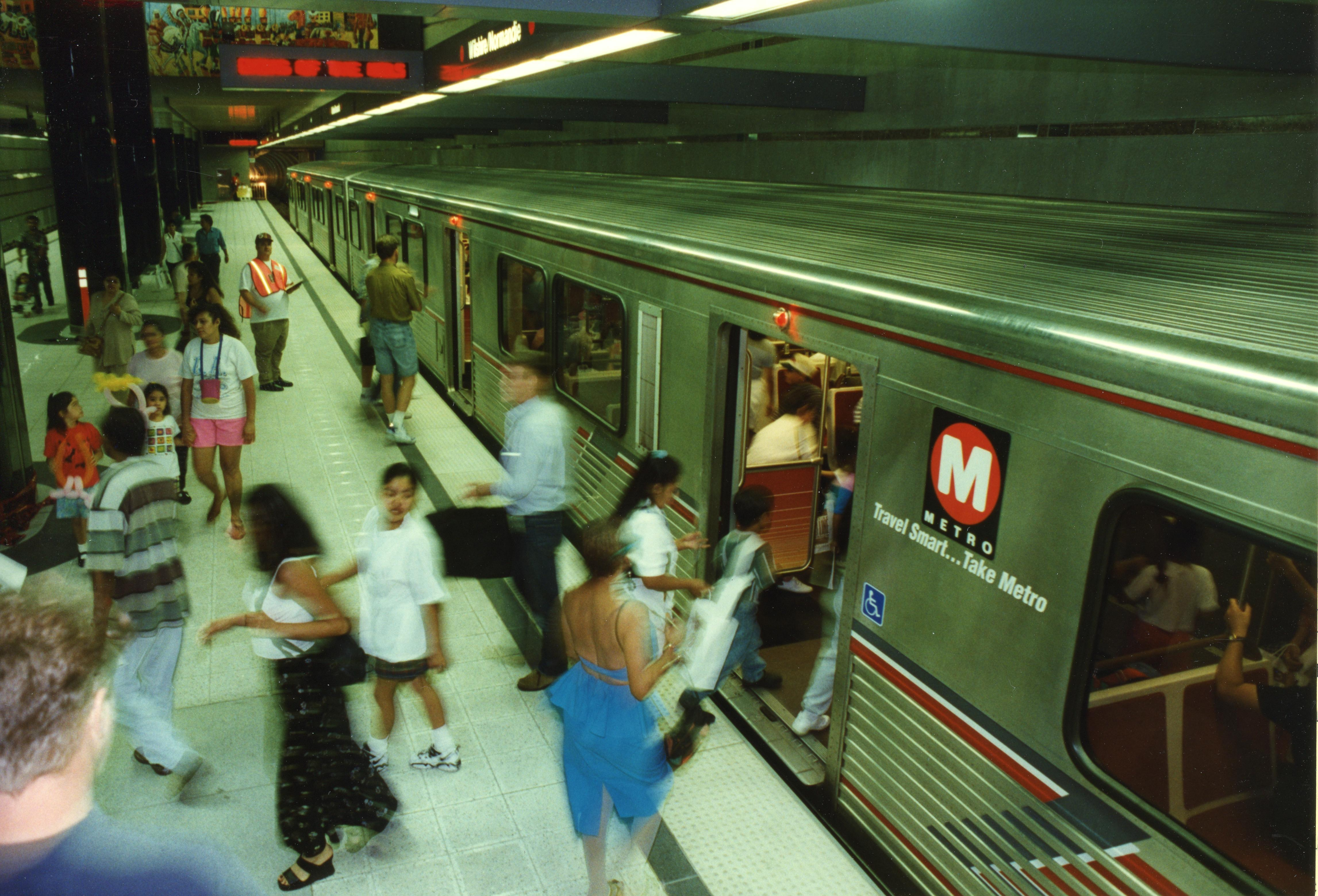
Opening day of the Metro extension to Wilshire (July 1996) at the Wilshire/Normandie Station

Wilshire/Normandie station is an underground rapid transit station on the D Line of the Los Angeles Metro Rail system. It is located under Wilshire Boulevard at Normandie Avenue, after which the station is named, in the Mid-Wilshire and Koreatown districts of Los Angeles.

Wilshire/Normandie is one of five D Line stations not shared with the B Line.

== Service ==
=== Hours and frequency ===
D Line trains run every day between approximately 5 a.m. and midnight. Trains operate every 10 minutes during peak hours. Early morning and night service is approximately every 20 minutes.

=== Connections ===
As of September 10, 2023, the following connections are available:

- Los Angeles Metro Bus: 18, 20, 206, Rapid 720

== Notable Places Nearby ==
- Consulate General of Burma, Peru, Indonesia, Kenya, Paraguay, Ecuador, Honduras and the Philippines.
- Robert F. Kennedy Community Schools, the former Ambassador Hotel.
- Seoul International Park
- Chapman Plaza
