= Wilshire/Fairfax station =

Rapid transit station in Los Angeles, California

Wilshire/Fairfax
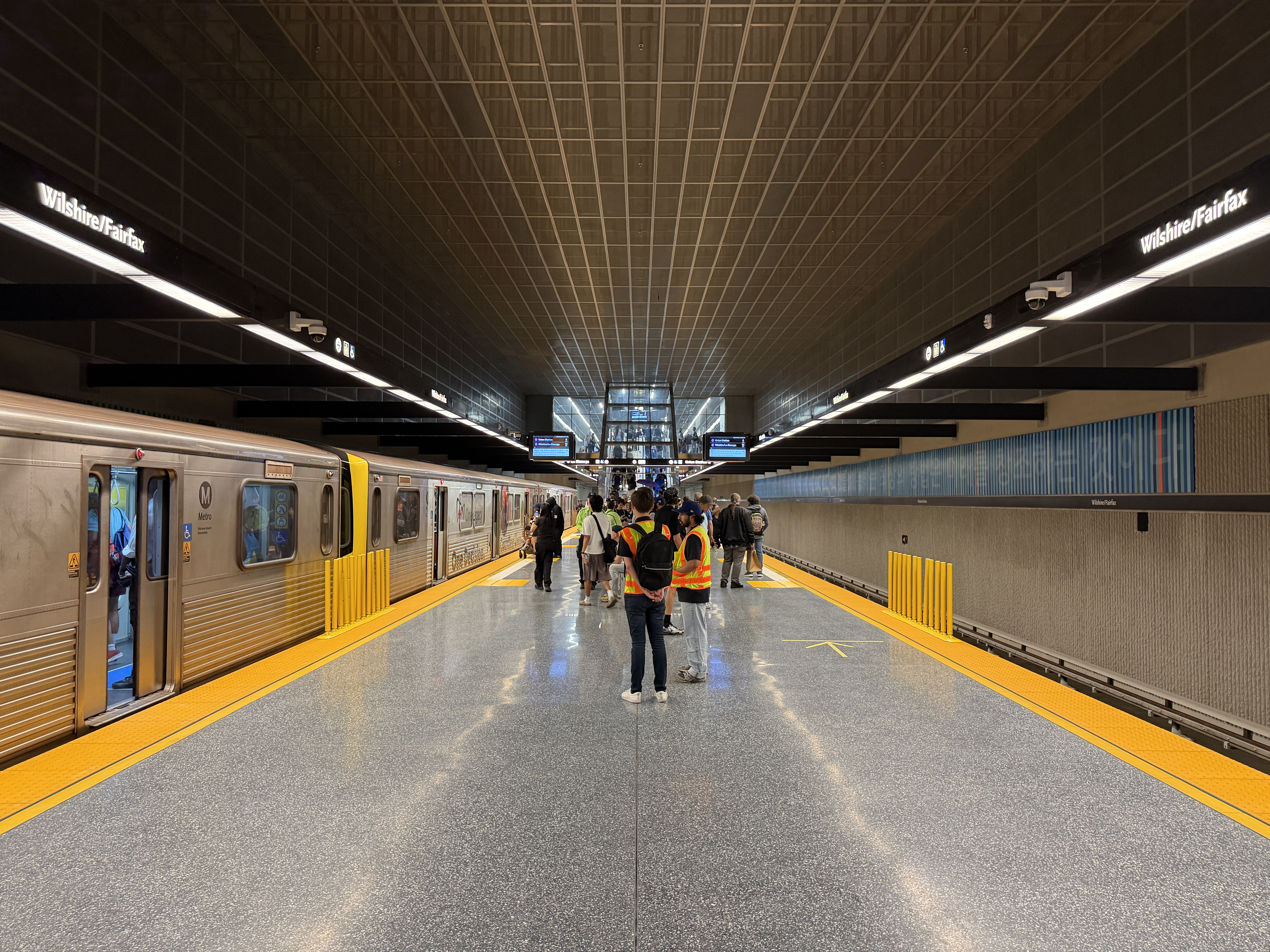
- Wilshire/Fairfax station platform, May 2026

General information
- Location: 6026 Wilshire Boulevard; Los Angeles, California
- Coordinates: 34°3′45″N 118°21′37″W
- Owner: Los Angeles Metro
- Platforms: 1 island platform
- Tracks: 2
- Connections: Antelope Valley Transit Authority; LADOT DASH; Los Angeles Metro Bus

Construction
- Accessible: Yes

History
- Opened: May 8, 2026; 5 months ago

Passengers
- FY 2026: 1,677 (avg. wkdy boardings)

Services
Preceding station	Metro Rail	Following station
Wilshire/La Cienega Terminus	D Line	Wilshire/La Brea toward Union Station
Location

Wilshire/Fairfax station is an underground rapid transit station on the D Line of the Los Angeles Metro Rail system in LA's Miracle Mile area along Wilshire Boulevard at its intersection with Fairfax Avenue. The station opened on May 8, 2026. It is served by the D Line and is the second station west of Wilshire/Western station.

== Service ==
=== Hours and frequency ===
D Line trains run every day between approximately 5 a.m. and midnight. Trains operate every 10 minutes during peak hours. Early morning and night service is approximately every 20 minutes.

=== Connections ===
As of May 8, 2026, the following connections are available:

- Antelope Valley Transit Authority: 786
- LADOT DASH: Fairfax
- Los Angeles Metro Bus: 20, 217, Rapid 720

== Station layout ==
The station is planned to become a transfer station with the K Line upon the opening of the initial operating segment (IOS) of its northern extension into Hollywood.

== Attractions ==
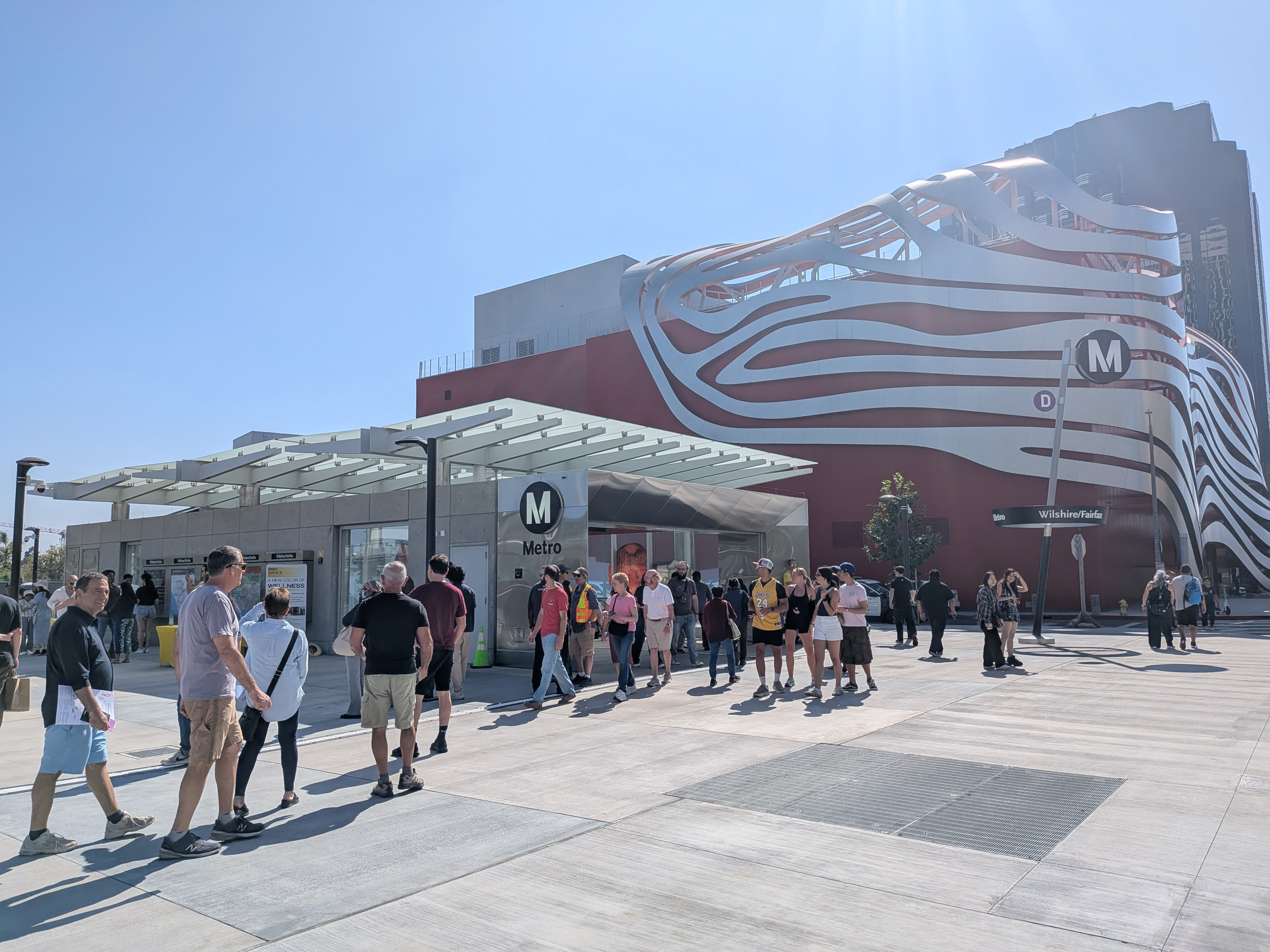
Entrance of the station with the Petersen Automotive Museum in the background.

- The station portal exits on Wilshire Boulevard's Miracle Mile area. It includes Museum Row and city park, Hancock Park.
  - Various museums and galleries surround the station, including the Los Angeles County Museum of Art (LACMA), the George C. Page Museum, 1301PE Gallery, the Sprüth Magers Gallery, the La Brea Tar Pits pavilions, the Petersen Automotive Museum, Craft Contemporary, and the Academy Museum of Motion Pictures.
- 5670 Wilshire Boulevard Building: Audacy, Inc., home of KCBS-FM, KFRG, KNX-FM, KRTH, and KTWV.
- 5757 Wilshire Boulevard Building: Known as SAG-AFTRA Plaza, headquarters of actors union.
- 5750 Wilshire Boulevard Building: Film Independent, Sony Pictures Animation
- Television City, Farmers Market, The Grove the Writers Guild of America West Library and Headquarters, Pan Pacific Park, and the Holocaust Museum LA are 0.62 mi (1.00 km) north on Fairfax Avenue (with third street).
- Consulates of Bangladesh, Belgium, Brazil, Chile, Egypt, Germany, Ireland, and South Africa.
- Little Ethiopia and Carthay Circle are 0.5 mi (0.80 km) south on Fairfax.

== Gallery ==
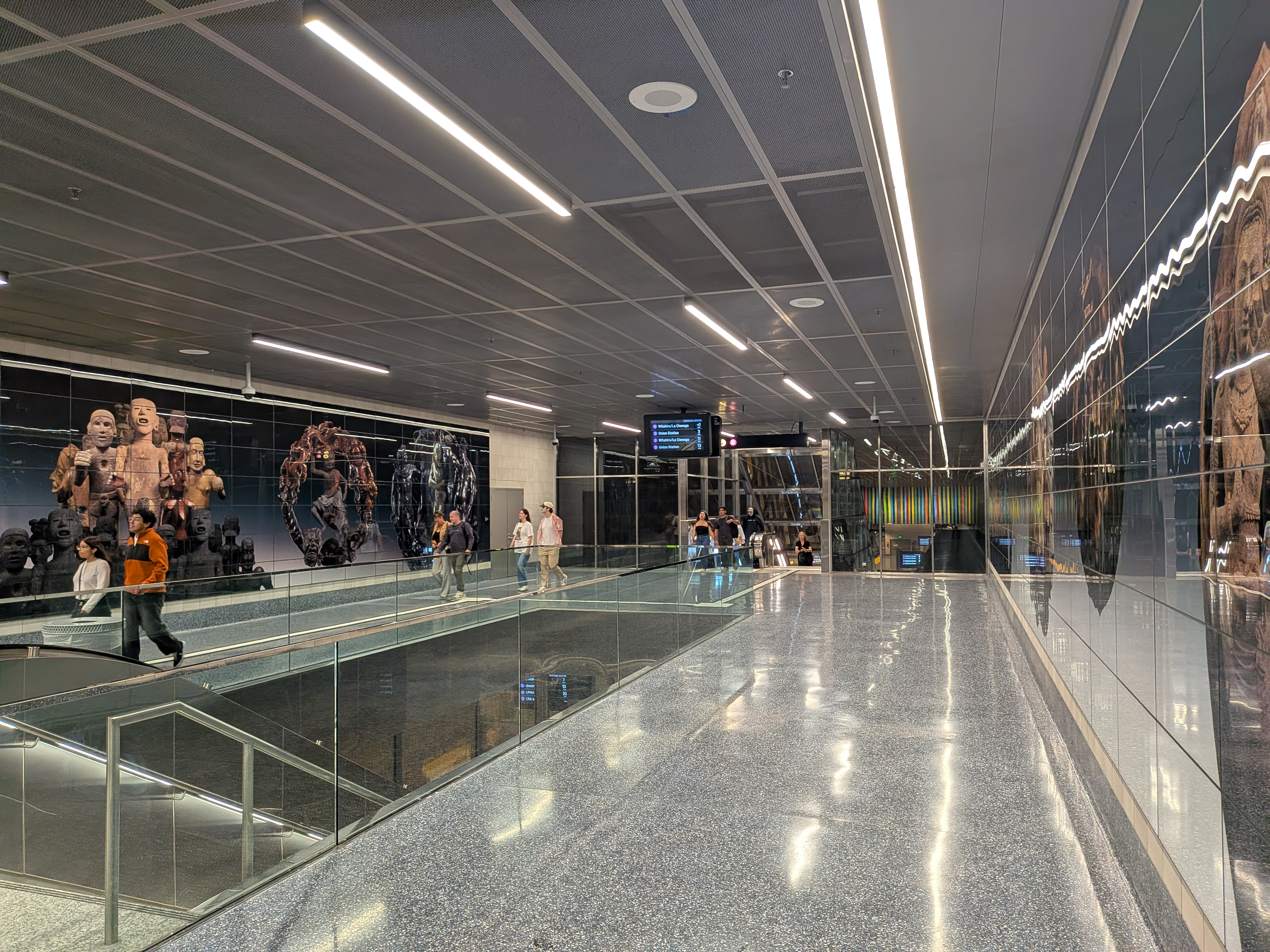
Station mezzanine

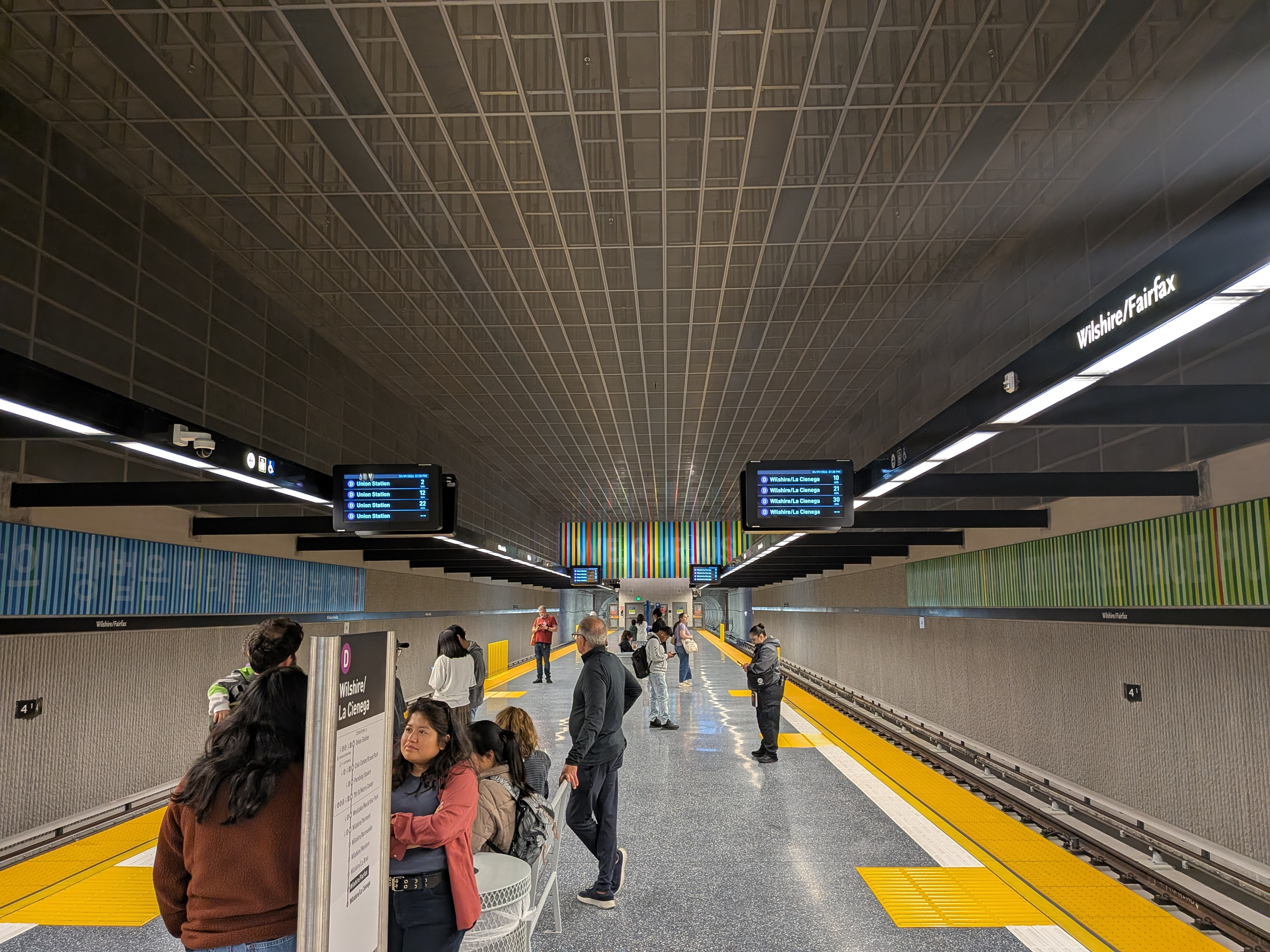
Station platform
