= Wilshire/Western station =

Rapid transit station in Los Angeles, California

Wilshire/Western
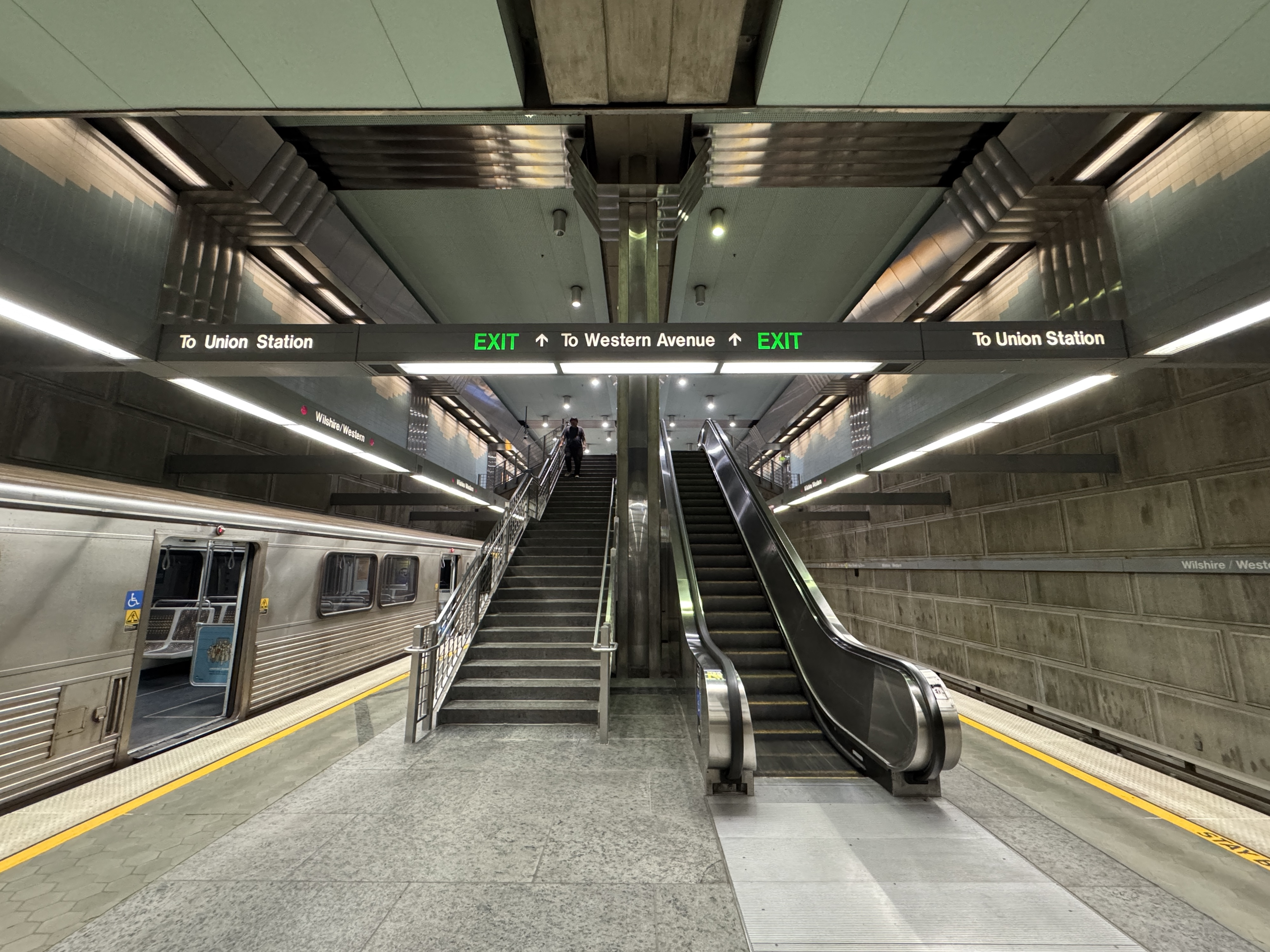
- Wilshire/Western station platform, July 2025

General information
- Other names: Wilshire/Western/Alfred Hoyun Song
- Location: 3775 Wilshire Boulevard; Los Angeles, California
- Coordinates: 34.0617°N 118.3091°W
- Owner: Los Angeles Metro
- Platforms: 1 island platform
- Tracks: 2
- Connections: Los Angeles Metro Bus; Big Blue Bus; LADOT DASH

Construction
- Structure type: Underground
- Cycle facilities: Metro Bike Share station, racks and lockers
- Accessible: Yes

History
- Opened: July 13, 1996; 30 years ago

Passengers
- FY 2026: 2,350 (avg. wkdy boardings)

Services
Preceding station	Metro Rail	Following station
Wilshire/La Brea toward Wilshire/La Cienega	D Line	Wilshire/Normandie toward Union Station
Location

Wilshire/Western station is an underground rapid transit station on the D Line of the Los Angeles Metro Rail system. It is located under Wilshire Boulevard at Western Avenue, after which the station is named, in the Mid-Wilshire and Koreatown districts of Los Angeles.

Prior plans called for the D Line to extend to Fairfax Avenue, then turn north into the San Fernando Valley but due to political disagreements, the line terminated here for 30 years, and the B Line travels to the Valley via Vermont Avenue. Metro is now currently constructing the D Line Extension to extend the D Line west from this station to Westwood/VA Hospital station in Westwood, near UCLA. Section 1 of the extension opened on May 8, 2026, extending the D Line to Wilshire/La Cienega station in Beverly Hills.

The two artwork installations at Wilshire/Western are called "People Coming", and the other "People Going". They are large murals at each end of the station. The artist responsible is Richard Wyatt, a Lynwood native.

The courtyard features a plaque commemorating former California Assembly member Alfred H. Song and is officially named "Wilshire/Western/Alfred Hoyun Song station," although the full name is not used on any station signs.

== Service ==
=== Hours and frequency ===
D Line trains run every day between approximately 5 a.m. and midnight. Trains operate every 10 minutes during peak hours. Early morning and night service is approximately every 20 minutes.

=== Connections ===
As of September 10, 2023, the following connections are available:

- Los Angeles Metro Bus: 18, 20, 66, 207, 210, Rapid 720
- Big Blue Bus (Santa Monica): 7
- LADOT DASH: Wilshire Center/Koreatown, Hollywood/Wilshire

== Notable places nearby ==
The station is within walking distance of the following notable places:

- Consulate General of Bolivia
- Getty House, official residence of the mayor of Los Angeles
- Los Altos Apartments
- Liberty Park
- Pellissier Building and Wiltern Theatre
- St. Basil Catholic Church
- St. Brendan Catholic Church
- Wilshire Boulevard Temple
