= Antelope Valley Transit Authority =

Public transit agency serving the Antelope Valley of California

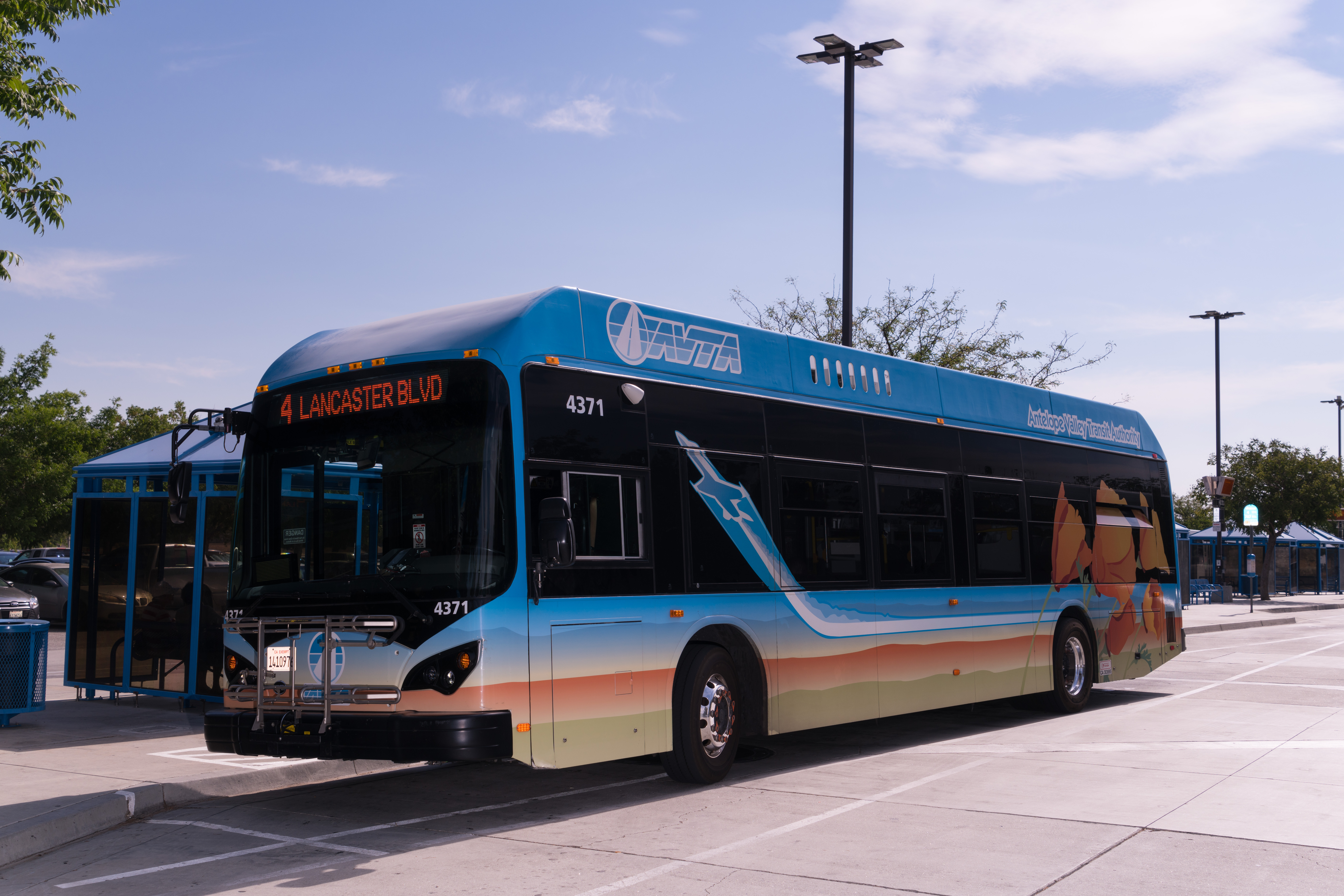
- The first all electric zero emission bus built in Lancaster, California; layover at Sgt. Steve Owen Memorial Park, July 13, 2017.
- Founded: 1992
- Locale: Antelope Valley, Los Angeles County, California, U.S.
- Service type: bus service, paratransit
- Alliance: Metro and Metrolink
- Routes: 20
- Fleet: 94 buses
- Daily ridership: 7,100 (weekdays, Q1 2026)
- Annual ridership: 1,960,400 (2025)
- Fuel type: Battery electric
- Operator: MV Transportation
- Website: www.avta.com

The Antelope Valley Transit Authority is the public transport agency serving the Antelope Valley region of northern Los Angeles County, California. AVTA operates local bus services in Lancaster and Palmdale, and commuter services to Los Angeles. In 2022, AVTA became the first transit authority in the United States to operate a fleet of all battery electric vehicles, including all buses and support vehicles.

The AVTA is structured as a joint powers authority under California law, governed by an appointed board of directors. Antelope Valley Transit Authority services are operated under contract by MV Transportation. In 2025, the system had a ridership of 1,960,400, or about 7,100 per weekday as of the first quarter of 2026.

== History ==
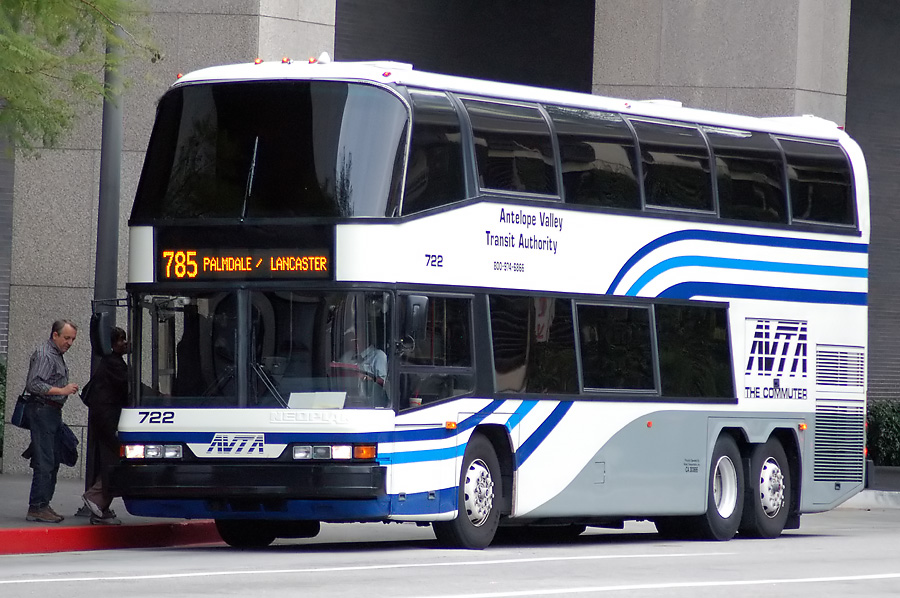
AVTA commuter bus in Downtown Los Angeles, 2008

The cities of Palmdale and Lancaster and the Los Angeles County Department of Public Works jointly created the Antelope Valley Transit Authority in 1992 to meet the growing need for public transportation in the Antelope Valley. AVTA began local transit service on July 1, 1992, with three types of services: Transit, Commuter and Dial-A-Ride. A fourth service, Access Services, was created in 1996 to provide the disabled with a local complementary paratransit service in line with the Americans with Disabilities Act. AVTA opened a larger facility in 2004 to accommodate increased demand.

On March 17, 2017, AVTA drivers struck. The dispute was between the driver's union Teamsters Local 848 and the system operator Transdev. After making their statement, the drivers elected to return to service by March 19 while negotiations between the parties continued. However the drivers went on strike again, May 3 was the third walkout which lasted at least a week. As the dispute continued, drivers were locked out on August 22.

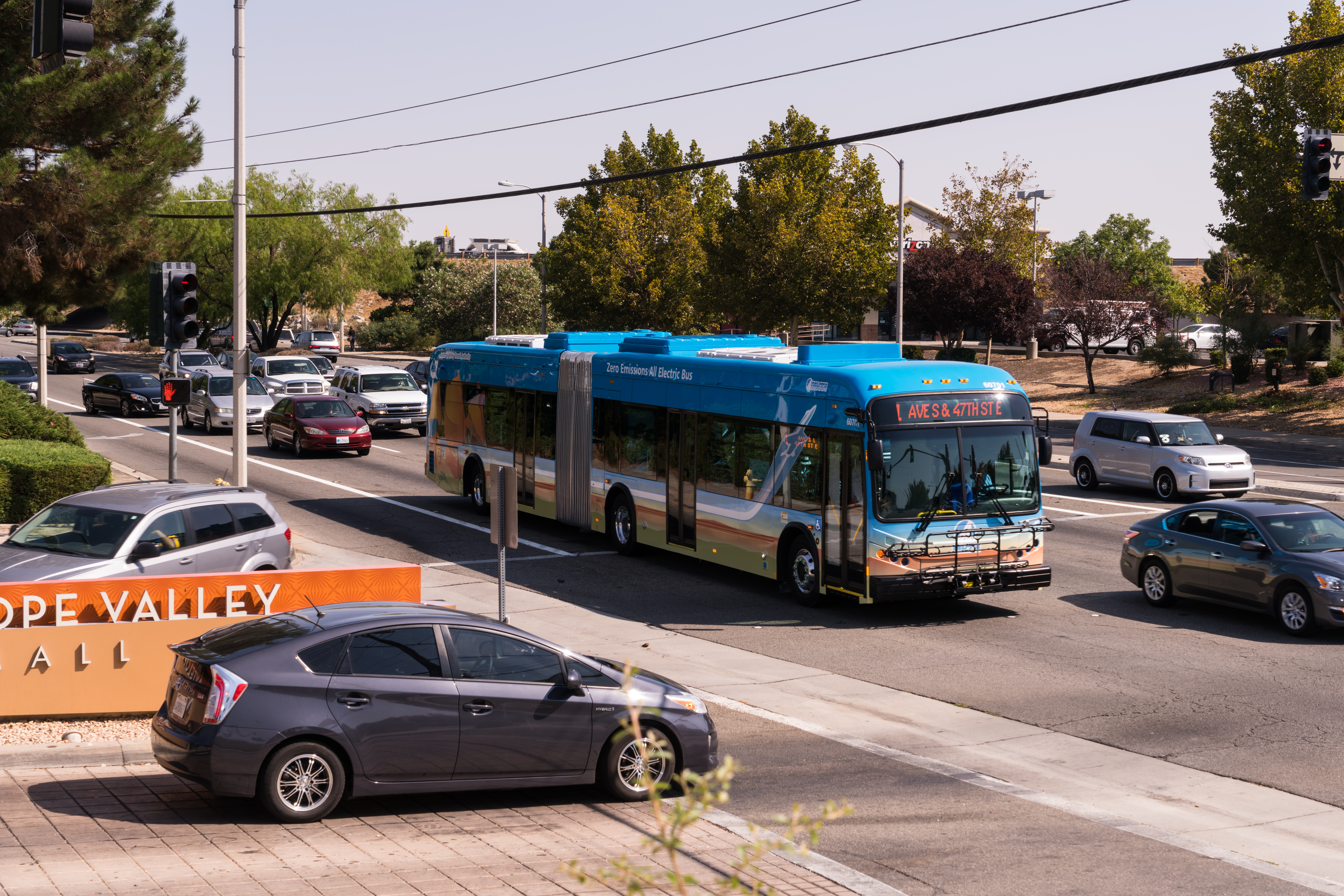
AVTA BYD K11M electric articulated bus, 2017

In 2017, AVTA became the first transit agency in the United States to operate a 60-foot, articulated electric bus, manufactured by BYD in Lancaster.

In 2018, the Antelope Valley Transit Authority began to charge its electric buses on special wireless charging pads located along bus routes.

In January 2019, AVTA began commuter service to Edwards Air Force Base. Later that year, AVTA celebrated two significant milestones in its conversion to an all-electric fleet, achieving both a one million (May), then two million (December), zero emission miles driven. The service has been suspended since the start of the pandemic.

In May 2022, AVTA drivers struck. The dispute was about unfair labor practices with Teamsters Union 848 and Transdev. The contract expired and MV Transportation took over operations as of June 2022.

== Routes ==
=== Local routes ===
Route	Terminals		Via	Notes
1	Lancaster; The Boulevard Transit Center	Palmdale; South Valley Transit Center	10th St West	Serves Owen Memorial Park, Antelope Valley Mall and Palmdale Transportation Center Palmdale/Lancaster
2	Palmdale; Antelope Valley Mall	Palmdale; South Valley Transit Center	Avenue R	Serves Palmdale Regional Medical Center, Antelope Valley Mall
3	Palmdale; Antelope Valley Mall	Palmdale; South Valley Transit Center	Avenue S	Serves Palmdale Transportation Center, Antelope Valley Mall
4	Lancaster; The Boulevard Transit Center	Lancaster; Owen Memorial Park	Lancaster Blvd/Avenue K	serves Eastside Lancaster, Downtown Lancaster
5	Palmdale; 67th St East & Ave L-15 (Mayflower Gardens)	Lancaster; Owen Memorial Park	Avenue L	serves Quartz Hill, Westside Lancaster
7	Palmdale; Palmdale Transportation Center	Lancaster; The Boulevard Transit Center	Rancho Vista Blvd.	Serves Antelope Valley Mall, Antelope Valley College, Lancaster Metrolink Station and Quartz Hill
8	Lancaster; Antelope Valley College	Palmdale; Palmdale Bl & 25th St	Sierra Hwy	Serves Palmdale Transportation Center, AVC Palmdale/Lancaster Campuses
9	Lancaster; Owen Memorial Park	Lancaster; Quartz Hill	Avenue I/60th Street West	Serves Lancaster Metrolink Station, Quartz Hill
11	Lancaster; Owen Memorial Park	Lancaster; Avenue J & 20th St East	Avenue I	Serves Westside/Eastside Lancaster
12	Lancaster; Owen Memorial Park	Lancaster; Avenue J & 20th St East	Avenue J	Serves Antelope Valley College, Westside/Eastside Lancaster
50	Lancaster; Owen Memorial Park	Lake Los Angeles; 170th St & Avenue O (Town Center Plaza)	Avenue K/170th Street East	Serves Lancaster/Lake Los Angeles
51	Palmdale; Palmdale Transportation Center	Lake Los Angeles; 170th St & Avenue O (Town Center Plaza)	Palmdale Blvd./170th Street East	Serves Palmdale/Lake Los Angeles
52	Palmdale; South Valley Transit Center	Pearblossom; Avenue V-10 & 121st St	Pearblossom Hwy	Serves Palmdale/Sun Village/Littlerock/Pearblossom

=== School Tripper routes ===
Services operate weekdays only.

Route	Terminals		Via	Notes
94	Lancaster; Owen Memorial Park	Lancaster; Antelope Valley High School	Avenue K	Serves Eastside HS, Eastside Lancaster
97	Lancaster; Quartz Hill High School	Palmdale; Palmdale Transportation Center	Rancho Vista Blvd.	Serves Quartz Hill, Palmdale
98	Palmdale; Knight High School	Palmdale; Palmdale Transportation Center	Avenue Q, Avenue S	Serves Eastside Palmdale

=== Commuter Express routes ===
Commuter services operate weekdays only in the peak direction.

Route	Terminals		Via	Notes
785	Lancaster; Owen Memorial Park	Downtown LA; LA Union Station	I-5, SR 14, US 101	Serves the Palmdale Transportation Center, Civic Center/Grand Park and Grand Avenue Arts/Bunker Hill station
786	Lancaster; Owen Memorial Park	Hollywood; Hollywood and Highland	SR 14, I-405	Serves the Palmdale Transportation Center, UCLA, Century City and Beverly Hills; One trip serves West Los Angeles VA Medical Center; Includes stops at the Hollywood/Highland, Wilshire/La Brea, Wilshire/Fairfax and Wilshire/La Cienega subway stations.
787	Lancaster; Owen Memorial Park	Tarzana; Ventura Bl & Reseda Bl	SR 14, SR 118	Serves Palmdale Transportation Center, Cal State Northridge, Northridge Fashion Center, Canoga station and Warner Center station
790	Palmdale; Palmdale Transportation Center	Santa Clarita; Newhall station	SR 14	Designed to fill in gaps in the Antelope Valley Line service

== Bus fleet ==
=== Fixed-Route fleet ===
Accurate as of July 2025.

Make/Model	Fleet numbers	Year	Notes
BYD K7M-ER	30301-30308	2023	
BYD K8M	35301-35303	2023	
BYD K9S	35601-35603	2016	Ex-LINK Transit 808, 810-811
BYD K9S	35604	2017	Ex-LINK Transit 812
BYD K9	40450-40451	2013	
BYD K9M	40089-40090	2020	
BYD K9M	40301-40310	2023	
BYD K9M	40856-40875	2018	
BYD K9M	407L1-407L3	2017	
BYD K9M	40976-40988	2019	
MCI D45 CRT LE CHARGE	45101-45124	2021	Used on Commuter Express routes
BYD K11M	60314-60318	2023	
BYD K11M	60701-60705, 60707-60711	2017	
BYD K11M	60906, 60912-60913	2017	

=== Microtransit fleet ===
Make/Model	Fleet numbers	Year	Notes
GreenPower EV Star	27901-27908	2019	Used for On-Request Microtransit Ride Service

== Fares ==
Base adult fare for AVTA trips is $1.50. Senior citizens, people with disabilities, active military, and veterans may ride AVTA local buses free of charge with proper ID. Up to 4 children up to 44 inches tall may ride with an adult free of charge.
