= Normandie Avenue =

Street in Los Angeles County, California, USA

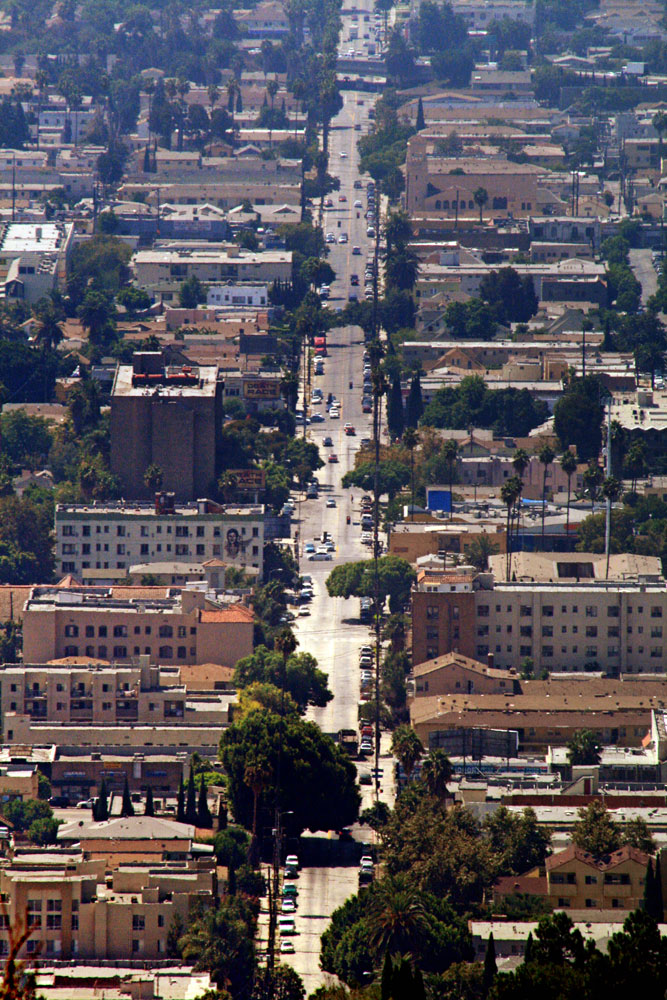
- North Normandie Avenue from Griffith Park Observatory
- Former name: Rosedale Avenue
- Length: 22.5 mi (36.2 km)
- Location: Los Angeles County, California, United States
- Nearest metro station: Wilshire/Normandie
- South end: Vermont Avenue in Harbor City; 33.7861°N 118.2970°W
- Major junctions: SR 1 in Harbor City; I-405 in Harbor Gateway; I-10 in Jefferson Park; US 101 / SR 2 in Hollywood
- North end: Ambrose Avenue in Los Feliz; 34.1084°N 118.3003°W

Normandie Avenue is one of Los Angeles County's longest north–south streets, with a stretch of about 22.5 miles (36.2 km). It lies between Western Avenue to the west and Vermont Avenue to the east. The avenue begins in the south by branching off from Vermont Avenue south of Pacific Coast Highway in Harbor City. Through traffic on Normandie is directed onto Irolo Street between just north of Olympic Boulevard and Wilshire Boulevard; in this section, Normandie exists as a small residential street. After crossing Franklin Avenue, Normandie resumes as a residential street before reaching its northern terminus at Ambrose Avenue in the Los Feliz district of Los Angeles.

== History ==
Normandie was originally named Rosedale Avenue until 1900. The intersection of Florence and Normandie is noted for its involvement in the 1992 Los Angeles riots.

The street has since been redeveloped.

== Transportation ==
Metro Local line: 206 and Gardena Transit line 2 operate on Normandie Avenue: Metro Local Line 206 runs between Hollywood Boulevard and Imperial Highway and Gardena line 2 between 182nd Street and Pacific Coast Highway.

A subway station is served by the Metro D Line at its intersection with Wilshire Boulevard.

== Landmarks ==
Several Los Angeles Historic-Cultural Monuments are located on Normandie: Saint Sophia Cathedral, Wilshire Christian Church Building, Normandie Hotel, John Anson Ford Residence, Cadet Records, and Chateau La Martine.

Other notable landmarks on Normandie include Harbor-UCLA Medical Center, Gardena High School, Rosedale Cemetery, and Sammy Lee Square.
