= La Brea Avenue =

Thoroughfare in Los Angeles, USA

- Interactive map of La Brea Avenue
- Maintained by: Bureau of Street Services, City of L.A. DPW
- Length: 21 miles (34 km)
- Nearest metro station: : Wilshire/La Brea; Expo/La Brea; Downtown Inglewood
- South end: Century Boulevard
- Major junctions: I-10 in Mid-City
- North end: Franklin Avenue in Hollywood

La Brea Avenue is a prominent north-south thoroughfare in the City of Los Angeles and in Los Angeles County, California. It is known for having diverse ethnic communities, and many shops and restaurants along its route.

== History ==
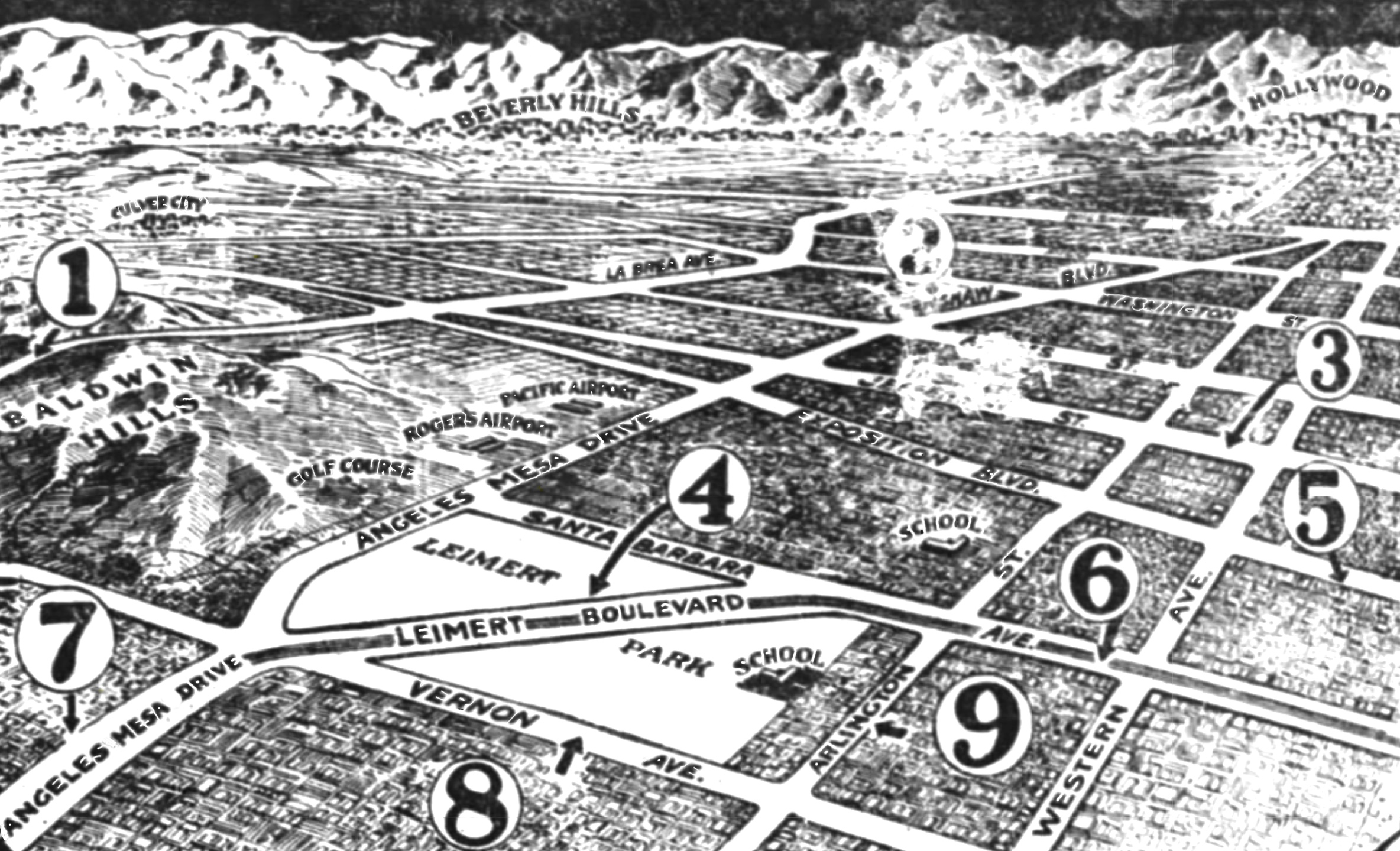
1927 Los Angeles Times map shows (1) the proposed extension of a 100-foot-wide La Brea Avenue between Jefferson Street through the Baldwin Hills toward Inglewood

La Brea is the Spanish phrase meaning "the tar." The La Brea Tar Pits, which the 1828 Mexican land grant Rancho La Brea was named for, are to the west of its intersection with Wilshire Boulevard in the Mid-Wilshire area.

In its early history, its northern section followed Arroyo La Brea, a former creek fed by springs in the Santa Monica Mountains that flowed south into Ballona Creek. Originally the southern section of La Brea Avenue within Inglewood was named Commercial Street.

== Route ==
La Brea is a continuation of Hawthorne Boulevard in the South Bay area of Los Angeles County. South of Century Boulevard, the street is named Hawthorne Boulevard; north of Century Boulevard it is named La Brea Avenue.

From Century Boulevard heading north, La Brea goes through the city of Inglewood. Crossing Slauson Avenue, La Brea ascends the Baldwin Hills mountain range upwards to the neighborhoods of View Park-Windsor Hills and Baldwin Hills. As it descends the hill and heads into Central Los Angeles, it passes by Kenneth Hahn State Recreation Area and the Inglewood Oil Field.

At the base of the hill, La Brea passes through the Baldwin Village and Baldwin Vista neighborhoods. It then goes through the Mid-City, Mid-City West and Hancock Park neighborhoods. At Santa Monica Boulevard, La Brea is the dividing border between West Hollywood and the city of Los Angeles.

The northern end of the avenue is just north of Franklin Avenue, at the foot of the Hollywood Hills in central Hollywood.

== Transportation ==
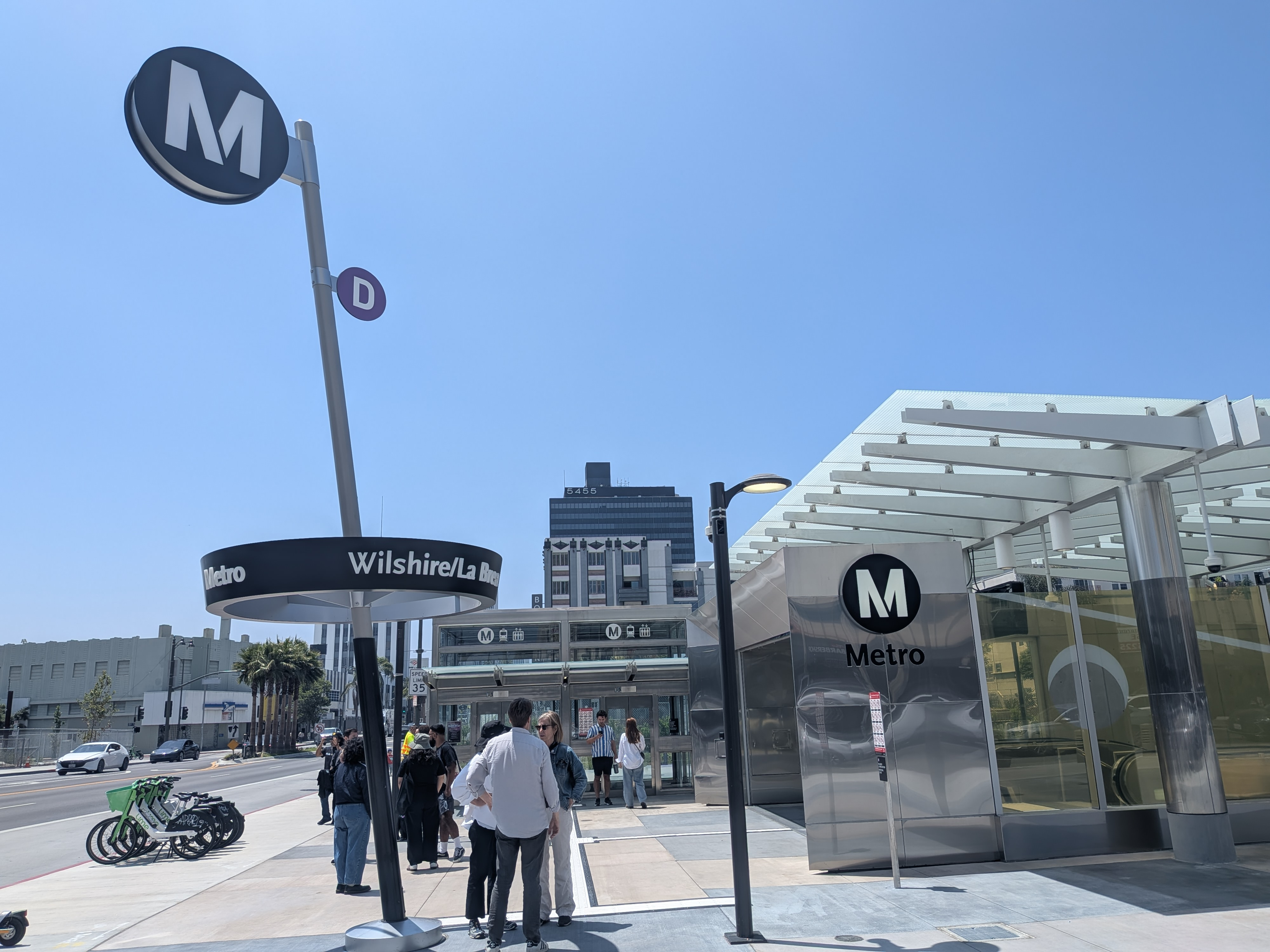
Entrance to the Wilshire/La Brea station.

- Metro Local bus lines 40 and 212 operate on La Brea Avenue. Line 212 serves the majority of La Brea Avenue and Line 40 starts at Florence Avenue.
- Metro D Line - An underground station for the Metro D Line is located at Wilshire Boulevard and La Brea.
- Metro E Line - An elevated light rail station is located at the intersection with Exposition Boulevard.

== Landmarks ==
- Charlie Chaplin Studios — 1416 N. La Brea Avenue. It is Los Angeles Historic-Cultural Monument #58. In 1917, it opened as Chaplin Studios. In 1966 it became the home of A&M Records. In 2000, it became the home of the Jim Henson Comapny. In 2026, it reverted back to the name Chaplin Studios.
- La Brea Bakery - 624 S La Brea Avenue.
- Pink's Hot Dogs — 709 North La Brea Avenue.
- Ray Charles Post Office — - 4960 West Washington Boulevard (at Washington and La Brea).
- Woman's Club of Hollywood — 1749 North La Brea Avenue.
