= Liberty Park (Los Angeles) =

Private park in Los Angeles, California, United States

Coordinates: 34.0613°N 118.3072°W

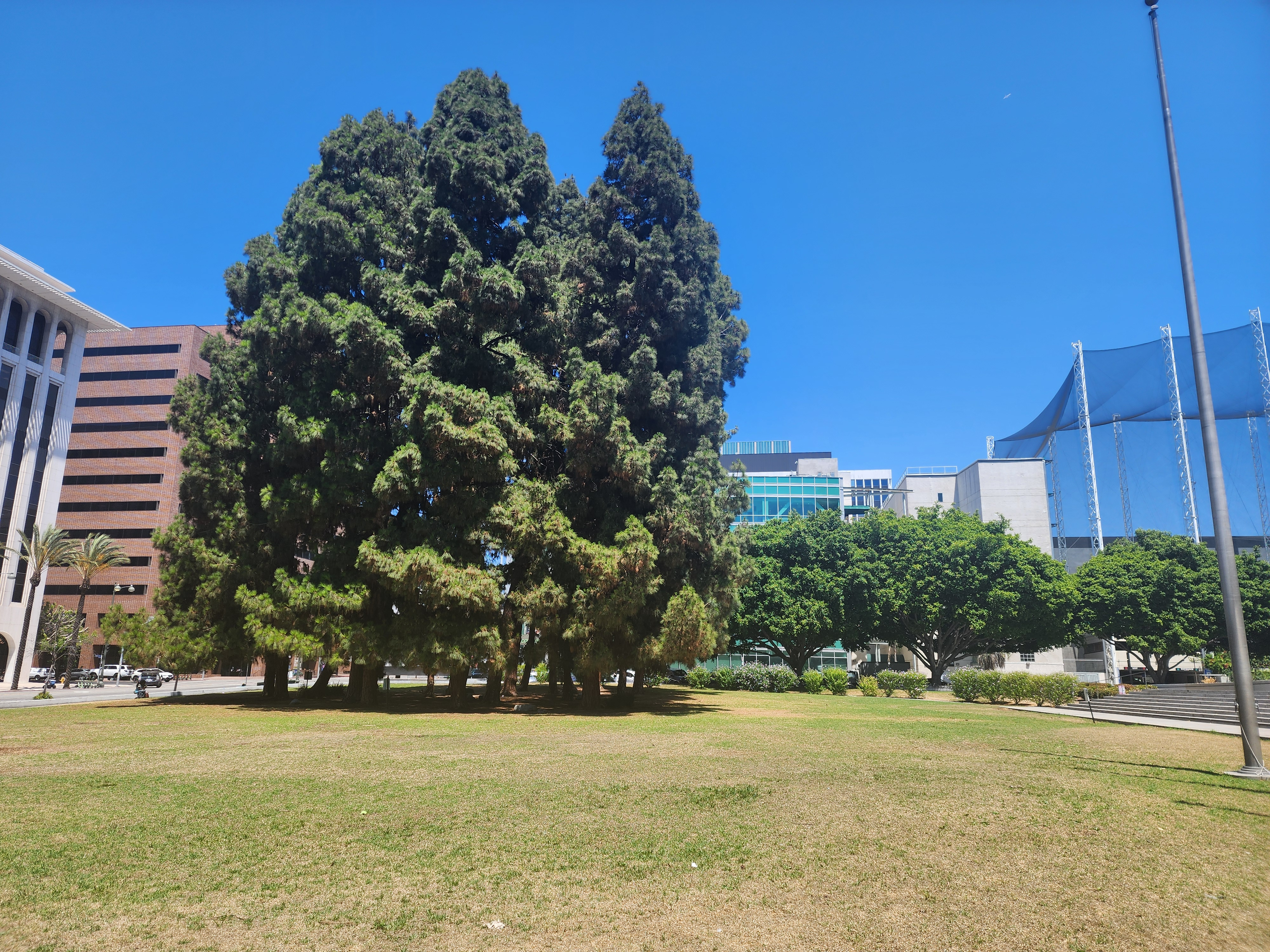
Liberty Park, July 2025

Liberty Park is a private park in Los Angeles, CA. It is located on Wilshire Boulevard in the Koreatown Neighborhood. It is now considered a L.A. City Cultural Monument.

== History ==
The park was created when the Mitchell Family of Beneficial Insurance Group developed the lot between Oxford and Serrano Avenues at 3700 Wilshire Boulevard with an 11-story building in 1967. It became their headquarters named Beneficial Plaza, now renamed Wilshire Park Place. The building was set back, away from Wilshire blvd creating a half-acre park facing Wilshire boulevard as open green space.

The park become a city Historical Monument as the lot owners wanted to replace the park with a 36-story residential tower. Due to neighborhood opposition, the Los Angeles City council issued the landmark status in March 2018. The park is a popular gathering site in Los Angeles. Festivals, street markets and recently has become a popular viewing area / public Square for World Cup matches, specifically for Korean Americans as Radio Korea (Los Angeles)|Radio Korea is headquartered at Wilshire Park Place building.

== Description ==
The park is a half acre grass field. The southern end has a stairs leading up to a stage like enclave to the Wilshire Place Plaza building. The site has various pine trees and seating benches on the north corners. The park is adjacent to the Wiltern Theater and Metros purple line on the west. Access is available thru the Wilshire/Western D Line station. On the east, it's adjacent to the Wilshire Boulevard Temple. Various consulates surround the park, including Taiwan, Bolivia, Indonesia, and Ecuador, among others.
