= Wilshire/La Brea station =

Rapid transit station in Los Angeles, California

Wilshire/La Brea
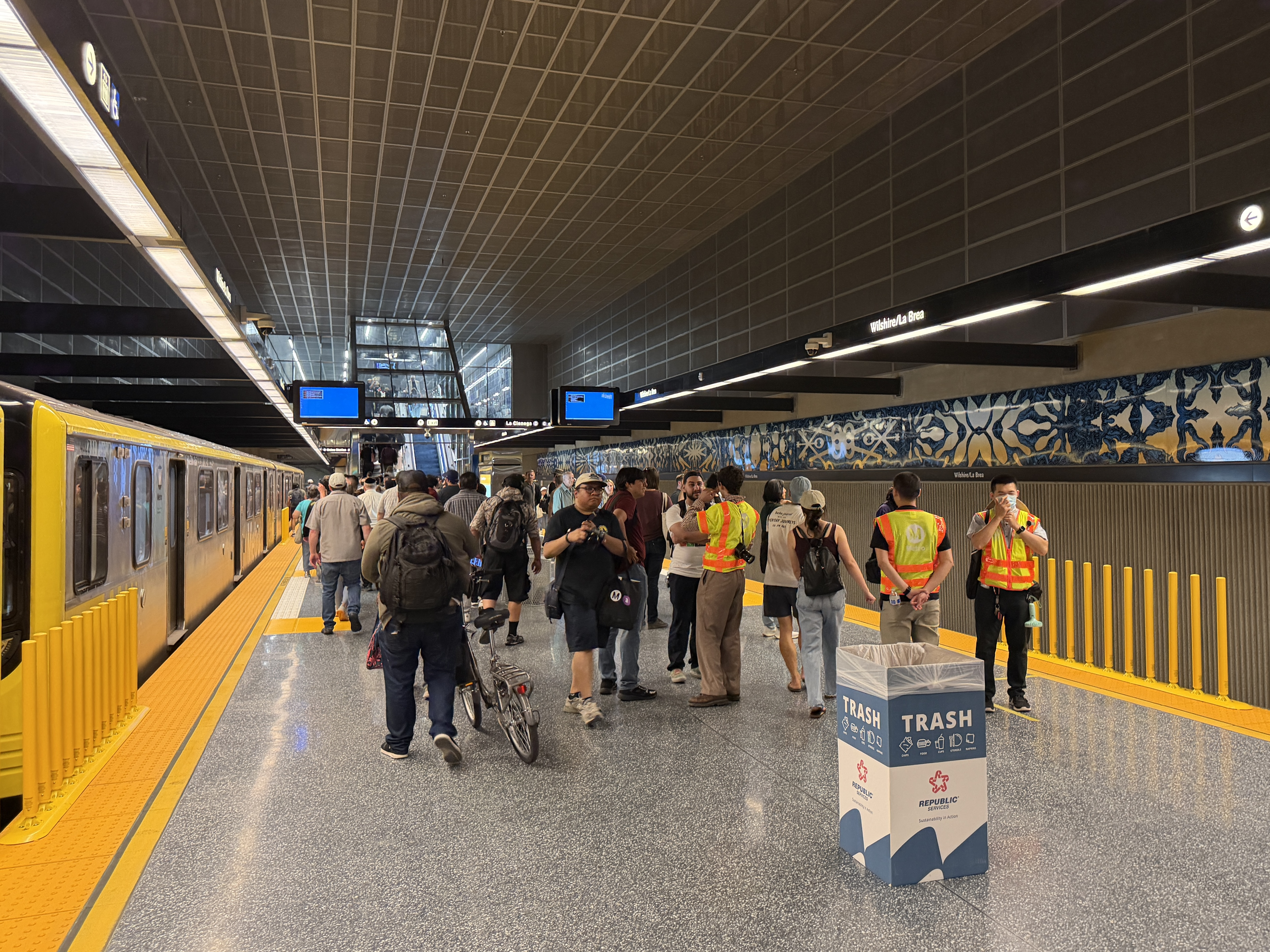
- Wilshire/La Brea station platform, May 2026

General information
- Location: 5300 Wilshire Boulevard; Los Angeles, California
- Coordinates: 34°3′45″N 118°20′40″W
- Owner: Los Angeles Metro
- Platforms: 1 island platform
- Tracks: 2
- Connections: Antelope Valley Transit Authority; LADOT DASH; Los Angeles Metro Bus

Construction
- Structure type: Underground
- Accessible: Yes

History
- Opened: May 8, 2026; 6 months ago

Passengers
- FY 2026: 1,353 (avg. wkdy boardings)

Services
Preceding station	Metro Rail	Following station
Wilshire/Fairfax toward Wilshire/La Cienega	D Line	Wilshire/Western toward Union Station
Location

Wilshire/La Brea station is an underground rapid transit station on the D Line of the Los Angeles Metro Rail system at the intersection of Wilshire Boulevard and La Brea Avenue. It opened on May 8, 2026. A part of Section 1 of the D Line Extension, it is the first station on the D Line west of its former terminus at Wilshire/Western station.

== Service ==
=== Hours and frequency ===
D Line trains run every day between approximately 5 a.m. and midnight. Trains operate every 10 minutes during peak hours. Early morning and night service is approximately every 20 minutes.

=== Connections ===
As of May 8, 2026, the following connections are available:

- Antelope Valley Transit Authority: 786
- LADOT DASH: Fairfax
- Los Angeles Metro Bus: 20, 212, Rapid 720

== Station layout ==
The station opened on May 8, 2026.

During construction, the tunnel boring machines were launched from this station and dug the tunnels east to Wilshire/Western station, then flipped around and returned and launched west to Wilshire/Fairfax station.

== Nearby attractions ==
- Consulates of Argentina, Belize, Iraq and Spain
- El Rey Theatre
- Ebell of Los Angeles Theater
- Marciano Art Foundation, TAG Gallery, Korean Cultural Center, Lebanese American Cultural Center
- Spanish Broadcasting System

== Gallery ==
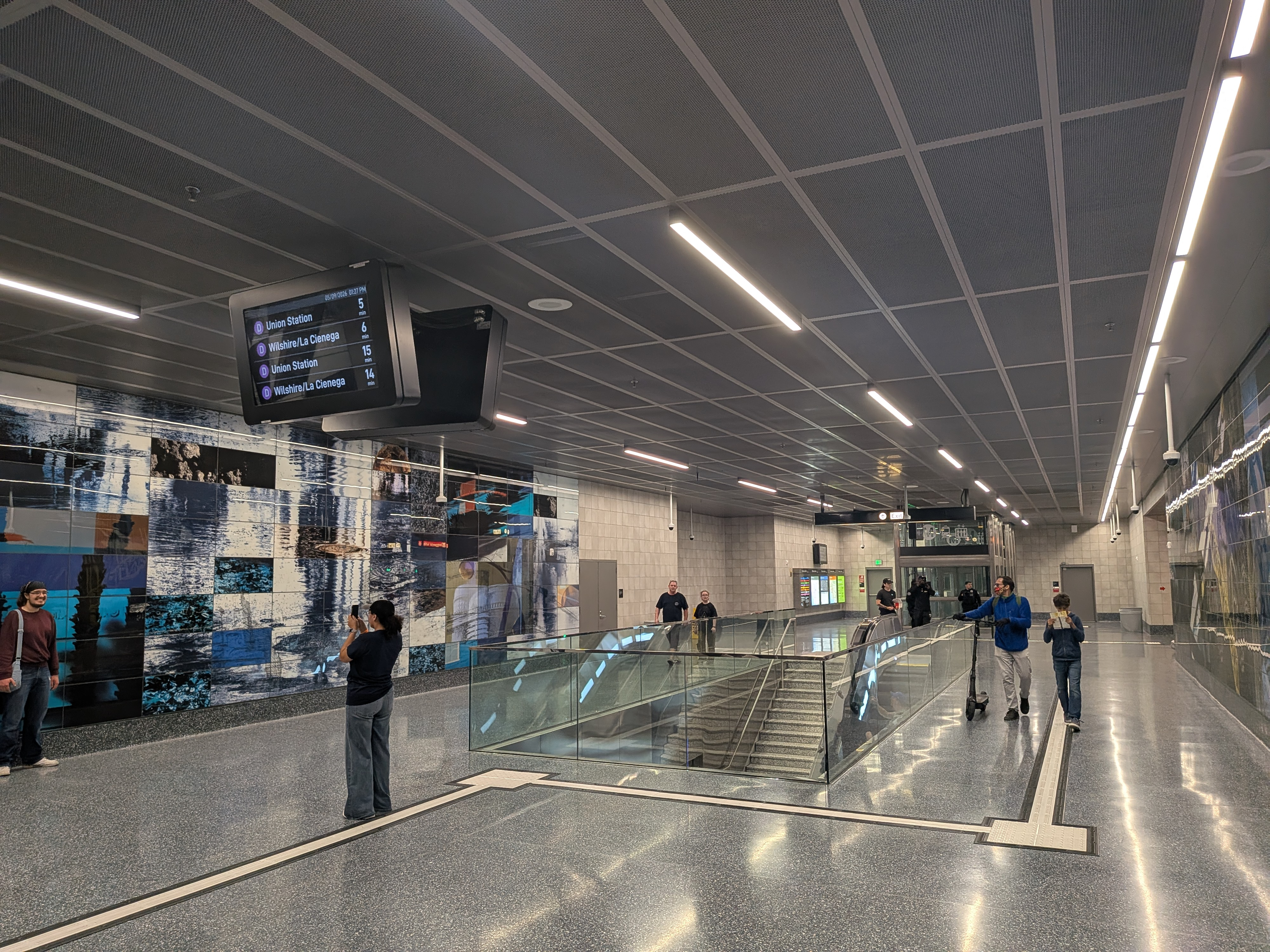
Station mezzanine

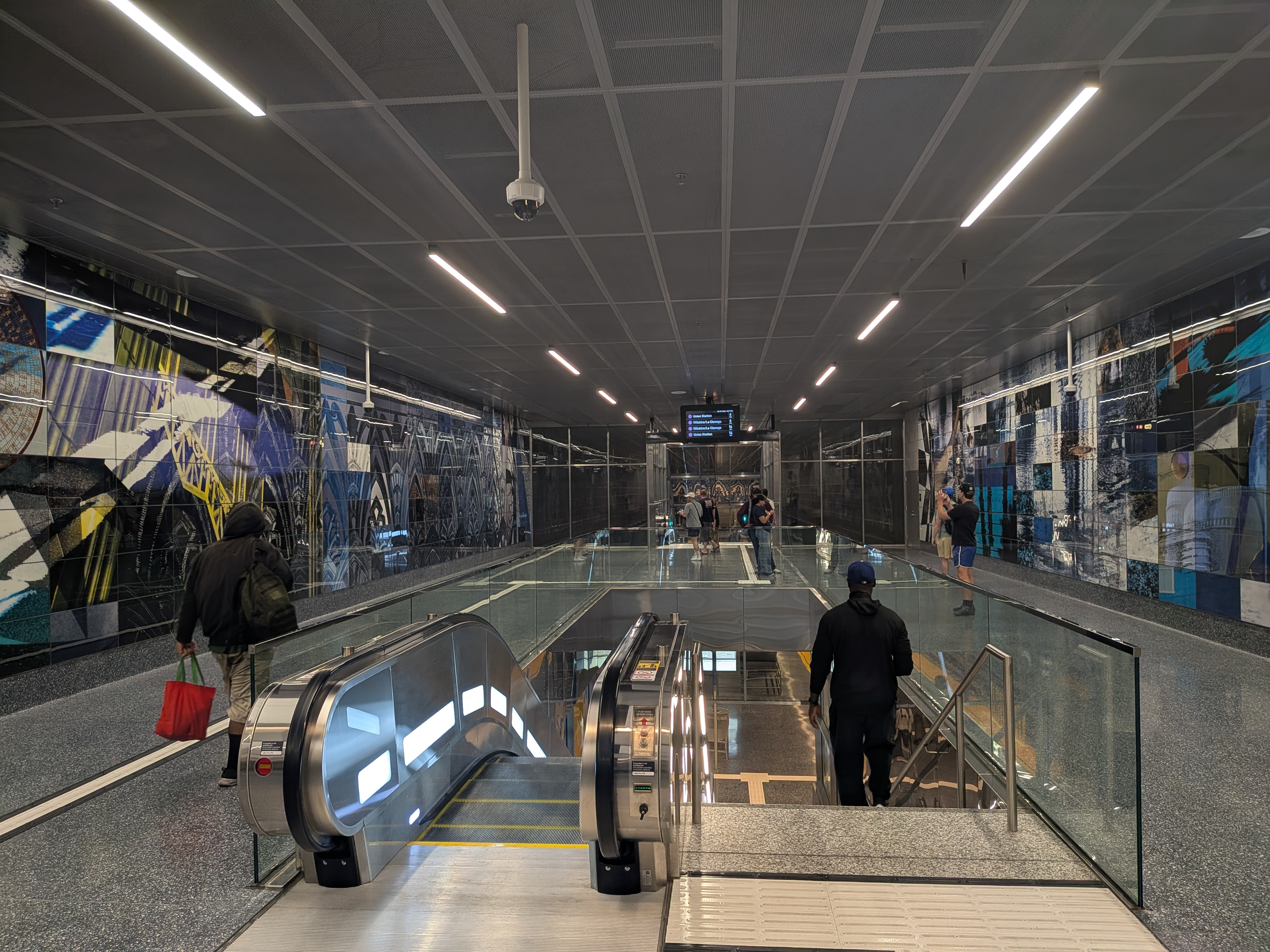
Escalator to station platform from mezzanine

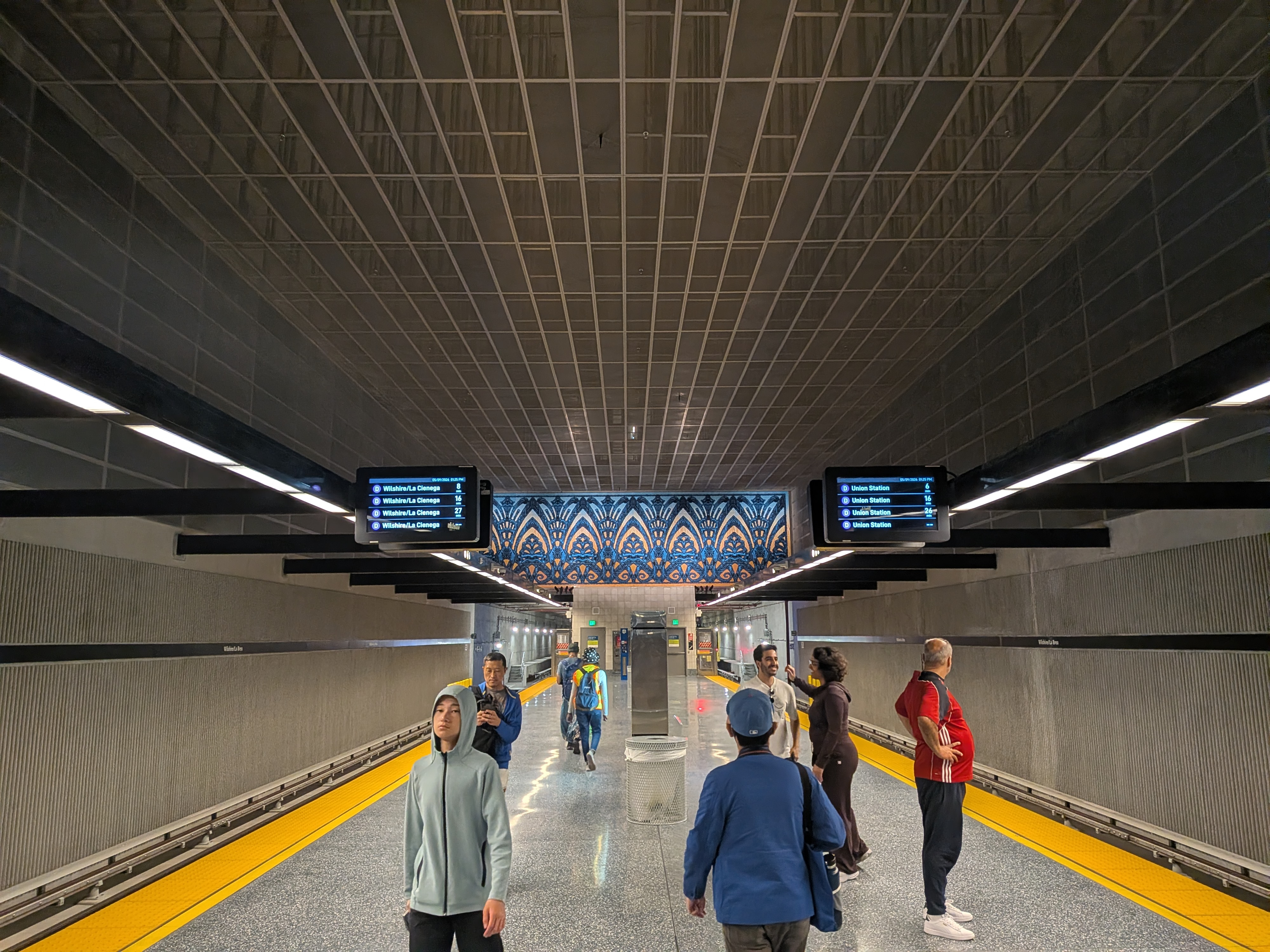
Platform view

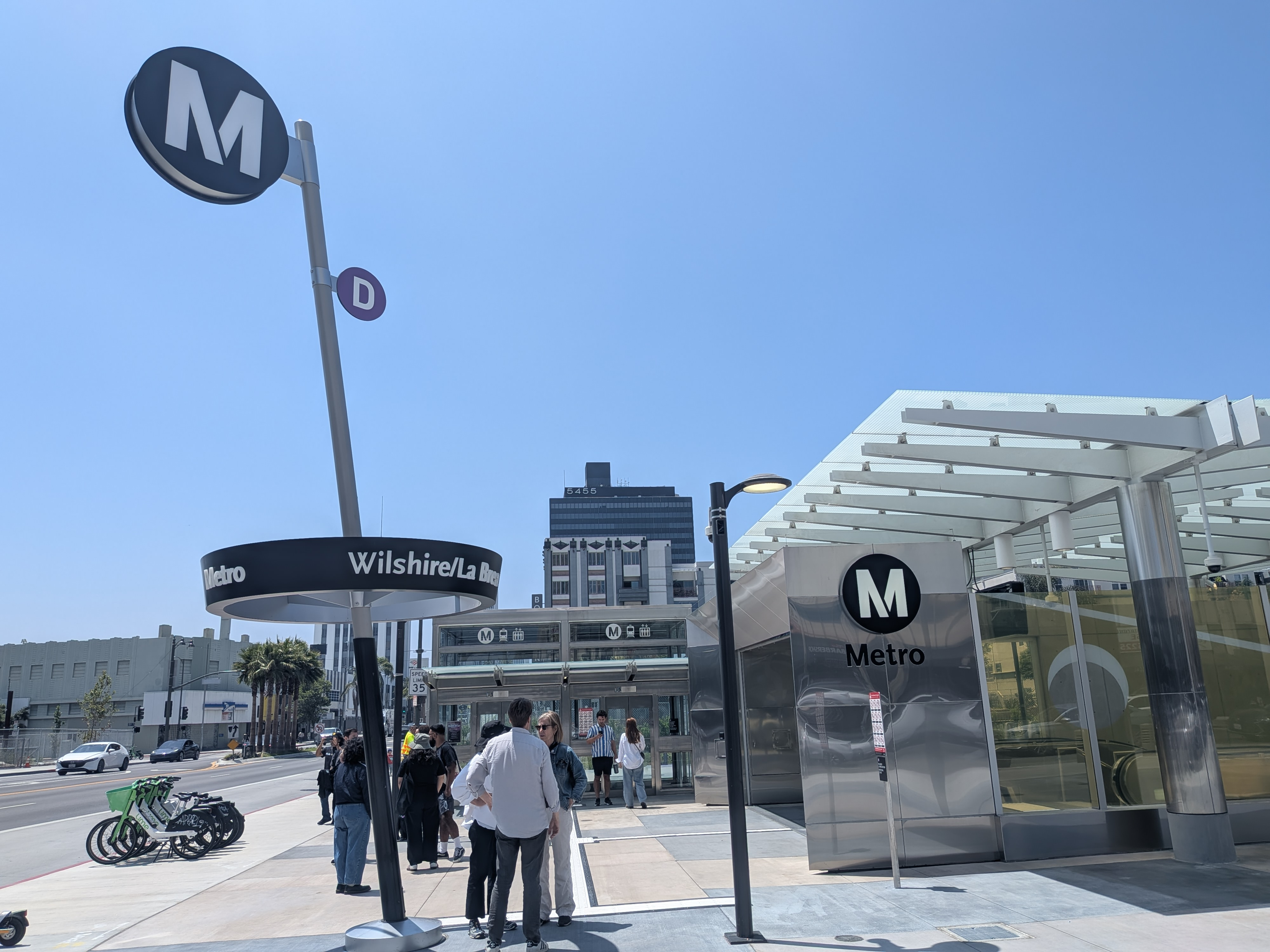
Headhouse station entrance

Station headhouse at night

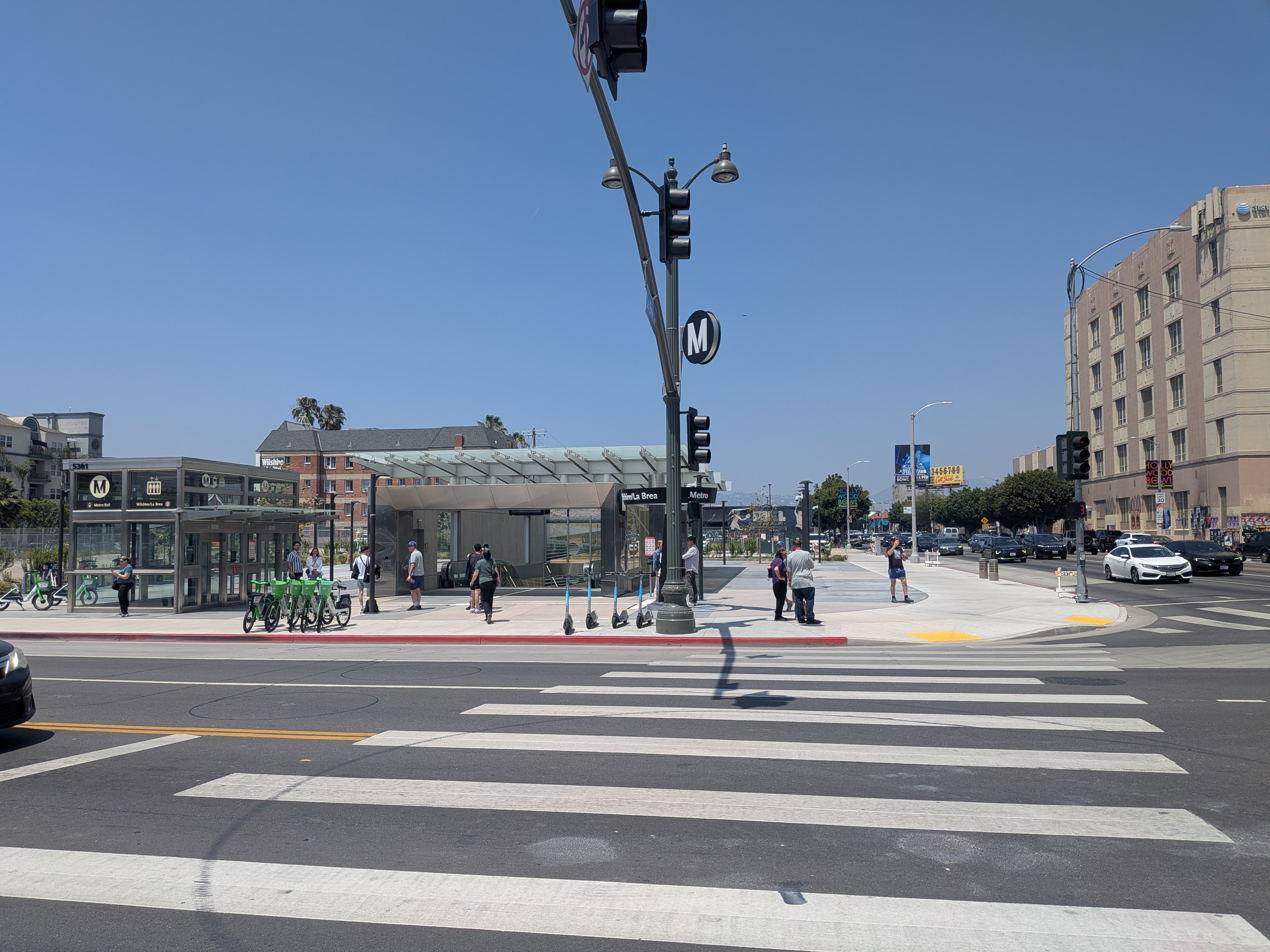
Station headhouse from street level
