= Wilshire/La Cienega station =

Rapid transit station in Beverly Hills, California

Wilshire/La Cienega
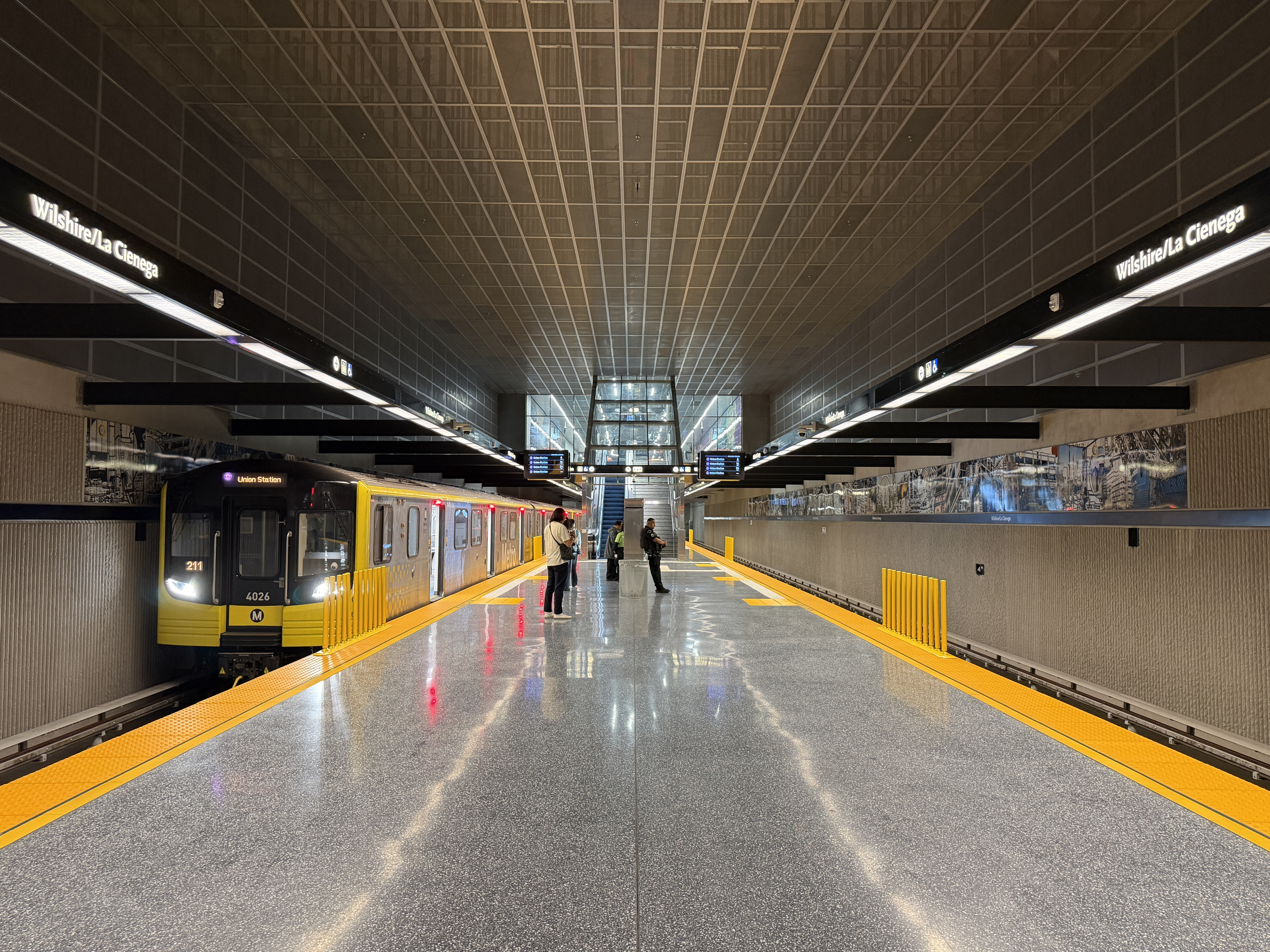
- Wilshire/La Cienega station platform, May 2026

General information
- Location: 8485 Wilshire Boulevard; Beverly Hills, California
- Coordinates: 34°3′55″N 118°22′33″W
- Owner: Los Angeles Metro
- Platforms: 1 island platform
- Tracks: 2
- Connections: Antelope Valley Transit Authority; Los Angeles Metro Bus

Construction
- Accessible: Yes

History
- Opened: May 8, 2026; 6 months ago

Passengers
- FY 2026: 2,117 (avg. wkdy boardings)

Services
Preceding station	Metro Rail	Following station
Terminus	D Line	Wilshire/Fairfax toward Union Station

Future services
Preceding station	Metro Rail	Following station
Beverly Drive toward Century City	D Line Extension Section 2	Wilshire/Fairfax toward Union Station
Location

Wilshire/La Cienega station is an underground rapid transit station on the D Line of the Los Angeles Metro Rail system in the South East neighborhood of Beverly Hills, California, at the intersection of Wilshire Boulevard and La Cienega Boulevard. The tunneling work from the east (Wilshire/La Brea station) was completed in May 2021 and the tunneling work from the west (Beverly Drive station) was completed in January 2023. The station opened on May 8, 2026.

== Service ==
=== Hours and frequency ===
D Line trains run every day between approximately 5 a.m. and midnight. Trains operate every 10 minutes during peak hours. Early morning and night service is approximately every 20 minutes.

=== Connections ===
As of May 8, 2026, the following connections are available:

- Antelope Valley Transit Authority: 786
- Los Angeles Metro Bus: 20, 105, Rapid 720

== Station site and layout ==
Located at the intersection Wilshire Boulevard and La Cienega Boulevard, the new, one-story subway station provides access to the trains below via escalators, elevators, and stairs. The entrance is located on the northeast corner of the intersection. Underground, the station includes an upper level concourse for ticketing, and at the level of the tracks a passenger platform for boarding and egress.

The site of the new station was formerly occupied by a Citibank. It was demolished circa 2016 to provide a temporary staging yard. Another staging yard was at the northwest corner of Wilshire and Gale Drive, where Luther Burbank Savings had been located. These yards supported the multi-year construction project.

== Local attractions ==
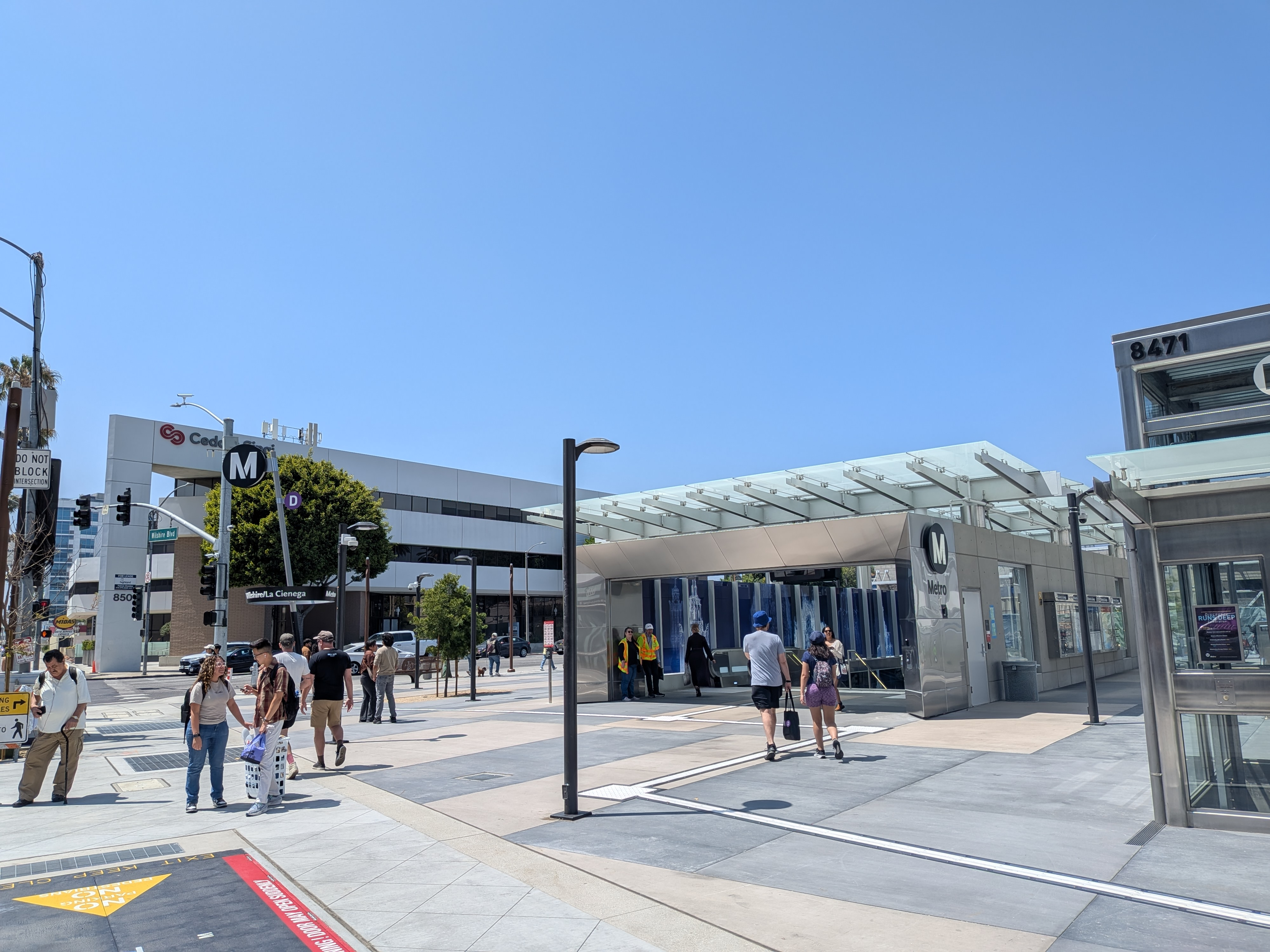
Entrance of the station on Wilshire Boulevard.

Nearby attractions and institutions include:

- Beverly Center
- Consulates of Brazil, Colombia, Costa Rica, and Turkey.
- Cedars-Sinai Medical Center
- La Cienega Park
- Restaurant Row, including Lawry's The Prime Rib
- Saban Theatre
- The Fine Arts Theatre operated by Screening Services Group
- The Margaret Herrick Library of the Academy of Motion Picture Arts and Sciences
- John Wayne equestrian statue near Wilshire Boulevard and Hamilton Drive

== Gallery ==
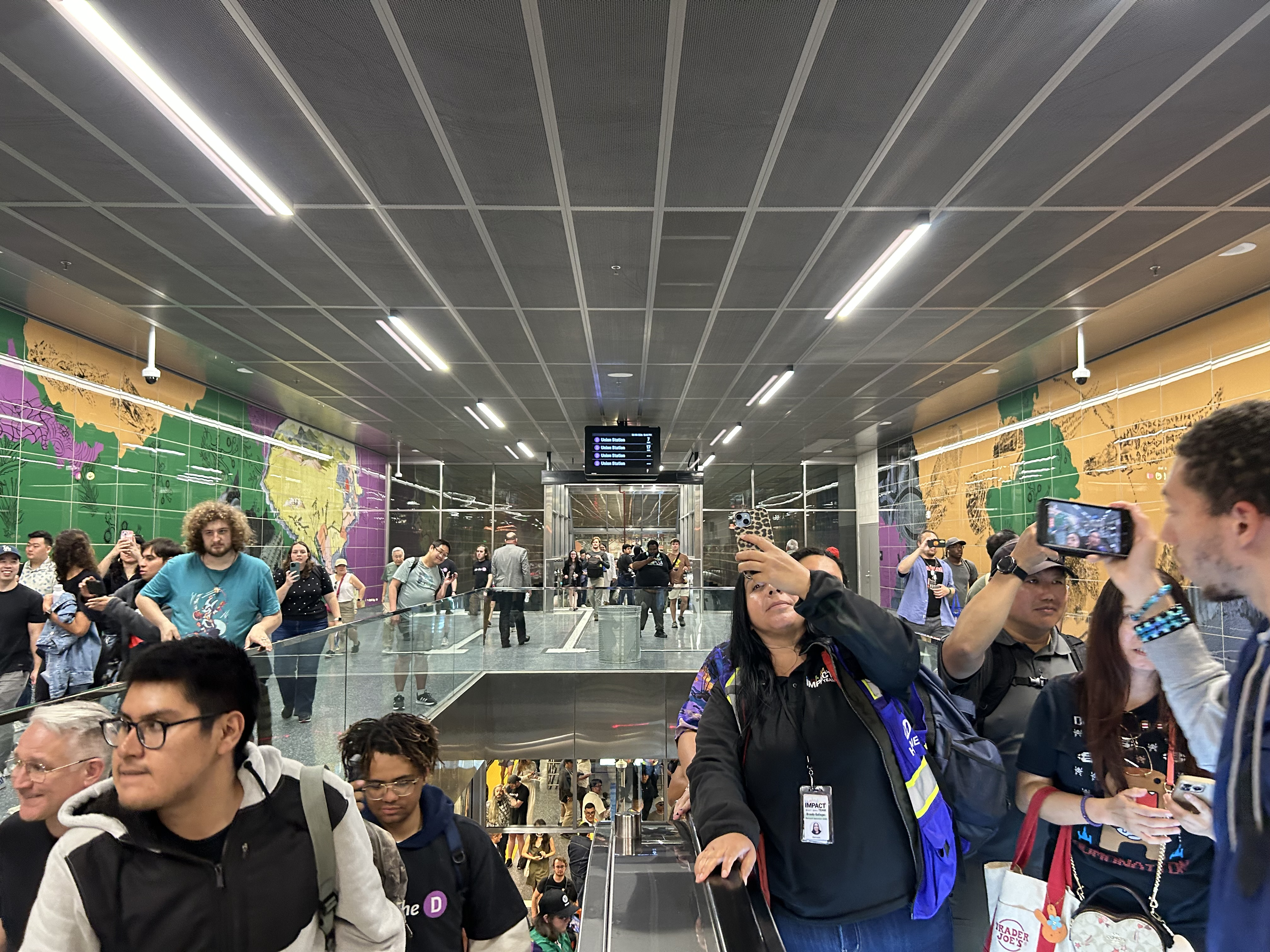
Wilshire/La Cienega station mezzanine on opening day

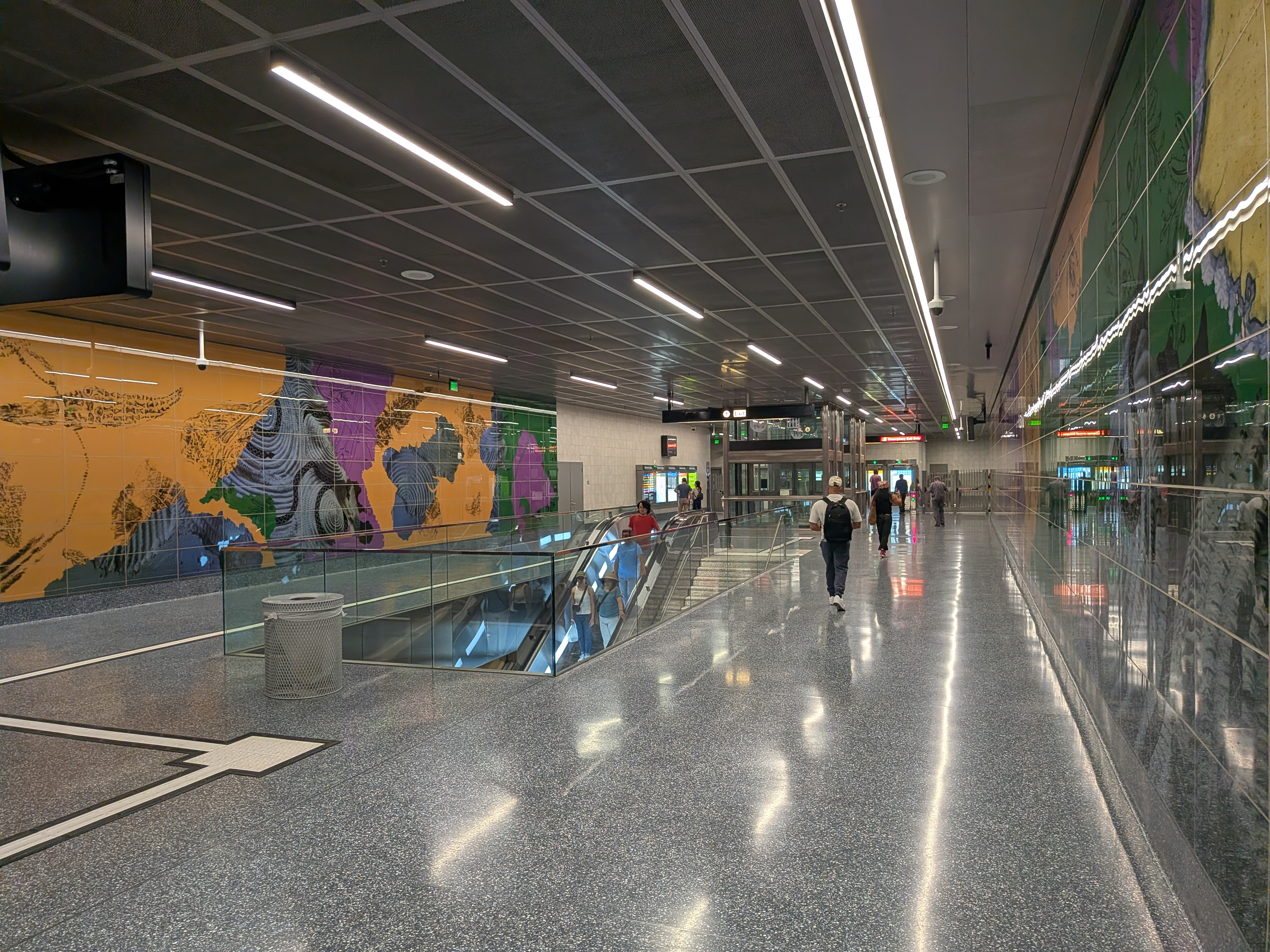
Station mezzanine

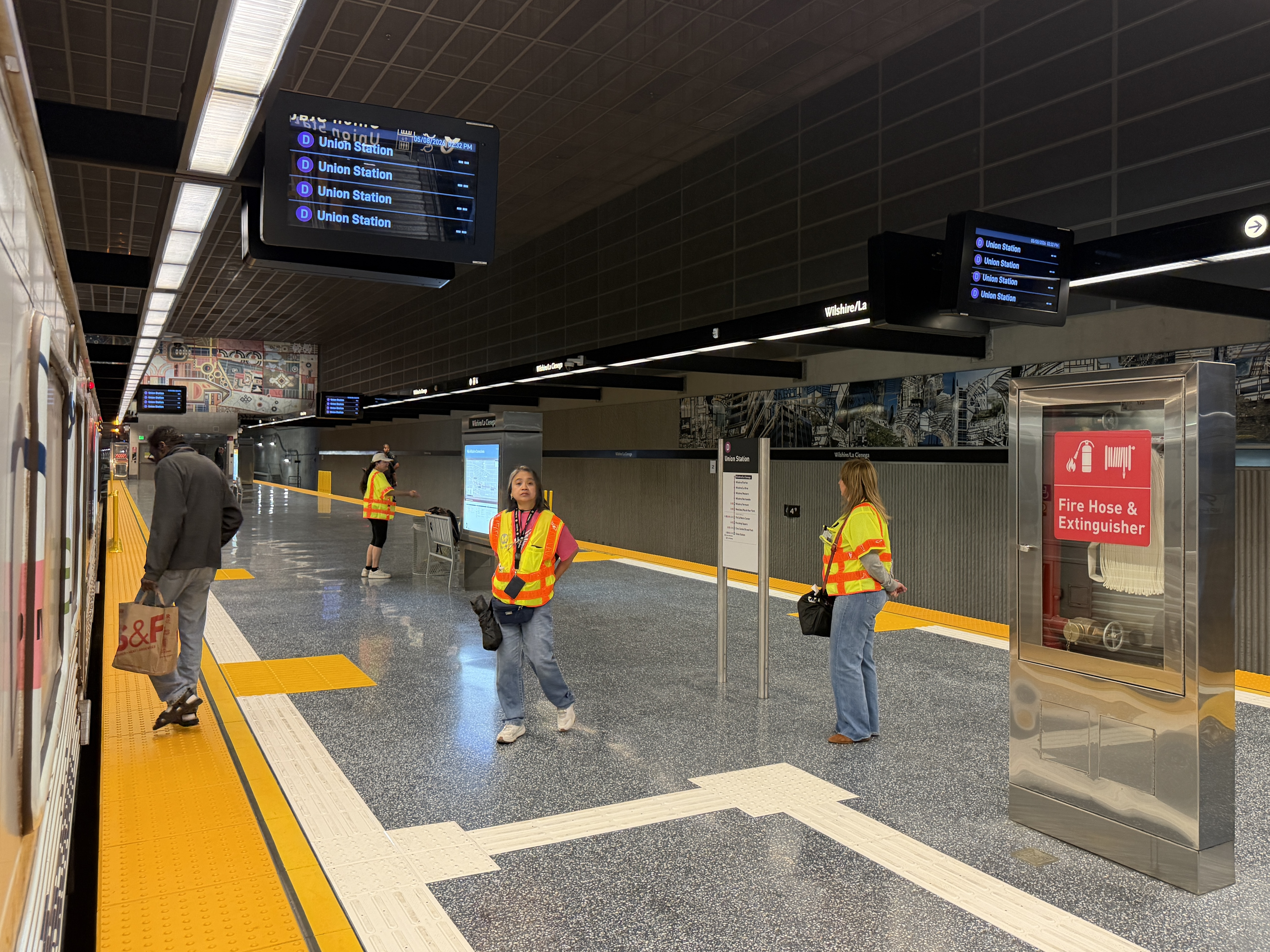
View of station platform from train

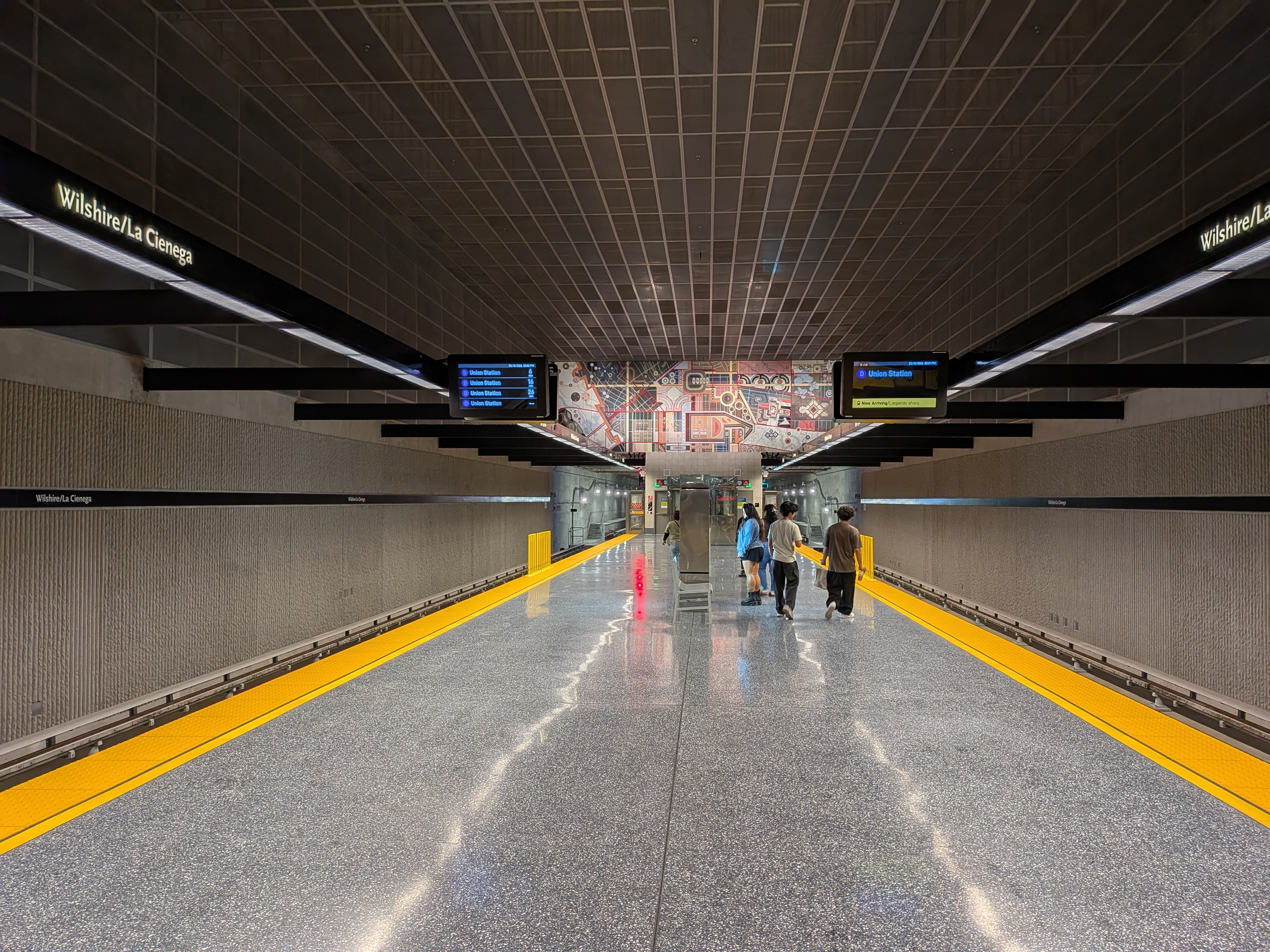
Station platform

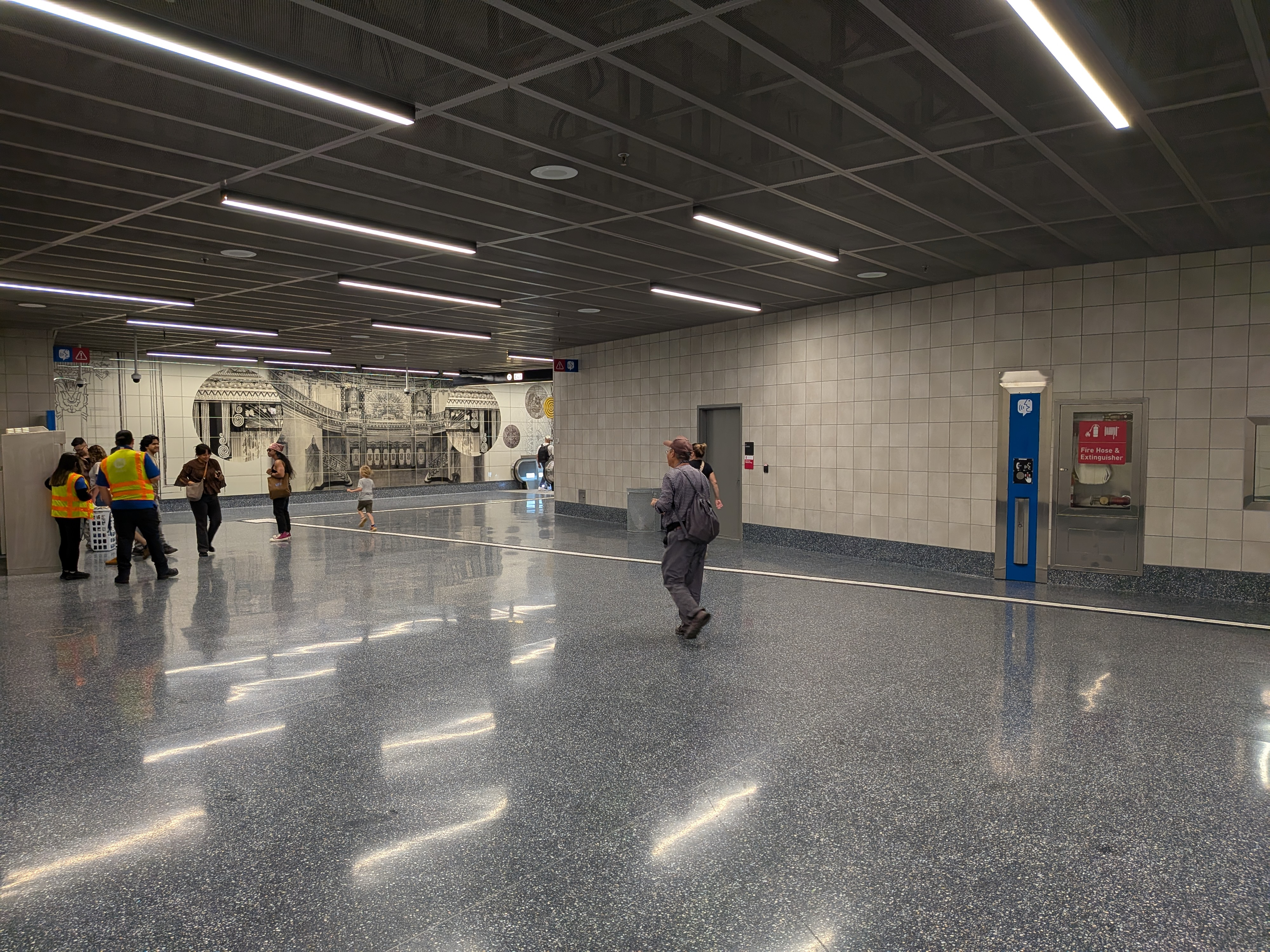
Station concourse

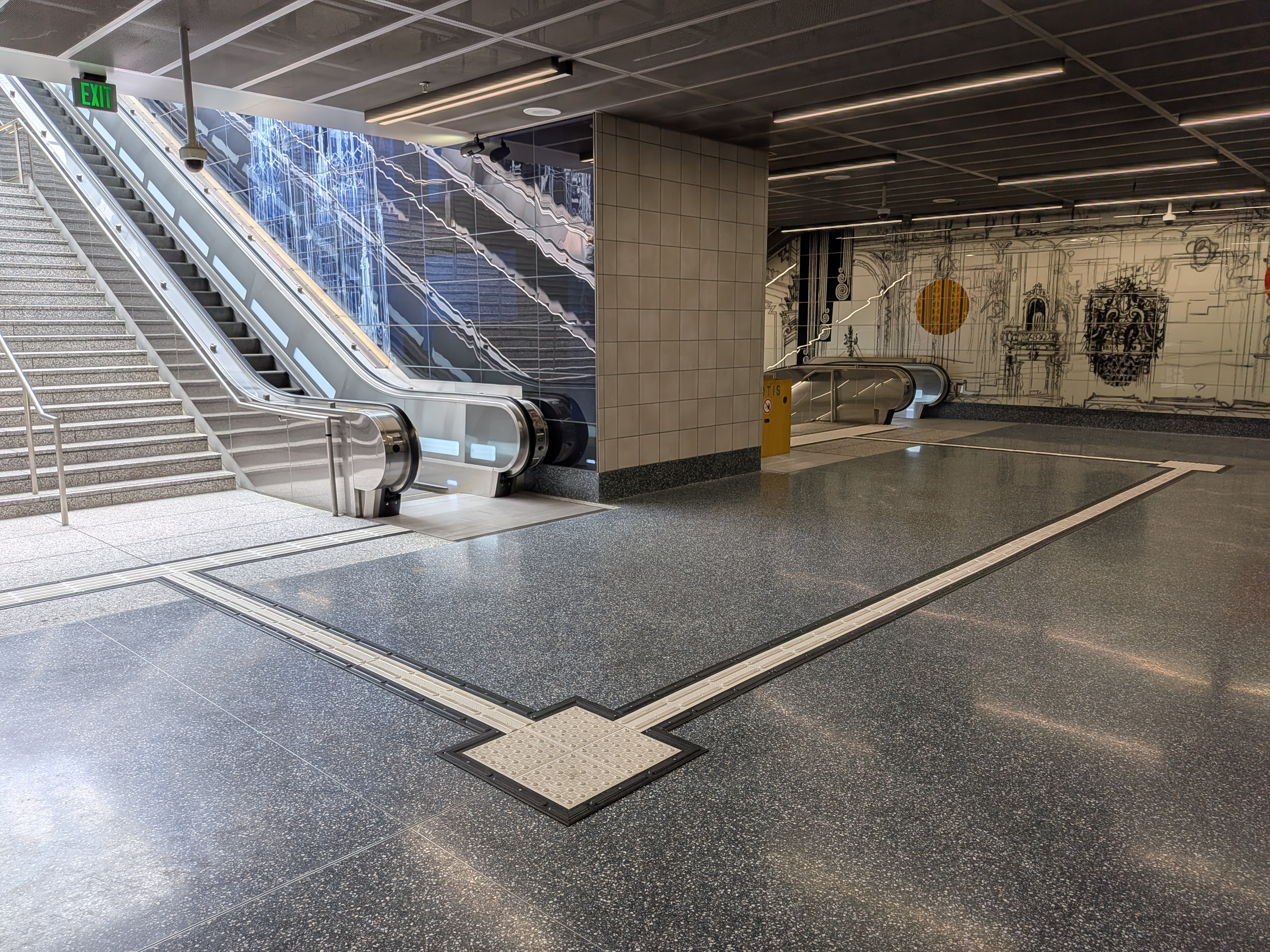
Escalator leading to street level
