= Historic Broadway station =

Light rail station

Historic Broadway
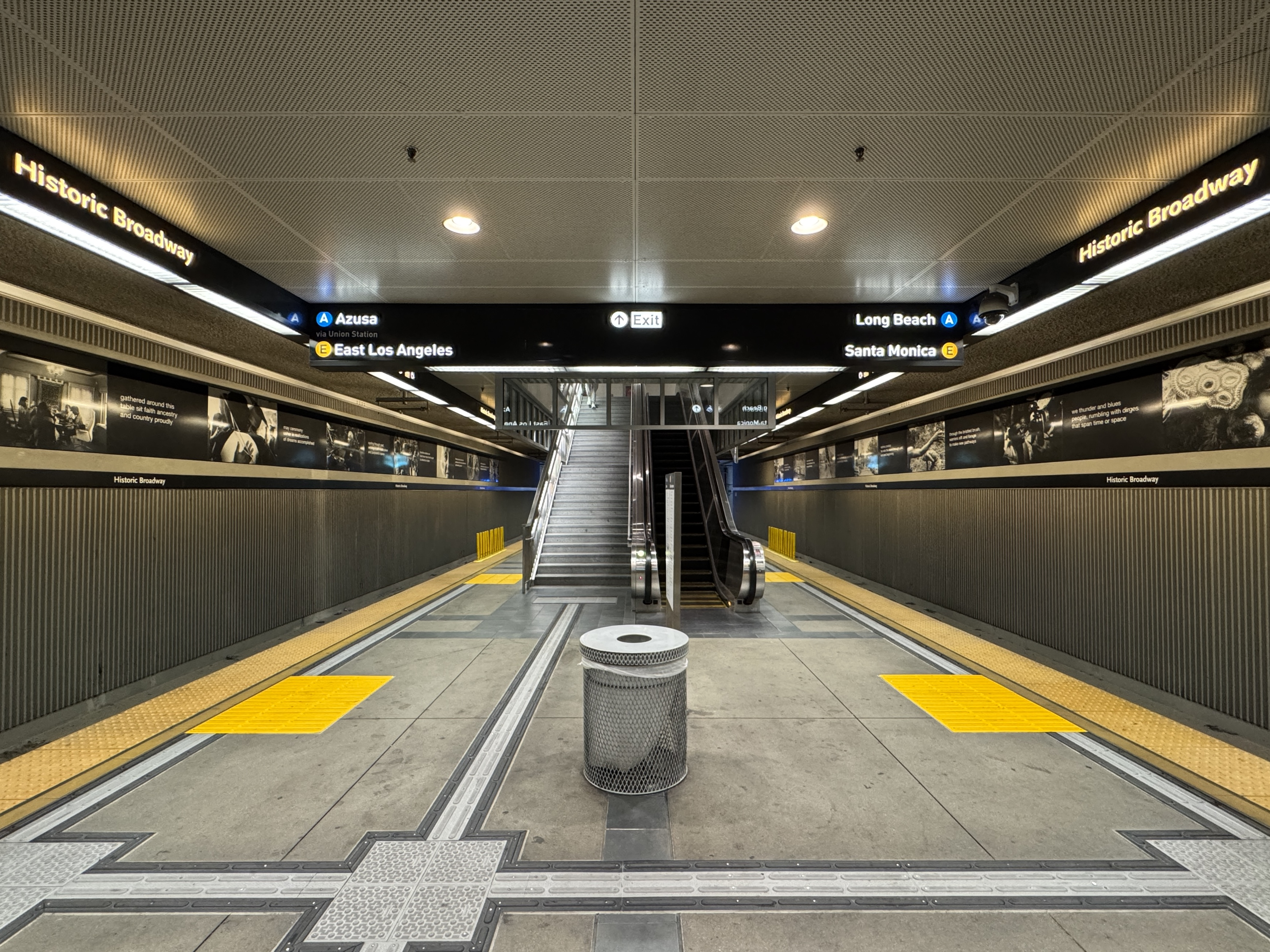
- Historic Broadway station platform

General information
- Location: 202 South Broadway; Los Angeles, California
- Coordinates: 34°3′8″N 118°14′47″W
- Owner: Los Angeles County Metropolitan Transportation Authority
- Platforms: 1 island platform
- Tracks: 2
- Connections: See Connections section

Construction
- Structure type: Underground
- Parking: Paid parking nearby
- Cycle facilities: Metro Bike Share station, racks, lockers
- Accessible: Yes

History
- Opened: June 16, 2023
- Former names: 2nd St/Broadway

Passengers
- FY 2025: 1,687 (avg. wkdy boardings, rail only)

Services
Preceding station	Metro Rail	Following station
Grand Avenue Arts/Bunker Hill toward Long Beach	A Line	Little Tokyo/Arts District toward Pomona
Grand Avenue Arts/Bunker Hill toward Santa Monica	E Line	Little Tokyo/Arts District toward East LA
Preceding station	Foothill Transit	Following station
Civic Center/Grand Park toward Pico	Silver Streak (street service)	Union Station (stops en route) One-way operation
Location

Historic Broadway station is an underground light rail station on the A and E lines of the Los Angeles Metro Rail system. It is located at the southeast corner of 2nd Street and Broadway in the Historic Core section of Downtown Los Angeles. In planning documents, the station was originally going to be named 2nd St/Broadway.

Historic Broadway was built as part of the Regional Connector project, a tunnel through Downtown Los Angeles. The station is sited in privately owned land and required an agreement with the property's owner, which reserved the right to build a high-rise building above the station entrance on the site in the future. It was constructed via the sequential excavation method, the first time Metro has utilized the process.

== Service ==
=== Hours and frequency ===
A Line service hours are from approximately 4:30 a.m. and 11:45 p.m. daily. Trains operate every 8 minutes during peak hours, Monday to Friday. Trains run every 10 minutes, during midday on weekdays and weekends, from 9:00 a.m. to 7:00 p.m. Night and early morning service is approximately every 20 minutes every day.

E Line service hours are from approximately 4:30 a.m. and 11:45 p.m daily. Trains operate every 8 minutes during peak hours, Monday to Friday. Trains run every 10 minutes, during midday on weekdays and weekends, from 9:00 a.m. to 7:00 p.m. Night and early morning service is approximately every 20 minutes every day.

=== Connections ===
As of December 15, 2024, the following connections are available:

- Antelope Valley Transit Authority: 785*
- Big Blue Bus (Santa Monica): Rapid 10*
- City of Santa Clarita Transit: 799*
- Foothill Transit: 493*, 495*, 497*, 498*, 499*, 699*
- LADOT Commuter Express: 409*, 419*, 422*, 423*, 431*, 437*, 438*, 448*, 534*
- LADOT DASH: A, B, D
- Los Angeles Metro Bus: 4, 10, 14, 28, 30, 33, 37, 40, 45, 48, 76, 78, 81, 90, 92, 94, Express 487, Express 489*
- Montebello Bus Lines: 90 Express*
- Torrance Transit: 4X*

Note: * indicates commuter service that operates only during weekday rush hours.

== Notable places nearby ==
The station is within walking distance of the following notable places:

- Ace Hotel Los Angeles
- Angels Flight
- Biddy Mason Park
- Bradbury Building
- Broadway Theater District
- Caltrans District 7 Headquarters
- Cathedral of Our Lady of the Angels
- Cathedral of Saint Vibiana
- Clara Shortridge Foltz Criminal Justice Center
- Continental Building
- Grand Central Market
- Grand Park
- Hellman Building
- Higgins Building
- Hotel Alexandria
- Hotel Rosslyn Annex
- Los Angeles City Hall
- Los Angeles Department of Transportation Headquarters
- Los Angeles Police Department Headquarters
- Los Angeles Stock Exchange Building
- Los Angeles Theatre
- Los Angeles Theatre Center
- Mayan Theater
- Metropolitan Building
- Million Dollar Theater
- Orpheum Theatre
- Pacific Electric Building
- San Fernando Building
- State Theatre
- Stanley Mosk Courthouse
- Times Mirror Square
- Tower Theatre

== Station artwork ==
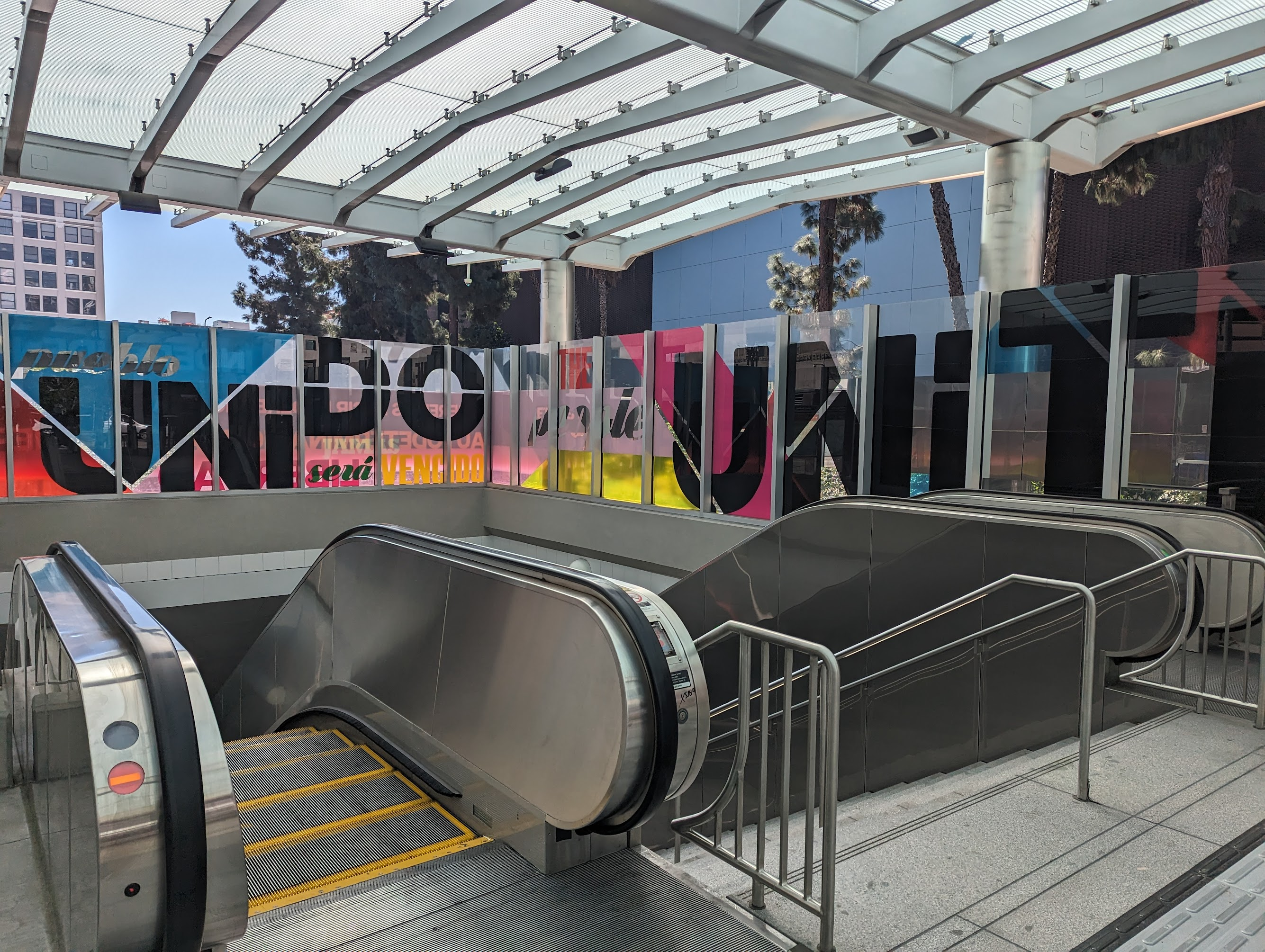
Entrance to the station, with Bowers' The People United on display

Historic Broadway station is home to four Metro Art-commissioned artworks.

The station's glass entry pavilion is wrapped in Andrea Bowers' The People United (“El pueblo unido jamás será vencido,” Sergio Ortega and Quilapayun; “Brown Beret 13 Point Political Program,” La Causa) which features text artwork of revolutionary slogans such as “El pueblo unido jamás será vencido” (the people united will never be divided) and “By independence we mean the right to self-determination, self-government and freedom.”

According to Metro Art, "the first text is often heard chanted at marches and political demonstrations around the world". It originated in Chile between 1969 and 1973 in support of Salvador Allende’s presidential election and evolved into an anthem composed by Sergio Ortega for the Chilean Popular Unity coalition. The second is taken from a mission statement of the Brown Berets, a Chicano civil rights group founded in East Los Angeles and active during the late 1960s and early 1970s."

On the mezzanine level of the station, you can find Mark Steven Greenfield's glass mosaic named Red Car Requiem, a "sentimental tribute" to the Los Angeles Pacific Electric Red Cars. The artwork represents different destinations along a route, rendered in red, orange, and yellow hues of the Red Cars. It features a series of rosette-like clusters of curvilinear shapes that are connected by sweeping lines. Each rosette contains unique shapes that were once punched into Red Car passenger tickets.

Along the walls of the station platform is a mural by photojournalist Clarence Williams, entitled Migrations, and a temporary lightbox art installation by Ralph Gilbert, Performance on the Streets of LA.
