= Pershing Square station =

Rapid transit station in Los Angeles, California

Pershing Square
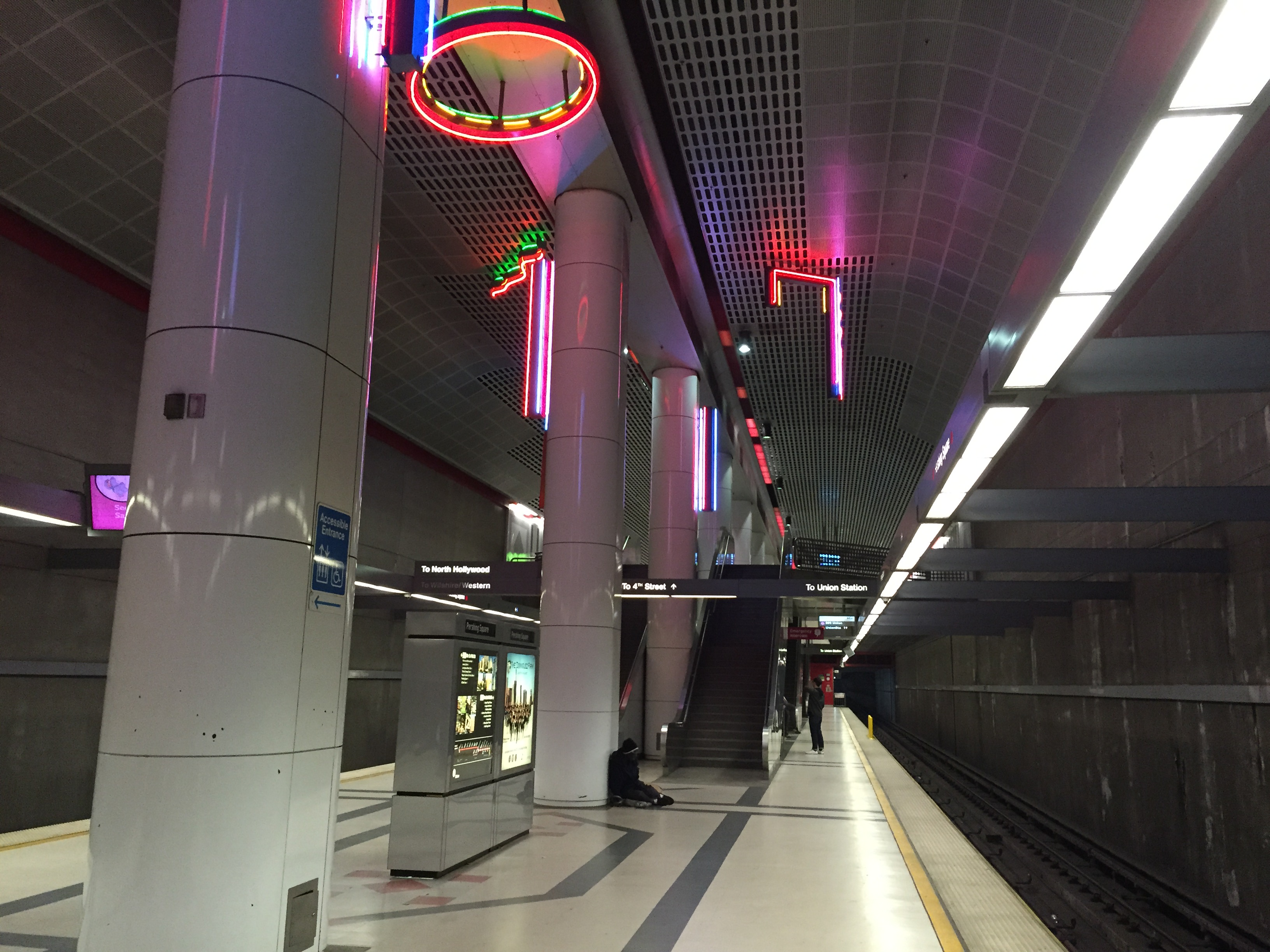
- Pershing Square station platform in 2016

General information
- Location: 500 South Hill Street; Los Angeles, California
- Coordinates: 34.0543°N 118.2467°W
- Owner: Los Angeles Metro
- Platforms: 1 island platform
- Tracks: 2
- Connections: See connections section

Construction
- Structure type: Underground
- Parking: Paid parking nearby
- Cycle facilities: Metro Bike Share station, racks and lockers

History
- Opened: January 30, 1993; 33 years ago

Passengers
- FY 2026: 4,469 (avg. wkdy boardings, rail only)

Services
Preceding station	Metro Rail	Following station
7th Street/Metro Center toward North Hollywood	B Line	Civic Center/Grand Park toward Union Station
7th Street/Metro Center toward Wilshire/La Cienega	D Line	Civic Center/Grand Park toward Union Station
Preceding station	Metro Busway	Following station
7th Street/Metro Center (stops en route) toward Harbor Gateway or San Pedro	J Line (street service)	Grand Avenue Arts/Bunker Hill toward El Monte
Preceding station	Foothill Transit	Following station
7th Street/Metro Center toward Pico	Silver Streak (street service)	Grand Avenue Arts/Bunker Hill One-way operation
7th Street/Metro Center toward Pico	Silver Streak (street service)	Civic Center/Grand Park toward Montclair
Location

Pershing Square station is an underground rapid transit station on the B Line and D Line of the Los Angeles Metro Rail system. The station also has street-level stops for the J Line of the Los Angeles Metro Busway system and the Silver Streak, operated by Foothill Transit. The station is located under Hill Street between 4th and 5th Street. It is located in Downtown Los Angeles with one station entrance across the street from Pershing Square, after which the station is named, and the other is located near the historic Angels Flight funicular which provides access to the high-rise office buildings in the Bunker Hill neighborhood.

On October 22, 2026, the Los Angeles Metro board of directors unanimously approved a motion to rename the station Biddy Mason station, following the unanimous approval of a motion by the Los Angeles City Council on September 4, 2026 to rename Pershing Square "Biddy Mason Park".

== Service ==
=== Hours and frequency ===
B Line trains run every day between approximately 4:30 a.m. and midnight. D Line trains run every day between approximately 5 a.m. and midnight. Towards North Hollywood or Wilshire/La Cienega, trains operate every 10 minutes throughout the day. Early morning and night service is approximately every 20 minutes. Towards Union Station, trains run every five minutes throughout the day. Early morning and night service is approximately every 10 minutes.

J Line buses run 24 hours a day between El Monte, Downtown Los Angeles, and the Harbor Gateway Transit Center, as route 910. Some trips continue to San Pedro between 6 a.m. and 8 p.m. and are signed as Route 950. On weekdays, buses operate every four to eight minutes during peak hours. They operate every 10 minutes in the midday, 20 minutes during evenings, 40 minutes during nights, and every hour overnight. On weekends, buses arrive every 15 minutes most of the day. They operate every 20 minutes during evenings, 40 minutes during nights, and every hour overnight.

=== Connections ===
In addition to the rail and busway services, Pershing Square station is a major hub for municipal bus lines. As of September 10, 2023, the following connections are available:

- City of Commerce Transit: 600
- LADOT Commuter Express: 419*
- LADOT DASH: B, D
- Los Angeles Metro Bus: 4, 10, 14, 16, 18, 28, 30, 33, 37, 38, 40, 45, 48, 53, 55, 62, 76, 78, 81, 92, 94, Express 460, Express 487, Express 489*, Rapid 720
- Montebello Bus Lines: 40, 50, 90 Express
- Torrance Transit: 4X*

Note: * indicates commuter service that operates only during weekday rush hours.

== Notable places nearby ==
The station is within walking distance of the following notable places:

- 1 Cal Plaza
- 2Cal
- Angels Landing – Two high-rise buildings planned on the site above the station
- Consulate General of Japan
- Grand Central Market
- Historic Core/Broadway
- Jewelry District
- Los Angeles Theatre Center (LATC)
- Millennium Biltmore Hotel
- Pershing Square
- Richard J. Riordan Central Library
- Title Guarantee and Trust Company Building
- U.S. Bank Tower

== Station artwork ==
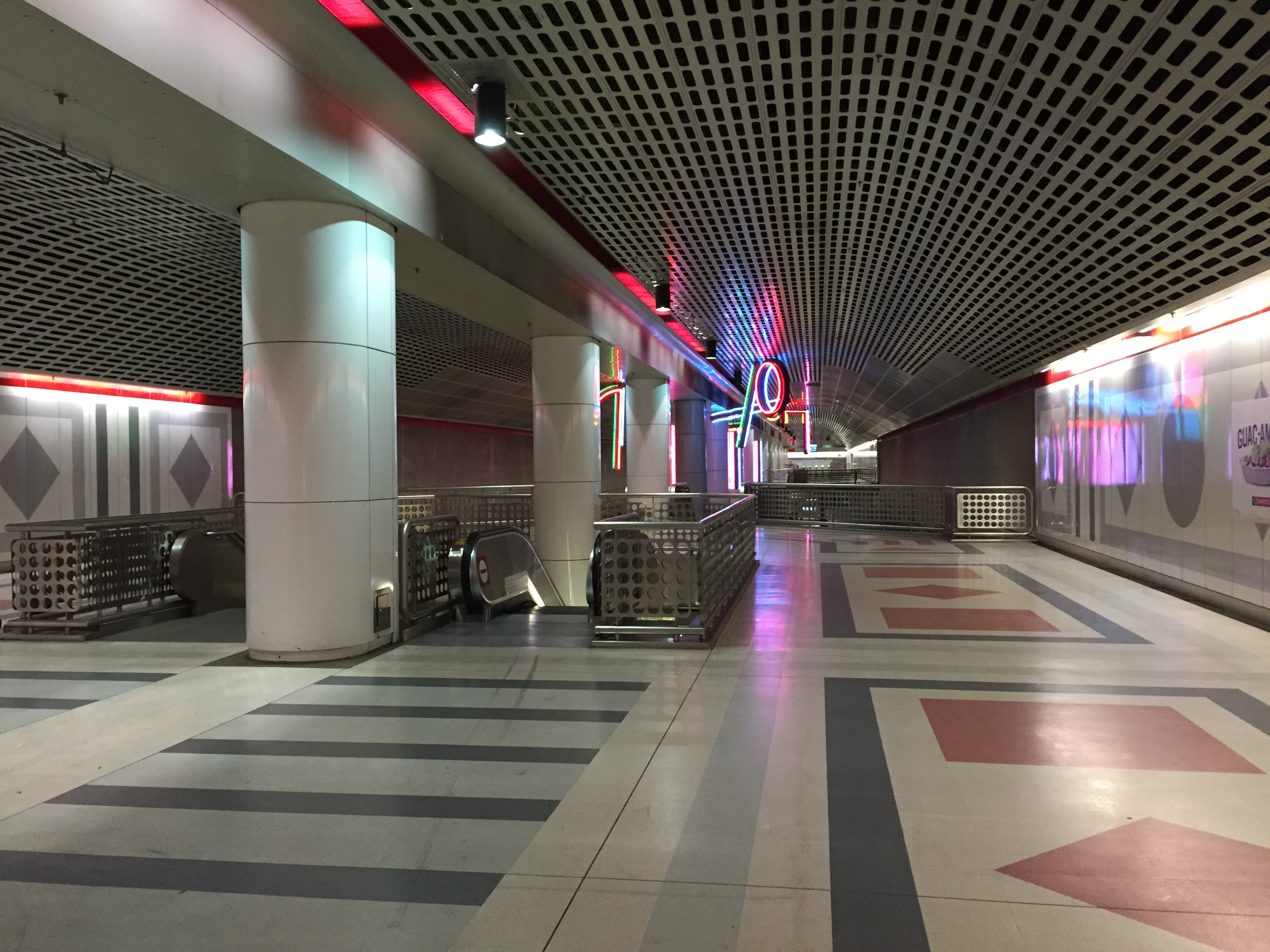
Mezzanine level

The station is decorated with a neon art piece by Stephen Antonakos. The work pays tribute to the first neon sign in the United States, which was hung in 1924 in the Pershing Square area.
