= Regional Connector =

Transit project in Los Angeles

Regional Connector Transit Project
- Map of the route of the Regional Connector

Overview
- Status: Open
- Owner: Los Angeles Metro
- Locale: Downtown Los Angeles
- Termini: Little Tokyo/Arts District; 7th Street/Metro Center
- Stations: 3
- Website: metro.net/connector

Service
- Type: Light rail
- System: Los Angeles Metro Rail
- Services: A Line E Line

History
- Opened: June 16, 2023; 3 years ago

Technical
- Line length: 1.9 mi (3.1 km)
- Character: Fully underground
- Track gauge: 4 ft 8 1/2 in (1,435 mm) standard gauge
- Electrification: Overhead line, 750 V DC
Route map
A Line tunnel highlighted in blue, E Line tunnel in gold, shared tunnel in black

The Regional Connector Transit Project constructed a 1.9-mile (3.1 km) light rail tunnel for the Los Angeles Metro Rail system in Downtown Los Angeles. It connected the A and E lines with the former L Line. The A and E lines previously both terminated at 7th Street/Metro Center station, coming from Long Beach and Santa Monica, respectively, while the L Line ran through Little Tokyo/Arts District to either Azusa or East Los Angeles. Now the A and E lines continue together through new stations at Grand Avenue Arts/Bunker Hill, Historic Broadway, and Little Tokyo/Arts District. From there, they diverge on the former L Line toward Azusa and East Los Angeles, respectively. The project provides a one-seat ride into the core of Downtown for passengers on those lines who previously needed to transfer, thus reducing or altogether eliminating many transfers of passengers traveling across the region via Downtown Los Angeles.

The project was implemented by Los Angeles Metro. It was given high priority by Metro in its long-range plan and had funding set aside for it in Measure R.

The draft environmental impact statement was completed in September 2010, selection of a preferred alternative was completed in late October 2010, and the Final Environmental Impact Report was certified on April 26, 2012. Pre-construction on the project began in December 2012. The contract for heavy construction on the project was signed on July 9, 2014, and its official groundbreaking was held on September 30, 2014. Originally scheduled to open in 2020, but delayed due to construction and train testing difficulties, the project opened on June 16, 2023.

== Route ==
The project's tunnels begin at the north end of 7th Street/Metro Center station, the previous terminal built in the early 1990s, and continue north under Flower Street. The line turns to run under 2nd Street and dives below the 2nd Street Tunnel and the B/D subway with clearances as low as 7 feet (2.1 m). In Little Tokyo, the line turns off 2nd to serve the replacement underground Little Tokyo/Arts District station before the routes split to their own surface portals, connecting to former L Line tracks.

=== Station listing ===
The Regional Connector includes three stations. From northeast to southwest, the stations are:

- Little Tokyo/Arts District, located at 1st Street and Central Avenue, which replaces the former above-ground station of the same name
- Historic Broadway, located at 2nd Street and Broadway
- Grand Avenue Arts/Bunker Hill, located at 2nd Place and Hope Street

At previous points during planning and construction, Little Tokyo/Arts District was referred to as 1st St/Central; Historic Broadway as Los Angeles City Hall or 2nd Street/Broadway; and Grand Avenue Arts/Bunker Hill as Bunker Hill or 2nd Place/Hope Street.

== Restructuring of service ==
Metro discontinued the L Line and used parts of its route to reconfigure the A and E Lines into the following:

Line	Route	Color
A Line (Blue)	The previously existing part of the A Line would continue service under its name.: The northern half of the former L Line (Union Station to Pomona) became part of the A Line via the new tunnel.	Retained Blue Color.
E Line (Expo)	The previously existing part of the E Line will continue service under its name.: The Eastside half of the former L Line (Pico/Aliso to Atlantic) became part of the E Line via the new tunnel.	Changed to Gold Color.
L Line (Gold)	Ceased service after the completion of the project.: The A Line took over its northern half, and the E Line took over its Eastside half.	Color handed to E Line.

Due to the restructuring of service, the A Line became the longest light rail line in the world at 49.5 miles (79.7 km), surpassing the 42 miles (68 km) Coast Tram in Belgium. It became even longer upon completion of Phase 2B of the Foothill Extension when it opened in 2025.

A Line length after completion
Segment	Length (mi)	Length (km)
Previously existing A Line	21.0	33.8
Regional Connector	1.9	3.1
Little Tokyo/Arts District station to Union Station	0.6	1.0
Original Gold Line (from Union Station to Sierra Madre Villa station)	13.7	22.0
Gold Line Foothill Extension Phase 2A	11.3	18.2
Total	48.5	78.1

E Line length after completion
Segment	Length (mi)	Length (km)
Previously existing E Line (Phases I and II)	14.7	23.7
Regional Connector	1.9	3.1
Gold Line Eastside Extension (from Little Tokyo/Arts District station to Atlantic station)	5.4	8.7
Total	22	35

== Background ==
The connector was envisioned as early as 1984 when planning and building the Metro Blue Line and restudied with a through connection in the Pasadena Light Rail Corridor studies in 1989. LACMTA originally envisioned the Blue Line running through Downtown L.A. to Union Station and onward to Pasadena with potential future lines to the northwest (Burbank/Glendale) and to the south and west (Exposition Park/Santa Monica). The connector was not completed due to lack of funds and realignment of the Red Line Eastside Extension, which later became an extension of the Pasadena Gold Line (the Gold Line was renamed the L line in 2019).

The connector was formally studied for the first time as a stand-alone project in a Major Investment Study in 1992–1993, in preparation of the Long Range Transportation Plan. The project was revived in 2004, when LACMTA staff initiated a technical feasibility assessment for a potential regional connector. This study focused on conceptual methods to provide a regional connector and to alleviate potential operational constraints.

The 2004 staff study looked at the potential alignments that would not be entirely underground, due to funding constraints from the voter-approved 1998 Prop A ban on local county subway funding. Most of the alignments were under Flower Street, surfacing between 5th Street and 1st Street and proceeding east to Alameda Street, connecting to the Eastside light rail corridor (now part of the Metro L Line), and continuing either north toward Union Station and Azusa or east toward East Los Angeles.

LACMTA staff analyzed at-grade street-running couplets, transit mall, elevated and hybrid subway/at-grade/elevated alignments along east-west streets such as Temple Street, First Street, Second Street and Third Street and utilizing available grade-separated infrastructure such as the Second Street Tunnel through Bunker Hill (between Hill and Figueroa Streets) or the Third Street Tunnel (between Hill and Flower Streets) to minimize costs, improve operating times and improve the feasibility of constructing the project.

In July 2006, the LACMTA Board voted to approve funding and staff to initiate a Major Investment Study (MIS) for the Regional Connector in conjunction with approval of a similar study for the extension of the Red Line subway. In June 2007, the LACMTA Board approved the consultants to perform the Alternative Analysis and MIS, and in July 2007 the Alternatives Analysis was initiated. In November 2007, preliminary outreach meetings for the Alternative Analysis were held at Central Library and the Japanese American National Museum (JANM). The results from these meetings were presented to the public in February 2008, including the descriptions of the eight route alternatives identified for analysis, narrowed down to two later in 2008. At the January 2009 Metro Board Meeting, the Regional Connector was approved and received funding to continue in the environmental study process (Draft EIS/EIR).

== Environmental review process ==
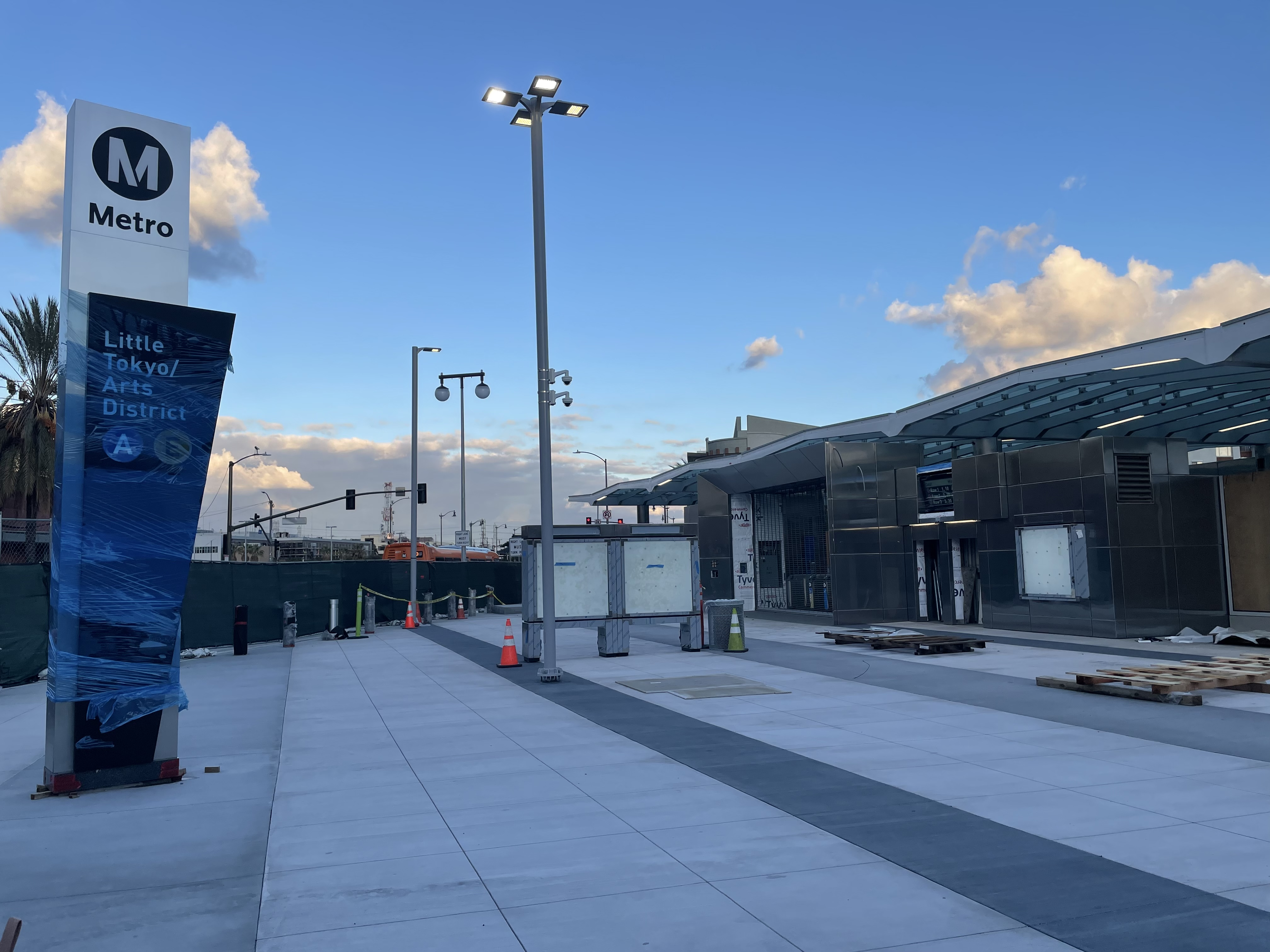
Little Tokyo/Arts District station under construction in February 2023

The Alternatives Analysis yielded two LRT (light rail) build alternatives, plus the required "No Build" and "TSM" (Transportation System Management) options. A third LRT build alternative was added in February 2010, at the request of Little Tokyo stakeholders (including property, business, and homeowners).

The operational intent of the project was to allow through running of service between the four corridors (Blue Line corridor, Expo corridor, Gold Pasadena corridor, and Gold Eastside corridor). All three build alternatives began at 7th St/Metro Center station, which was previously the northern terminus of the Blue Line and the eastern terminus of the Expo Line, which opened on April 28, 2012. All three build alternatives connected to the preexisting Gold Line at Alameda Street near Temple Street or 1st Street.

On October 28, 2010, the LACMTA Board of Directors opted for a fully underground option, rejecting at-grade and underground emphasis alternatives. This route remains underground below Flower and 2nd Streets until northwest of 1st/Alameda. By that point, the route would have split into two branches. Each branch would then emerge from a tunnel – one heading north to Union Station, the other east to the Eastside.

Metro added this alignment in February 2010, after receiving public input on the other two options. This option puts the connector underground beneath 1st/Alameda. The fourth new station (at 1st/Alameda southwest block) would replace the existing Little Tokyo/Arts District station. The third station (nearest the Civic Center) was shifted slightly west toward Broadway, to take advantage of redevelopment efforts in the historic core. This option is generally fastest and has fewest impacts during operations, but it would have more construction impacts and higher costs.

=== Comparison of alternatives ===
The following table summarizes key characteristics of each alternative:

		LRT 1	LRT 2	LRT 3
Alternative Name		At-Grade Emphasis	Underground Emphasis	Fully Underground
Cost (2009 dollars)		$899 million	$1.120 billion	$1.245 billion
New daily systemwide trips		12,300	14,900	17,400
Cost effectiveness (Note: FTA cost-effectiveness index (CEI) vs. the TSM alternative.)		$20.44 (medium)	$17.22 (medium)	$16.77 (medium-high)
Travel time	Union Station to Pico	14 minutes	12 minutes	10 minutes
Travel time	Pico/Aliso to Pico	15 minutes	10 minutes	11 minutes
Station locations	Financial District	S of Flower/5th (below-grade)	N of Flower/5th (below-grade)	N of Flower/5th (below-grade)
Station locations	Bunker Hill	SW of 2nd/Hope (below-grade)	SW of 2nd/Hope (below-grade)	SW of 2nd/Hope (below-grade)
Station locations	Broadway	N of 1st/Main (SB)(at-grade) and N of 1st/Los Angeles (NB)(at-grade)	E of 2nd/Broadway (below-grade) or E of 2nd/Main (below-grade)	E of 2nd/Broadway (below-grade)
Station locations	Little Tokyo	previously existed (at-grade)	previously existed (at-grade)	NE of 2nd/Central (below-grade)

=== Selected Alternative: LRT 3 ===
In September 2010, Metro published the Draft Environmental Impact Statement/Environmental Impact Report (Draft EIS/EIR). The report recommended adoption of the "Fully Underground LRT Alternative" (LRT 3 above).

In October 2010, Metro staff reaffirmed this recommendation, but with the 5th/Flower station removed. The report cited concerns for the overall project cost and the proposed station's short distance from Metro Center/7th Street Station, a mere three blocks, which might not have met FTA funding standards. However, proponents of a 5th/Flower station cited the high density of very large high-rise office buildings within one block of a 5th/Flower station and that such a station would relieve what is expected to be extreme pressure at Metro Center/7th Street (already experiencing pressure) once the E Line, then the Regional Connector are complete.

At the Metro Board meeting in late October 2010, the Board certified the Draft EIS/EIR and accepted the staff recommendation of Fully Underground Alternative with the 5th/Flower station deleted as the Locally Preferred Alternative (LPA). The project staff will now conduct a final study of the LPA, which will culminate in a Final Environmental Impact Study/Environmental Impact Report (Final EIS/EIR).

== Project funding ==
Measure R guaranteed the Regional Connector $160 million for implementation. In February 2014, the federal government granted Metro $670 million in New Starts funds and $160 million in infrastructure loans for the project.

== Construction ==
Pre-construction activities began in December 2012, with the start of the relocation of utility pipes. Major heavy construction was scheduled to begin in 2013, but was delayed by lawsuits, among other factors. The main contractor was finally issued a "Notice to Proceed" in early July 2014; the official groundbreaking for heavy construction on the project was held on September 30, 2014.

Most sections of the Regional Connector tunnel is built using the tunnel boring machine (TBM) construction method, though some sections (especially the locations of the three subway rail stations) use the cut-and-cover construction method with an emphasis on maintaining as much road access as possible during construction. Metro has an agreement with the Los Angeles Music Center to use the most advanced state of the art noise-suppression measures underneath 2nd Street where it passes Walt Disney Concert Hall and the Colburn School of Music. This commits Metro to use procedures to ensure that the rumble of trains does not intrude on the sound quality of recordings made in the venues or mar audiences' musical experience within this sensitive stretch of the tunnel.

Two modest, one-story brick buildings had to be demolished since the Little Tokyo/Arts District station would be moved underground and across the street. One of the structures existed since at least 1898 and both played an important role in the cultural life of the Little Tokyo neighborhood for decades.

By late 2017, one of the two tunnels had been completed; the second tunnel was completed in January 2018. Extra work and expense were required to work around century-old water and electric infrastructure beneath downtown Los Angeles. Metro had revised its estimate for the project completion to early 2023, more than two years after the original estimated completion date.

In 2020, due to the COVID-19 pandemic and the subsequent state-mandated closings of local businesses and stay-at-home orders that resulted in reduced traffic, the city of Los Angeles was able to shut down some local roads, allowing Metro to accelerate construction. In April 2022, Metro completed all trackwork as well as station platforms and system guideways.

Starting April 9, 2023, the project's final testing phase began. The A, E, and L Line trains ran through the newly built tunnel from Long Beach to Azusa and Santa Monica to East Los Angeles. The final work included station plaza, street restoration, and fencing construction. It opened on June 16, 2023.

== See also ==
- K Line
- D Line Extension
- Other rail tunnels connecting previously disjointed systems
  - Center City Commuter Connection (Philadelphia)
  - Oslo Tunnel
- Comparable light rail tunnels intended for capacity increases downtown
  - D2 Subway
  - Kombilösung Karlsruhe
