= Civic Center/Grand Park station =

Rapid transit station in Los Angeles, California

Civic Center/Grand Park
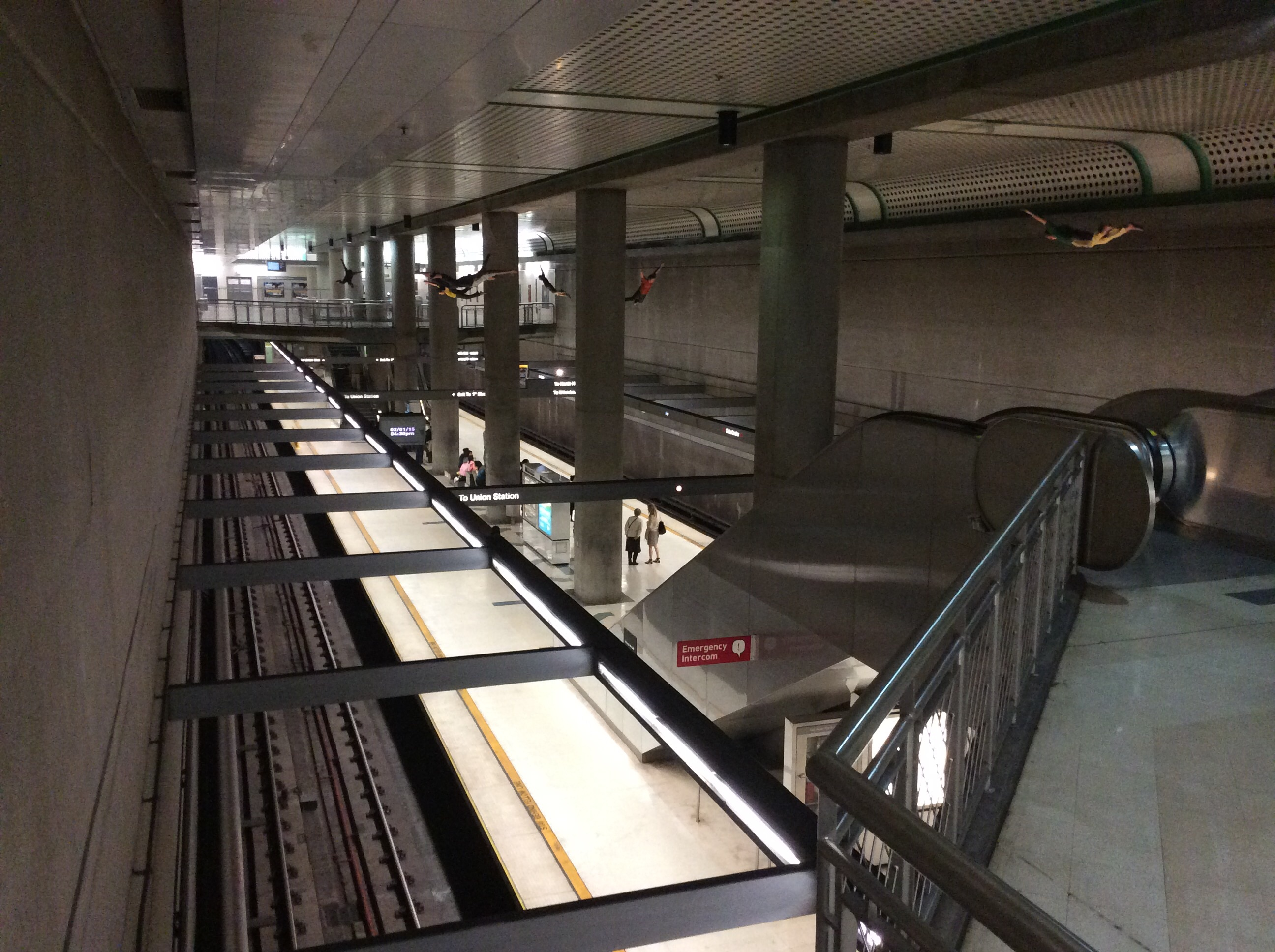
- Civic Center/Grand Park station platform as viewed from the mezzanine, 2015

General information
- Other names: Civic Center/Grand Park/Tom Bradley
- Location: 101 South Hill Street; Los Angeles, California
- Coordinates: 34.0543°N 118.2467°W
- Owner: Los Angeles Metro
- Platforms: 1 island platform
- Tracks: 2
- Connections: See connections section

Construction
- Structure type: Underground
- Parking: Paid parking nearby
- Cycle facilities: Metro Bike Share station, racks and lockers

History
- Opened: January 30, 1993
- Former names: Civic Center (1993–2013)

Passengers
- FY 2025: 2,353 (avg. wkdy boardings, rail only)

Services
| Preceding station | Metro Rail | Following station |
|---|---|---|
| Pershing Square toward North Hollywood | B Line | Union Station Terminus |
| Pershing Square toward Wilshire/La Cienega | D Line | Union Station Terminus |
| Preceding station | Metro Busway | Following station |
| Grand Avenue Arts/Bunker Hill toward Harbor Gateway or San Pedro | J Line (street service) | Union Station (stops en route) toward El Monte |
| Preceding station | Foothill Transit | Following station |
| Grand Avenue Arts/Bunker Hill toward Pico | Silver Streak (street service) | Historic Broadway One-way operation |
| Pershing Square One-way operation | Silver Streak (street service) | Union Station (stops en route) toward Montclair |
Location

Civic Center/Grand Park station is an underground rapid transit station on the B Line and D Line of the Los Angeles Metro Rail system. The station also has street level stops for the J Line of the Los Angeles Metro Busway system and the Foothill Transit Silver Streak. The station is located under Hill Street at its intersection with 1st Street. It is located in the Civic Center neighborhood of Los Angeles and serves nearby Grand Park.

The station is officially named Civic Center/Grand Park/Tom Bradley station after former Los Angeles mayor Tom Bradley, who had a pivotal role in turning the subway into reality.

== Service ==
=== Hours and frequency ===
B Line trains run every day between approximately 4:30 a.m. and midnight. D Line trains run every day between approximately 5 a.m. and midnight. Towards North Hollywood or Wilshire/La Cienega, trains operate every 10 minutes throughout the day. Early morning and night service is approximately every 20 minutes. Towards Union Station, trains run every five minutes throughout the day. Early morning and night service is approximately every 10 minutes.

J Line buses run 24 hours a day between El Monte, Downtown Los Angeles, and the Harbor Gateway Transit Center, as route 910. Some trips continue to San Pedro between 6 a.m. and 8 p.m. and are signed as Route 950. On weekdays, buses operate every four to eight minutes during peak hours. They operate every 10 minutes in the midday, 20 minutes during evenings, 40 minutes during nights, and every hour overnight. On weekends, buses arrive every 15 minutes most of the day. They operate every 20 minutes during evenings, 40 minutes during nights, and every hour overnight.

=== Connections ===
In addition to the rail and busway services, Civic Center/Grand Park station is a major hub for municipal bus lines. As of September 10, 2023, the following connections are available:

- Antelope Valley Transit Authority: 785*
- Big Blue Bus (Santa Monica): Rapid 10*
- City of Santa Clarita Transit: 799*
- Foothill Transit: 490*, 493*, 495*, 498*, 499*, 699*, 707
- LADOT Commuter Express: 409*, 419*, 422*, 423*, 431*, 437*, 438*, 448*, 534*
- LADOT DASH: A, B, D
- Los Angeles Metro Bus: 4, 10, 14, 28, 30, 33 (late night only), 37, 40, 45, 48, 70, 76, 78, 81, 90, 92, 94, Express 487*, Express 489
- Montebello Bus Lines: 90 Express*
- Torrance Transit: 4X*

Note: * indicates commuter service that operates only during weekday rush hours.

== Station artwork ==
The station features a colorful art installation titled I Dreamed I Could Fly, which has six fiberglass persons in flight, intended to be representative of the human spiritual voyage. The installation was designed by Jonathan Borofsky.
