= Grand Avenue Arts/Bunker Hill station =

Light rail station

Grand Av Arts/Bunker Hill
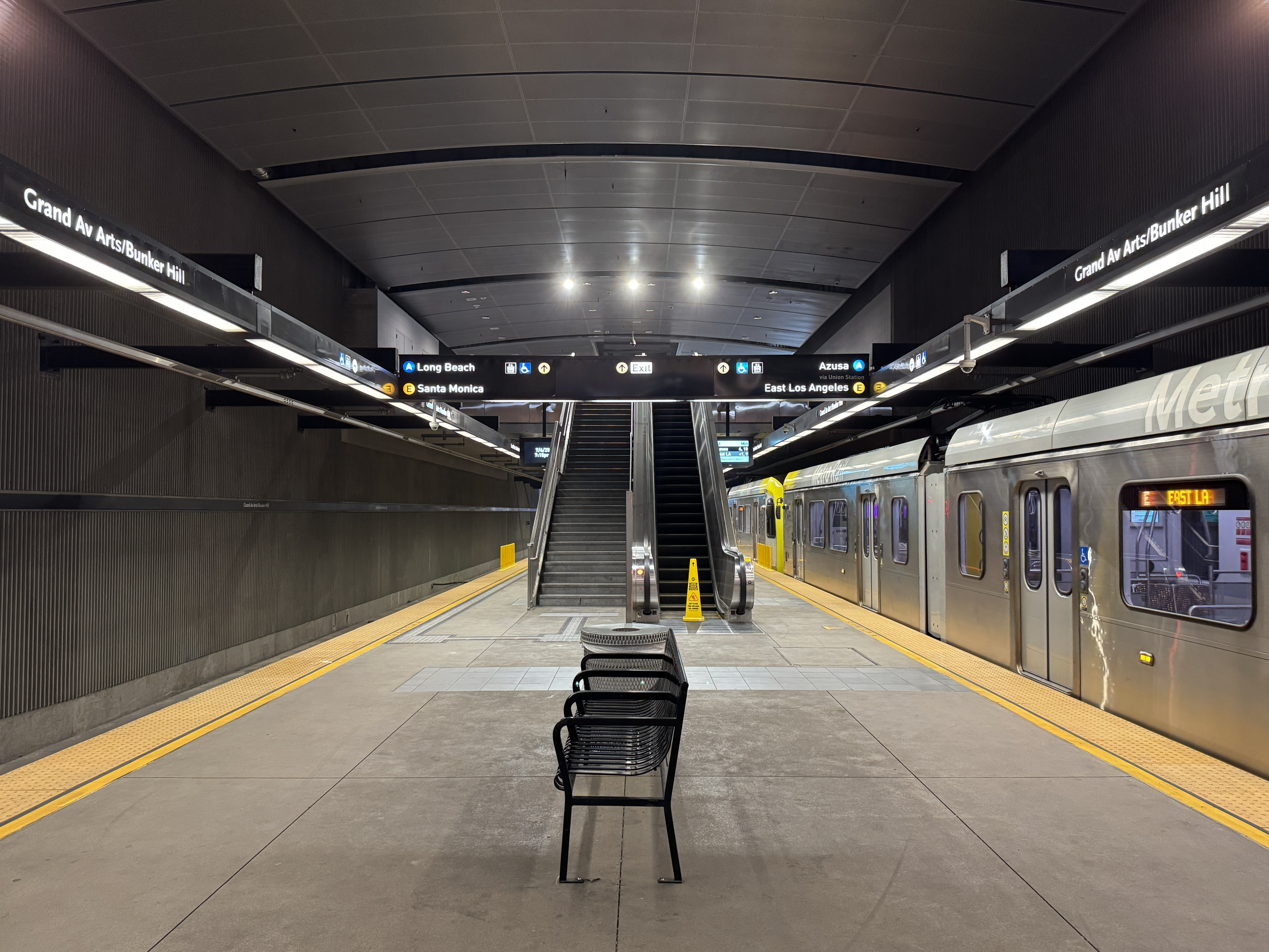
- Grand Avenue Arts/Bunker Hill station platform

General information
- Location: 211 South Hope Street; Los Angeles, California
- Coordinates: 34.054997°N 118.251996°W
- Owner: Los Angeles County Metropolitan Transportation Authority
- Platforms: 1 island platform
- Tracks: 2
- Connections: City of Commerce Transit; Foothill Transit; LADOT DASH; Los Angeles Metro Bus

Construction
- Structure type: Underground
- Depth: 120 feet (37 m)
- Parking: Paid parking nearby
- Cycle facilities: Metro Bike Share station, racks, lockers
- Accessible: Yes

History
- Opened: June 16, 2023
- Former names: 2nd Place/Hope

Passengers
- FY 2025: 1,647 (avg. wkdy boardings, rail only)

Services
Preceding station	Metro Rail	Following station
7th Street/Metro Center toward Long Beach	A Line	Historic Broadway toward Pomona
7th Street/Metro Center toward Santa Monica	E Line	Historic Broadway toward East LA
Preceding station	Metro Busway	Following station
Pershing Square toward Harbor Gateway or San Pedro	J Line (street service)	Civic Center/Grand Park toward El Monte
Preceding station	Foothill Transit	Following station
Pershing Square toward Pico	Silver Streak (street service)	Civic Center/Grand Park One-way operation
Location

Grand Avenue Arts/Bunker Hill station is an underground light rail station on the A and E lines of the Los Angeles Metro Rail system. The station also has street level stops for the J Line of the Los Angeles Metro Busway system and the Foothill Transit Silver Streak. The station is located under the intersection of 2nd Place and Hope Street, near the Grand Avenue Arts district and in the Bunker Hill neighborhood of Downtown Los Angeles, after which the station is named. In planning documents, the station was originally referred to as 2nd Place/Hope.

== Service ==
=== Station layout ===
The station is connected to The Broad, and to Grand Avenue, by a pedestrian bridge. The platforms are located 100 feet (30 m) below surface level, making Grand Av Arts/Bunker Hill the deepest station on the Metro Rail network. The station has six high speed elevators from the upper plaza to concourse.

=== Hours and frequency ===
A Line service hours are from approximately 4:30 a.m. and 11:45 p.m. daily. Trains operate every 8 minutes during peak hours, Monday to Friday. Trains run every 10 minutes, during midday on weekdays and weekends, from 9:00 a.m. to 7:00 p.m. Night and early morning service is approximately every 20 minutes every day.

E Line service hours are from approximately 4:30 a.m. and 11:45 p.m daily. Trains operate every 8 minutes during peak hours, Monday to Friday. Trains run every 10 minutes, during midday on weekdays and weekends, from 9:00 a.m. to 7:00 p.m. Night and early morning service is approximately every 20 minutes every day.

J Line buses run 24 hours a day between El Monte, Downtown Los Angeles, and the Harbor Gateway Transit Center, as route 910. Some trips continue to San Pedro between 6 a.m. and 8 p.m. and are signed as Route 950. On weekdays, buses operate every four to eight minutes during peak hours. They operate every 10 minutes in the midday, 20 minutes during evenings, 40 minutes during nights, and every hour overnight. On weekends, buses arrive every 15 minutes most of the day. They operate every 20 minutes during evenings, 40 minutes during nights, and every hour overnight.

=== Connections ===
As of December 15, 2024, the following connections are available:

- City of Commerce Transit: 600
- Foothill Transit: 490*, 493*, 495*, 498*, 499*, 699*
- LADOT DASH: B
- Los Angeles Metro Bus: 53, 55, 60, 62, 70, 76, 78

Note: * indicates commuter service that operates only during weekday rush hours.

== Notable places nearby ==
The station's name reflects the location within walking distance of Los Angeles's World Trade Center which includes museums and arts centers, such as The Broad, Museum of Contemporary Art, the Walt Disney Concert Hall, the Roy & Edna Disney CalArts Theatre (REDCAT), the Music Center, and California Plaza. Other nearby sites include:

- Ahmanson Theatre
- Bank of America Plaza
- Brockman Building
- California Club
- Center Theatre Group
- City National Plaza
- Colburn School
- Dorothy Chandler Pavilion
- Fine Arts Building
- Grand Park
- Los Angeles Department of Water and Power Headquarters
- Mark Taper Forum
- Millennium Biltmore Hotel
- Oviatt Building
- Richard J. Riordan Central Library
- Stanley Mosk Courthouse
- Superior Oil Company Building
- Westin Bonaventure Hotel
- Wells Fargo Center
- Wilshire Grand Center
