= LATTC/Ortho Institute station =

Los Angeles Metro Rail station

LATTC/Ortho Institute
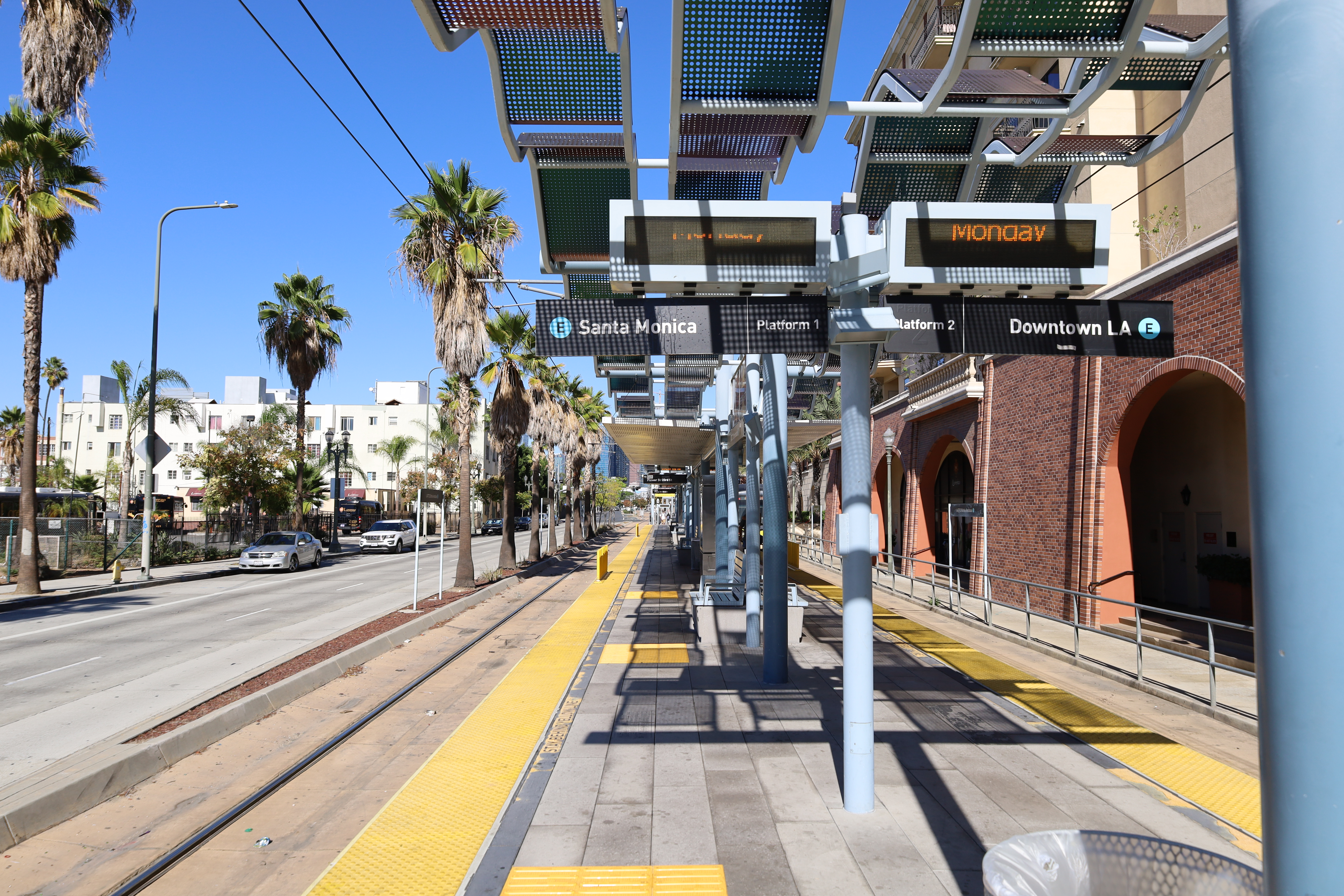
- LATTC/Ortho Institute station platform in 2022

General information
- Other names: Los Angeles Trade–Technical College/Orthopaedic Institute for Children
- Location: 2460 South Flower Street; Los Angeles, California
- Coordinates: 34.0302°N 118.2730°W
- Owner: Los Angeles County Metropolitan Transportation Authority
- Platforms: 1 island platform
- Tracks: 2
- Connections: LADOT DASH; Los Angeles Metro Bus; Torrance Transit

Construction
- Structure type: At-grade
- Parking: Paid parking nearby
- Cycle facilities: Metro Bike Share station, and racks
- Accessible: Yes

History
- Opened: April 28, 2012
- Former names: 23rd Street (2012–2014)

Passengers
- FY 2026: 2,112 (avg. wkdy boardings, rail only)

Services
Preceding station	Metro Rail	Following station
Jefferson/USC toward Santa Monica	E Line	Pico toward East LA
Preceding station	Metro Busway	Following station
37th Street/USC (stops en route) toward Harbor Gateway or San Pedro	J Line (street service)	Grand/LATTC toward El Monte
Location

LATTC/Ortho Institute station, officially Los Angeles Trade–Technical College/Orthopaedic Institute for Children station, is an at-grade light rail station on the E Line of the Los Angeles Metro Rail system. The station is located alongside Flower Street between 23rd Street and Adams Boulevard. The station is located near the Los Angeles Trade–Technical College (LATTC) and the Orthopaedic Institute for Children (Ortho Institute), after which the station is named. In addition to the LATTC campus and the Ortho Institute, the station also serves the North University Park neighborhood. The station also has nearby stops for the J Line of the Los Angeles Metro Busway system, southbound buses stop on Flower Street, across from the station at both 23rd Street and Adams Boulevard and northbound buses stop on Figueroa Street, one block to the west.

== Service ==
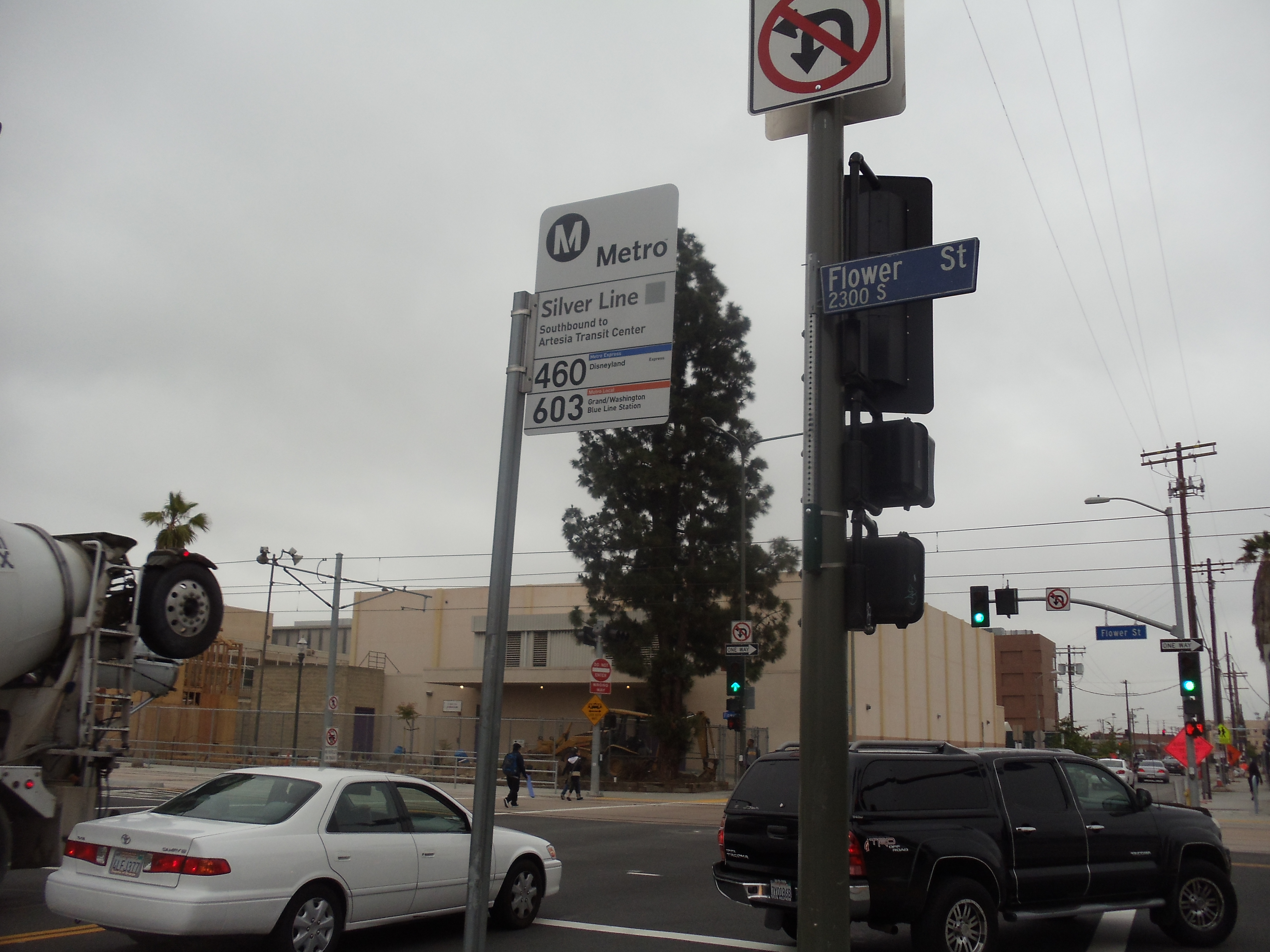
Metro J Line stop at Flower Street and 23rd Street

=== Hours and frequency ===
E Line service hours are from approximately 4:30 a.m. and 11:45 p.m daily. Trains operate every 8 minutes during peak hours, Monday to Friday. Trains run every 10 minutes, during midday on weekdays and weekends, from 9:00 a.m. to 7:00 p.m. Night and early morning service is approximately every 20 minutes every day.

J Line buses run 24 hours a day between El Monte, Downtown Los Angeles, and the Harbor Gateway Transit Center, as route 910. Some trips continue to San Pedro between 6 a.m. and 8 p.m. and are signed as Route 950. On weekdays, buses operate every four to eight minutes during peak hours. They operate every 10 minutes in the midday, 20 minutes during evenings, 40 minutes during nights, and every hour overnight. On weekends, buses arrive every 15 minutes most of the day. They operate every 20 minutes during evenings, 40 minutes during nights, and every hour overnight.

=== Connections ===
As of December 15, 2024, the following connections are available:

- Los Angeles Metro Bus: 37, 38, 55, 81, 93, Express 460
- LADOT DASH: F, King-East
- Torrance Transit: 4X*

Note: * indicates commuter service that operates only during weekday rush hours.

== Notable places nearby ==
The station is within walking distance of the following notable places:

- Los Angeles Trade–Technical College
- Mount St. Mary's College
- Orthopaedic Institute for Children
- St. John's Episcopal Cathedral
- St. Vincent de Paul Catholic Church
- Orthopaedic Hospital Medical Magnet High School

== Station artwork ==
The station's art was created by artist Christofer C. Dierdorff. Entitled The Intimacy of Place, the installation uses photographs of the fronts and backs of the heads of local people, creating intimate portraits that show each individual in the context of her/his role in the community.
