= 7th Street/Metro Center station =

Light rail and rapid transit station in Los Angeles, California

7th St/Metro Center
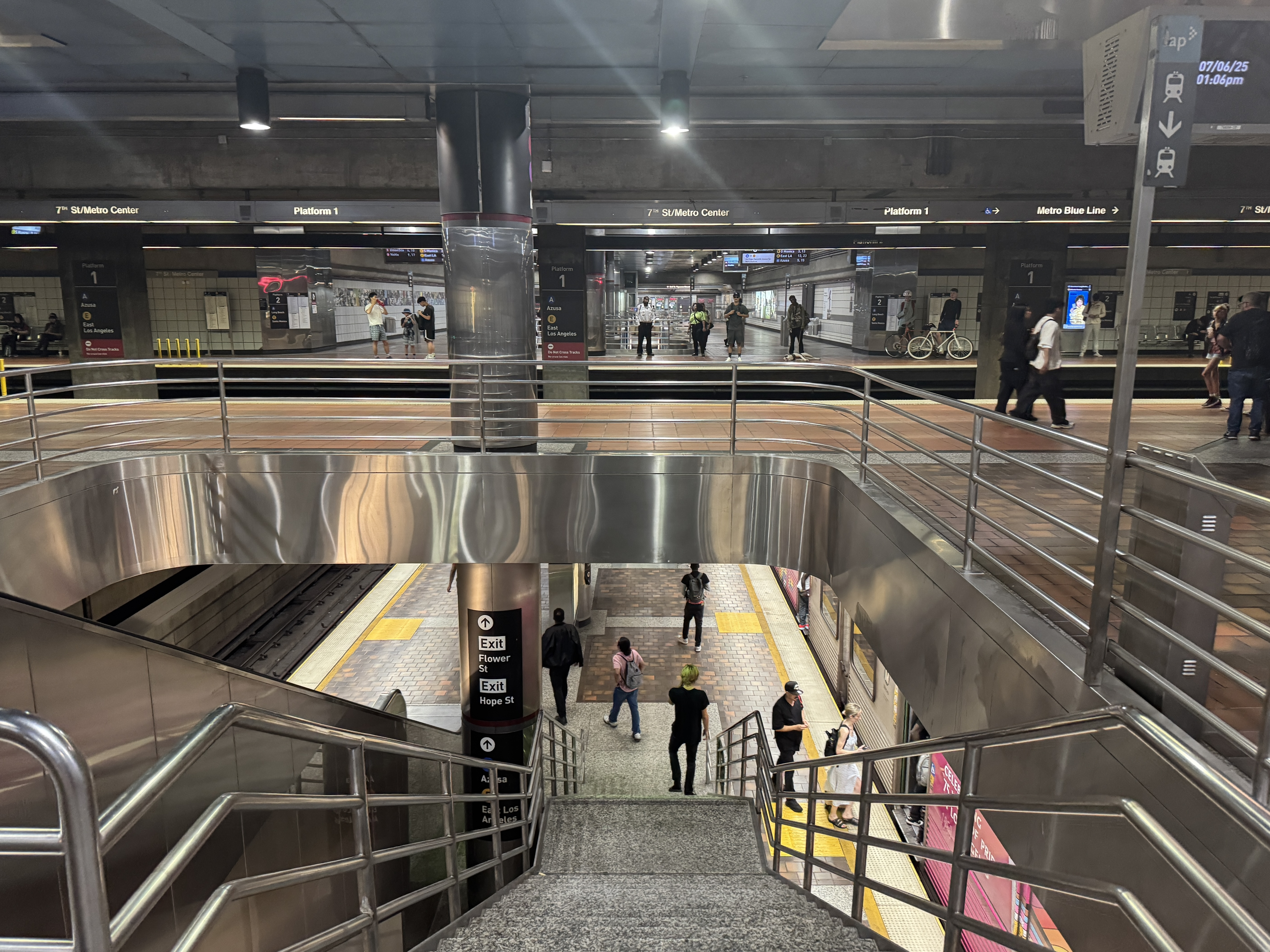
- The tracks for the A and E Lines on the upper level cross over the tracks for the B and D Lines on the lower level, 2025

General information
- Other names: 7th Street/Metro Center/Julian Dixon
- Location: 660 South Figueroa Street; Los Angeles, California
- Coordinates: 34.0487°N 118.2587°W
- Owner: Los Angeles Metro
- Platforms: 2 side platforms (light rail); 1 island platform (subway)
- Tracks: 4
- Connections: See Connections section

Construction
- Structure type: Underground
- Parking: Paid parking nearby
- Cycle facilities: Metro Bike Share station
- Accessible: Yes

History
- Opened: February 15, 1991

Passengers
- FY 2026: 25,092 (avg. wkdy boardings, rail only)

Services
Preceding station	Metro Rail	Following station
Pico toward Long Beach	A Line	Grand Avenue Arts/Bunker Hill toward Pomona
Westlake/MacArthur Park toward North Hollywood	B Line	Pershing Square toward Union Station
Westlake/MacArthur Park toward Wilshire/La Cienega	D Line	Pershing Square toward Union Station
Pico toward Santa Monica	E Line	Grand Avenue Arts/Bunker Hill toward East LA
Preceding station	Metro Busway	Following station
Pico (stops en route) toward Harbor Gateway or San Pedro	J Line (street service)	Pershing Square (stops en route) toward El Monte
Preceding station	Foothill Transit	Following station
Pico (stops en route) Terminus	Silver Streak (street service)	Pershing Square toward Montclair
Location

7th Street/Metro Center station is an underground light rail and rapid transit station on the A, B, D, and E lines of the Los Angeles Metro Rail system. The station also has street level stops for the J Line of the Los Angeles Metro Busway system. The station is located under 7th Street, after which the station is named, at its intersections with Figueroa, Flower and Hope Streets.

It is officially named 7th Street/Metro Center/Julian Dixon station after former U.S. Rep. Julian Dixon, who had a pivotal role in obtaining the federal funding that enabled construction of the Metro Rail system.

== History ==
7th Street/Metro Center was constructed by the Southern California Rapid Transit District, which later became part of today's LA Metro, as part of the first 4.5-mile (7.2 km) minimum operating segment (MOS-1) of the Metro Rail subway (now B Line). Ground was broken for the project on September 29, 1986.

The upper level of this station, used by light rail trains, opened on February 15, 1991, nearly two years before the rest of the MOS-1 subway stations. However, the opening was several months after the rest of the Blue Line's (now A Line) stations. The lower level subway platform opened with the rest of the MOS-1 segment stations on January 30, 1993.

As part of the Expo Line project (now the E Line), Metro invested nearly $2 million in station enhancements, completed shortly before service began to La Cienega/Jefferson station in April 2012. Improvements included a new dispatch booth and upgraded signage.

The station initially served as the northern terminus of the A Line and the eastern terminus of the E Line. Both lines were extended beyond the station on June 16, 2023, with the completion of the Regional Connector Transit Project.

In 2023, Metro presented station renovation renderings to update lighting, signage, and faregates. By April 2025, taller faregates have been installed at the station.

== Service ==
=== Station layout ===
7th Street/Metro Center was the first underground station to open on the Los Angeles Metro Rail system and consists of three sub-surface levels.

The main concourse is located on the second level below street level and is bisected by the light rail (A and E Lines) side platforms: Platform 1 and Platform 2. Platform 1 is for A Line going to Pomona and for E Line going to East Los Angeles, while Platform 2 is for A Line going to Long Beach and for E Line going to Santa Monica. Moving between Platform 1 and 2 is possible with an overhead walkway, or using the escalators or stairs to go down to the island platform.

The heavy rail (B and D Lines) island platform is situated on the third level below street level. A small mezzanine on the first underground level connects the two light rail side platforms.

At street level, the J Line bus rapid transit stops at the station, with northbound buses stopping along Flower Street and southbound buses along Figueroa Street.

The station has direct access to The Bloc Los Angeles, a shopping center, via a pedestrian entrance connecting the mall to the subway concourse.

7th Street/Metro Center is one of only two stations in the system to feature underground side platforms; the other is Wilshire/Vermont.

=== Hours and frequency ===
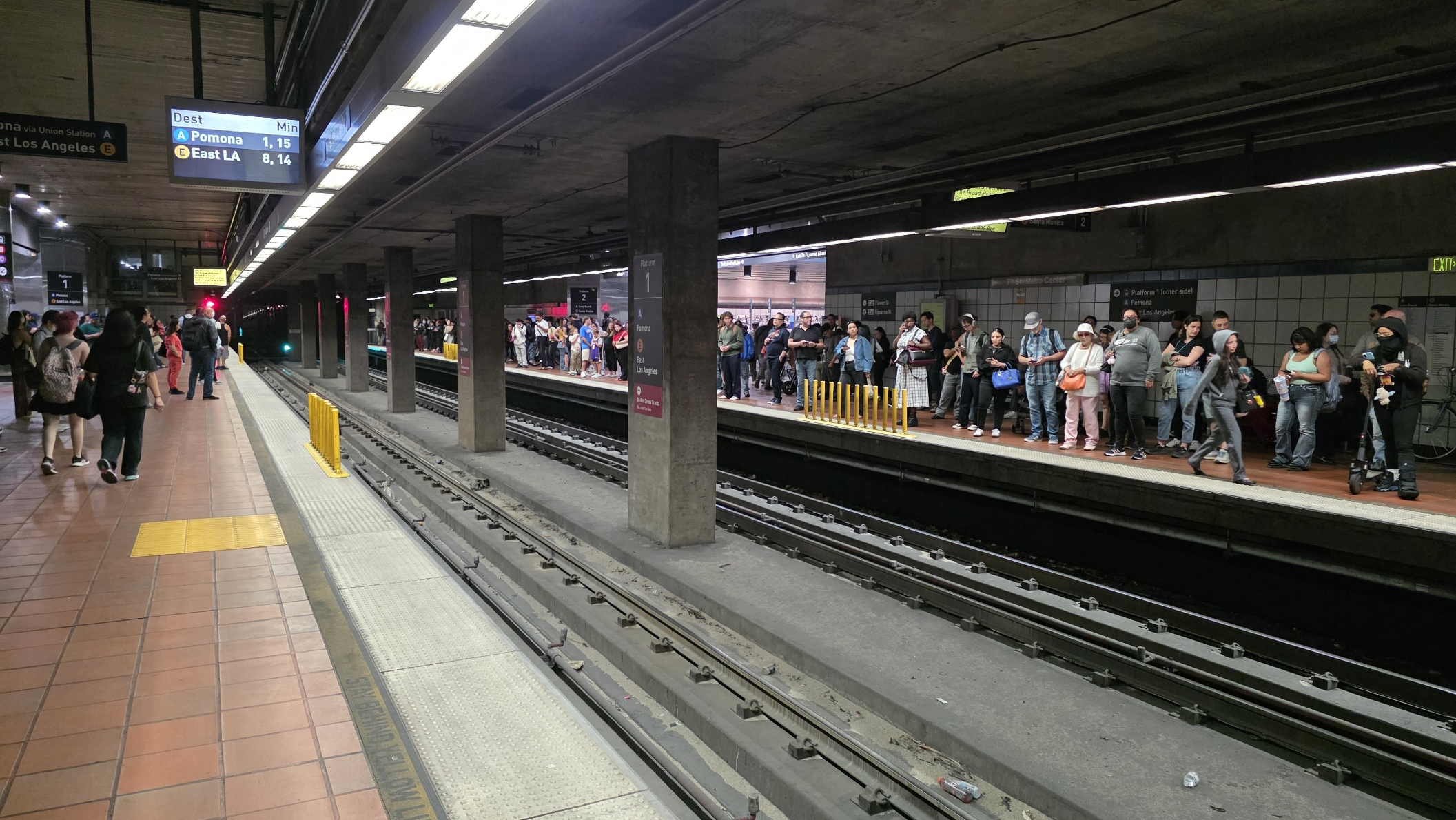
A Line & E Line platforms taken from Platform 1

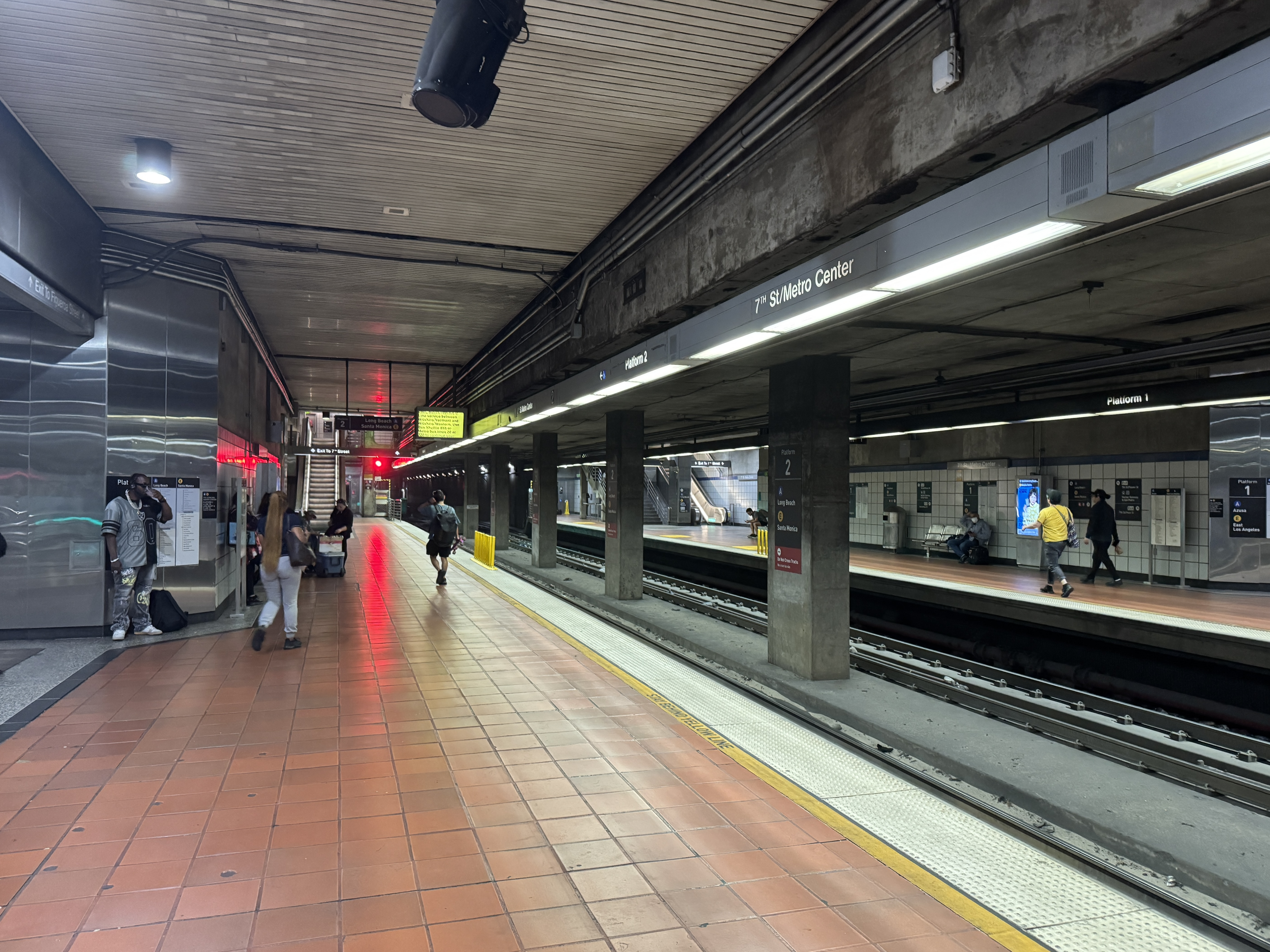
A Line & E Line platforms taken from Platform 2

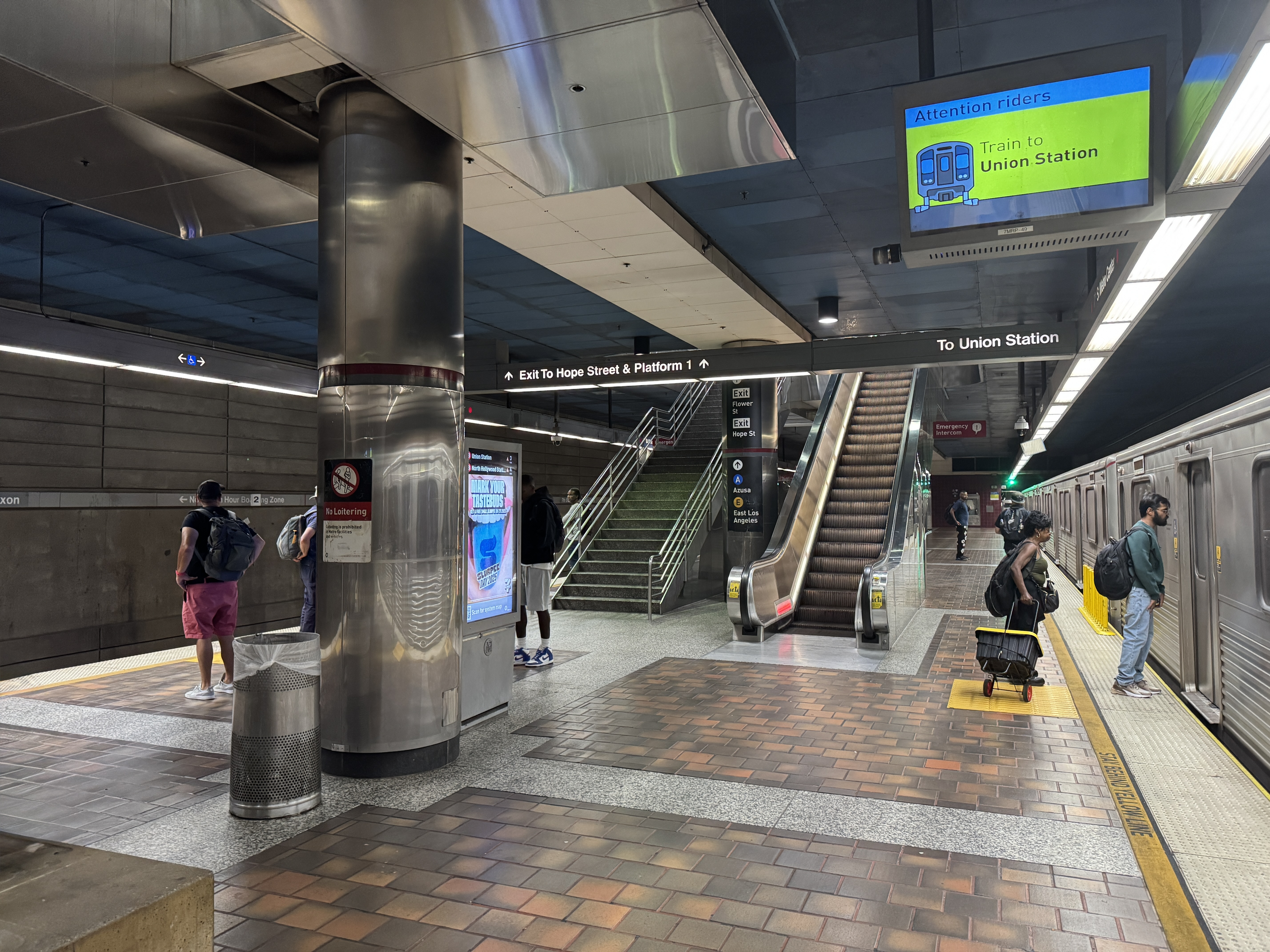
B Line & D Line platforms (lower level)

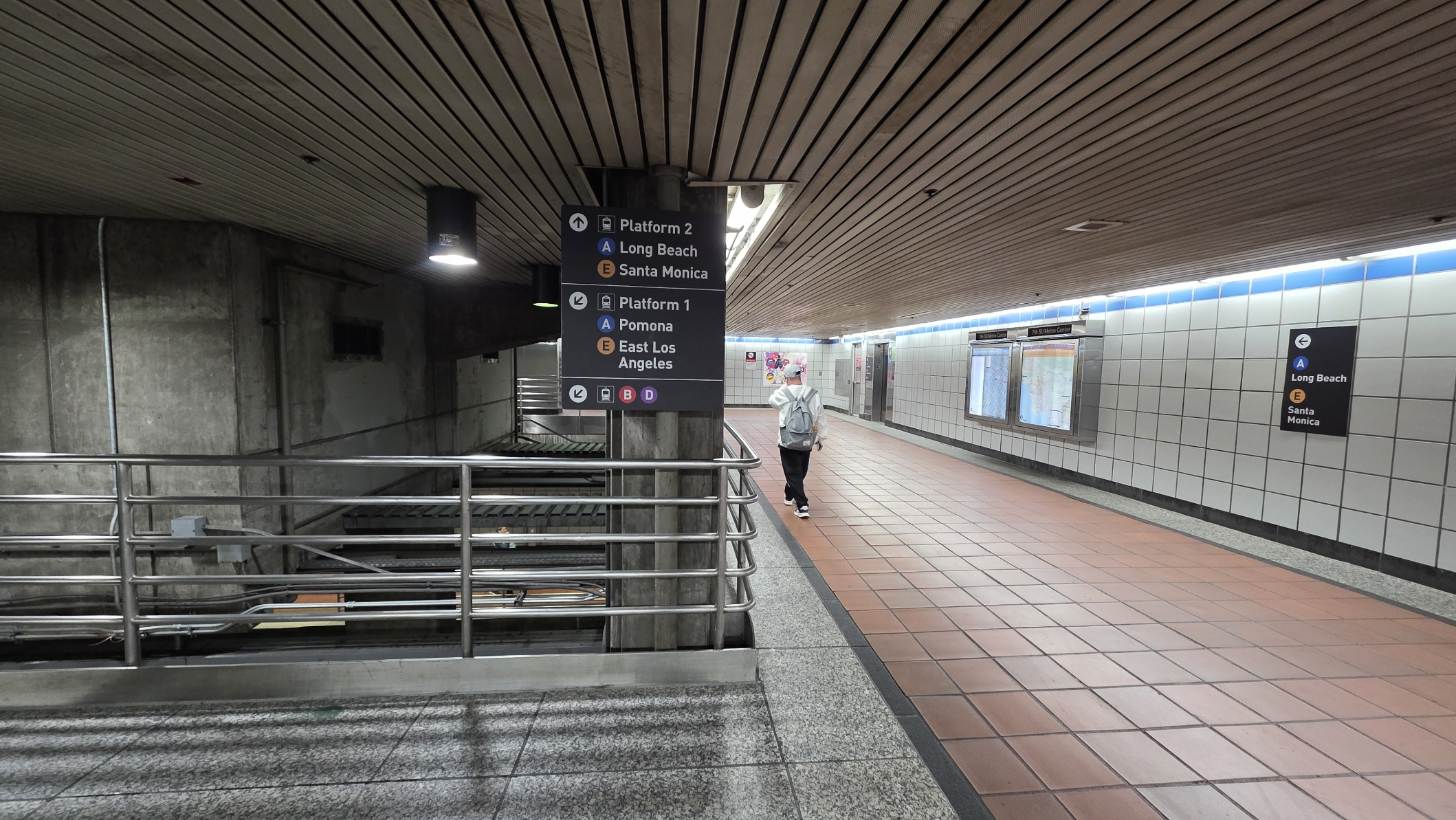
Overhead walkway connecting Platforms 1 and 2

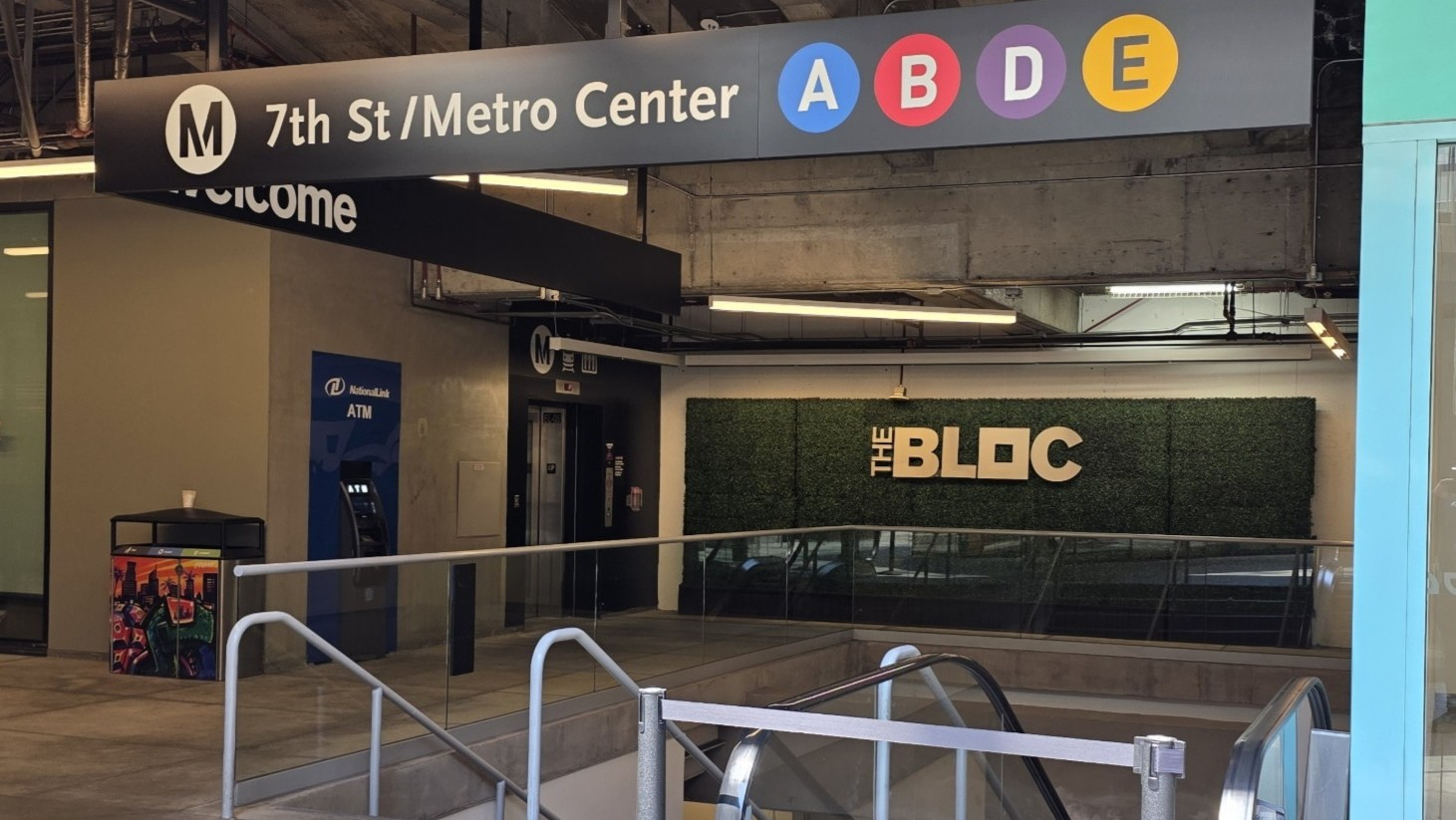
The Bloc Exit

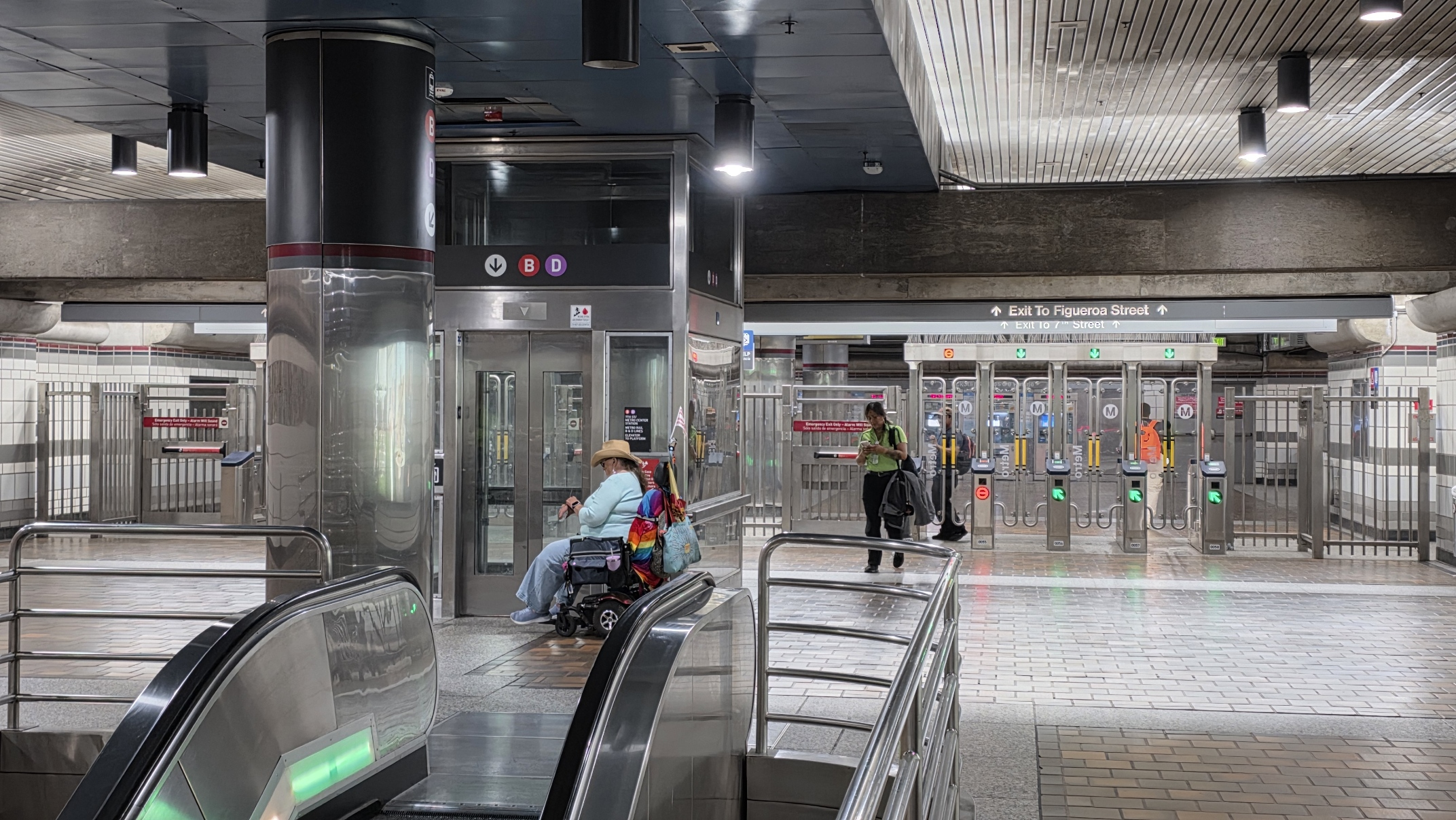
Figueroa Street Exit

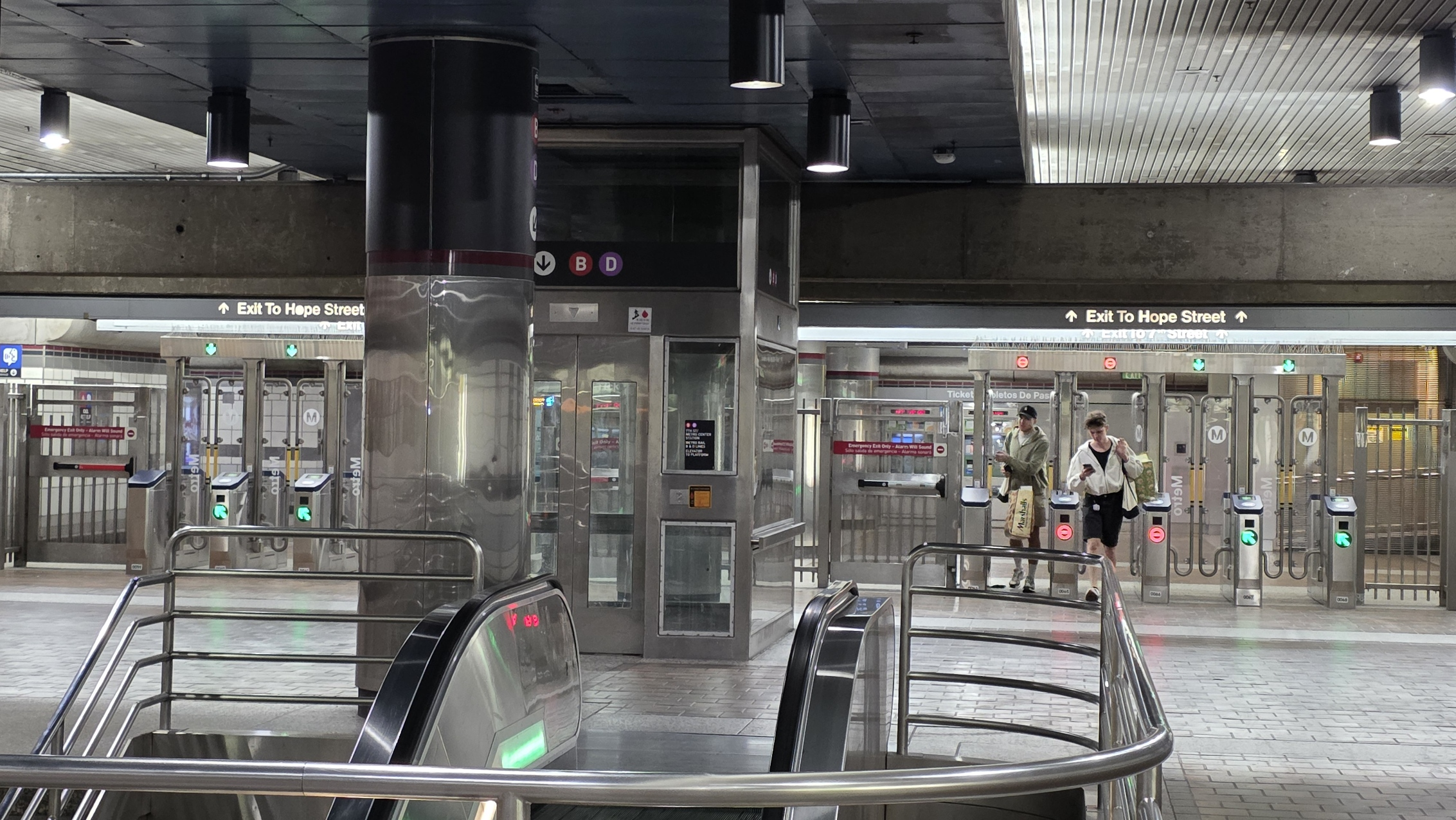
Hope Street Exit

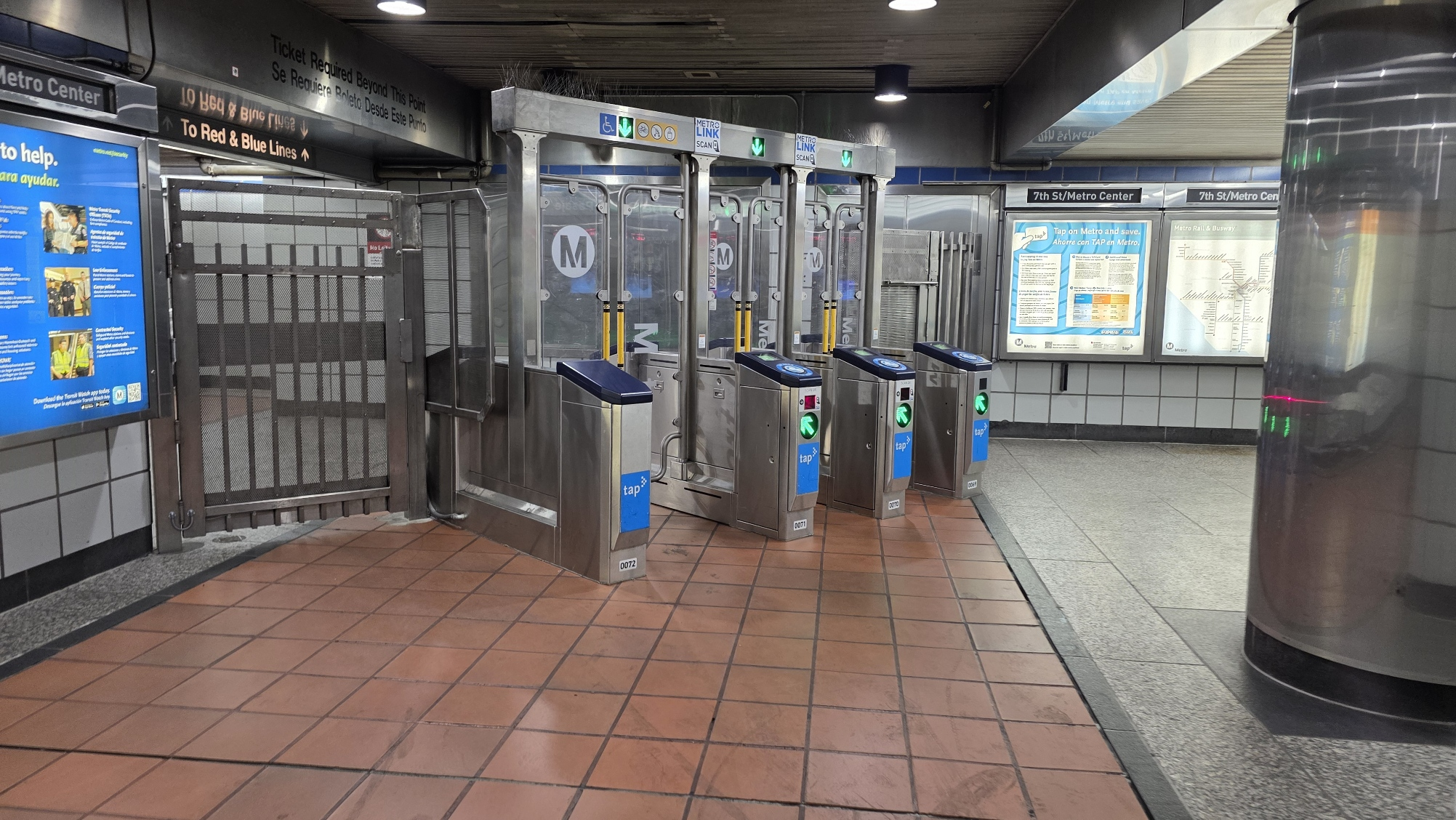
Flower Street Exit

J Line Stop at Figueroa and 7th

A Line service hours are from approximately 4:30 a.m. and 11:45 p.m. daily. Trains operate every 8 minutes during peak hours, Monday to Friday. Trains run every 10 minutes, during midday on weekdays and weekends, from 9:00 a.m. to 7:00 p.m. Night and early morning service is approximately every 20 minutes every day.

B Line trains run every day between approximately 4:30 a.m. and midnight. D Line trains run every day between approximately 5 a.m. and midnight. Towards North Hollywood or Wilshire/La Cienega, trains operate every 10 minutes throughout the day. Early morning and night service is approximately every 20 minutes. Towards Union Station, trains run every five minutes throughout the day. Early morning and night service is approximately every 10 minutes.

E Line service hours are from approximately 4:30 a.m. and 11:45 p.m daily. Trains operate every 8 minutes during peak hours, Monday to Friday. Trains run every 10 minutes, during midday on weekdays and weekends, from 9:00 a.m. to 7:00 p.m. Night and early morning service is approximately every 20 minutes every day.

J Line buses run 24 hours a day between El Monte, Downtown Los Angeles, and the Harbor Gateway Transit Center, as route 910. Some trips continue to San Pedro between 6 a.m. and 8 p.m. and are signed as Route 950. On weekdays, buses operate every four to eight minutes during peak hours. They operate every 10 minutes in the midday, 20 minutes during evenings, 40 minutes during nights, and every hour overnight. On weekends, buses arrive every 15 minutes most of the day. They operate every 20 minutes during evenings, 40 minutes during nights, and every hour overnight.

=== Connections ===
In addition to the rail and busway services, 7th Street/Metro Center station is a major hub for municipal bus lines. As of spring 2024, the following connections are available:

- Los Angeles Metro Bus: 14, 16, 18, 20, 37, 51, 53, 55, 60, 62, 66, 70, 76, 78, 81, Express 460, Express 487, Express 489*, Rapid 720
- Antelope Valley Transit Authority: 785*
- Big Blue Bus (Santa Monica): Rapid 10*
- City of Santa Clarita Transit: 799*
- Foothill Transit: 490*, 493*, 495*, 498*, 499*, 699*
- LADOT Commuter Express: 409*, 422*, 423*, 431*, 437*, 438*, 448*, 534*
- LADOT DASH: A, B, E, F
- Montebello Bus Lines: 40, 50, 90 Express*
- Torrance Transit: 4X*

Note: * indicates commuter service that operates only during weekday rush hours.

== Notable places nearby ==
- The Bloc
- FIGat7th

== As a filming location ==
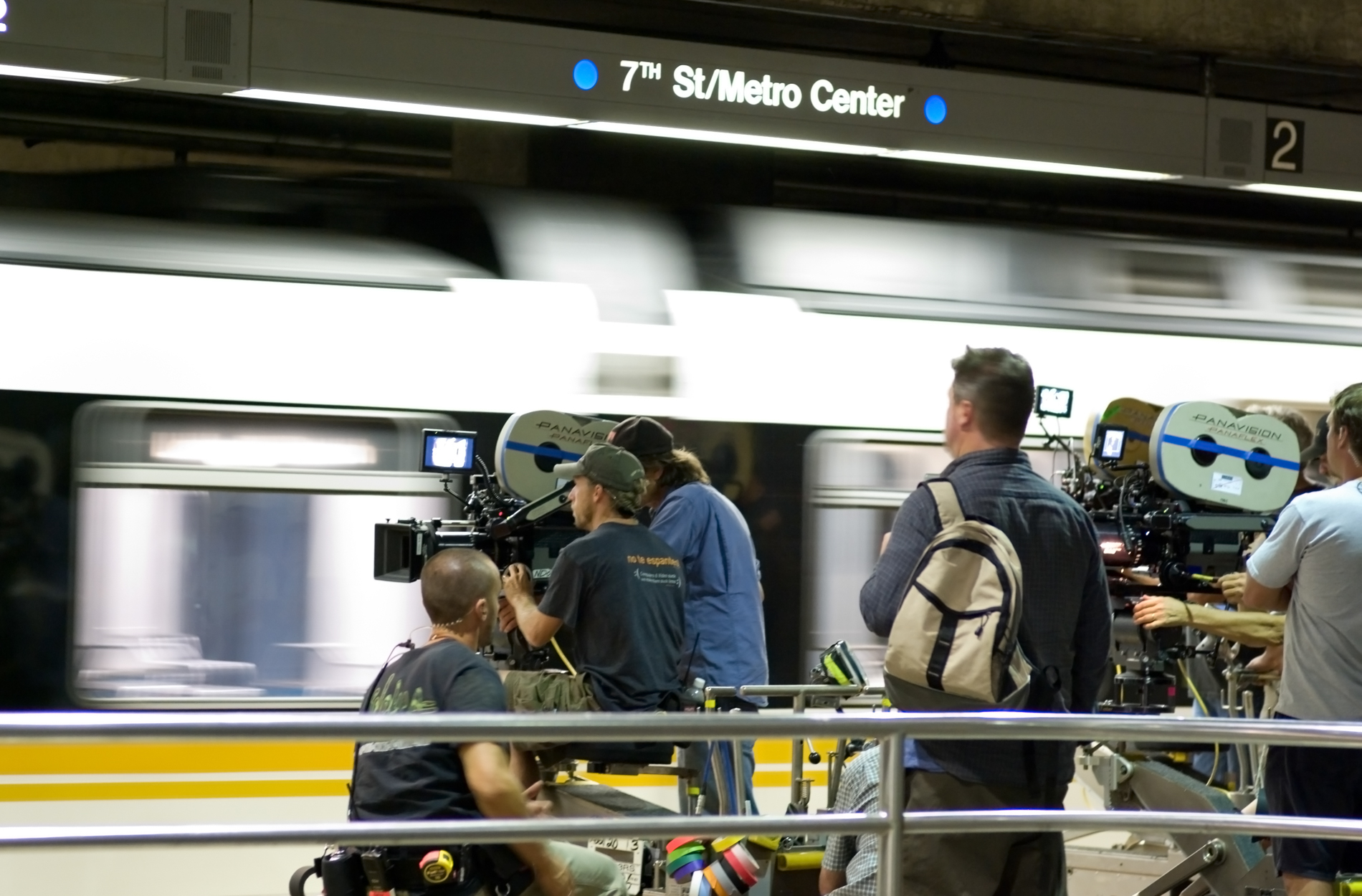
Film shoot on the A Line platform of 7th St/Metro Center in 2007

Due to the design of the station and the popularity of the film industry in Los Angeles, the station has been featured in various movies and music videos over the years.

=== Film and television ===
- The Dark Knight Rises
- Captain Marvel
- Roman J. Israel, Esq.
- Collateral
- The Italian Job
- 24 season 3, episodes 23/24

=== Music videos ===
- The Weeknd - After Hours (2020)
- Taylor Swift - Delicate (2018)
- System of a Down - Lonely Day (2006)
- Everlast - What It's Like (1998)
