= Los Angeles Department of Transportation =

Transport municipal agency in Los Angeles, California, USA

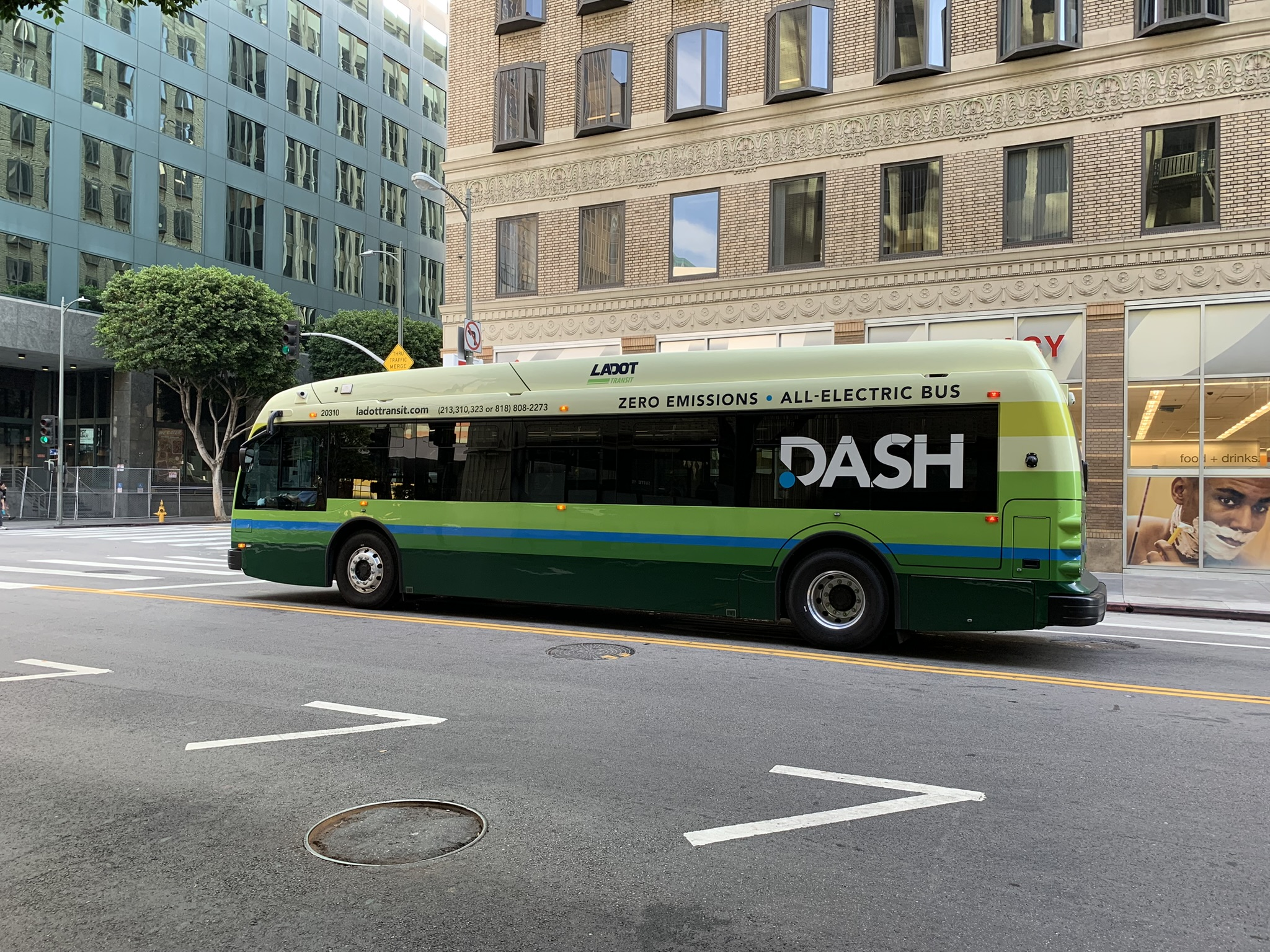
- Downtown DASH Proterra Catalyst bus in July 2023
- Headquarters: Caltrans District 7 Headquarters Building
- Locale: Los Angeles, California, US
- Service type: Bus services, paratransit, traffic operations, transportation planning
- Routes: 15 Commuter Express; 31 DASH
- Operator: MV Transportation (bus services)
- Website: ladot.lacity.org ladottransit.com

The Los Angeles Department of Transportation (LADOT) is a municipal government agency and transportation authority of the city of Los Angeles.

The department oversees transportation planning, design, construction, maintenance, and operations within the city of Los Angeles. LADOT was created by city ordinance, and is run by a general manager appointed by the mayor of Los Angeles, under the oversight of a citizens' commission also appointed by the mayor. LADOT is best known for providing public transportation to the city of Los Angeles. It currently operates the second-largest fleet in Los Angeles County, after the county's Los Angeles County Metropolitan Transportation Authority. LADOT consists of over 300 vehicles, serving nearly 30 million passengers a year and operating over 800,000 hours.

LADOT also develops the traffic signal timing and transportation planning for the city. Actual road maintenance and construction is provided by the Los Angeles City Department of Public Works through StreetsLA, formerly the Bureau of Street Services, and the Bureau of Engineering. LADOT performs many transportation related duties, with six main operating groups: Parking Enforcement & Traffic Control, Operations, Project Delivery, Parking Management & Regulations, Transit Services, and Administration.

== Routes ==
=== DASH ===

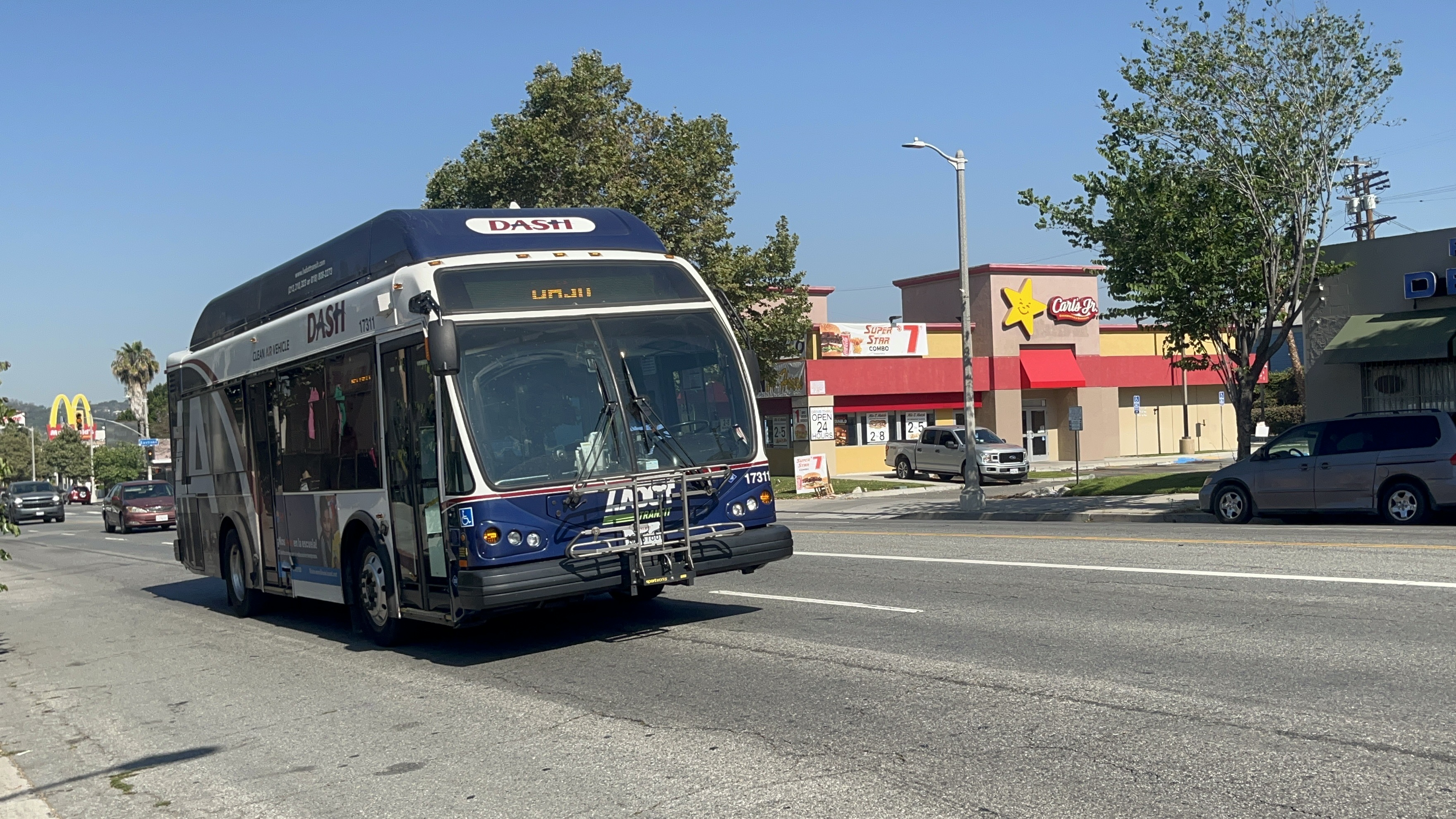
A typical DASH bus.

DASH is LADOT's system of neighborhood circulator bus services. DASH buses serve to provide localized service in a neighborhood, and for passengers making longer trips, acting as a feeder to the countywide Metro Bus and Metro Rail system.

The name DASH started as acronym for Downtown Area Short Hop, the original purpose of the service. Since its launch in Downtown Los Angeles, DASH has expanded to 27 other neighborhoods in the City of Los Angeles.

DASH buses are 30 feet (9.1 m) or 35 feet (11 m) long, making it easier to navigate in dense neighborhoods with narrower streets and tighter turns compared to a typical 40-foot (12 m) transit bus. All buses in the DASH fleet are powered by either low-emission CNG or are zero-emission battery electric buses.

Route	Terminals		Via	Notes
Downtown A	Downtown LA; Palmetto St & Hewitt St		1st St	Serves Civic Center/Grand Park, 7th St/Metro Center and Little Tokyo/Arts District stations
Downtown B	Chinatown; Bernard St & Broadway		Grand Av	Serves Chinatown station and LA Union Station
Downtown D	Downtown LA; Patsaouras Transit Plaza	Downtown LA; Washington Bl & Olive St	Spring St, Main St	Serves Grand/LATTC station
Downtown E	Westlake; Westlake/MacArthur Park station	Los Angeles; Trinity St & Washington Bl	7th St	Serves 7th Street/Metro Center station
Downtown F	Downtown LA; Beaudry Av & 3rd St		Figueroa St	Serves 7th Street/Metro Center station, Crypto.com Arena, Los Angeles Convention Center, USC, Expo Park/USC station and Expo/Vermont station
Beachwood Canyon	Hollywood; Hollywood/Vine station	Hollywood Hills; Beachwood Dr & Westshire Dr	Beachwood Rd	
Boyle Heights/East LA	Los Angeles; Marengo St & Mission Rd	East LA; Herbert Av & Whittier Bl	Rowan Av	Serves Indiana station
Chesterfield Square	South LA; 54th St & Western Av	Huntington Park; Pacific Bl & Florence Av	Florence Av	Serves Florence station
Crenshaw	Crenshaw; MLK Jr. Bl & Magic Johnson Theater		Crenshaw Bl	Serves Martin Luther King Jr. station, Baldwin Hills Crenshaw Plaza and Expo/La Brea station; Clockwise and Counter Clockwise route
El Sereno/City Terrace	El Sereno; Huntington Dr & Lowell Av	East LA; Rowan Av & Dozier St	Huntington Dr	
Fairfax	Beverly Grove; 3rd St & Sherbourne Dr	Mid-Wilshire; La Brea Av & 6th St	Fairfax Av	Serves Wilshire/La Brea station, Wilshire/Fairfax station and Beverly Center
Highland Park/Eagle Rock	Highland Park; San Pascual Av & Comet St	Eagle Rock; Colorado St & Eagledale Av	Colorado Bl	Serves Highland Park station
Hollywood	Hollywood; Fountain Av & Vine St		Franklin Av	Serves Hollywood/Highland station, Hollywood/Vine station, Vermont/Sunset station and Vermont/Santa Monica station; Clockwise and Counter Clockwise route
Hollywood/Wilshire	Hollywood; Hollywood/Vine station	Koreatown; Wilshire/Western station	Western Av, Gower St	
King-East	Los Angeles; 37th St & Grand Av		Martin Luther King Jr. Bl	Serves San Pedro Street station, Los Angeles Trade–Technical College and LATTC/Ortho Institute station; Clockwise and Counter Clockwise route
Leimert/Slauson	Crenshaw; MLK Bl & Magic Johnson Theater		Martin Luther King Jr. Bl	Serves Hyde Park station, Leimert Park station and Martin Luther King Jr. station; Clockwise and Counter Clockwise route
Lincoln Heights/Chinatown	Chinatown; Main St & Cesar Chavez Av		Broad Way, Main St	Serves Chinatown station; Clockwise and Counter Clockwise route
Midtown	Crenshaw; MLK Bl & Magic Johnson Theater	Mid-Wilshire; Redondo Bl & Packard St	Crenshaw Bl	Serves Expo/Crenshaw station
North Hollywood	North Hollywood; North Hollywood station		Vineland Av	Clockwise and Counter Clockwise route
North Hollywood	North Hollywood; Lankershim Bl & Chandler Bl		Vineland Av	Clockwise and Counter Clockwise route
Northridge/Reseda	Northridge; Northridge station		Reseda Bl	
Observatory/Los Feliz	Hollywood; Vermont/Sunset station	Los Angeles; Griffith Observatory	Vermont Canyon Rd, Vermont Av	
Panorama City/Van Nuys	Van Nuys; Van Nuys station		Van Nuys Bl	Clockwise and Counter Clockwise route
Pico Union/Echo Park	Echo Park; Echo Park Av & Donaldson St	Downtown LA; Grand/LATTC station	Echo Park Av	Serves Westlake/MacArthur Park station
Pueblo del Rio	Los Angeles; Vernon station	Florence-Graham; Wilmington Av & Gage Av	Long Beach Av	
San Pedro	San Pedro; Western Av & 25th St	San Pedro; Western Av & Park Western Plaza	1st St	
Southeast	Los Angeles; 37th St & Grand Av		Vermont Av	Clockwise and Counter Clockwise route
Sylmar	Sylmar; Sylmar/San Fernando station	Sylmar; Los Angeles Mission College	Hubbard St	
Van Nuys/Studio City	Studio City; Laurel Canyon Bl & Ventura Bl		Moorpark St, Hazeltin Av	Serves Westfield Fashion Square, Van Nuys station, Woodman station, Los Angeles Valley College and Valley College station; Clockwise and Counter Clockwise route
Van Nuys/Studio City	Studio City; Ventura Bl & Laurel Canyon Bl		Moorpark St, Hazeltin Av	Serves Westfield Fashion Square, Van Nuys station, Woodman station, Los Angeles Valley College and Valley College station; Clockwise and Counter Clockwise route
Vermont/Main	South LA; Vermont Av & 59th St		Vermont Av, Main St	Clockwise and Counter Clockwise route
Watts	Willowbrook; 119th St & Wilmington Av		Avalon Bl	Serves Avalon station and 103rd Street/Watts Towers station; Clockwise and Counter Clockwise route
Watts	Willowbrook; 120th St & Wilmington Av		Avalon Bl	Serves Avalon station and 103rd Street/Watts Towers station; Clockwise and Counter Clockwise route
Wilmington	Wilmington; Avalon Bl & L St		PCH, Avalon Bl, Wilmington Bl	Clockwise and Counter Clockwise route
Wilshire Center/Koreatown	Koreatown; San Marino St & Western Av		Vermont Av, Western Av	Serves Wilshire/Western station and Wilshire/Vermont station; Clockwise and Counter Clockwise route
Wilshire Center/Koreatown	Koreatown; James M. Wood Bl & Western Av		Vermont Av, Western Av	Serves Wilshire/Western station and Wilshire/Vermont station; Clockwise and Counter Clockwise route

=== Commuter Express ===
Commuter Express is an express bus service, consisting of 15 routes, all but one running during rush hours only. Service started in 1985. Fares are based on a flat rate for travel on streets plus an extra charge based on the distance traveled on freeways.

Most Commuter Express buses are 40-foot (12 m) or 45-foot (14 m) MCI D-Series motorcoaches, offering a more comfortable ride on these longer routes. All buses in the Commuter Express fleet are powered by low-emission CNG engines or are zero-emission battery electric buses.

Route 142 operates more like a normal transit route, operating daily at all hours, using more typical transit buses. The route was previously operated by Long Beach Transit.

Routes 419, 423, 431, 437, 438, and 448 are former Southern California Rapid Transit District lines that were transferred to LADOT.

Unless otherwise noted, all services operates towards Downtown LA during the morning rush and from Downtown LA during the afternoon rush. For the purposes of this chart, closed-door means that customers are not allowed to use buses for local trips and open-door means that customers are allowed to use buses for local trips.

Route	Terminals		via	Notes
142	San Pedro; Miner St & Harbor Bl	Long Beach; Downtown Long Beach station	7th St, SR47, I-710, Ocean Bl	Daily service; Open-door along the entire route
409	Sylmar; Foothill Bl & Glenoaks Bl	Downtown LA; Hill St & 12th St	San Fernando Valley: Foothill Bl; Downtown LA: Flower St/Figueroa St, 7th St	Closed-door along the entire route, except at Glendale Park & Ride; Serves Grand Avenue Arts/Bunker Hill station and 7th Street/Metro Center station
419	Chatsworth; Chatsworth station	Downtown LA; USC	San Fernando Valley: Devonshire St; Downtown LA: Hill St, Figueroa St	Closed-door along the entire route, except at Devonshire St & Balboa Bl; Serves Civic Center/Grand Park station, Pershing Square station, Crypto.com Arena, and Los Angeles Convention Center
422	Exposition Park; USC	Thousand Oaks; The Oaks	Downtown LA: Figueroa St/Flower St; Ventura County: Thousand Oaks Bl, Agoura Rd	Service operates towards Thousand Oaks in the AM rush and towards Downtown LA in the PM rush; Closed-door within Downtown LA, open-door elsewhere; Serves Los Angeles Convention Center, Crypto.com Arena, Grand Avenue Arts/Bunker Hill station and Thousand Oaks Transportation Center
423	Thousand Oaks; Thousand Oaks Transportation Center	Downtown LA; USC	Ventura County: Agoura Rd, Ventura Bl; Downtown LA: Figueroa St/Flower St	Closed-door along the entire route, except at Ventura Bl & Topanga Canyon Bl and Encino Park and Ride; Serves Grand Avenue Arts/Bunker Hill station, 7th Street/Metro Center station, Crypto.com Arena, and Los Angeles Convention Center
431	Westwood; Sepulveda Bl & Ohio Av	Downtown LA; LA Union Station	Westside: Wilshire Bl, Beverly Glen Bl; Downtown LA: Venice Bl, Figueroa St/Flower St, Grand St/Olive St	Closed-door along the entire route; Serves UCLA and Grand Avenue Arts/Bunker Hill station
437	Venice; Pacific Av & Washington Bl	Downtown LA; Temple St & Vignes St	Westside: Culver Bl, Jefferson Bl; Downtown LA: Figueroa St/Flower St, Grand St/Olive St	Closed-door along the entire route; Serves Culver City station, Washington/Fairfax Transit Hub and Grand Avenue Arts/Bunker Hill station
438	Redondo Beach; Palos Verdes Bl & Via Valencia	Downtown LA; LA Union Station	Beach Cities: Highland Av, Hermosa Av; Downtown LA: Figueroa St/Flower St	Closed-door along the entire route; Operates towards Downtown LA in the AM rush and towards Redondo Beach in the PM rush; For reverse commute service see Route 439; Serves Los Angeles Convention Center, Crypto.com Arena and Grand Avenue Arts/Bunker Hill station
438	Redondo Beach; Redondo Beach station (short line)	Downtown LA; LA Union Station	Beach Cities: Highland Av, Hermosa Av; Downtown LA: Figueroa St/Flower St	Closed-door along the entire route; Operates towards Downtown LA in the AM rush and towards Redondo Beach in the PM rush; For reverse commute service see Route 439; Serves Los Angeles Convention Center, Crypto.com Arena and Grand Avenue Arts/Bunker Hill station
439	Downtown LA; LA Union Station	El Segundo; El Segundo station	Downtown LA: Figueroa St/Flower St; El Segundo: Imperial Hwy, Douglas St	Closed-door within El Segundo, open-door elsewhere; Reverse commute service: operates towards El Segundo in the AM rush and towards Downtown LA in the PM rush; For traditional commute service see Route 438; Serves Pershing Square station and Pico station
448	Rancho Palos Verdes; Crest Rd & Crenshaw Bl	Downtown LA; Temple St & Los Angeles St	South Bay: Hawthorne Bl, Pacific Coast Hwy; Downtown LA: Figueroa St/Flower St	Closed-door along the entire route, except at Harbor Freeway C Line station; Serves Harbor Freeway C Line station, Los Angeles Convention Center, Crypto.com Arena and Grand Avenue Arts/Bunker Hill station
534	Downtown LA; LA Union Station	Westwood; Wilshire Bl & Veteran Av	Downtown LA: Figueroa St/Flower St, 1st St; Westside: Wilshire Bl, Olympic Bl via Beverly Hills	Operates towards Westwood in the AM rush and towards Downtown in the PM rush; Closed-door along the entire route; Serves Civic Center/Grand Park station, Grand Avenue Arts/Bunker Hill station, 7th Street/Metro Center station, Crypto.com Arena, and Westfield Century City
549	Encino; Encino Park and Ride	Pasadena; Lake station	Burbank Bl, SR134	Service is provided in both directions during peak hours; This is a service with only designated pick-up points between cities operating as a limited-stop service; Open-door along the entire route; Serves Sherman Oaks Galleria, Los Angeles Valley College, North Hollywood station, Burbank Media District and Memorial Park station
573	Mission Hills; Chatsworth St & Orion St	Century City; Constellation Bl & Century Park West	San Fernando Valley: Balboa Bl; Westwood: Gayley Av, Wilshire Bl	Service is provided in both directions during peak hours; Closed-door along the entire route, except at Balboa Bl & Devonshire St and Encino Park and Ride; Serves Balboa station and UCLA
574	Sylmar; Sylmar/San Fernando station	Redondo Beach; Space Park Dr & Aviation Bl	San Fernando Valley: Balboa Bl, Chatsworth St; South Bay: Sepulveda Bl, Aviation Bl	Service operates towards the South Bay in the AM rush and towards Sylmar in the PM rush; Closed-door along the entire route, except at Balboa Bl & Devonshire St, and Encino Park and Ride; Serves Balboa station, Encino Park and Ride, LAX/Metro Transit Center, and El Segundo station
Union Station/Bunker Hill Shuttle	Downtown LA; LA Union Station	Bunker Hill; Hope St & 4th St	Grand Av	Timed to meet Metrolink trains; Operates towards Bunker Hill in the AM rush and towards Union station in the PM rush; Open-door along the entire route

== Bus fleet ==
=== DASH ===
Image	Make/Model	Fleet numbers	Year	Notes
	ENC E-Z Rider II BRT CNG	12315-12336	2012	
	ENC E-Z Rider II BRT CNG	13301-13322	2013	
	ENC E-Z Rider II BRT CNG	15355-15366, 17305	2016	
	ENC E-Z Rider II BRT CNG	17306-17309	2017	
	ENC E-Z Rider II BRT CNG	17310-17314	2018	
	ENC Axess BRT CNG	12301-12314	2012	
	ENC Axess BRT CNG	13323-13328	2013	
	ENC Axess BRT CNG	15367-15374	2016	
	Gillig BRT CNG 29'	15301-15354	2015	
	BYD K9S	17301-17304	2017	
	Proterra Catalyst BE35	20301-20325	2020	Used only on Downtown DASH routes.
	BYD K7M	21301	2020	
	BYD K7M	21302-21330	2021	
	BYD K7M	22301-22400	2023	

=== Commuter Express ===
Image	Make/Model	Fleet numbers	Year	Notes
	MCI D4000CT CNG	11401-11402	2010	
	MCI D4000CT CNG	12401-12431	2011	
	MCI D4000CT CNG	12432-12462	2012	
	MCI D4000CT CNG	12463-12493	2013	
	MCI D4500CT CNG	16401-16409	2016	
	MCI D4500CT CNG	17401-17406	2017	
	MCI D4500CT CNG	19401-19405	2020	
	ENC Axess BRT 35 CNG	13401-13403	2013	Exclusively used on line 142.
	BYD C10M	21401	2021	
