= Hellman Building =

Hellman Building may refer to:

- Hellman Bank Building
- Herman W. Hellman Building
- Isaias W. Hellman Building
- several other Herman W. Hellman buildings
