= Pico station =

Los Angeles Metro Rail station

Pico
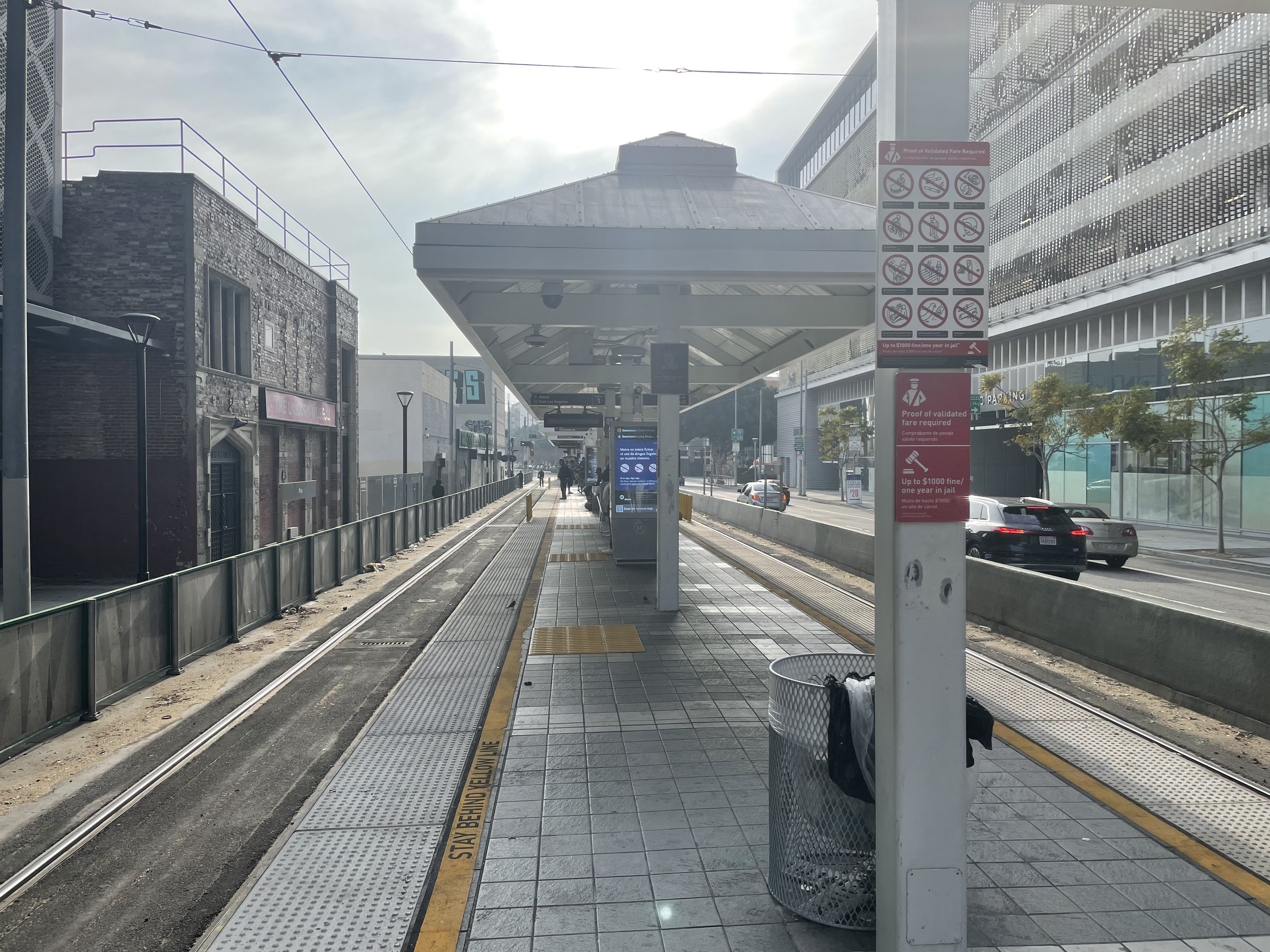
- Pico station platform, January 2024

General information
- Other names: Pico/Chick Hearn
- Location: 1236 South Flower Street; Los Angeles, California
- Coordinates: 34.0402°N 118.2667°W
- Owner: Los Angeles County Metropolitan Transportation Authority
- Platforms: 1 island platform
- Tracks: 2
- Connections: See Connections section

Construction
- Structure type: At-grade
- Parking: Paid parking nearby
- Cycle facilities: Metro Bike Share station
- Accessible: Yes

History
- Opened: July 14, 1990
- Rebuilt: November 2, 2019

Passengers
- FY 2026: 5,683 (avg. wkdy boardings, rail only)

Services
| Preceding station | Metro Rail | Following station |
|---|---|---|
| Grand/LATTC toward Long Beach | A Line | 7th Street/Metro Center toward Pomona |
| LATTC/Ortho Institute toward Santa Monica | E Line | 7th Street/Metro Center toward East LA |
| Preceding station | Metro Busway | Following station |
| Grand/LATTC toward Harbor Gateway or San Pedro | J Line (street service) | 7th Street/Metro Center (stops en route) toward El Monte |
| Preceding station | Foothill Transit | Following station |
| Terminus | Silver Streak (street service) | 7th Street/Metro Center (stops en route) toward Montclair |
Location

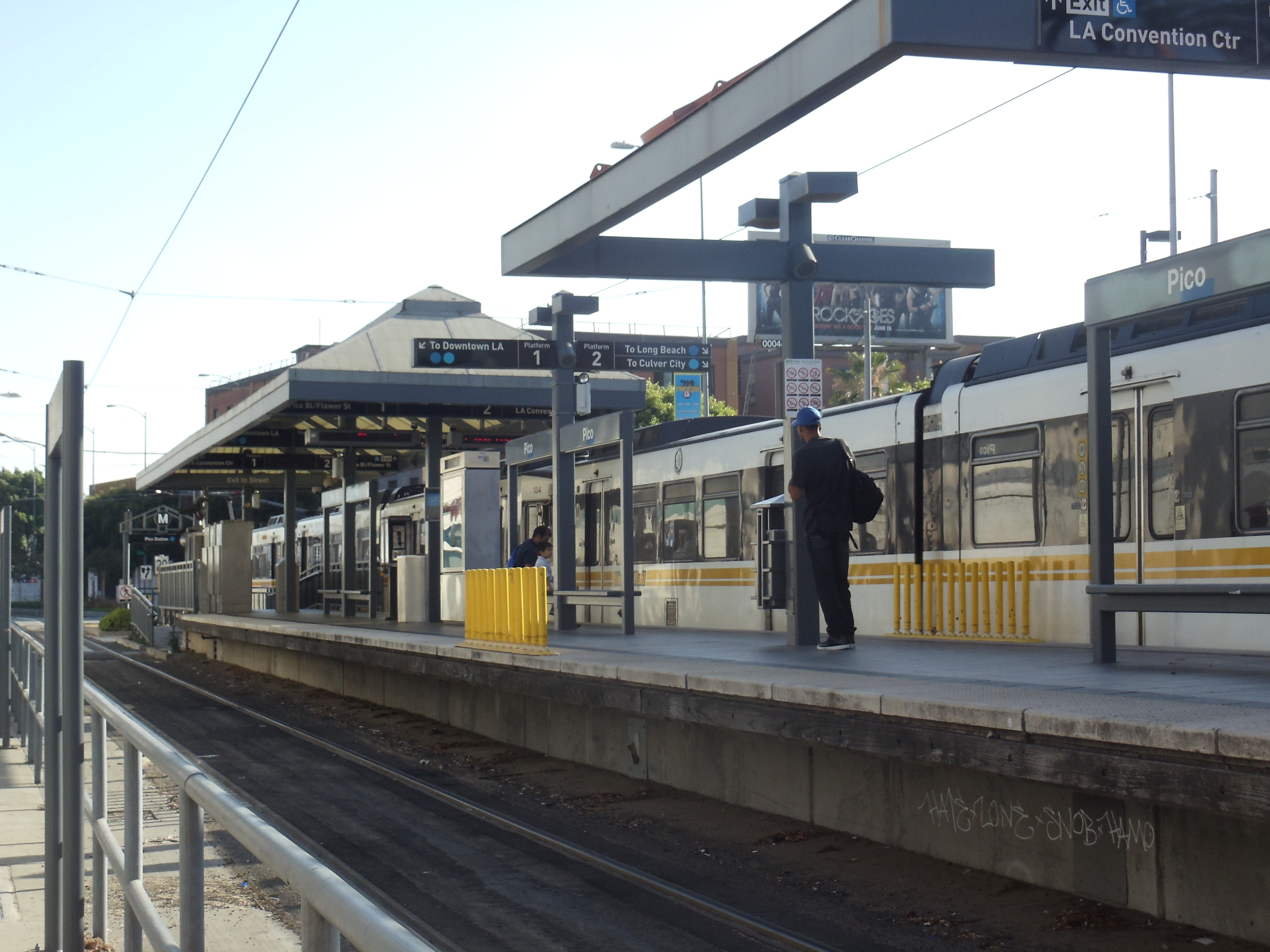
The station in 2012

Pico station is an at-grade light rail station on the Los Angeles Metro Rail system located on Flower Street at the intersection of Pico Boulevard. The station also has southbound bus stops on Flower Street, across from the station and northbound bus stops on Figueroa Street, one block to the west. Pico station serves the South Park and Figueroa/Convention District neighborhoods.

Officially named Pico/Chick Hearn station after Chick Hearn, the longtime play-by-play announcer for the Los Angeles Lakers, it was also temporarily renamed "Kobe station" to commemorate professional basketball player Kobe Bryant's last game on April 13, 2016. It was once again temporarily renamed "LeBron Station" to welcome LeBron James to the Lakers.

== History ==
Pico station opened along with the Blue Line (now A Line) on July 14, 1990, and was the site of opening day celebrations. Because the underground portion of the line was not yet complete, this station served as the northern terminus for the line until February 1991 when 7th St/Metro Center Station opened.

In 2025, the station featured in the album cover of CORTIS’s first Extended Play, Color outside the lines.

During the 2028 Summer Olympics, the station will serve spectators traveling to events at the Los Angeles Convention Center, Crypto.com Arena and Peacock Theater.

== Service ==
=== Station layout ===
Pico station has an at-grade, island platform station designed to accommodate Metro light rail vehicles. The station's entrance is on the northeast corner of Flower/Pico.

Metro added gates and flashing lights at this station during late December 2011, as part of a set of safety enhancements that were added as part of the Expo Line project. Access upgrades were added in 2018 due to increased use and development of the area. Metro has held discussions regarding placing the station underground or expanding the light rail capacity in time for the 2028 Olympics. There has also been discussion of expanding Pico station or putting it underground by utilizing funds under a proposed congestion pricing program in Downtown Los Angeles.

North of this station is the Flower Street Tunnel, which connects Pico station to 7th St/Metro Center Station via Flower Street. The tunnel's portal is just south of 11th Street on Flower Street.

=== Hours and frequency ===
A Line service hours are from approximately 4:30 a.m. and 11:45 p.m. daily. Trains operate every 8 minutes during peak hours, Monday to Friday. Trains run every 10 minutes, during midday on weekdays and weekends, from 9:00 a.m. to 7:00 p.m. Night and early morning service is approximately every 20 minutes every day.

E Line service hours are from approximately 4:30 a.m. and 11:45 p.m daily. Trains operate every 8 minutes during peak hours, Monday to Friday. Trains run every 10 minutes, during midday on weekdays and weekends, from 9:00 a.m. to 7:00 p.m. Night and early morning service is approximately every 20 minutes every day.

J Line buses run 24 hours a day between El Monte, Downtown Los Angeles, and the Harbor Gateway Transit Center, as route 910. Some trips continue to San Pedro between 6 a.m. and 8 p.m. and are signed as Route 950. On weekdays, buses operate every four to eight minutes during peak hours. They operate every 10 minutes in the midday, 20 minutes during evenings, 40 minutes during nights, and every hour overnight. On weekends, buses arrive every 15 minutes most of the day. They operate every 20 minutes during evenings, 40 minutes during nights, and every hour overnight.

=== Connections ===
As of December 15, 2024, the following connections are available:

- LADOT Commuter Express: 419*, 422*, 423*, 438*, 448*
- LADOT DASH: F
- Los Angeles Metro Bus: 30, 81, Express 460
- Torrance Transit: 4X*

Note: * indicates commuter service that operates only during weekday rush hours.

== Notable places nearby ==
The station is within walking distance of the following notable places:

- Crypto.com Arena
- California Hospital Medical Center
- Circa Complex
- Fashion Institute of Design & Merchandising, Los Angeles Campus
- L.A. Live
- Los Angeles Convention Center
- Oceanwide Plaza
- Peacock Theater
- U.S. Bank Tower
