= History of Los Angeles Metro Rail and Busway =

The history of the Los Angeles Metro Rail and Busway systems begin in the early 1970s, when the traffic-choked region began planning a rapid transit system. The region's first dedicated busway, the El Monte Busway, opened along Interstate 10 in 1973, and the region's first light rail line, the Blue Line (now the A Line) opened in 1990. Today the system includes over 120 miles (190 km) of light rail lines, including multiple new lines constructed in the 2010s and 2020s, along with multiple bus rapid transit lines.

== Precursors: Red Cars, Yellow Cars, and the "Hollywood Subway" (1901–1949) ==
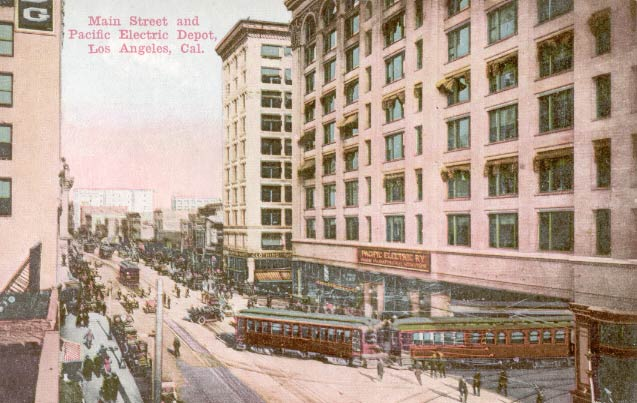
Red cars at the Pacific Electric Building, c. 1910

In the first half of the 20th century, Southern California had an extensive privately owned rail transit network with over 1,200 miles (1,900 km) of track at its peak, used by the interurban cars of the Pacific Electric ("Red Cars") and streetcars of the Los Angeles Railway ("Yellow Cars"). Many of these routes were constructed by real estate developers looking to lure people into their "streetcar suburbs".

=== Streetcar tunnels ===
In Downtown Los Angeles, train cars operated in the middle of city streets, and the introduction of cars on to lanes previously dedicated to pedestrians, horses, and public transit, created traffic jams. By 1917, city leaders started discussing the need for a system of subway tunnels for the Red Cars to use under and around downtown. Tunnels would connect Downtown in two directions: north to Glendale and Burbank, Hollywood, and the San Fernando Valley; and west to Vineyard Junction from where trains continued to Santa Monica on one line, and to Venice and Redondo Beach on the other. In 1923, the city proposed a large central subway station under Pershing Square, to be the hub of a system with tunnels to the north, west, south and east, thus removing all Red Cars (but not the intra-city Yellow Cars) from downtown streets. The proposed system was further worked out in a comprehensive transit plan by Kelker, DeLeuw & Co. commissioned by the city and county.

The northern tunnel was built and opened in 1925 as the "Hollywood Subway" (officially the Belmont Tunnel) through which the Glendale–Burbank, Hollywood and Valley Red Car lines ran. The Subway Terminal Building was built as its downtown terminus, and envisioned as the hub of a much more extensive subway system. The western tunnel or "Vineyard Subway" was never built, but in 1917, Arthur Letts and other business leaders formed a "Subway Rapid Transit Association" and spent $3.5 million ($88 million in 2025 adjusted for inflation) to buy a partial right-of-way for one through the Wilshire Center area. None of the other subway tunnels ever came to fruition.

=== The decline of streetcars ===
The 1920s brought two important changes to Southern California: private automobiles became more affordable and were being purchased en masse and the region saw enormous population growth. Ultimately these changes would doom the rail system, as the streetcars were slower and less convenient than private automobiles. As the systems started losing money, city leaders and voters directed public funding to improving automobile infrastructure, instead of the rail system.

During World War II (1941–1945), the system briefly returned to profitability due to gasoline rationing and troop movements, but after the war, ridership again quickly declined, especially as Southern California's freeway system started to be built out in the late 1940s.

Facing financial difficulties, the Los Angeles Railway was sold off to a subsidiary of National City Lines, a holding company that was purchasing transit systems across the country. National City Lines, which had major investments from Firestone Tire and Rubber Company, Standard Oil of California (now Chevron Corporation) and General Motors, began to dismantle the electric Yellow Car system, in favor of rubber-tired, diesel-powered buses (of which GM was a manufacturer) in what has become known as the General Motors streetcar conspiracy. In 1953, Pacific Electric passenger services were sold to another subsidiary of National City Lines.

== Government operation and monorails (1950–1969) ==
The Los Angeles Metropolitan Transit Authority (MTA), a government agency was formed in 1951 to conduct a feasibility study for a 45-mile (72 km) monorail line which would have connected Long Beach with the Panorama City district in the San Fernando Valley, including a two-mile (3.2 km) tunnel beneath Downtown Los Angeles. That report was delivered in 1954, and the agency's powers were expanded, authorizing it to study and propose an extensive regional transit system.

In 1957, another expansion of the MTA's powers authorized it to operate transit lines, and it subsequently purchased the bus and streetcar lines then being operated by Metropolitan Coach Lines, which had taken over passenger service of the Pacific Electric system in 1953, as well as the bus and streetcar lines of the Los Angeles Transit Lines, successor to the Los Angeles Railway. Both companies were acquired for $34 million (equivalent to $409 million in 2025). The MTA began operating the lines on March 3, 1958.

Despite the MTA's mission to create a regional transit system, the agency continued to abandon the old streetcar lines and replace them with bus service. The last former Pacific Electric line was abandoned in April 1961, and the last former Los Angeles Railway lines in 1963. However, Pacific Electric freight service ended on August 12, 1965. Also, the Santa Monica Air Line used diesel-powered freight service until March 11, 1988.

At the same time, across Southern California, privately owned bus companies were failing amid declining ridership; however, as part of the Great Society, on July 9th, 1964 President Lyndon Johnson signed the Urban Mass Transportation Act, offering federal funding of up to 2/3 of rail project costs. On August 18, 1964, the Southern California Rapid Transit District (RTD) was created from the merger of the MTA with eleven other failing bus companies and services in the Southern California region with an intention of pursuing the newly-available federal funding. As the name implied, the agency was also placed in charge of creating a rapid transit system for Southern California. The agency proposed building a 62-mile rail transit system across the county. The RTD brought the plan to voters, asking for a half-cent sales tax to fund the projects, but in 1968 it was voted down.

== Early planning for a rail revival (1970–1980) ==
With the shift from electric rail transit to private automobiles, air quality in the Los Angeles Basin declined precipitously from the 1940s to the 1960s, and left Los Angeles residents especially vulnerable to the gas price spikes in the 1970s.

These forces helped fuel a growing movement to build some sort of rapid transit system for the Los Angeles area, but the efforts would be slowed by the political realities of the region. Los Angeles County includes 88 cities in an enormous county (with its own powerful government), along with the state and federal government, all which had sometimes competing visions of what rapid transit should look like.

The RTD, under the leadership of Los Angeles Mayor Tom Bradley, came up with an ambitious proposal to get buy-in from all of the county: bus improvements across the region along with a sprawling system of 145 miles of rail transit. At the time, the Federal Urban Mass Transit Administration was offering cities up to 90% of federal funding for mass transit projects if they agreed to come up with a local match and operating funds. The RTD took a sales proposal to voters in 1974, but once again a proposed sales tax increase failed. Bradley would later say the proposal was a victim of "bad timing", an eight-day RTD bus driver strike crippled the county's transit system in 1974 and property tax bills arrived the weekend before the election.

The RTD did get one "win" in 1974: the El Monte Busway was opened, a bus-only lane (later converted to a high-occupancy vehicle lane).

After the defeat, the RTD and Bradley attempted to find existing sources of funding to build a less ambitious "starter line", an underground rapid transit line (also known as a subway) from Downtown to the west under Wilshire Boulevard. They saw this line as the "cornerstone" of any future system, due to population density of the Wilshire corridor, at the time the 5th most dense area in the nation.

The small Los Angeles-centric system frustrated the Los Angeles County Board of Supervisors, particularly Baxter Ward, who wanted to build a sprawling system of less expensive light rail lines across the county.

In 1976, the State of California formed the Los Angeles County Transportation Commission to coordinate the Southern California Rapid Transit District 's efforts with the area's municipal transit systems and take over planning of countywide transportation systems. The SCRTD planned for a heavy rail subway, while the Los Angeles County Transportation Commission (LACTC) developed plans for a light rail system.

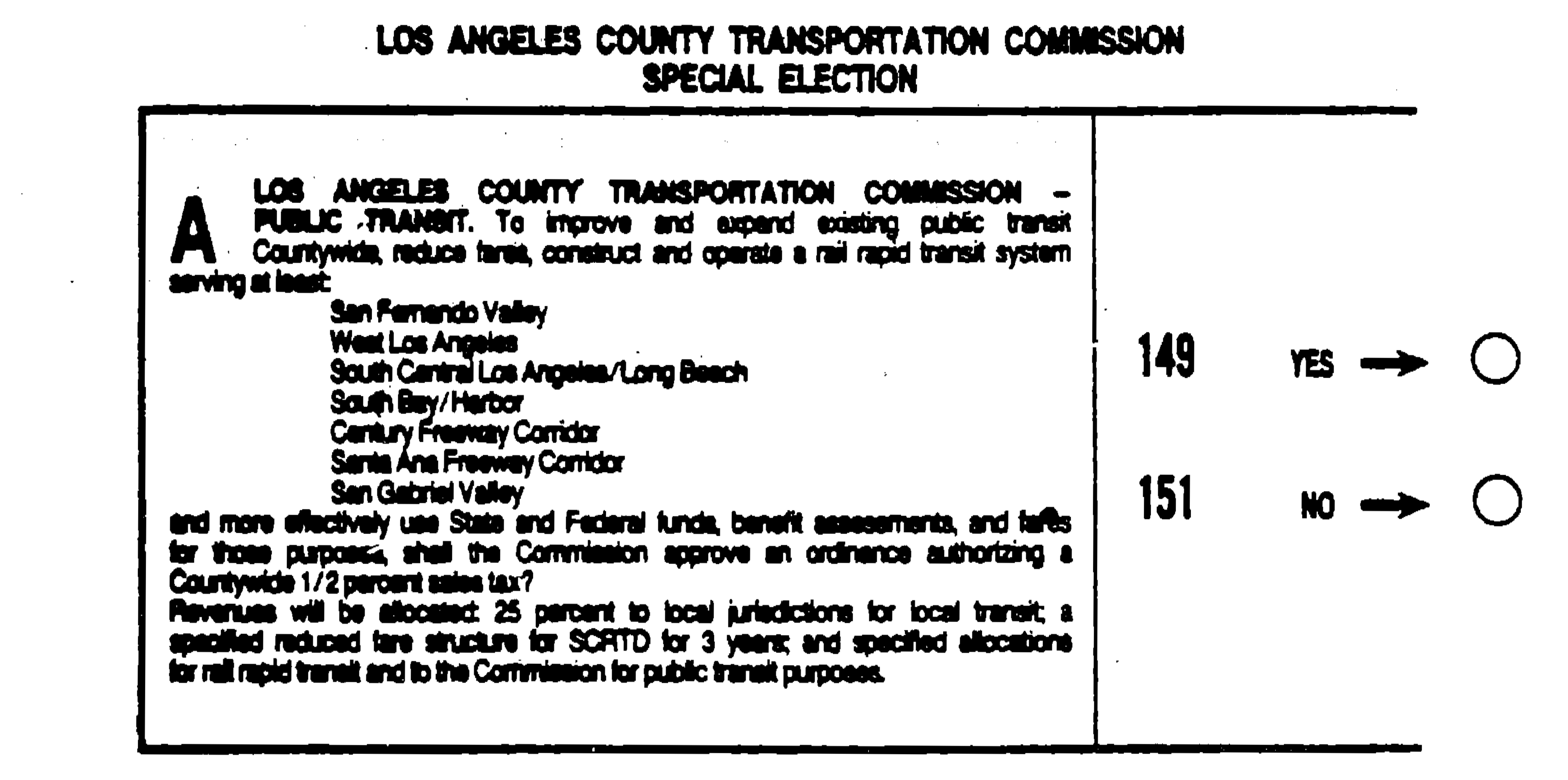
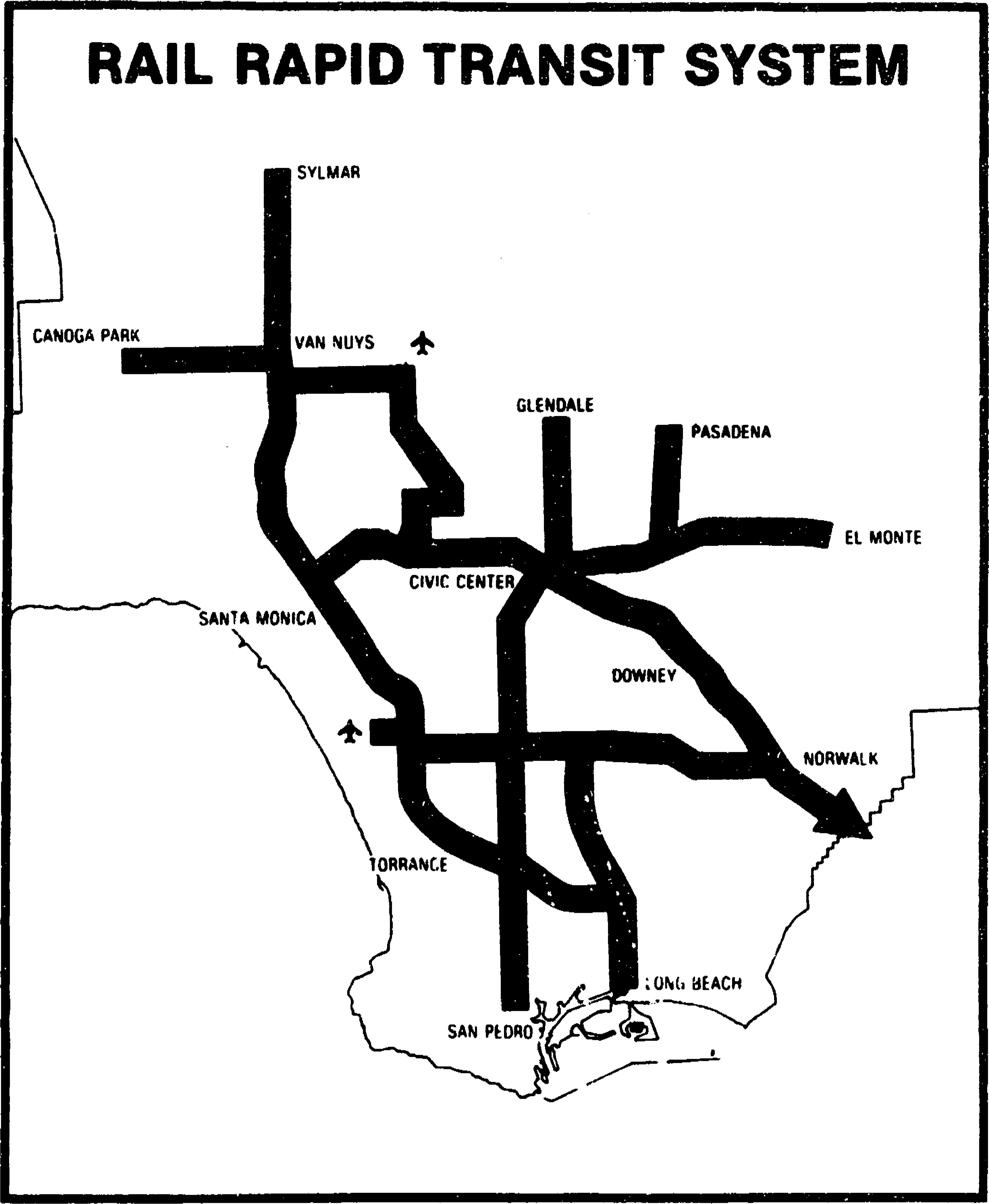
Wording of Proposition A and rail system map included in the official election pamphlet

In 1980 voters passed Proposition A, a half-cent sales tax for a regional transit system. Los Angeles County Supervisor Kenneth Hahn was the author of the proposition, declaring, "I'm going to put the trains back." The ballot named seven transit corridors:

1980 Ballot Corridor	Built as	Planned project
San Fernando Valley	Orange Line BRT	East San Fernando Valley Light Rail Transit Project
West Los Angeles	Purple Line	D Line Extension; Sepulveda Transit Corridor
South Central Los Angeles / Long Beach	Silver Line BRT (Harbor Transitway); Blue Line	
South Bay (Los Angeles County) / Harbor	Green Line	K Line Extension to Torrance
Century Freeway Corridor	Green Line	
Santa Ana Freeway Corridor		Southeast Gateway Line
San Gabriel Valley	Gold Line	

Caltrans surveyed the condition of former Pacific Electric lines in 1982.

This proposal envisioned a continuation of the Federal 90/10 match for transit construction. Unfortunately, 1980 also saw the election of the Reagan Administration, which pulled the plug on federal funding. President Reagan called Miami's metrorail a "boondoggle", leaving that city's transit system unfinished. Los Angeles would have to pull back from its initial proposal. The most glaring omission from the initial plan due to the pullback in federal support was and is the future Sepulveda line connecting the Valley to the Westside and eventually LAX and the South Bay. Funding was divided between RTD, which built heavy rail, and the LACTC, which focused on light rail along former Pacific Electric corridors.

== 1981–1990: Construction begins ==
The initial plan for the RTD's rapid transit line settled on a route that would travel west from Downtown Los Angeles along Wilshire Boulevard to Fairfax Avenue, then turn north along Fairfax to the San Fernando Valley. The route was controversial, with many residents and business owners in the Fairfax District publicly worried about gentrification, traffic congestion, and parking, but observers believed that the real fear revolved around minorities using the subway to travel into more affluent neighborhoods.

A methane explosion at a Ross Dress for Less clothing store at Fairfax and 3rd Street on March 24, 1985, gave Rep. Henry Waxman, who represented the Fairfax District, a reason to derail the project that was opposed by his constituents by prohibiting tunneling in an alleged "methane danger zone" along Wilshire. This zone stretched on either side of Wilshire Boulevard from Hancock Park to west of Fairfax (through areas of his district where subway opposition was strongest).

Congress passed the ban in 1986, but due in part to last-minute lobbying by RTD president Nick Patsaouras, a compromise was reached between Waxman and Rep. Julian Dixon. The deal allowed funding to go through as long as it did not fund construction that passed through the Wilshire corridor, although the compromise allowed a one-mile (1.6 km) stub on Wilshire between Vermont and Western.

The groundbreaking for the first minimum operating segment (MOS-1) of the subway was held on September 29, 1986, on the site of the future Civic Center/Grand Park station. Construction of the short 4.5-mile (7.2 km) starter line would cost US$1.43 billion (US$3.19 billion in 2025 dollars). The federal government covered 48 percent of the cost, with the remaining 52 percent coming from local and state sources, including the funding from Prop A.

Construction was challenging, with crews discovering artifacts under Union Station, 15.5 million year old fossils, and old fuel oil tanks, all which needed to be delicately removed before proceeding with tunnel boring machines. One of the most ambitious parts of the project involved building a cut-and-cover tunnel with a "pocket track" to store subway cars, under MacArthur Park, which involved completely draining the eight-acre MacArthur Park Lake.

With a Wilshire/Fairfax corridor alignment prohibited, a new route was chosen north up Vermont, the next-highest projected ridership corridor, to Hollywood.

The route north from Vermont Avenue was originally proposed to be elevated, and would have required the purchase and demolition of one or more of the hospitals located near the corner of Vermont and Sunset Boulevard, in order for trains to make the turn west onto Sunset continuing on elevated tracks, a major impact upon the community. In addition, the owners of TV and radio stations, and recording studios, further west along Sunset (at that time KTLA, KTTV and KCBS were among several broadcast and post-production facilities and music recording studios located along the stretch of Sunset Boulevard) proposed as the route. They strongly protested, claiming that the vibrations and noise from passing trains would interfere with their sensitive microphones and recording equipment. The SCRTD later proposed to put trains underground along Sunset to mollify the media owners' concerns, but those same business interests strongly maintained that even underground trains would create sufficient vibrations to negatively impact their facilities, and vowed to file suit to prevent any rail line along their stretch of Sunset Boulevard.

By then, new rounds of Federal money were available, and then-SCRTD CEO, Allen Pegg, announced that the transit agency was very confident that sufficient funding for an entirely underground line, now proposed to travel under Hollywood Boulevard to avoid conflicts with the studios on Sunset, could be secured. The line would then turn north along Highland Avenue to Universal City and North Hollywood. A stop at Hollywood Bowl was determined not to have enough year-round ridership to meet FTA formulas for Federal funding, just one of the reasons for not building a station there. The FTA approved the all-underground route, turning from Vermont onto Hollywood Boulevard and then subsequently under the Cahuenga Pass towards North Hollywood, and funding was broken into two phases in order to spread the cost over time, making it more likely to be approved by Federal Congress.

Building awareness of the new Metro Red Line required a massive public relations and advertising campaign. Several agencies were awarded contracts to supply information, create signage and billboards, and produce radio, newspaper and television advertising. Coronado Communications, in alliance with sub-contractor Pangea Corporation, worked out a creative strategy to communicate to the Latino, Korean and Chinese communities. Under the direction of Coronado Communications' Fernando Oaxaca and Pangea's Cheryl Ann Wong, the campaign reached the target audience months before the Metro opened by utilizing traditional media and hosting special minority community events.

== 1990–1991: The Blue Line ==
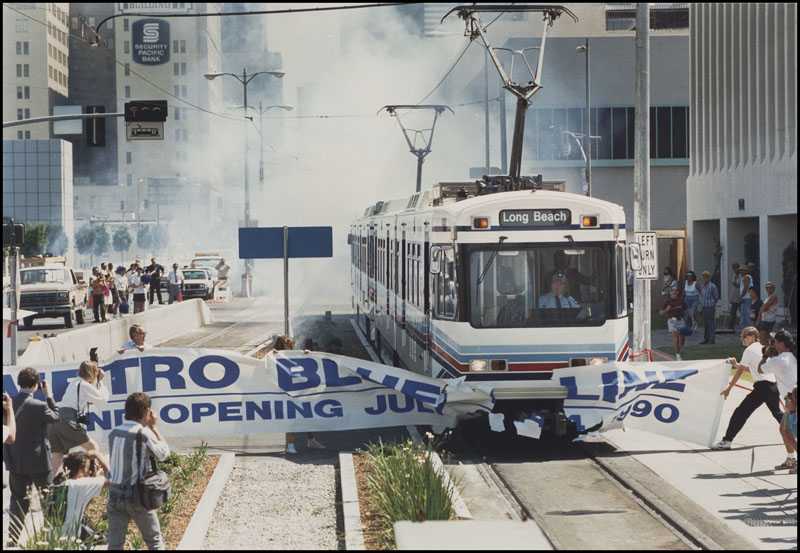
LA Metro Blue Line (now A Line) opening celebration on July 14, 1990

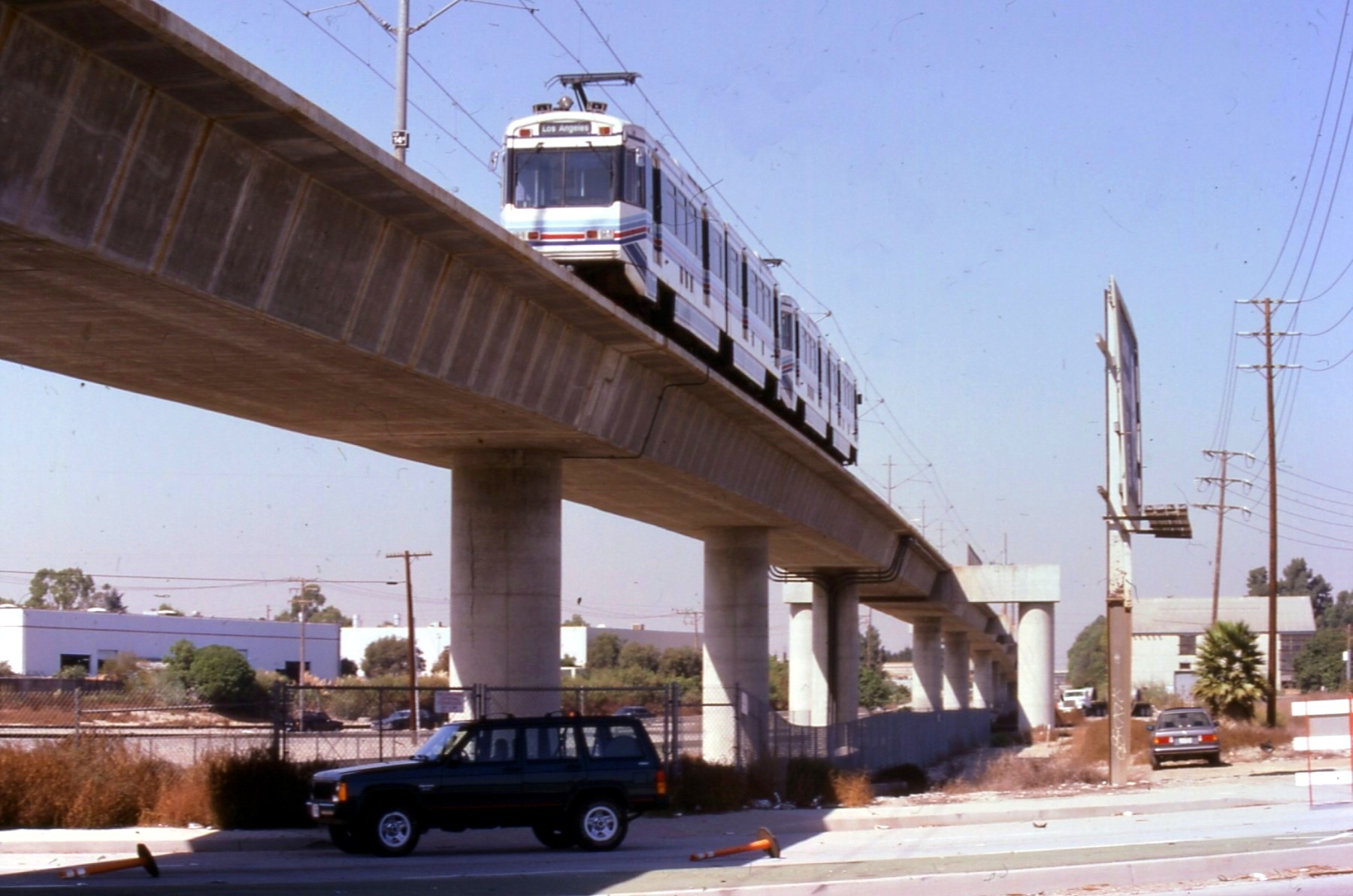
The Blue Line overpass of Santa Fe Avenue in Compton, October 1995

As plans for the subway line were underway, two intersecting light rail lines were also under construction: One largely along disused north-south Pacific Electric right-of-way through South Los Angeles, and, beginning in 1987, another built in conjunction with the new east–west Century Freeway. The freeway had been planned—and fiercely opposed—for more than a decade. As part of the consent decree signed by Caltrans in 1972 to allow construction, provisions were made for a transit corridor (without designating the type) in the freeway's median. In the original Metro Rail master plan of the early 1980s, this corridor was designated as a light rail line. Though Mayor Tom Bradley and other politicians intended this east–west line to be fully automated, the technology was not fully implemented, and the two light rail lines ended up sharing common rolling stock.

In 1988, the SCRTD and the LACTC formed a third entity under which all rail construction would be consolidated.

While the subway was a highly anticipated project, the LACTC's light rail Blue Line (later renamed the A Line in 2019) became the first local rail transit line in Los Angeles since the closure of the last Pacific Electric line in 1961. It was first opened to the public on July 14, 1990, running largely along an abandoned Pacific Electric right-of-way. The initial light rail segment cost US$877 million ($2.16 billion in 2025 adjusted for inflation). Design and construction was managed by the Rail Construction Corporation, now a subsidiary of Metro.

The initial segment was largely at-grade, running between Pico station in Downtown Los Angeles to Anaheim Street station in Long Beach. A loop through downtown Long Beach opened on September 1, 1990. On February 14, 1991, the line was extended further to its (until 2023) northern terminus at the 7th Street/Metro Center station. In 1993, the 7th St/Metro Center station would become a transfer station, allowing riders to connect with the heavy rail subway Red Line.

The route was a success, and from 1999 to 2001, the Blue Line underwent an US$11 million project to lengthen 19 of its platforms so that they could accommodate three-car trains. Plans were also made to extend the Blue Line north to Pasadena, but the connection across downtown was deferred, and the northern portion opened as the Gold Line in 2003.

== 1993: The Red Line opens ==
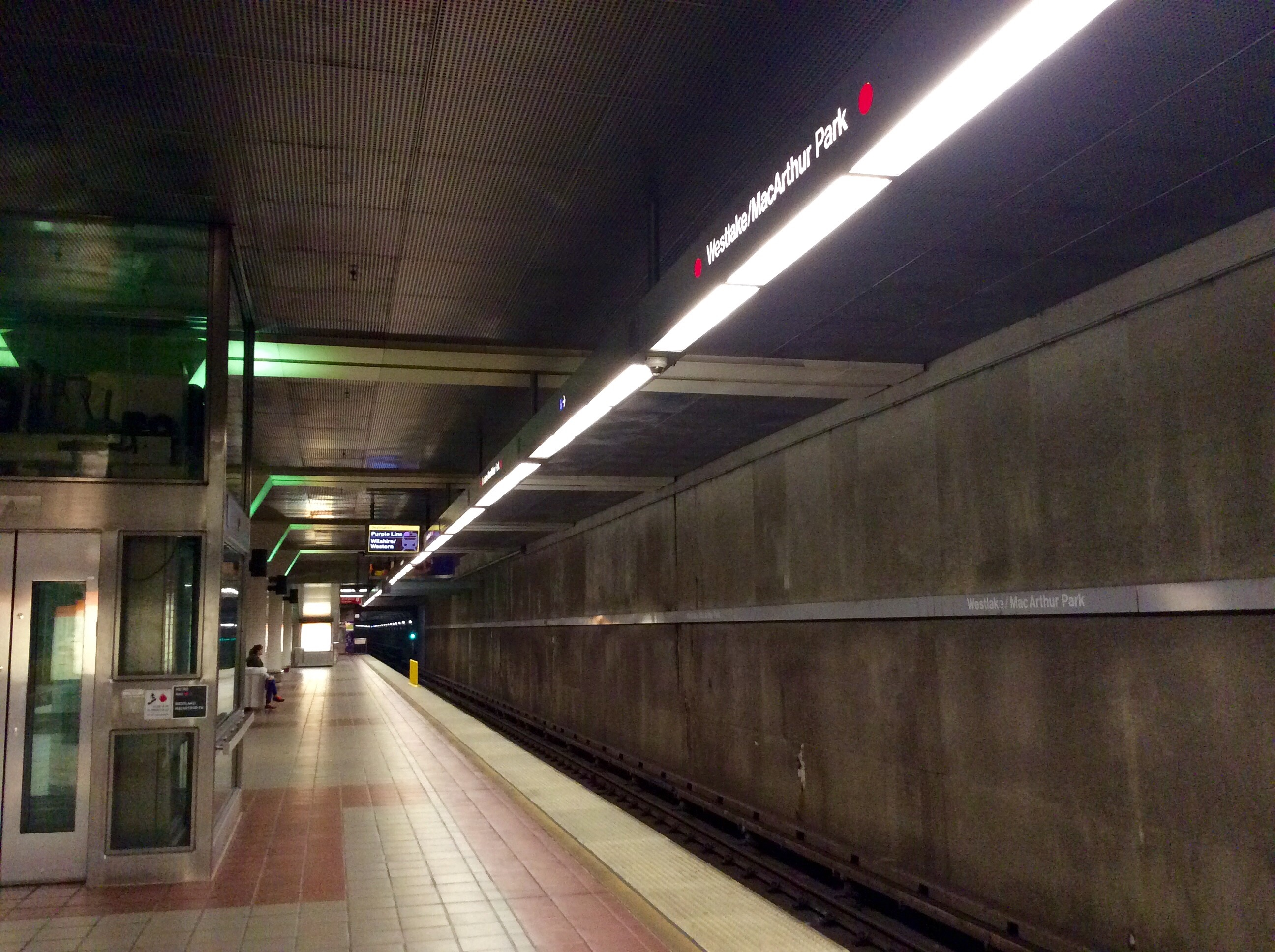
Westlake/MacArthur Park station, temporary outbound terminus of the Red Line upon opening in 1993.

In 1993, the SCRTD and the LACTC were merged into the Los Angeles County Metropolitan Transportation Authority (LACMTA), now branded as Metro. That year, the new agency finally opened its underground subway, dubbed the Red Line. The first segment was designated MOS-1, consisted of five stations from Union Station to Westlake/MacArthur Park, and opened on January 30, 1993.

Ridership on the short line was slow at first, basically serving as a lunch-time shuttle for downtown workers, and connecting them with Metrolink trains at the beginning and end of the work day. Over time, the line, along with the Walt Disney Concert Hall and Staples Center at either end of downtown, helped transform the area, which was then thought of as a daytime work destination that one avoided at night, into a "live, work and play" area that continues to draw new residents, cultural venues and entertainment centers.

== 1995: The Green Line opens ==
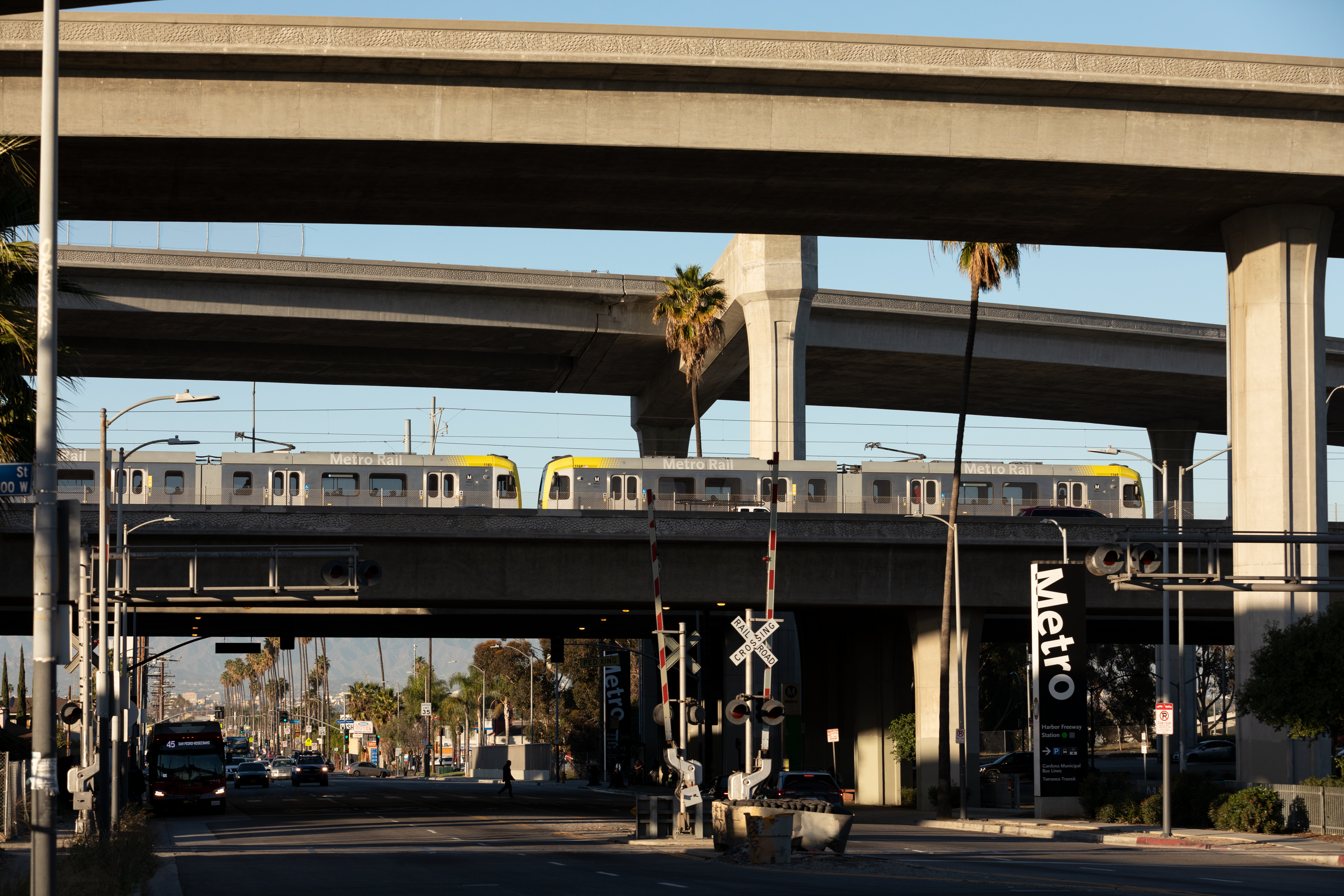
Metro Green Line (now C Line) train running in the median of I-105.

The line along I-105, designated the Green Line, began service in 1995 at the cost $718 million ($1.52 billion in 2025 adjusted for inflation). One of its purposes when plans for it were drawn up in the 1980s was to serve the aerospace and defense industries in the El Segundo area. But by 1995, the Cold War was over, and the aerospace sector was hemorrhaging jobs. Furthermore, during the 1980s, the bedroom communities in the Gateway Cities region of southeastern Los Angeles County were rapidly losing their population of middle-class aerospace workers (primarily whites and blacks), a process that radically accelerated in the early 1990s. The working-class and poor Hispanics who filled the vacuum generally had no connection to the aerospace sector. This rationale for Green Line construction was a principal argument cited by the Bus Riders Union when it contended that the MTA was focusing its efforts on serving middle-class whites and not working-class minorities. As a result, ridership has been below projected estimates.

The Green Line was designed to be fully grade separated in order to allow fully automated driverless train control, leading to low operating costs that could justify the line's relatively low projected ridership. As such, the El Segundo section running along the Harbor Subdivision freight rail corridor was built on viaducts rather than at-grade. Although driverless technology was safe and proven, the line opened with driver-controlled trains. The opportunity to construct the Green Line in tandem with the Century Freeway meant prioritizing the project over others that would have higher ridership, and the pullback from the initial plan to use the Harbor Subdivision as the right of way that would connect all the way up to the San Fernando Valley as a heavy rail corridor paralleling Interstate 405 – now the future Sepulveda line – meant the Harbor Subdivision would be built out for passenger service as light rail. The City of Norwalk also sued to stop the construction of the Century Freeway beyond Interstate 605, meaning the Green Line was never extended to the Metrolink Santa Fe Springs station, as initially planned.

The Green Line's western alignment was originally planned and partially constructed to connect with LAX, but the airport was planning a major renovation during the line's construction. Los Angeles World Airports wanted the connection to LAX to be integrated with this construction, but there were concerns from the Federal Aviation Administration that the overhead lines of the rail line would interfere with the landing paths of airplanes. In addition, citizens of neighboring communities to LAX opposed the expansion of the airport. Taxi and limousine drivers and owners of parking lots surrounding LAX feared that a train operating to LAX would create competition, as there is ample free parking at numerous points along the Green Line. As a compromise, a free shuttle from Aviation/Imperial station transported riders to LAX terminals. Today, passengers on the C Line can now ride directly to the new LAX/Metro Transit Center, a transfer station to the future SkyLink.

One of the lessons learned from the line, and the Harbor Transitway built at the same time, was that freeway median stations offer a poor rider experience, requiring customers to descend from bridges or climb stairs from dimly lit underpasses to isolated stations in the middle of a noisy and exhaust-ridden freeway.

== 1996–2000: The Red Line is completed ==
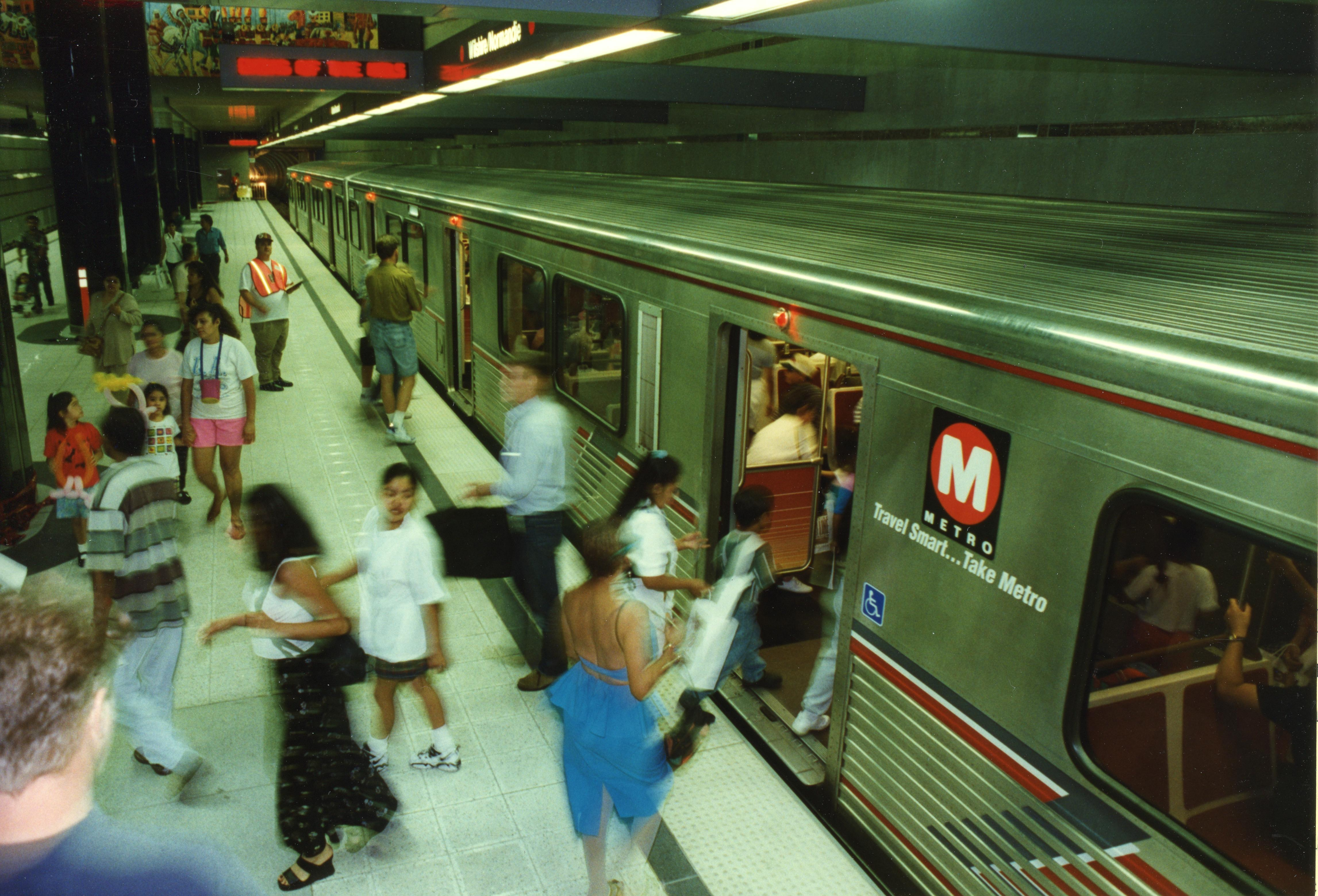
Opening day of the Metro extension to Wilshire (July 1996) at the Wilshire/Normandie station

=== Construction progress and issues ===
As construction on the Red Line subway continued in 1995, a sinkhole appeared on Hollywood Boulevard, barely missing several workers and causing damage to buildings on the street. Subway construction was halted until the situation could be resolved. The contractor, Shea-Kiewit-Kenny, was replaced with a new contractor, Tutor Saliba.

MOS-2 opened in two segments. Three new stations between Westlake/MacArthur Park and Wilshire/Western opened in 1996; and five new stations from Wilshire/Vermont to Hollywood/Vine opened in 1999. At this point the Red Line operated in two branches, with shared service between MacArthur Park and Union Station; the branch to Wilshire/Western was eventually designated as the "Purple Line" in 2006, and in 2019, as the D Line, with the North Hollywood Red Line branch redesignated as the B Line.

MOS-3, which added new stations and extended the Red Line from Hollywood/Vine to its current terminus at North Hollywood, opened in 2000. Litigation over an illegally awarded contract to build the Hollywood/Highland station and tunnels took more time to resolve than the actual construction.

During construction, 2,000 fossils were discovered, including 64 extinct species of fish, the tusk of an Ice Age elephant and the bones of an ancient longhorn bison, a report funded by the MTA found. The report was authored by paleontologist Bruce Lander of Paleo Environmental Associates in Irvine. Lander worked with a team of 28 scientists during construction of the Metro Rail Red Line. Fossil evidence showed that tens of thousands of years ago, ground sloths, horses, elephants and camels roamed among redwood trees in what is now Los Angeles, according to an MTA summary of the 300-page report. The scientists also found evidence of a great flood in the San Fernando Valley 9,000 years ago that swept away trees. Among the 64 extinct species of marine fish 39 had never before been discovered, the report said. The scientists found bones of an American mastodon, a western camel and a Harlan's ground sloth. They found wood and pollen of land plants including incense cedar and coast redwood trees, and bones of birds, shrews, cottontail rabbits, gophers, mice and kangaroo rats. Some of the fossils are as much as 16.5 million years old.

=== Proposition A ===
In 1998, in part in response to the perceived mismanagement of Red Line construction, Los Angeles County Supervisor Zev Yaroslavsky sponsored Los Angeles County Proposition A, the MTA Reform and Accountability Act of 1998, to ban the use of Los Angeles County revenue from existing sales taxes for subway tunneling, which voters approved. Yaroslavsky stated that local money could be used to cover subway-related costs, as long as it was not used directly for tunneling.

During construction there were allegations of corruption and safety issues, including cost overruns and tunnel walls having thicknesses less than specified or required by law.

== 2003: The Gold Line opens to Pasadena ==
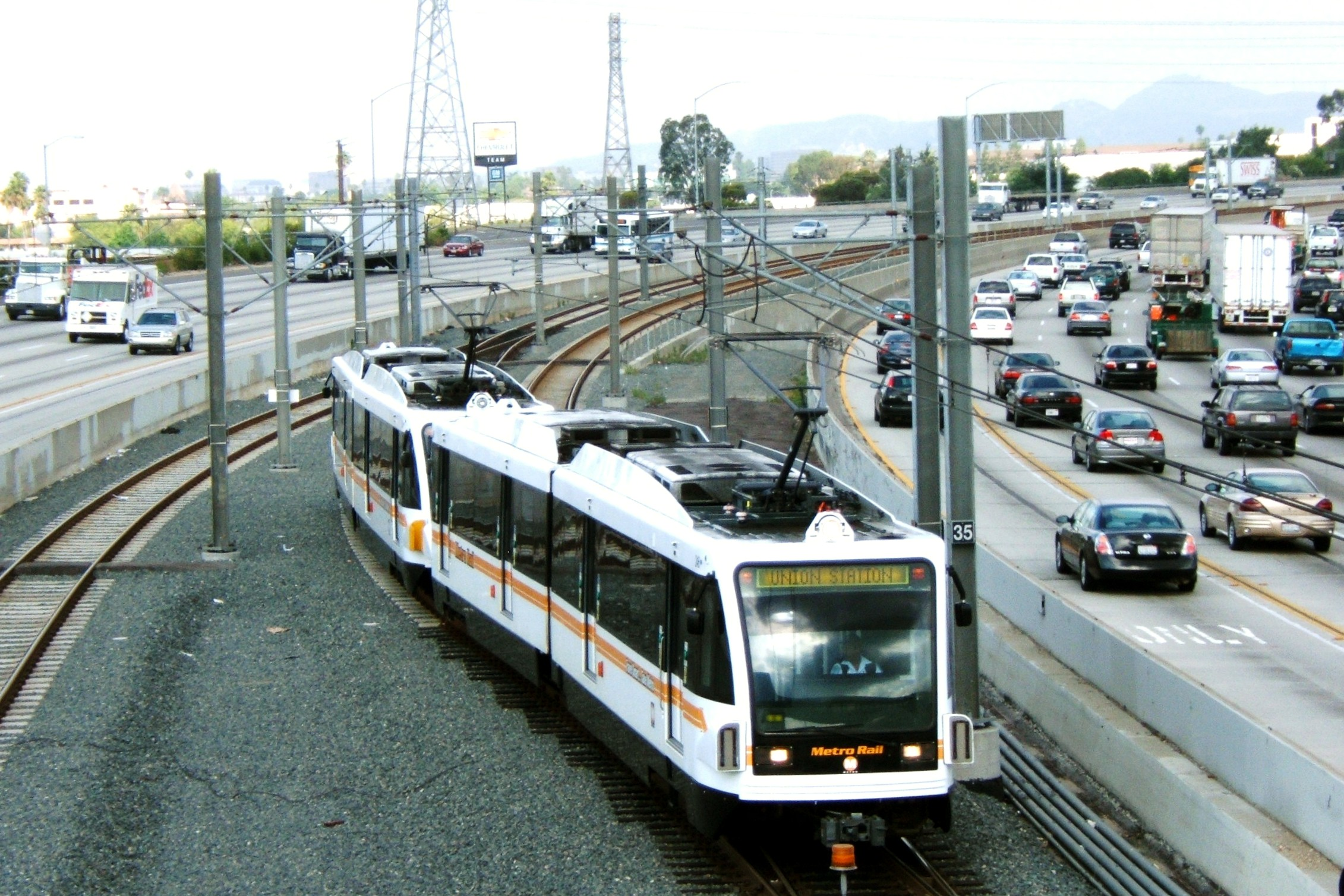
A Siemens P2000 train at Sierra Madre Villa station, 2005

Meanwhile, plans had been underway for some time for rail transit connecting Downtown Los Angeles with Pasadena and the San Gabriel Valley. The initial route largely followed the former right-of-way of the Atchison, Topeka and Santa Fe Railway (the Pasadena Subdivision), along which inter-city passenger trains like the Southwest Chief and the Desert Wind had operated until Amtrak service was re-routed along the Southern Transcon to San Bernardino via Fullerton in the early 1990s.

Initial plans were to tunnel the Blue Line north and east from its terminus at 7th Street/Metro Center through Downtown Los Angeles to Union Station, from where it would continue onward to Pasadena. But with the project only around 11% complete, the 1998 passage of the ballot measure banning the use of sales tax revenue for subway tunnelling denied Metro the funding necessary for the underground portion of the project.

Congressman Adam Schiff subsequently authored a bill that created a separate authority to continue work on the mostly above-ground section connecting Union Station to Pasadena, and construction began again in 2000. The first segment, dubbed the Gold Line, opened between Union Station and Sierra Madre Villa on July 26, 2003.

The Gold Line implemented limited stop service in 2006 and 2007, but this was eventually replaced by overall speed improvements in 2007. A noise barrier was constructed along the route in South Pasadena between the Mission and Fillmore stations to address noise complaints from South Pasadena residents between April 2007 and July 2007 during track construction.

== 2005: Orange Line opens ==
=== Early transit proposals ===
In 1991, Metro acquired the former Southern Pacific Railroad Burbank Branch railbed through the San Fernando Valley. This line had seen passenger rail service from 1904 to 1920, with stations at several locations, including North Hollywood and Van Nuys, and Pacific Electric Red Car service from North Hollywood to Van Nuys again from 1938 to 1952. Transit planners envisioned an extension of the Metro Red Line subway as the most natural use for the corridor because the purchased right-of-way began at North Hollywood station.

L.A. Mayor Richard Riordan suggested converting the right of way to an open trench — "Some way to get it out of the ground" — to save costs compared to the use of deep-burrow tunnel boring machines (TBM) while still addressing neighborhood objections to an elevated line. However, local community groups fiercely opposed such alternatives and, in fact, any rail construction that was not completely underground. In particular, the local Orthodox Jewish community, which the line would bisect, resisted an above-ground line; because Shabbat prohibits driving or using electricity from sundown Friday through Saturday, those travelling to synagogue are compelled to walk and, while not backed by any studies, local community leaders claimed they would be exposed to greater potential danger by crossing the line on foot, especially at night. Groups were organized and funded by the community to oppose anything but a subway.

In response, California state Senator Alan Robbins introduced legislation which prohibited the use of the corridor for "any form of rail transit other than a deep bore subway located at least 25 feet below ground." The legislation was passed in 1991 during what was called "the days of LA anti-rail zealotry". (The law would eventually be repealed in 2014.)

However, the passage of Proposition A in 1998 also cut off funding for a potential subway line in the corridor. With both subway and light rail now legally prohibited, but with growing political pressure to use the former railbed for "something", the last available option was a busway. This proposal was also opposed by neighborhood groups; however, since it was not prohibited by Robbins's law, it moved forward.

=== Construction ===
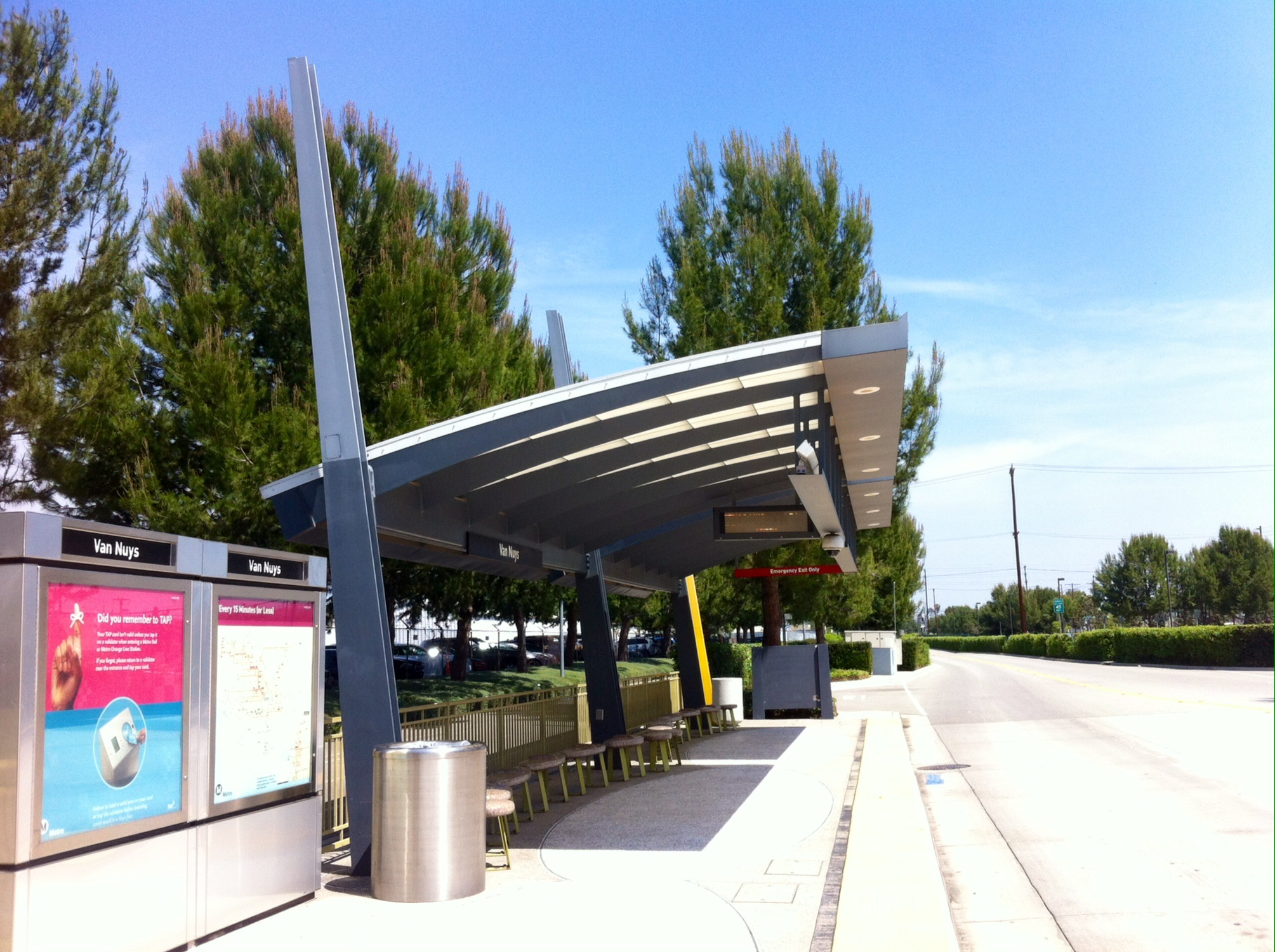
The Orange Line (now the G Line) operates in a dedicated right of way formerly used as a railroad with stops similar to light rail stations.

Construction began on the bus rapid transit line in September 2002. During construction, the contractor experienced several delays: a dead body was found tucked in a barrel along the alignment, and toxic soil had to be removed. In July 2004, an appeal by a local citizens' group known as C.O.S.T. (Citizens Organized for Smart Transit) was successful in convincing the California Courts of Appeal to order a temporary halt to construction, claiming a network of Metro Rapid bus lines should have been studied as a possible alternative to the Metro Orange Line. The legal maneuver did not stop the project, but the 30-day delay cost taxpayers about $70,000 per day ($2.1 million total) to hold workers and equipment while the matter was resolved. The lawsuit was eventually thrown out of court by Los Angeles County Superior Court Judge David P. Yaffe, who also ordered C.O.S.T. members to pay $37,415.81 ($65,484 in 2025 adjusted for inflation) to the MTA for document-preparation work related to the case.

=== Opening and later changes ===
The route was eventually designated the Orange Line, after the citrus groves in the area. It was listed on Metro Rail system maps and mirrored its "honor system", with riders expected to have bought a ticket; there was no ticket validation or fare collection box on board. The route opened on October 29, 2005, between North Hollywood and Warner Center, at a final cost of $324 million ($23 million per mile) ($534 million and $37.9 million in 2025 adjusted for inflation). Within two years, capacity demands led to Metro deploying a 65-foot (20 m) bus. The agency had to receive a special waiver from Caltrans to operate the bus for testing purposes, since current state law only allows the operation of buses 60 feet (18 m) or shorter. 65-foot (20 m) buses have a seating capacity of 66 passengers and can accommodate 100 passengers.

== 2008: Measure R ==
In the 2008 election, Los Angeles County voters approved Measure R with 67.22% of the vote, just over the two-thirds majority required by the state of California to raise local taxes. The initiative provided sales tax revenue for transportation projects, including subway tunnelling, and will result in the construction or expansion of a dozen rail lines in the county.

== 2009: Gold Line Eastside Extension ==
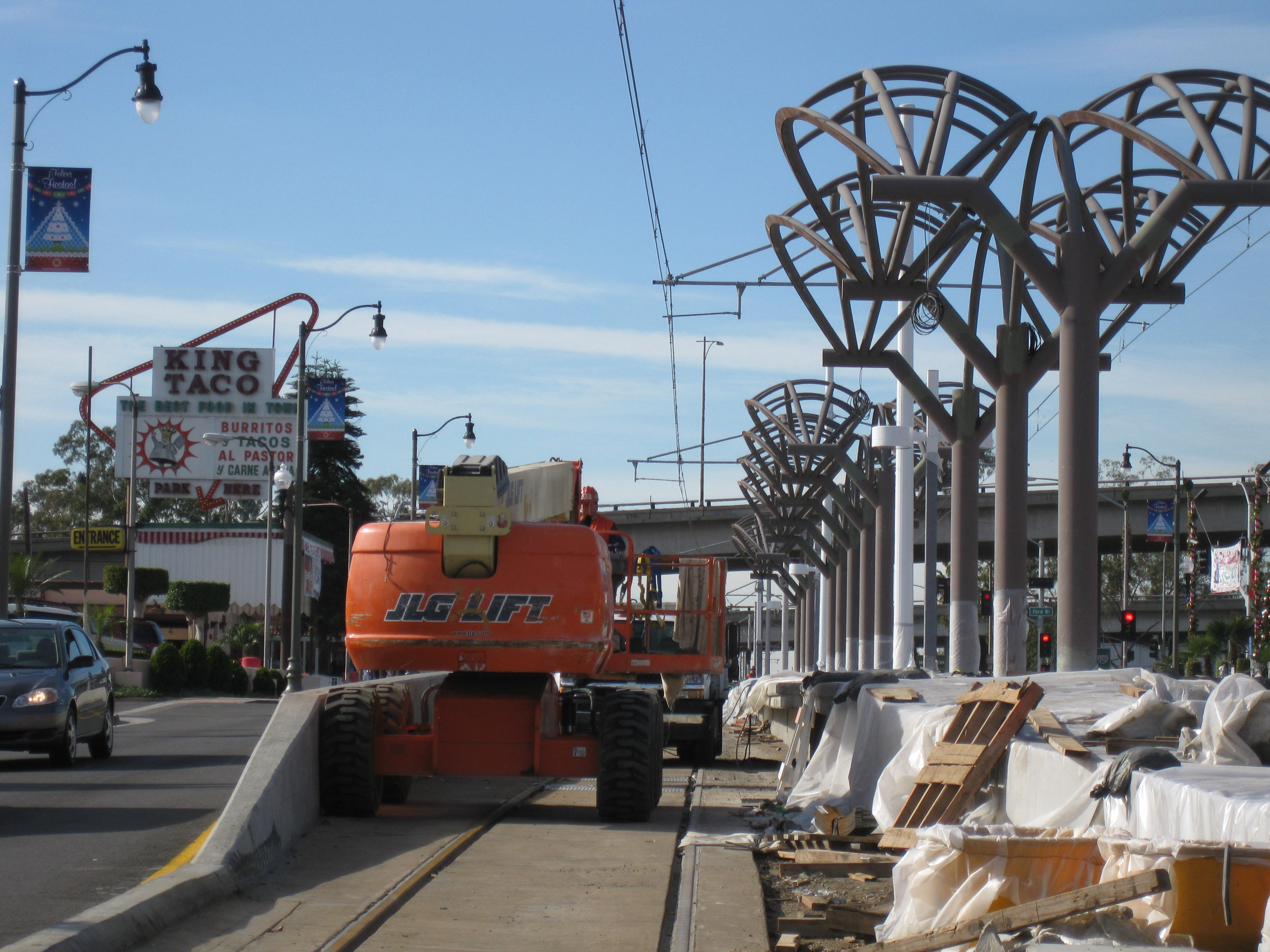
Gold Line Maravilla station under construction in December 2008

On November 15, 2009, Metro opened the first phase of the Gold Line Eastside Extension. The project extended the Gold Line from Union Station to Atlantic Boulevard near Monterey Park. The extended route serves Little Tokyo, Arts District, Boyle Heights and East Los Angeles. The project added eight stations, two of which (Mariachi Plaza and Soto) are underground stations, only the second set of subway stations in the light rail portion of the Metro Rail system (after the 7th Street/Metro Center station).

== 2009: Freeway busways become the Silver Line ==
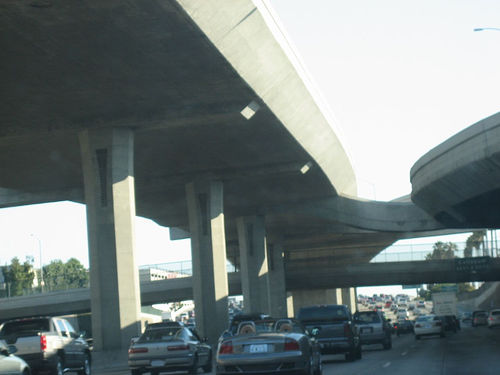
This elevated section of the Harbor Transitway carries the Metro Silver Line and the Metro ExpressLanes over the frequently congested Harbor Freeway.

=== Original busways ===
Express bus service along the San Bernardino Freeway has been provided by the El Monte Busway since 1973. In the 1990s, a similar facility, the Harbor Transitway, was built along the Harbor Freeway. In 1993, Metro's Scheduling and Operations Planning department issued a report on what it called a "Dual Hub High Occupancy Vehicle Transitway". The report suggested that when the Harbor Transitway opened in 1995, it should be served by a "high speed, high capacity service" that would also serve the El Monte Busway. Existing express routes that traveled on the two facilities would be truncated to end at one of two hubs (El Monte station and the Harbor Gateway Transit Center) where passengers would transfer to a bus that would take them the rest of the way to Downtown LA.

In the end, Metro decided to adopt another proposal in the report, increasing service on the existing Harbor Freeway express lines and operating each as independent routes. Because most of the freeway express buses traveling on the El Monte Busway and Harbor Transitway served the needs of commuters, service was frequent along the corridors during the weekday peak hours, but infrequent during other times.

When the Harbor Transitway opened in 1995 it was seen as a white elephant. The route stopped a mile short of Downtown LA and the stations, being close to freeway traffic, were criticized as being noisy, polluted and appeared uninviting. Planners had projected that 65,200 passengers would travel along the Harbor Transitway each day, but after 10 years ridership fell far below those predictions, with the route seeing just 3,000 passengers per weekday in 2004. Starting in the early 2000s Metro tried to increase ridership on the two corridors by branding them as a part of the burgeoning Metro Rail system. The El Monte Busway was added to maps using a silver color, while the Harbor Transitway was added in bronze.

=== Silver Streak ===
In 2007, Foothill Transit introduced the Silver Streak as a "single hub" service along the El Monte busway. Several Foothill Transit routes were truncated at El Monte station and passengers transferred to frequent, high capacity Silver Streak buses. The line was deemed a success.

In 2008, Metro once again looked at the concept of linking the El Monte Busway and the Harbor Transitway with a "Dual Hub Bus Rapid Transit" route. After several months of study the Metro voted to introduce the service as the Silver Line in summer 2009. Five Metro Express lines were truncated to terminate at either Harbor Gateway Transit Center or the El Monte station, where passengers would transfer to the Silver Line to continue into Downtown Los Angeles.

Metro also studied drastically changing the fare structure on the route. Previously, passengers on freeway express routes would pay zone fares up to $3.95 based on distance travelled. To encourage ridership, Metro looked into charging the same flat base fare ($1.50 at the time) used on Metro Rail, the Metro Orange Line, and Metro Local routes. The plan encountered heavy opposition from Foothill Transit who worried the low fares would reduce ridership on its more expensive Silver Streak service. In the end Metro set a flat-rate fare of $2.45, which was more than the base fare used on the rest of the system, but 30¢ cheaper than the Silver Streak. The fare fight delayed the opening of the Silver Line several months.

=== Opening and later changes ===
The line eventually opened in December 2009 and carried 6,200 passengers a day during the first month, similar to the combined ridership of the express routes the Silver Line replaced. Service operated half-hourly during the mid-day hours and hourly at night and on weekends. Over the next two years, ridership steadily increased to 11,000 daily passengers in October 2011. Encouraged by the results Metro continued to improve headways, operating buses every 15 minutes during the mid-day hours and every 40 minutes on Saturday.

== 2012: Expo Line Initial Segment ==
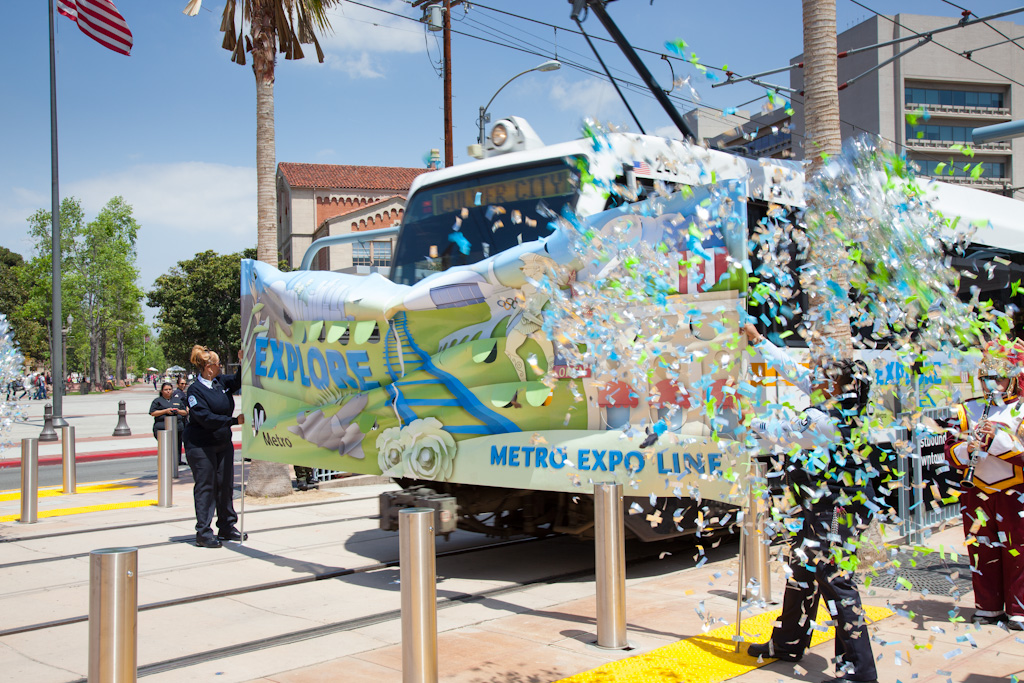
Expo Line Initial Operating Segment Opening Celebration, April 27, 2012

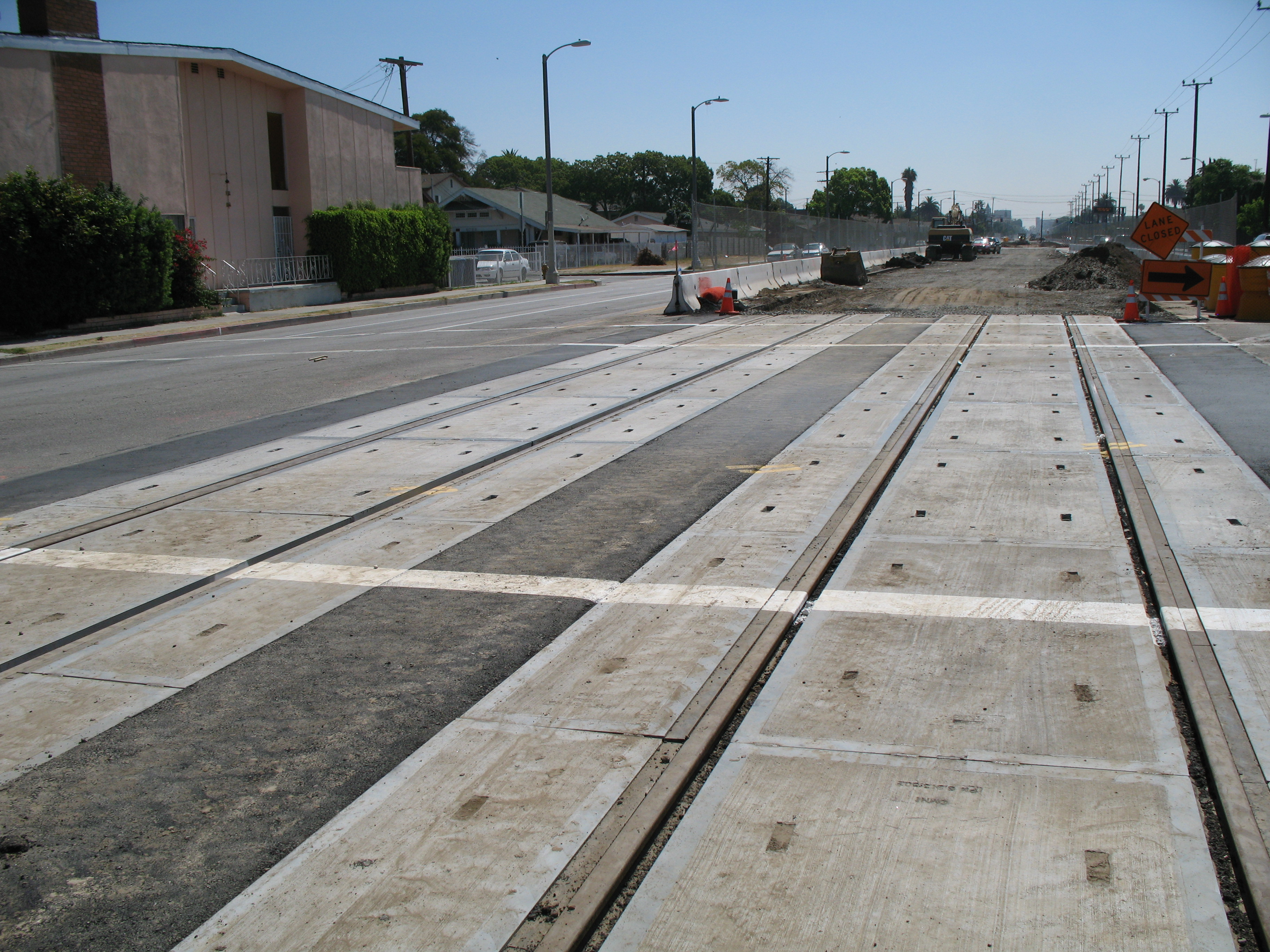
Tracks being laid for the Expo Line, June 2008

The next Metro Rail line built followed the right-of-way first opened in 1875 as the steam-powered Los Angeles and Independence Railroad to bring mining ore to ships in Santa Monica harbor and as a passenger excursion train to the beach—first independently and later after purchase by the Southern Pacific Railroad in 1877. When the Santa Monica harbor closed to shipping traffic in 1909 the line was leased to Pacific Electric, which converted it to electric traction. By 1920 the line was called the Santa Monica Air Line, providing electric-powered freight and passenger service between Los Angeles and Santa Monica. Electrically powered passenger service stopped in 1953 but diesel-powered freight deliveries to warehouses along the route continued until March 11, 1988.

While Southern Pacific maintained ownership of the right-of-way, after 1988 it no longer used or maintained the rails. Portions of the right-of-way were leased for use as storage facilities, parking lots, impound lots, and various businesses, but no permanent structures were built. The abandonment of the line spurred concerns within the community to prevent the line from being sold off piecemeal—destroying one of the few remaining intact rail corridors within Los Angeles County. Advocacy groups including Friends 4 Expo Transit supported the successful passage of Proposition C in 1990, which allowed the purchase of the entire right-of-way from Southern Pacific by Metro (LACTC).

In 1998, Metro successfully lobbied the federal government to use funding that had been allocated for but not spent on the Red Line for a project along the Expo right-of-way project to the Mid City district of Los Angeles. Metro then released a Major Investment Study in 2000 which compared bus rapid transit and light rail transit options along what was now known as the "Mid-City/Exposition Corridor". Construction began in mid-2006. The line was originally dubbed the "Aqua Line"; later it was redesignated the "Expo Line", though the line retained the aqua color.

An independent agency, the Exposition Metro Line Construction Authority, was given the authority to plan, design, and construct the line by state law in 2003. The first phase comprised the 8.6-mile (13.8 km) section between Downtown Los Angeles and Culver City. Construction began in early 2006 and most stations opened to the public on April 28, 2012. Culver City station opened on June 20, 2012, in conjunction with the infill Farmdale station between Expo/La Brea station and Expo/Crenshaw station.

== 2012: Orange Line Chatsworth Extension ==
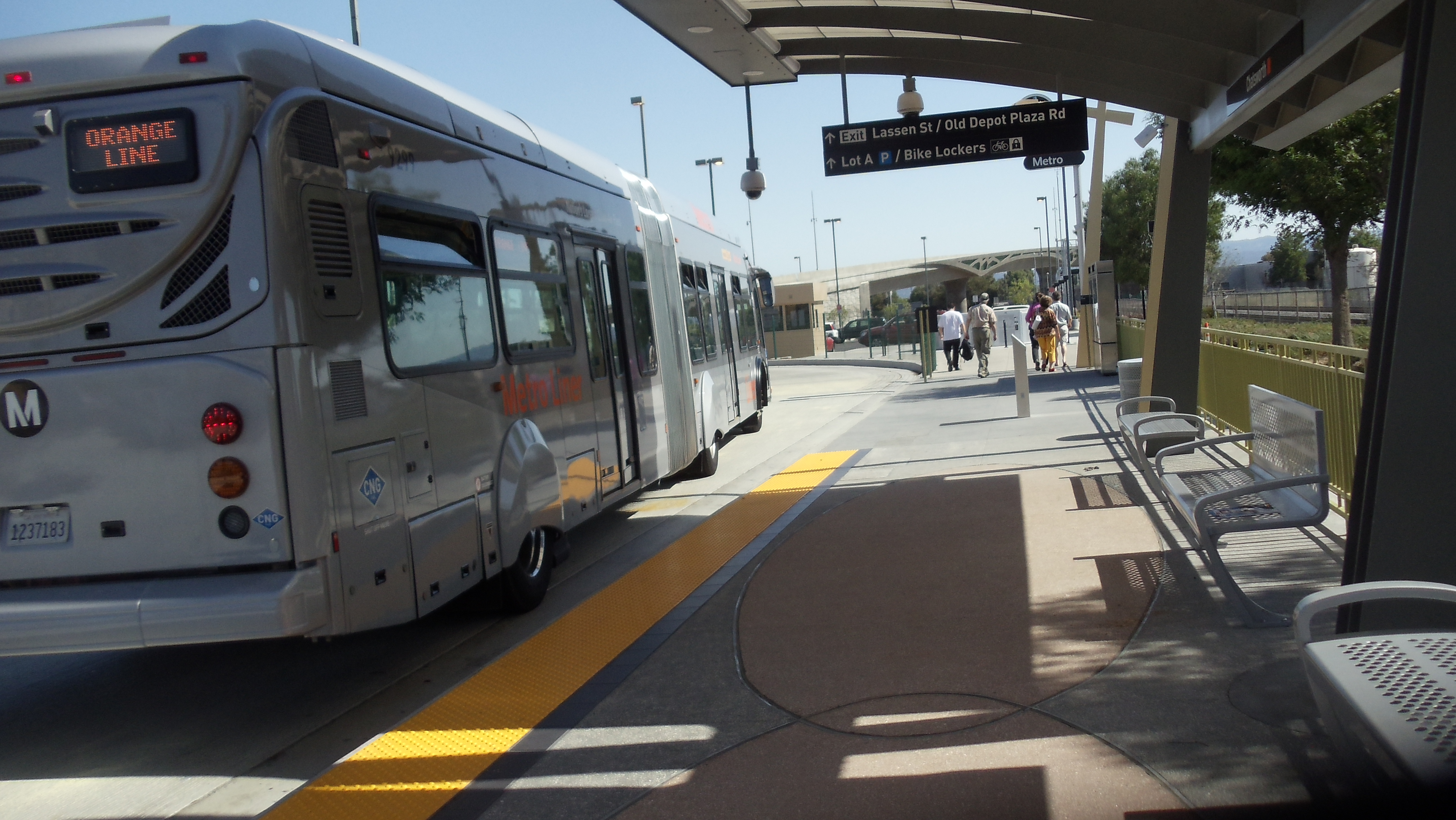
Metro Orange Line at Chatsworth Metro Orange Line Station. The 4-mile extension from Canoga Station to Chatsworth opened June 30, 2012.

On June 23, 2009, construction began on a four-mile (6.4 km) extension of the Orange Line busway from Canoga northward to the Metrolink station in Chatsworth. Metro's board approved the plan on September 28, 2006, and it was completed in 2012 at a cost of $215 million ($302 million in 2025 adjusted for inflation). This continues to follow the abandoned SP Burbank Branch roadbed. Revenue service opened on June 30, 2012.

When the Chatsworth extension of the Metro Orange Line opened on June 30, 2012, several different service patterns used the busway network, including a peak-hour shuttle between Chatsworth and Warner Center. To provide service on these shuttles, several NABI 45-foot (14 m) Compo buses were assigned to the Metro Orange Line. In 2018, Warner Center, which was the only stop on the line outside the dedicated busway, was removed from the Orange Line, with a frequent local shuttle service connecting it to Canoga; subsequently Orange Line buses only travelled along the busway, with alternate short turn buses at peak hours stopping at Canoga.

== 2012–2015: Silver Line improvements ==
=== Metro ExpressLanes improvements ===
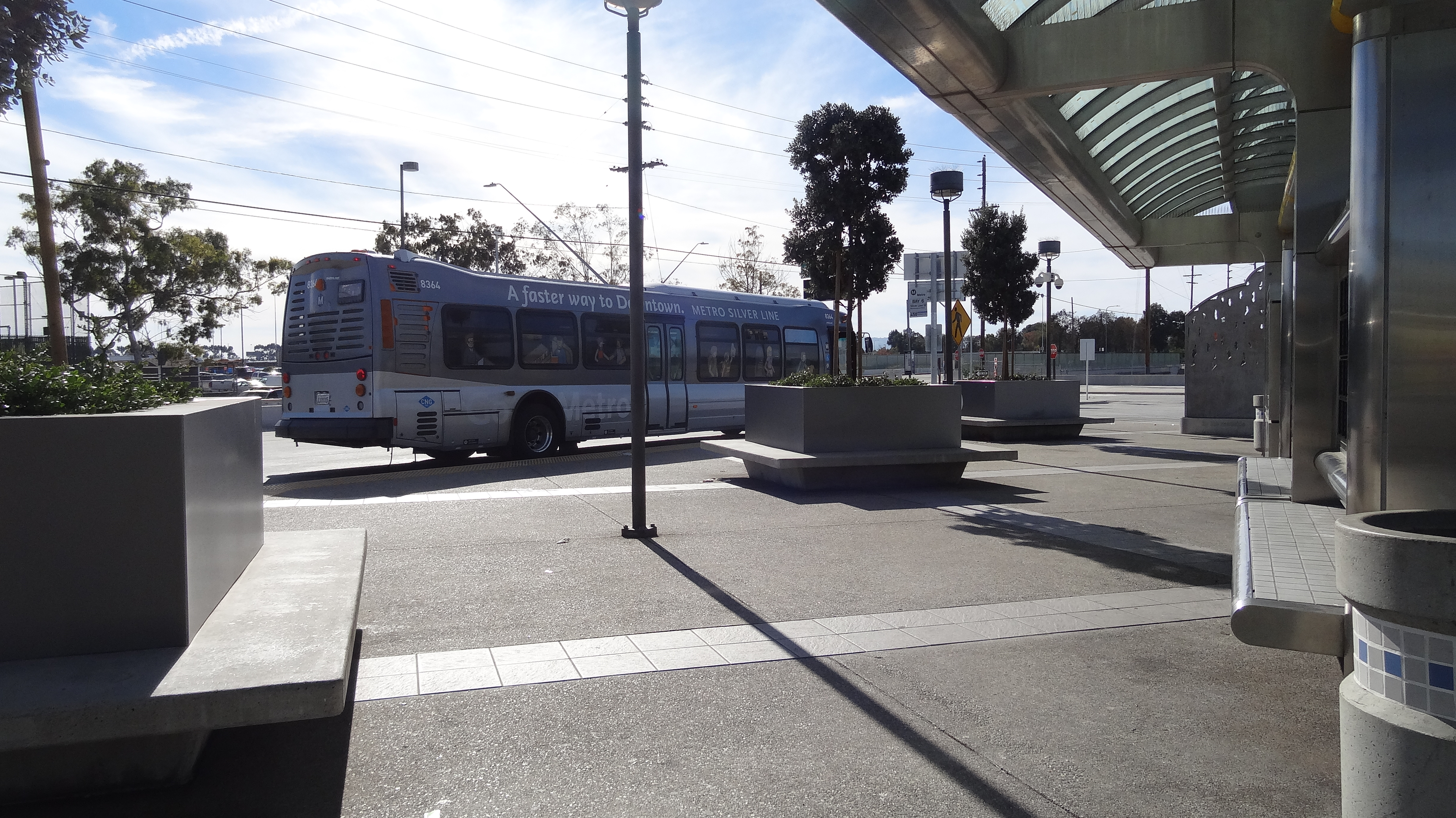
Harbor Gateway Transit Center is the southern terminus of the Metro Silver Line.

Major improvements to the Silver Line were made as part of the Metro ExpressLanes project to convert the El Monte Busway and the Harbor Transitway from lanes reserved for buses and high occupancy vehicles into high occupancy toll lanes that allow solo drivers to pay a toll to use lanes. Federal funding and some of the tolls collected were used to both refurbish the aging stations used by the Silver Line and improve frequencies on the route. The most drastic change happened at the crowded, 37-year-old El Monte Station which was demolished in 2010 and entirely rebuilt. The new station opened in October 2012 with more bus bays, staffed information counters, restrooms, improved lighting and security.

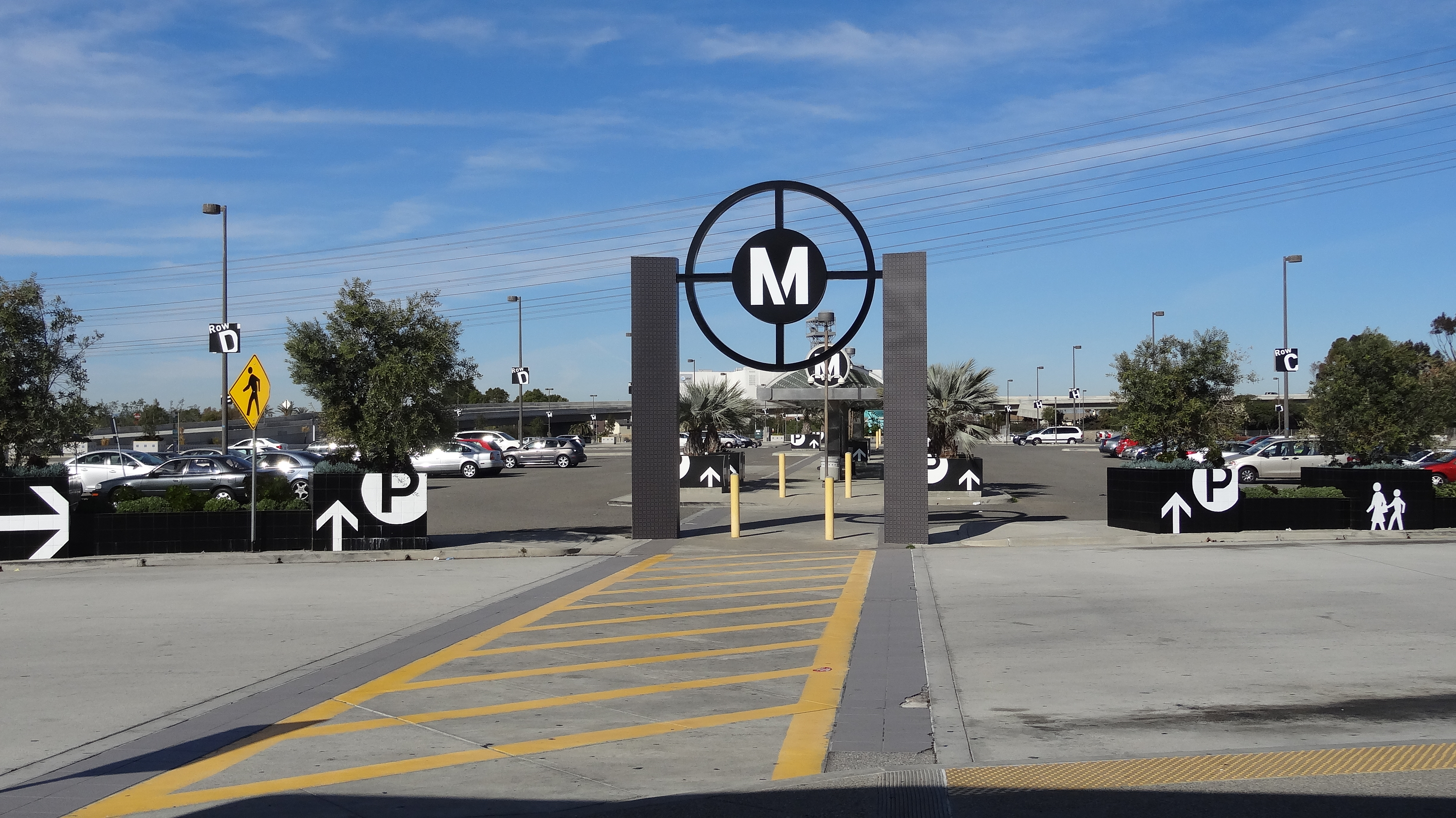
The old clock was replaced with signage towards the parking lot at Harbor Gateway Transit Center.

Stations along the Harbor Transitway were improved between early 2011 and late 2012 with the addition of real time arrival signs, new wayfinding signage, improved lighting and sound proofing. The Harbor Gateway Transit Center also received bathrooms and a substation for LA County Sheriff's deputies who now exclusively patrol Silver Line facilities.

Stations along the El Monte Busway were the last to be improved, each closing for a month in early 2015. During the closure staircases were replaced and new wayfinding signage, real-time arrival signs and improved lighting were installed.

Along the street-running portion of the Silver Line in Downtown Los Angeles, LADOT added bus priority to traffic lights to improve on-time performance in Downtown Los Angeles. This work was completed by October 31, 2012.

Starting in 2012, toll revenue used to improve service during peak hours was further improved with buses arriving as often as every 4 minutes, Saturday service frequency was improved to 20 minutes and to 30 minutes on Sundays. Sunday frequency was further improved to 20 minutes in December 2013.

=== Silver 2 Silver ===
As feared by Foothill Transit officials, the 30¢ higher fares on the Silver Streak meant passengers along the El Monte Busway often opted to ride the Silver Line to save money. That led to Silver Line buses operating at capacity during peak hours, with the larger Silver Streak buses being under-utilized. To address the problem a new reciprocal fare program between Metro and Foothill Transit called "Silver 2 Silver" was introduced as part of a one-year trial in October 2012. Fares on the Silver Streak were lowered to match the price of the Silver Line, and passengers with a valid pass may ride either route between Downtown Los Angeles and the El Monte Station. Toll funding from the Metro ExpressLanes was used to reimburse Foothill Transit for the cost difference. In October 2013 a review of the program deemed it a success and made it permanent.

=== Extension to San Pedro and express service ===
While many freeway express lines on the Harbor Transitway were truncated after the introduction of the Silver Line, a notable exception was Metro Express Line 450X. Considered one of Metro's "premium express" routes, buses made very limited stops between Downtown Los Angeles and the Harbor Gateway Transit Center, skipping most of the stations along the Harbor Transitway. The route initially only ran during weekday peak hours, but was later extended to San Pedro and operated as a shuttle service between the Harbor Gateway Transit Center and San Pedro during off-peak hours and weekends.

In December 2015, Metro combined the Silver Line and Metro Express 450X. During off-peak hours and weekends some Silver Line trips traveled to San Pedro, and during weekday peak periods a Silver Line Express route, designated as Line 950X, operated between San Pedro and El Monte, skipping most of the stations along the Harbor Transitway. The change gave passengers a one-seat ride to San Pedro during the off-peak periods and created more Silver Line service on the El Monte Busway.

However, due to overcrowding on Silver Line buses during the peak period, the Silver Line Express buses began stopping at Manchester and Slauson stations in December 2016. With only two stations were skipped for a two-minute time savings. Metro discontinued Silver Line Express service completely in June 2017. Since then, the Silver Line (now the J Line) has two service patterns: Line 910, which followed the original route between El Monte and Harbor Gateway, and Line 950, which continued beyond Harbor Gateway to San Pedro.

== 2016: Foothill Extension Phase 2A ==
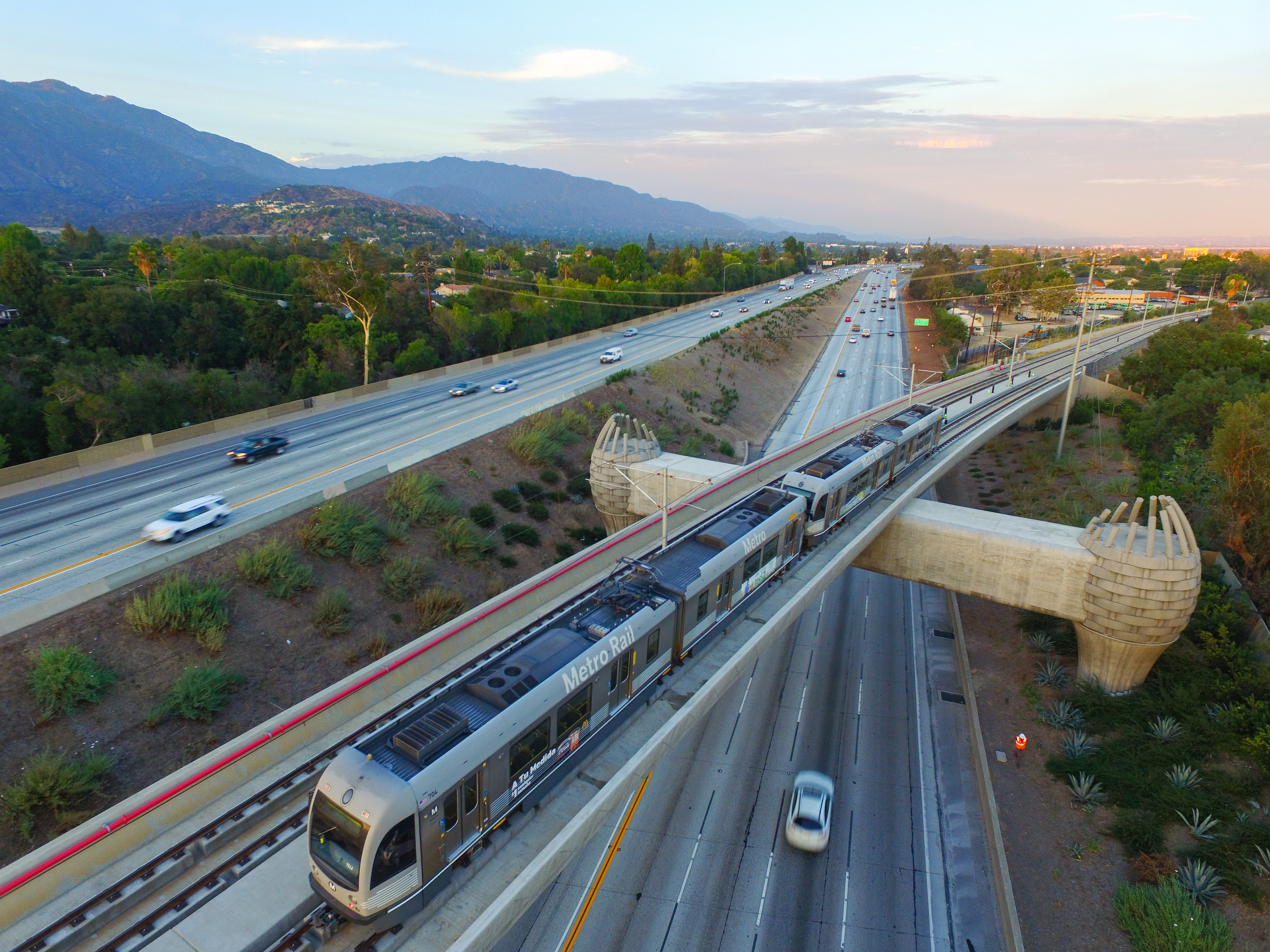
The Metro overpass of Interstate 210, constructed as the L Line's Extension to Azusa

The Foothill Extension project is a multistage project to extend the A Line beyond Pasadena into the northeastern part of Los Angeles county and into San Bernardino County. The first stage, called Phase 2A, (Note: The entire Foothill Extension is designated Phase 2, since the original Union Station–Pasadena Gold Line segment is considered Phase 1.) running from Sierra Madre Villa station in Pasadena to APU/Citrus College station in Azusa, opened on March 5, 2016.

The construction of this segment involved replacing a steel railroad bridge at the point where the Atchison, Topeka and Santa Fe right-of-way departed from I-210 in Arcadia. Caltrans deemed the structure unsafe following the 1994 Northridge earthquake, and it was replaced by a new structure known as the Gold Line Bridge, designed by Minnesota artist Andrew Leicester. The woven-basket look of the bridge's support columns emulate the famed woven baskets of the native Gabrielino/Tongva of the San Gabriel Valley while the underbelly of the bridge is supposed to evoke a Western diamondback rattlesnake.

Phase 2A also included the construction of a 27-acre (11 ha) new maintenance and operations facility (Division 24) in the city of Monrovia for servicing and storing up to 84 light rail vehicles.

== 2016: Expo Line Santa Monica Extension ==
Between 2007 and 2009, Metro conducted a study on a western extension of the Expo Line, which was eventually approved in 2010. The project aimed to extend the Expo Line from (its previous terminus) Culver City to Santa Monica and build seven new stations serving Santa Monica, Sawtelle, Rancho Park, and Palms. The extension would end at the Downtown Santa Monica station at Colorado and 4th, which is located near popular tourist destinations such as the Santa Monica Pier and Third Street Promenade.

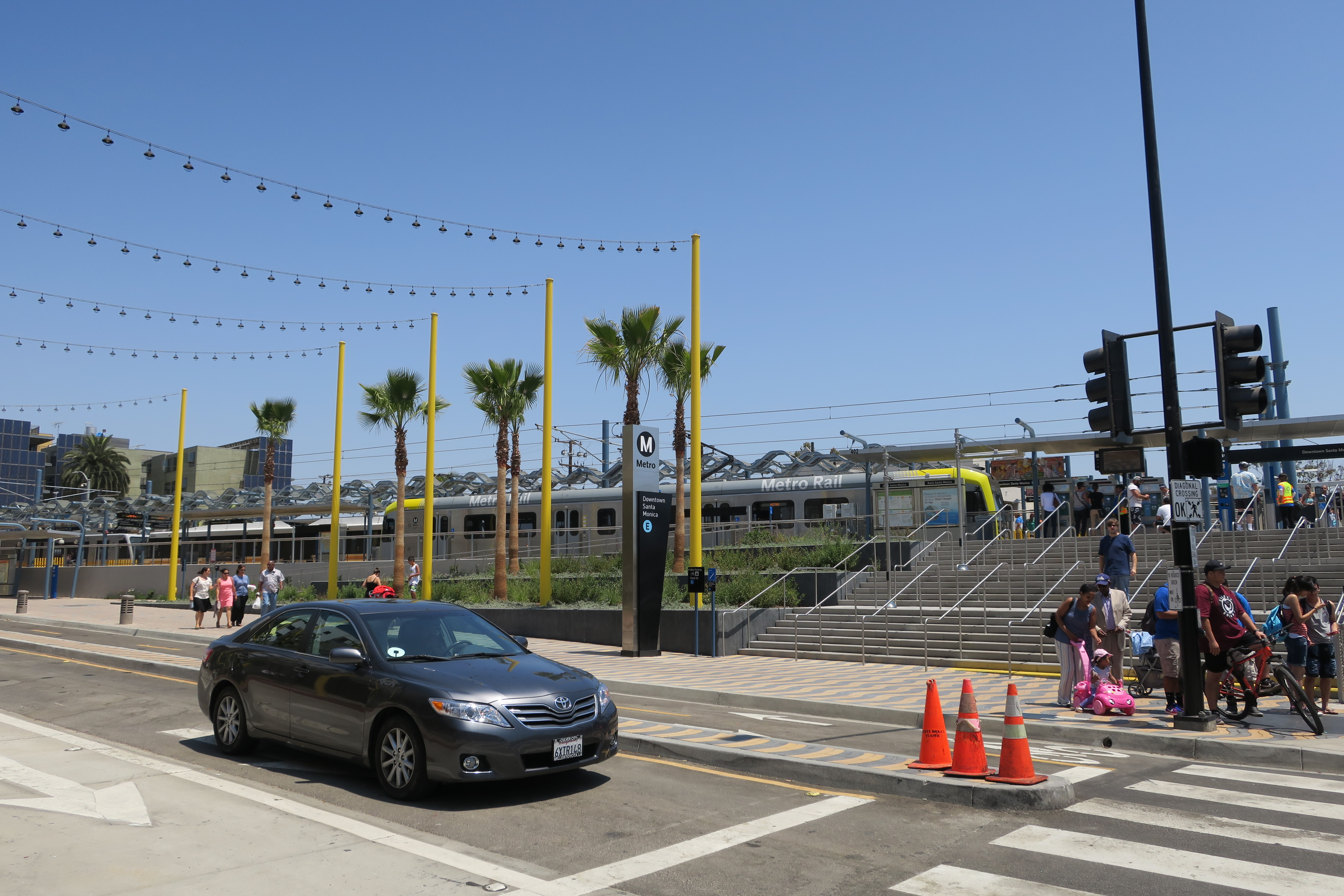
A Expo Line train is dropping off passengers at the Downtown Santa Monica station.

In the project's Environmental Impact Report (EIR), Metro staff recommended routing the Expo Line along the Exposition Right-Of-Way (ROW) through Rancho Park (which includes Westwood/Rancho Park Station), at-grade. During the EIR process, a group of neighbors known as Neighbors For Smart Rail (NFSR) organized to oppose at-grade light rail through that ROW. The group claimed that this design would be dangerous if built as specified and that Metro failed to comply with environmental law. Metro publicly disputed these claims, as did several groups supporting the current design.

On March 5, 2010, NFSR filed a lawsuit to halt construction of Expo Phase 2. This lawsuit was dismissed by the Superior Court of the State of California on February 22, 2011, and the construction of the 6.6-mile (10.6 km) extension commenced in September 2011. Including the new track and stations, the project also constructed a maintenance facility (Division 14) for Expo light rail vehicles on a site that was a parking lot owned by Santa Monica College. That new facility offers shop-related activities and has a storage yard for up to 45 light rail train vehicles.

When construction was nearing completion 5 years later, the project was then handed over to the Los Angeles County Metropolitan Transportation Authority for testing and operation on January 15, 2016. Finally, the extension was opened on May 20 of the same year, making the Expo Line the first rail transit to the far Westside since streetcars halted service in 1953.

Following the opening of the extension, ridership on the Expo Line (now the E Line) increased significantly, with its annual ridership rising by 42% in 2017 (one year later). In 2018, the new service had a daily ridership of over 58,000.

== 2014–2019: New Blue, new line names ==
A six-year, $1.2 billion ($1.63 billion in 2025 adjusted for inflation) overhaul of the Blue Line began in late 2014 with several months of projects to refurbish several stations that were completed in July 2015. The next major improvement came to the rolling stock on the line, which included $130 million to refurbish older light rail vehicles and $739 million to purchase 78 new vehicles.

=== Blue Line closure ===
The final phase of improvements began in 2019, where large sections of the line were closed for months as crews replaced tracks and overhead wiring, upgraded signal systems, refurbished aerial rail bridges (including the elevated Slauson, Firestone, and Del Amo stations), added train signal priority south of Willow Street station, renovated and modernized stations, and completely rebuilt Willowbrook/Rosa Parks station. That station was expanded with a larger Blue Line platform, new station entrances, a new Green Line transfer mezzanine, a new Metro Customer Center and bike hub, station artwork, and more bus bays. The Green Line station remained open during construction.

To complete the final phase of improvements, the Blue Line south of Willowbrook was closed for most of the first half of the year, and the section north of that was closed most of the second half; the second closure also affected the downtown portion of the Expo Line for several months starting in June 2019. During the closure, (local) shuttle buses replaced all stations out of service. Metro also operated a peak hour express shuttle from Long Beach to Downtown Los Angeles via the Harbor Transitway. During the second closure, Regional Connector tunnels were connected to 7th St/Metro Center station. Willowbrook/Rosa Parks station was closed during the entire project due to the large amount of work being conducted.

=== Blue Line reopens as the A Line; new line letter designations ===
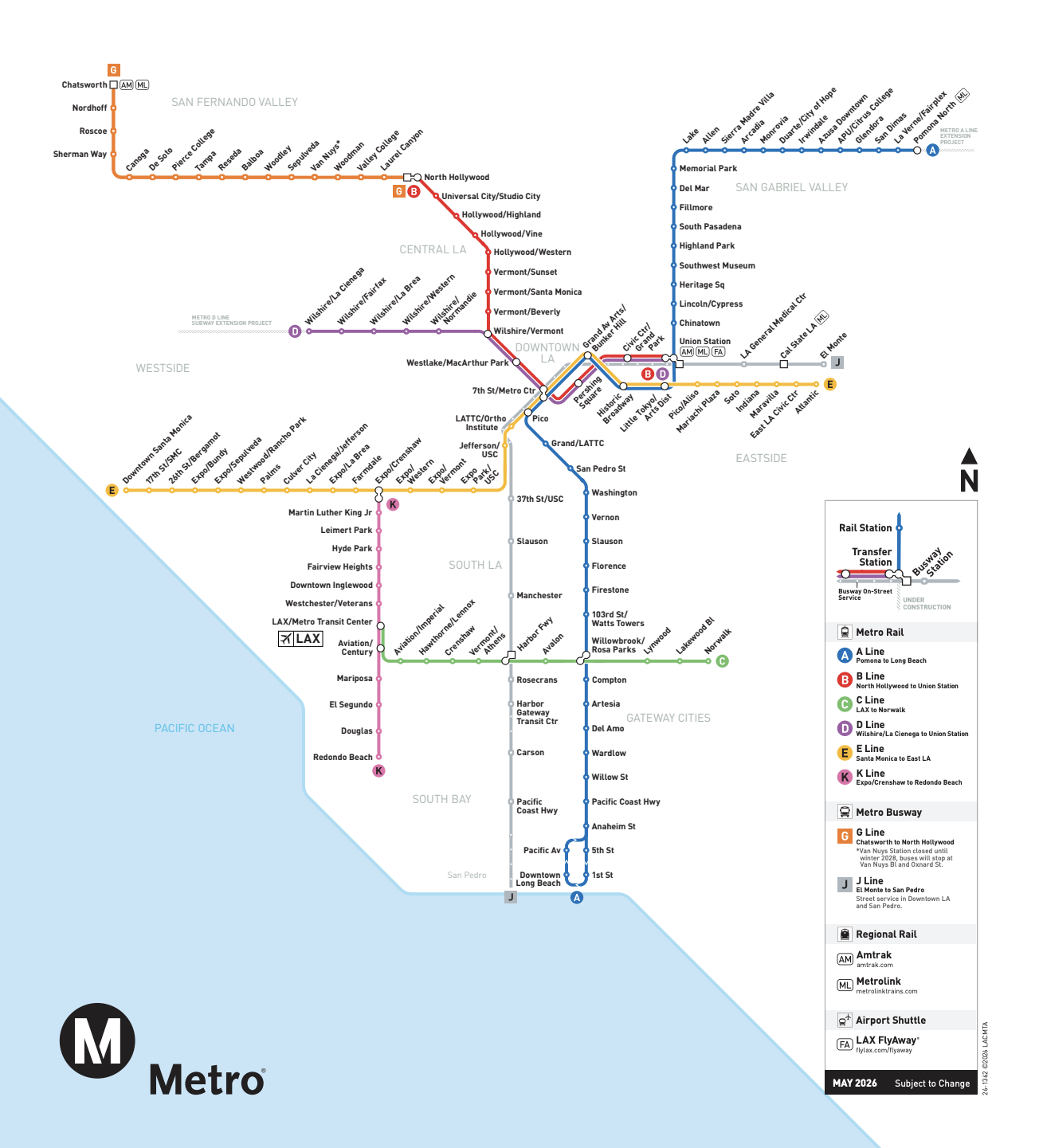
Official map of the Los Angeles Metro Rail and Busway system with the line letter designations

When the entire Blue Line reopened on November 2, 2019, it was renamed the A Line, while retaining its blue color on maps. This was the beginning of a process where all Metro Rail and Busway lines would be identified by a letter name rather than the previous system of colors. The Expo Line began to be referred to as the E Line at the same time. Soon after, the Red Line became the B Line, the Green Line became the C Line, the Purple Line became the D Line, the Gold Line became the L Line, the Orange Line became the G Line, and the Silver Line became the J Line.

== 2014–2023: The Regional Connector tunnel ==
=== Background and early transit proposals ===
Before 2023, Metro's L Line was not connected to the rest of the light rail system. Traveling from the A, E, C, or K lines to the L Line required multiple transfers. However, a new tunnel opened in June 2023 that connects the previously disconnected A, E, and L light rail lines through downtown with three new underground stations.

The operational intent of the project was to allow through service running between the four corridors (A Line corridor, E (Expo) corridor, L Pasadena corridor, and L Eastside corridor). The alignment began at 7th Street/Metro Center station. It was connected to the preexisting L Line at Little Tokyo/Arts District station at Alameda Street near Temple Street or 1st Street.

The connector was envisioned in 1984 when planning and building the Metro A Line (formally the Blue Line) and restudied with a thorough connection in the Pasadena Light Rail Corridor studies in 1989. LACMTA envisioned the line running through Downtown L.A. to Union Station and onward to Pasadena with potential future lines to the northwest (Burbank/Glendale) and to the south and west (Exposition Park/Santa Monica). The connector was not completed due to funding constraints from the voter-approved 1998 Prop A ban on local county subway funding.

=== Project revival ===
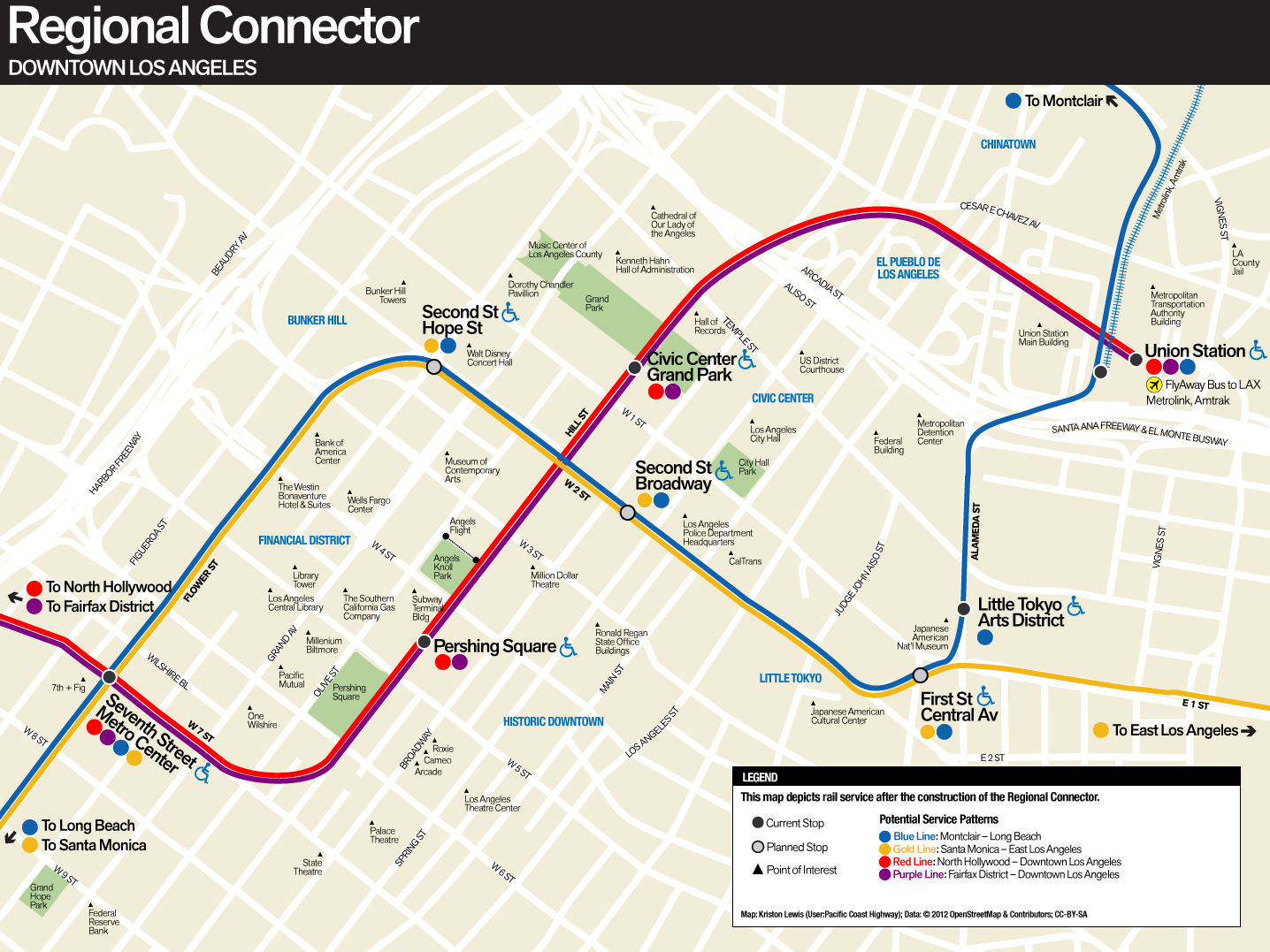
The alignment of the Regional Connector project

The connector was formally studied as a stand-alone project in a Major Investment Study in 1992–1993, but was officially revived in 2004 when staff initiated a technical feasibility assessment for a potential regional connector to alleviate potential operational constraints. The 2004 staff study looked at the potential alignments that would not be entirely underground, due to lack of subway tunneling funds.

In July 2006, the LACMTA Board voted to approve funding and staff to initiate a Major Investment Study (MIS) for the Regional Connector project. The consultants performed the Alternative Analysis and MIS in 2007. The outreach meetings that summer gave the public info on the analysis. Results from these meetings were presented to the public in February 2008 which narrowed eight route alternatives to two.

During the January 2009 Metro Board Meeting, the Regional Connector received funding to continue in the environmental study process (Draft EIS/EIR). At the request of residents, a third alternative was added and chosen as it was the quickest, served the most riders, and was fully underground. However, it would have higher costs and more construction impacts. The connector would remain underground below Flower and 2nd Streets until northwest of 1st/Alameda, where it would split into two branches. The A Line would travel on the north branch to Azusa, while the E Line would travel on the east branch to East LA. Each branch would then emerge from a tunnel portal (north: Temple/Alameda; south: 1st Street). In late October 2010, the Board certified the Draft EIS/EIR and accepted that alternative as the Locally Preferred Alternative (LPA), which also culminated in a Final Environmental Impact Study/Environmental Impact Report (Final EIS/EIR).

=== Construction and opening ===
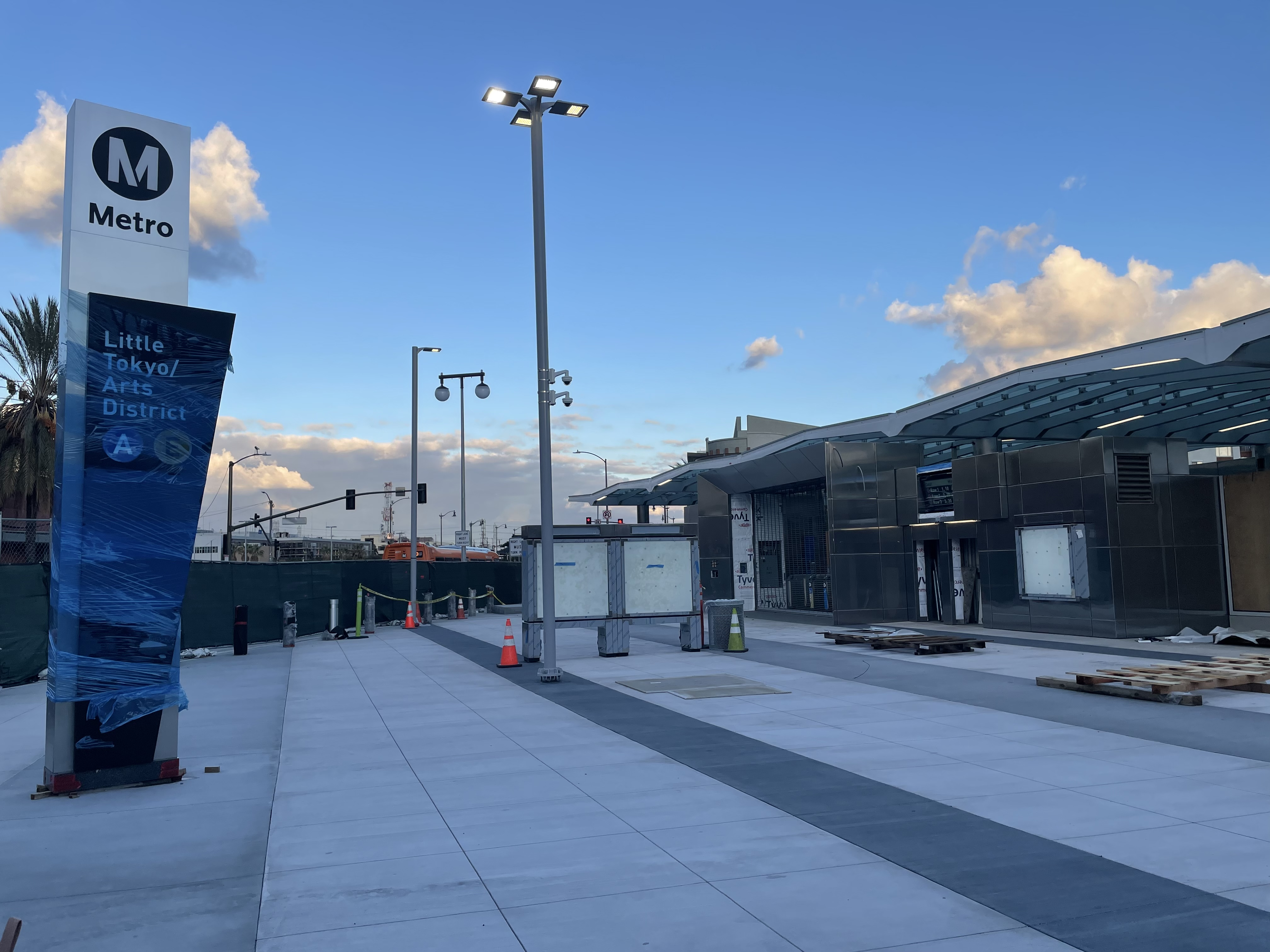
Little Tokyo/Arts District station under construction in February 2023

Pre-construction activities began in December 2012, with the start of the relocation of utility pipes. Major heavy construction was scheduled to begin in 2013 but was delayed to early July 2014; the official groundbreaking for heavy construction on the project was held on September 30, 2014. Most sections of the Regional Connector tunnel were built using the tunnel boring machine (TBM) construction method, though some sections (especially the locations of the three future subway rail stations) use the cut-and-cover construction method with an emphasis on maintaining as much road access as possible during construction.

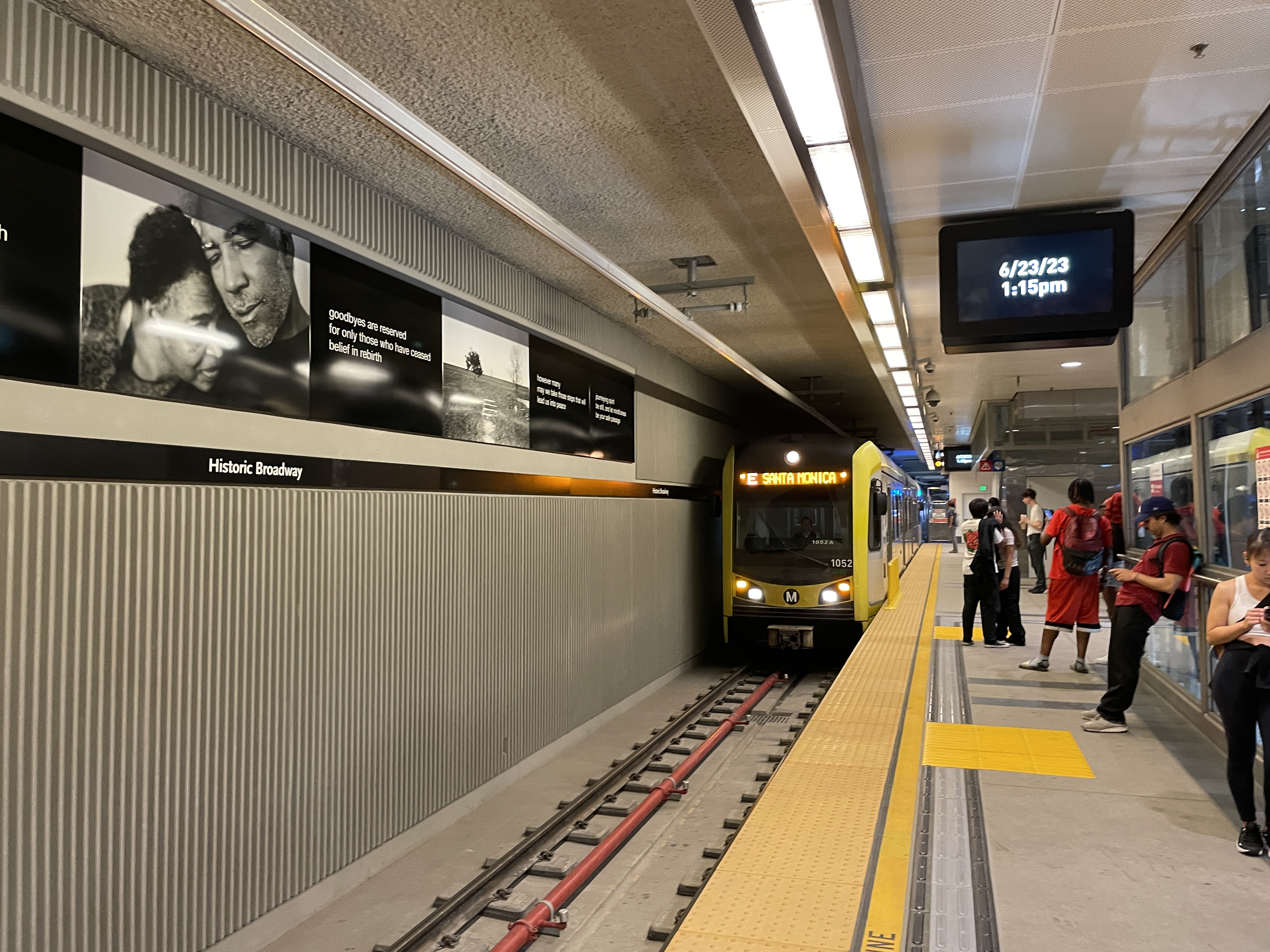
An E Line train at Historic Broadway station in June 2023, shortly after the opening of the Regional Connector

By late 2017, one of the two tunnels had been completed. The second tunnel was completed in January 2018. The project later updated to finish in 2023.

During construction, Metro had an agreement with the Los Angeles Music Center to use the most advanced state-of-the-art noise-suppression measures underneath 2nd Street where it passes Walt Disney Concert Hall and the Colburn School. This commits Metro to use procedures to ensure that the rumble of trains does not intrude on the sound quality of recordings made in the venues or mar audiences' musical experience within this sensitive stretch of the tunnel.

Metro also had to revise L Line service twice to build the new tunnel portals. For construction for the 1st Street portal (E Line), Metro had to relocate the L Line tracks at Little Tokyo Arts District station in 2016. For the Alameda/Temple north portal (A Line), L Line service was suspended from Union Station, Little Tokyo, and Pico/Aliso from 2020 until the project was completed in 2023. A bus shuttle replaced it during the three year closure.

Starting April 9, 2023, the A, E, and L Line trains ran through the newly built tunnel from Long Beach to Azusa and Santa Monica to East Los Angeles for final testing. The project opened to the general public on June 16, 2023.

== 2014–2025: The K Line opens ==
=== Planning ===
Before the Crenshaw/LAX Line project, Los Angeles Railway Line 5 yellow streetcars served Crenshaw and Florence Boulevards until 1955 when the service was replaced with buses.

A line through South Los Angeles connecting to LAX was planned following the Los Angeles riots of 1992 as a way to better serve transit-dependent residents in the corridor while at the same time providing stimulus for positive economic growth in the South Los Angeles region. It was championed by State Senator Diane Watson and County Supervisor Yvonne Brathwaite Burke, both representing portions of the corridor.

In 1993 and 1994, a Major Investment Study (MIS) was initiated. At that time, the project was referred to as the Crenshaw–Prairie Corridor. A route refinement study followed in 1999–2000 to improve the shelf life and to narrow down the number of alternatives. An architectural design and planning visioning was performed by the University of Southern California school of Architecture in 1996. A new Major Investment Study (MIS) was completed in 2003. From 2007 through 2009, Metro conducted a draft environmental review of the line, taking public input and analyzing the environmental impacts and benefits of various alternatives. The draft environmental impact statement (DEIR) had four options: expanded bus service (TSM), No-Build, a bus rapid transit line (BRT), and a light rail line (LRT). The LRT alternative has several design options (with added costs) that added extra or modified grade separations (proposed in the DEIR) and stations along the alignment.

=== Design changes ===
In December 2009, the Metro Board approved the Draft Environmental Impact Report and chose LRT as the "Locally Preferred Alternative". The light rail line was planned to serve 7–8 stations between Aviation/Imperial (south) and Wilshire/Western (north), connecting the C Line to the D Line. But due to costs, Metro changed the line's northern terminus to the E Line's Expo/Crenshaw station with provisions to extend the line north to the D Line and Hollywood as part of the Crenshaw Northern Extension Project. Additionally, the alternative also added a new train maintenance facility (Division 16), added grade separations, and replaces aerial grade-separation between 60th/Crenshaw and Victoria/Crenshaw with cut-and-cover (below-grade).

Although the DEIR included a minimal set of grade separations, the design options specified additional grade separations which County Supervisor Mark Ridley-Thomas fought for. He requested Metro to put the line below-grade on Crenshaw Blvd between 48th and 59th Streets (Park Mesa Heights) and add a new underground station at Crenshaw/Vernon. After a board vote in May 2013, Metro approved the new station (officially named Leimert Park), but the tunnel through Park Mesa Heights on Crenshaw Blvd was rejected due to its high cost and limited impacts with the at-grade alignment. This alternative, including the preferred mode and route, became the subject of the Final Environmental Impact Report which was completed in May 2011.

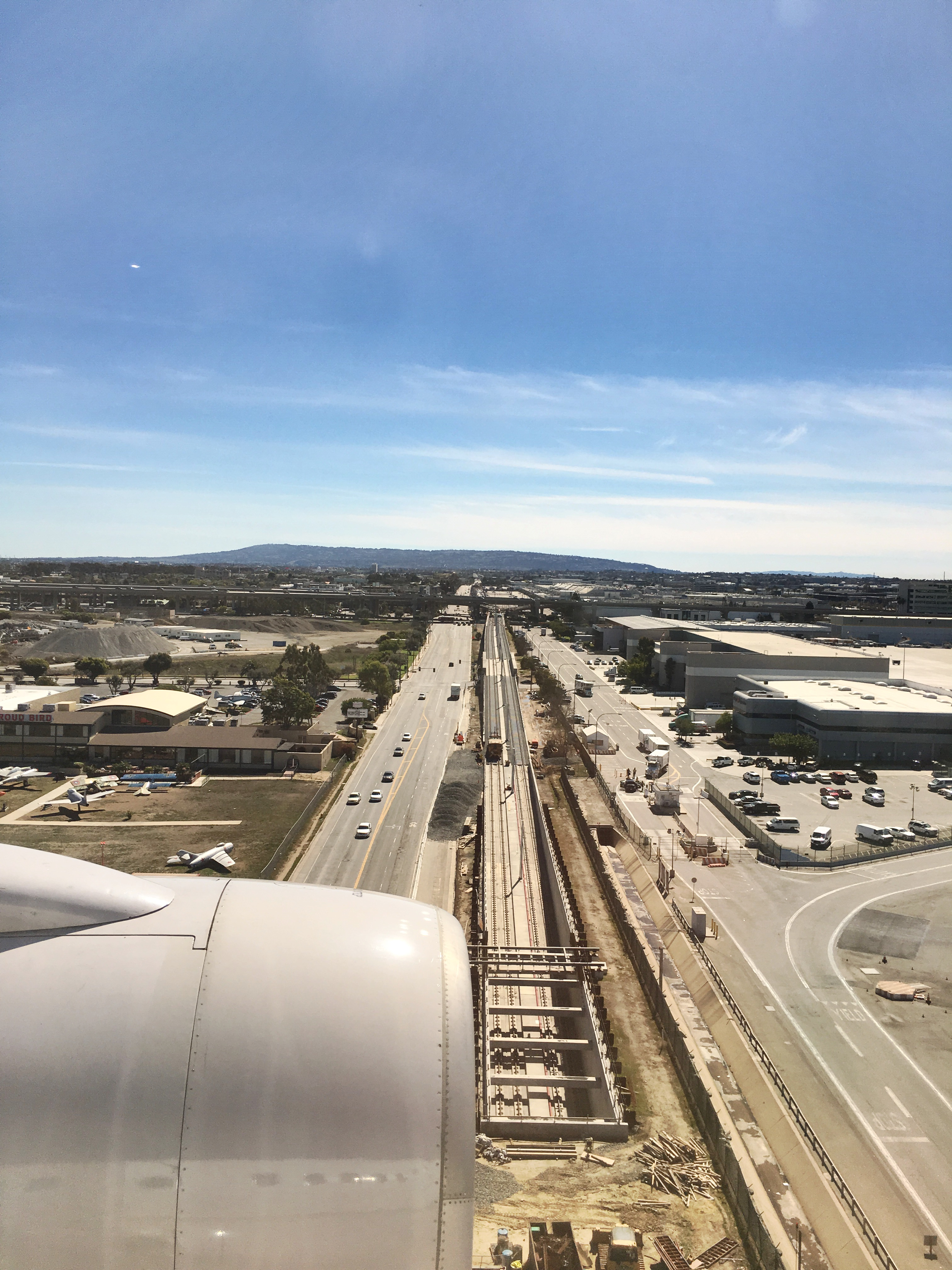
K Line tracks, under construction, as seen from a plane landing at LAX in 2018

In October 2010, the federal government of the United States awarded the Crenshaw Corridor a $546 million loan, to be paid back by Measure R tax revenue. The loan allowed pre-construction for the project to begin in summer 2012. Two years before the project's official groundbreaking ceremony on January 21, 2014, the final Crenshaw/LAX Transit Corridor budget was $1.766 billion after all of the design changes. The route was designated as the K Line in November 2019, when construction was well underway.

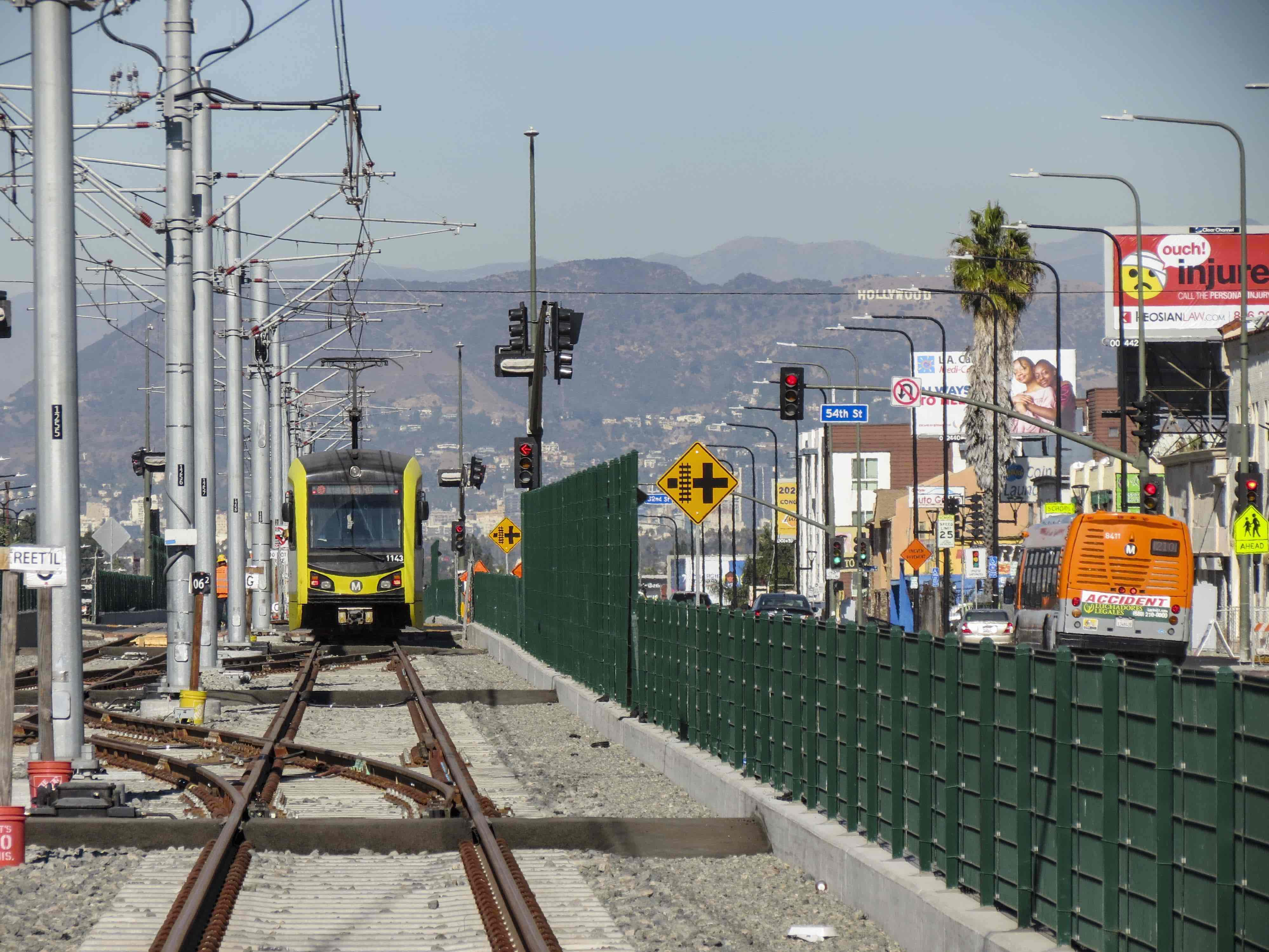
Train testing began on Crenshaw Boulevard in November 2020, marking the first time a train has run down Crenshaw Blvd since the streetcars.

=== Construction and later issues ===
Originally scheduled to open in 2019, the project saw repeated delays. In April 2020, Metro announced that the completion date for the project would be pushed to no earlier than May 2021 due to construction issues. The support structures for bridges and tunnels had concrete plinths that were incorrectly installed, requiring extensive repairs to sections where tracks had already been installed. Also, issues with the contactor delayed the line's opening into 2022. The K Line was substantially complete on June 17, 2022.

Even with the line's completion, it initially didn't connect to the C Line or LAX. The Airport Metro Connector project, which started construction before the K Line's completion in 2020, constructed a new station. The station, later known as the LAX/Metro Transit Center, would provide Metro riders a seamless transfer to the airport terminals via SkyLink. During construction, Metro initially only operated the K Line from Expo/Crenshaw station to Westchester/Veterans station with a shuttle service providing passengers access to the LAX shuttle and the C Line at Aviation/Imperial station. The initial segment of the K Line opened on October 7, 2022. On November 3, 2024, in preparation for the opening of the LAX/Metro Transit Center, Metro altered the C and K lines to their final service patterns. The C Line was redirected from its former terminus at Redondo Beach station to the brand new Aviation/Century station, and the segment between Aviation/Century station and Redondo Beach station became the southern segment of the K Line. However, the segment of the C and K lines between Westchester/Veterans station and Aviation/Century station remained unopened to revenue service due to continued train testing and construction at the LAX/Metro Transit Center, effectively splitting the K Line into two disjoined segments. This temporary situation remained in place until June 6, 2025, when Metro finally opened the LAX/Metro Transit Center to revenue service, extending the C Line to it and unifying the K Line.

== 2025: Foothill Extension Phase 2B to Pomona ==
Phase 2B of the Foothill Extension project extends the A Line from the Phase 2A terminus in Azusa east to Montclair. The final EIR was certified by the Foothill Gold Line Construction Authority (Foothill Gold Line) board in March 2013. Planning for Phase 2B began in 2003, and significant work has been completed for the segment. The final EIR for the project was certified by the Foothill Gold Line board in March 2013, and advanced conceptual engineering began in 2014. On June 23, 2017, the Los Angeles Metro board of directors approved a $1.4 billion budget to extend the Gold Line (now the A Line) from APU/Citrus College station in Pasadena to Claremont station in Claremont, 11.5 miles (18.5 km) to the east.

On December 2, 2017, officials broke ground for Phase 2B to Pomona in a ceremony at Citrus College. The cost of the project was estimated at $1.5 billion, with completion expected by early 2026. On July 10, 2020, major construction began, building four stations from Azusa to Pomona. The first part of the construction focused on reconstructing the 28 at-grade crossings and relocating utilities. Gladstone Street in San Dimas was the first one to begin. Nearly all reconstructions commenced and finished in late 2022. As of June 2023, the at-grade crossing reconstructions were complete.

The freight/light rail bridges over channels and washes began in 2021, relocating and building new bridges to facilitate the freight and the L Line (now the A Line). These bridges were the first to finish as they didn't impact vehicular traffic. The light rail bridges, crossing major streets, began briefly. As required by the California Public Utilities Commission (CPUC), the light rail crossing at Foothill Blvd, Route 66, Lone Hill Blvd, and Bonita/Cataract Ave needed to be grade-separated (light rail only) with a flyover bridge. Those bridges feature the neighborhood's citrus design and includes local artwork. All of these components were complete by June 2023.

The more complex component was the freight track relocation. The freight originally existed in the middle of the corridor, leaving no room for the light rail extension. To create space, the construction authority relocated it to the north side (south side west of Lone Hill Blvd) of the alignment. It was complete by October 2022. With the relocation work finished, crews began work on the light rail system by installing the overhead line, train control systems, and the light rail track. On June 24, 2023, an event held in La Verne culminated in the installation of the 230,630th rail clip (rail clips permanently attach the steel rail to the concrete railroad ties), officially completing major construction for the new light rail tracks from Glendora to Pomona.

The extension to Pomona reached substantial completion on January 3, 2025. Following this, Foothill Gold Line transferred ownership of the segment to Metro, who conducted pre-revenue testing along the segment. Pre-revenue testing lasted through August 2025, with the extension opening on September 19, 2025.

== 2026: D Line Extension Section 1 ==
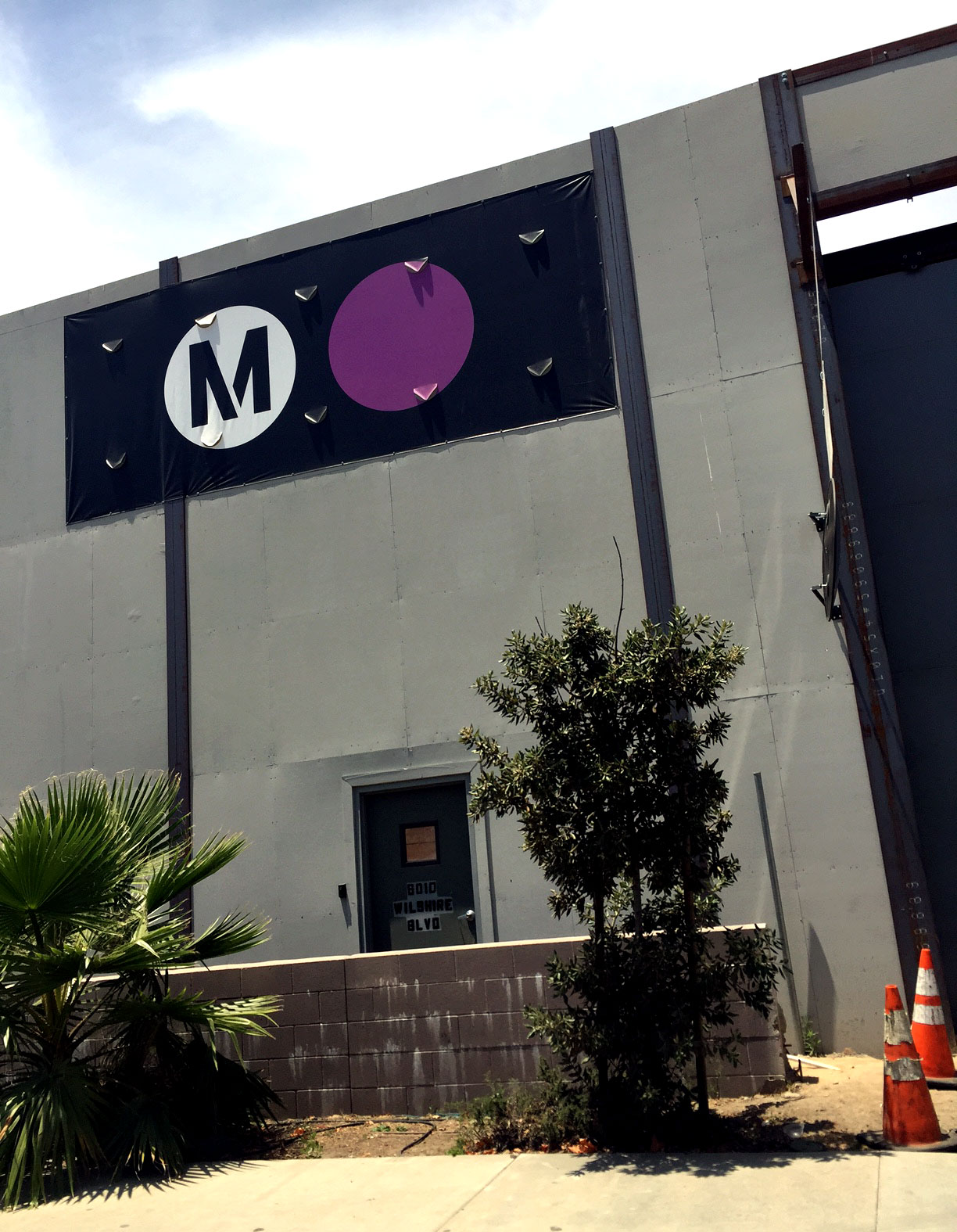
Signage announcing future site of the D Line in Miracle Mile, 2017

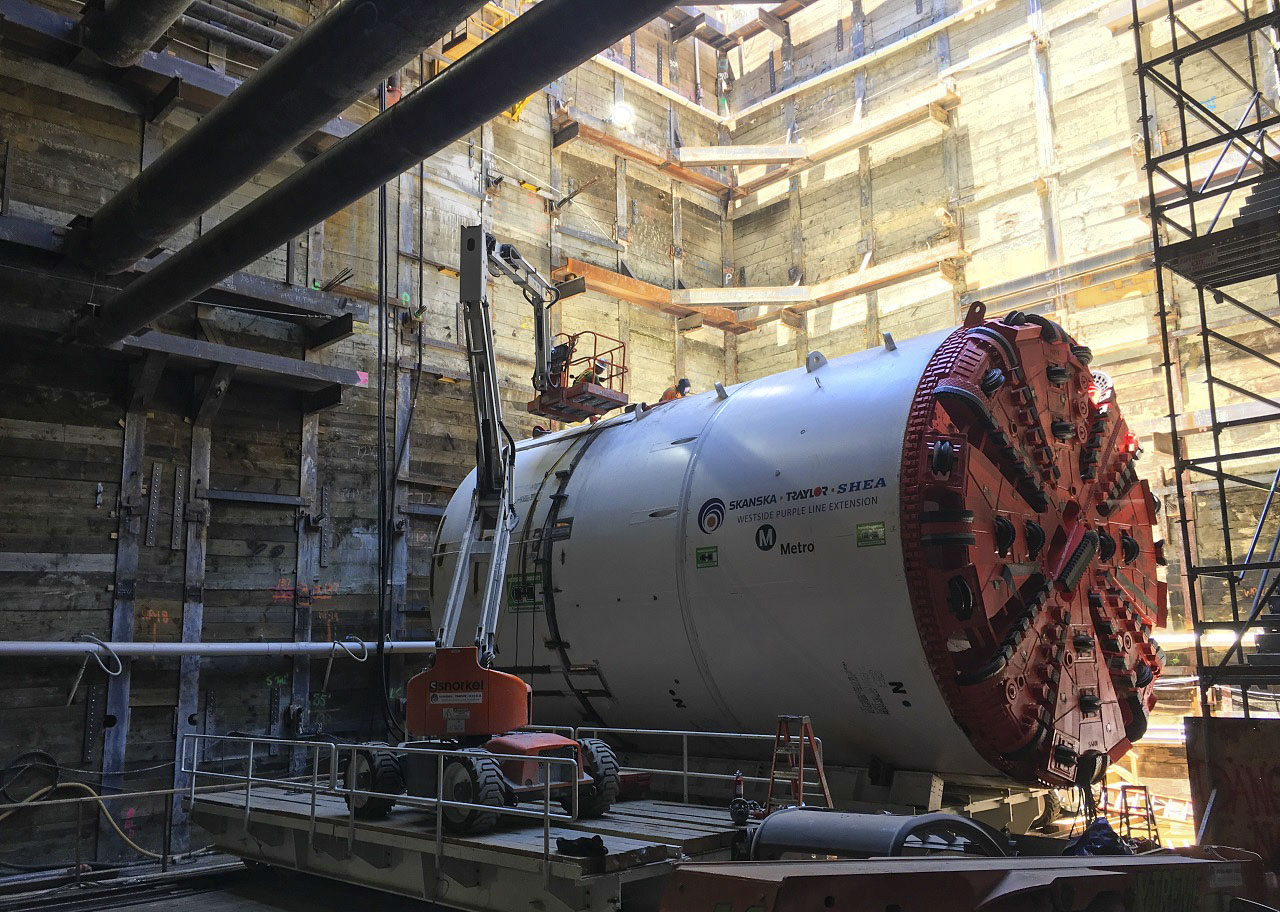
A tunnel boring machine at Wilshire/La Brea station

In July 2014, a joint venture by Skanska, Traylor and J. F. Shea Co. was selected by the Metro board, in a 9-to-3 vote, as the winner of the $1.6 billion contract for Section 1. Skanska was selected over a competing bid by Dragados that was $192 million lower because of Skanska's experience building other Los Angeles transportation projects, like the E Line and the Regional Connector.

Groundbreaking occurred for Section 1 of the extension in November 2014. The 3.9-mile-long (6.3 km) segment was originally slated to cost $2.8 billion, however due to cost overruns it is now projected at $3.35 billion. The federal government provided a $1.25 billion "New Starts" grant and an $856 million infrastructure loan, with the remainder of the budget from Measure R funds. When complete, each station will have a ridership of around 62,000 on weekdays. Twin Herrenknecht boring machines—named "Soyeon" and "Elsie", after Yi So-yeon and Elsie Eaves, following a contest involving local students—began digging the 3.9-mile (6.3 km) section in the fall of 2018 from the La Brea station to Wilshire/Western station. Soyeon arrived at Wilshire/Western in June 2019, marking the halfway point of Section 1. The TBMs were then returned to Wilshire/La Brea to head west to Wilshire/La Cienega. Construction was completed in early 2026, and Section 1 opened on May 8, 2026.
