= Toy District =

Toy District may refer to:

- Toy District, Los Angeles
- the Flatiron District in New York City (historically)
