= Downtown Los Angeles =

Neighborhood in Los Angeles, California

- Neighborhood and Central business district
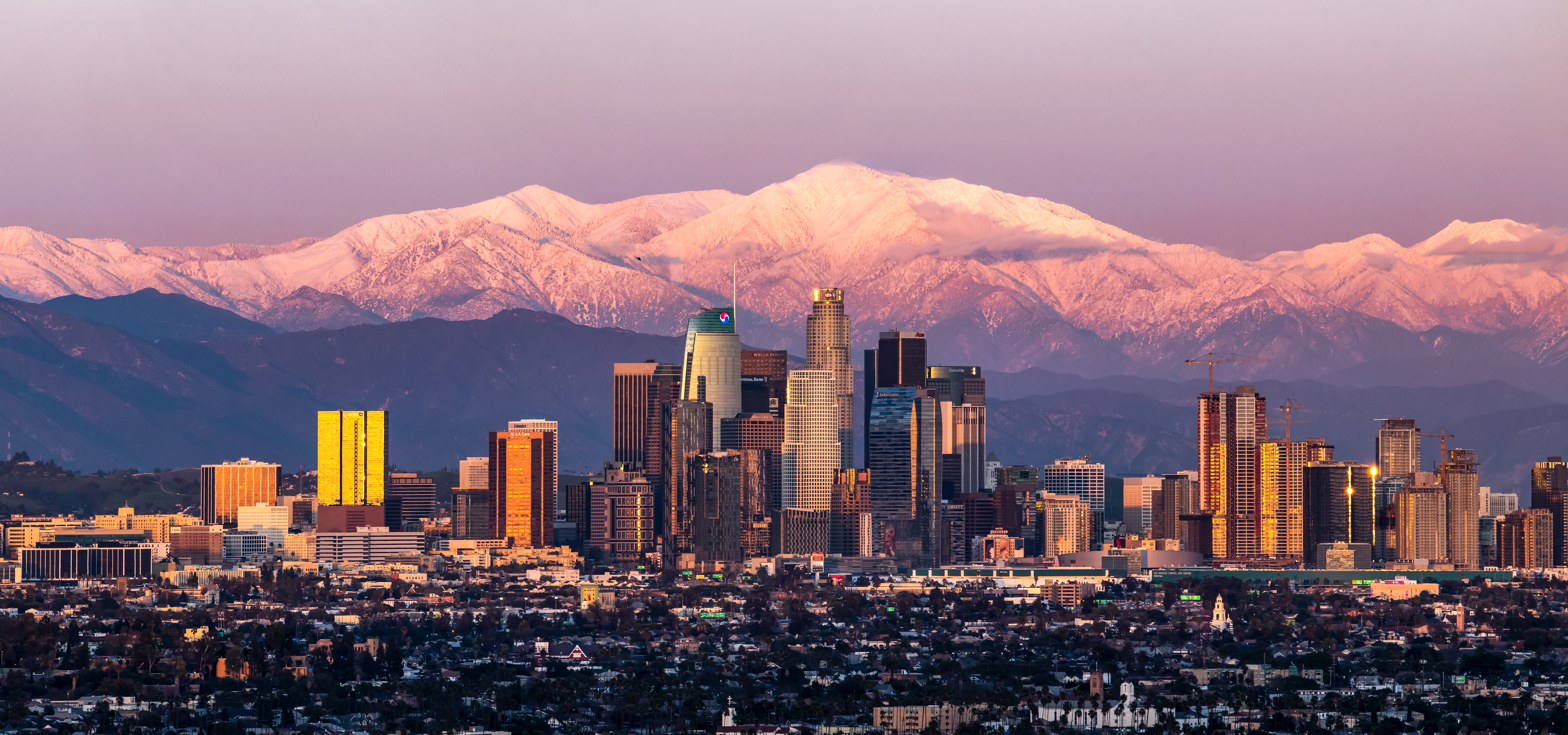
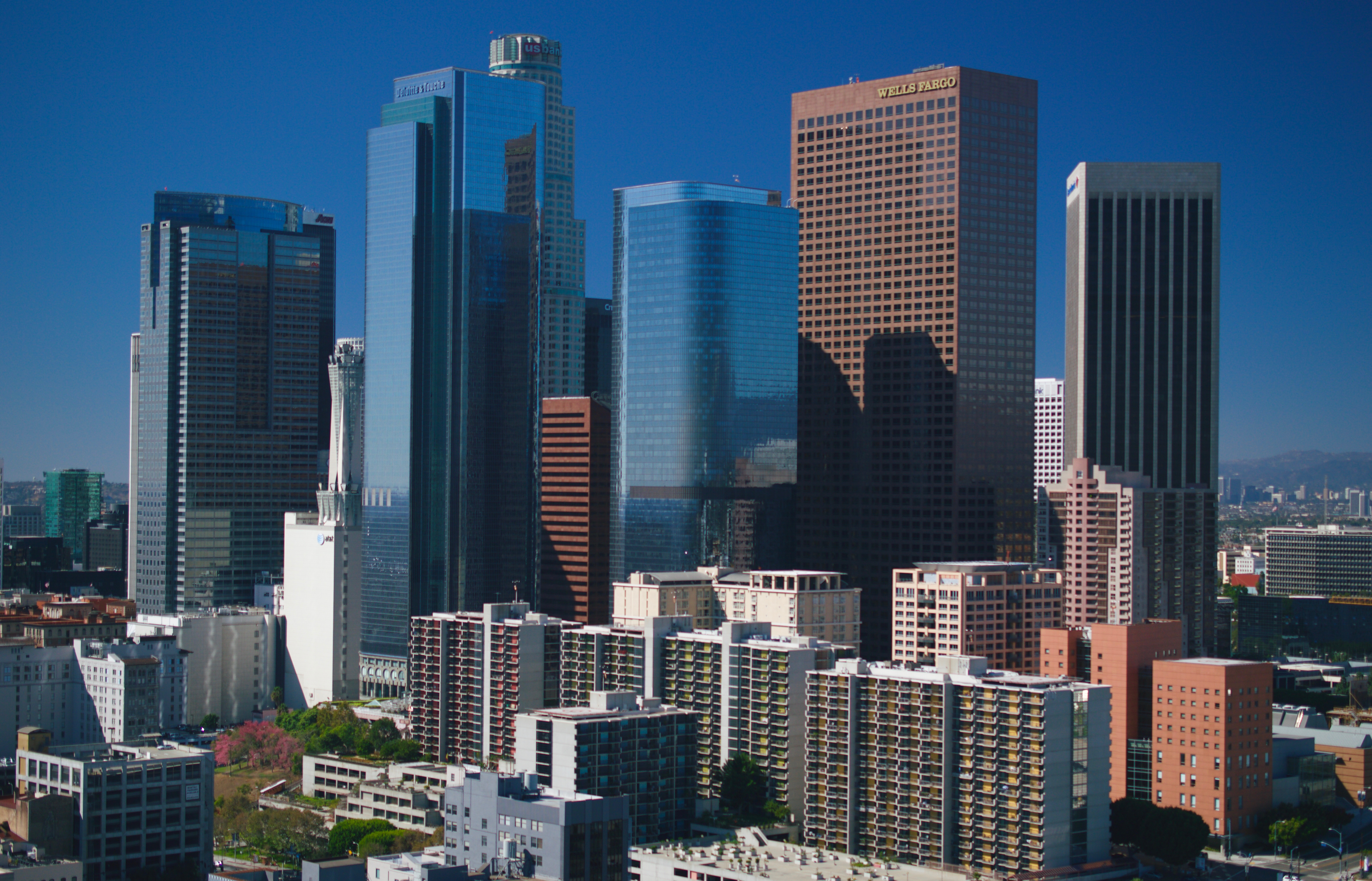
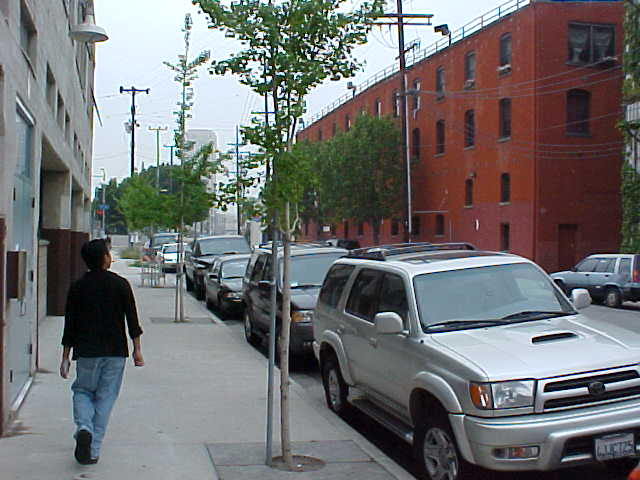
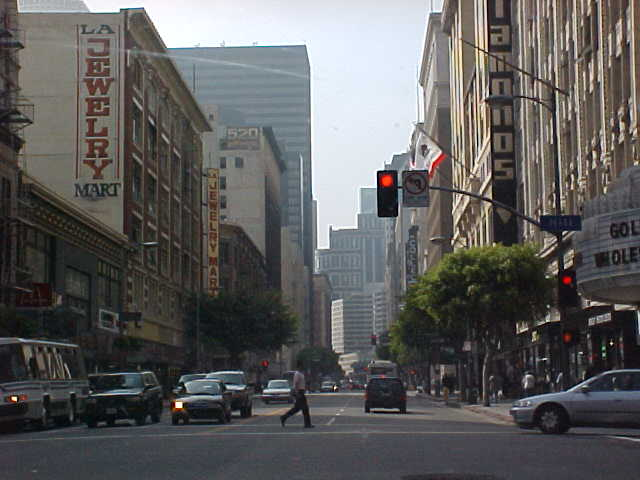
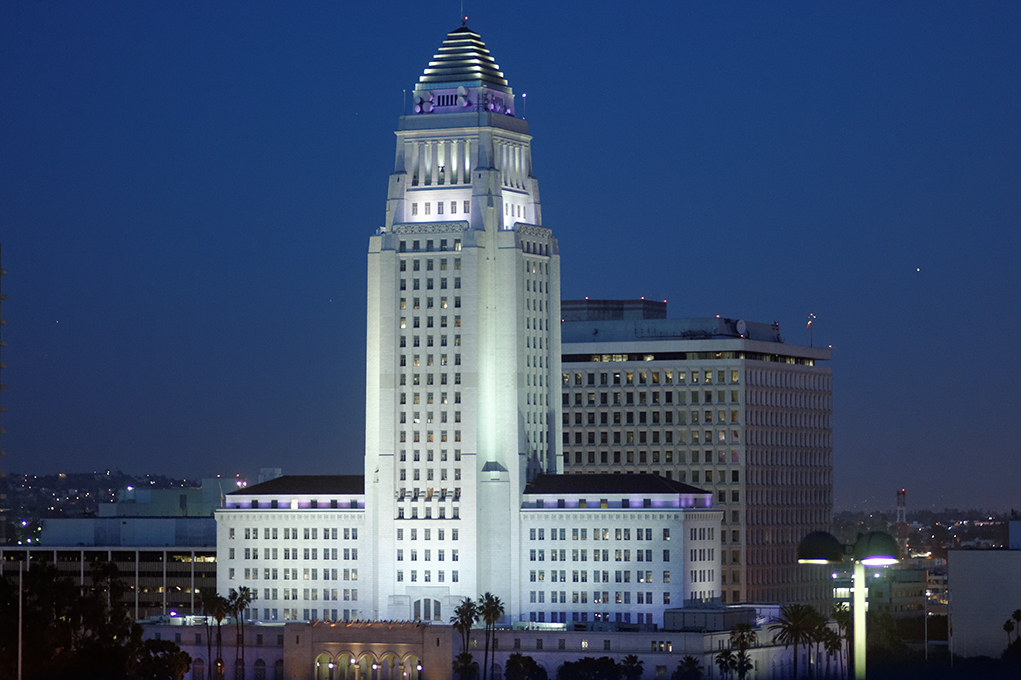
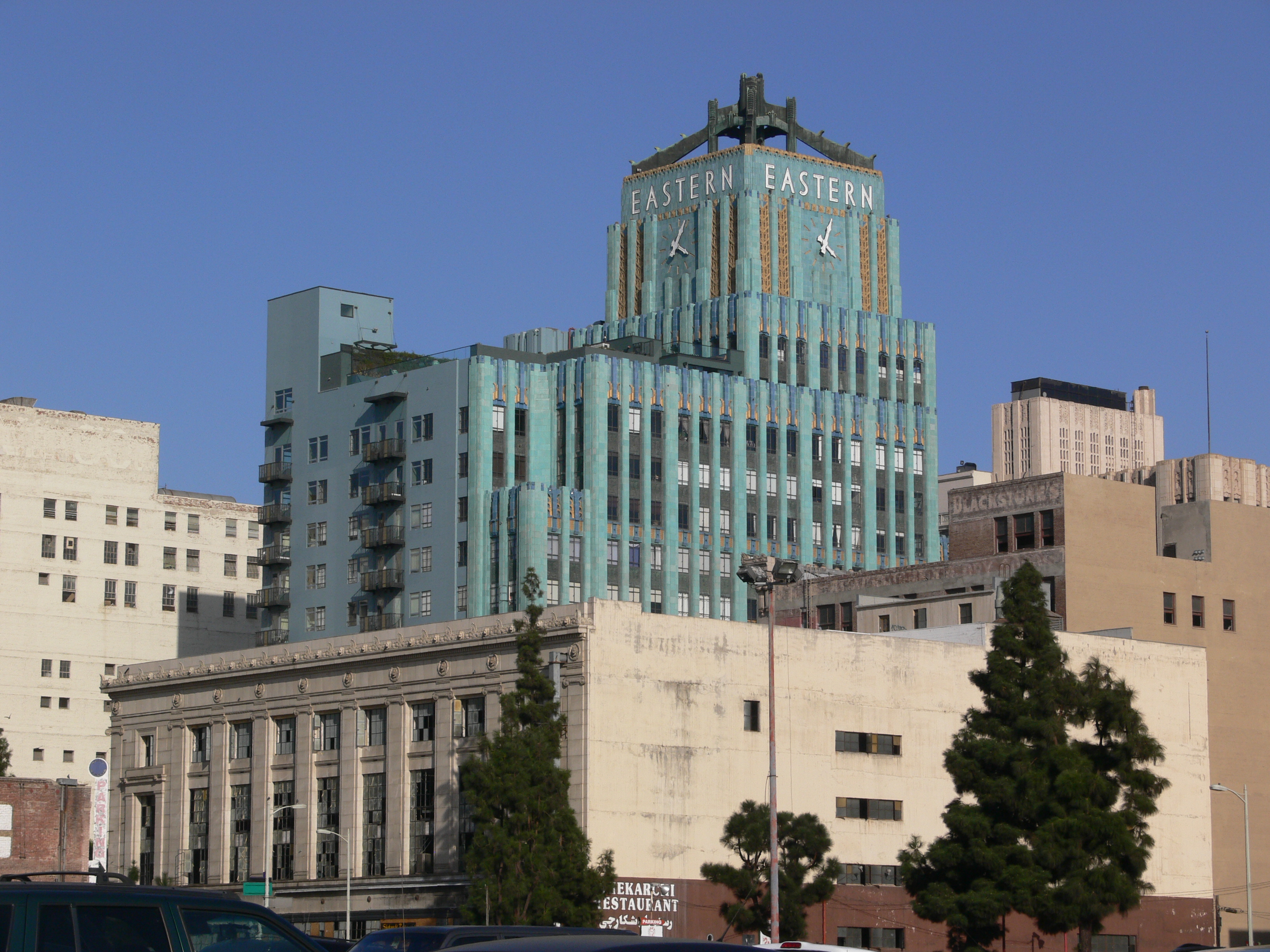
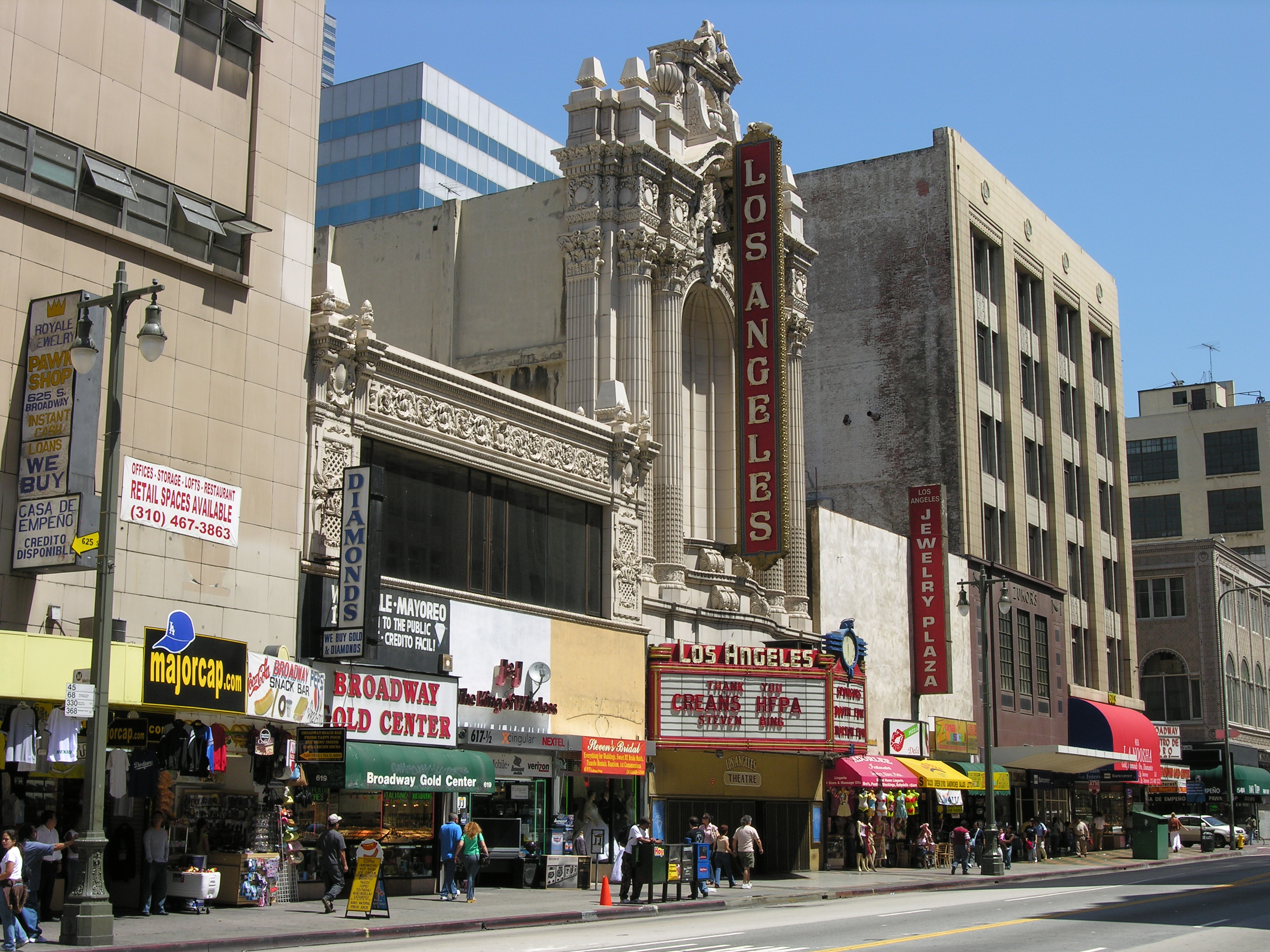
- Skyline of Downtown Los Angeles Financial District Arts District Jewelry District City Hall Eastern Columbia Building Broadway
- Nicknames: "Downtown L.A.", "DTLA", "Downtown"
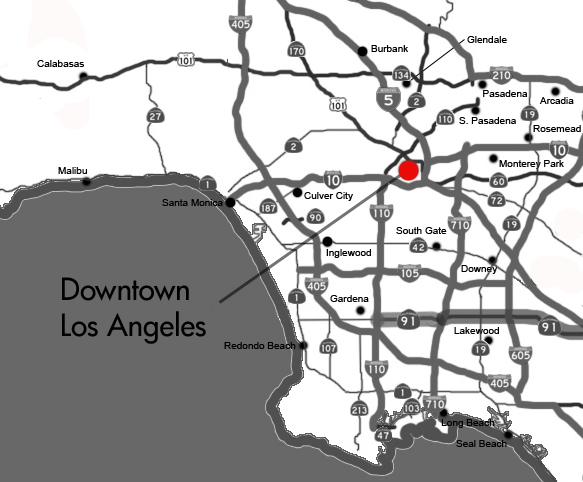
- Freeway map of the Los Angeles area showing Downtown LA

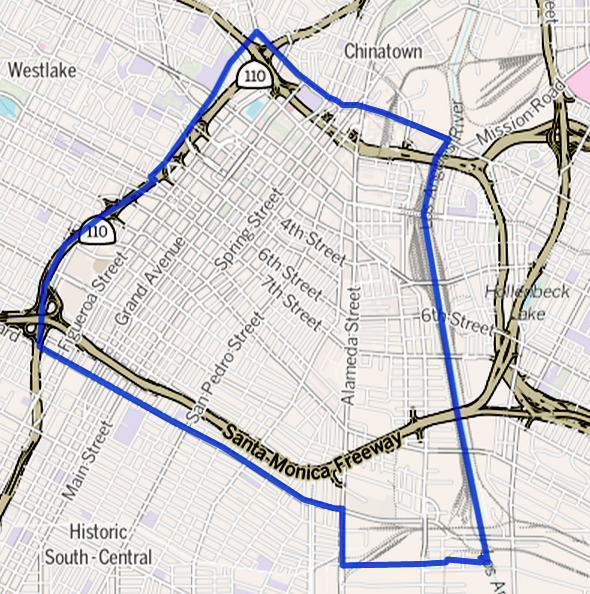
- Downtown map as delineated by the Los Angeles Times
- Coordinates: 34.05°N 118.25°W
- Country: United States
- State: California
- County: Los Angeles
- City: Los Angeles
- Downtown neighborhoods: List: Arts District; Broadway Theater and Commercial District; Bunker Hill; Civic Center; Fashion District; Financial District; Flower District; Gallery Row; Historic Core; Jewelry District; Little Tokyo; Old Bank District; Skid Row; South Park; Toy District

Area
  - Total: 5.84 sq mi (15.1 km^{2})
- Elevation: 305 ft (93 m)

Population
  - Estimate (2020): 85,000
- Time zone: UTC−08:00 (PST)
  - Summer (DST): UTC−07:00 (PDT)

Downtown Los Angeles (DTLA) is the central business district of the city of Los Angeles. It is part of the Central Los Angeles region and covers a 5.84 mi^{2} (15.1 km^{2}) area. As of 2020, it contains over 500,000 jobs and has a population of roughly 85,000 residents, with an estimated daytime population of over 200,000 people prior to the COVID-19 pandemic.

Downtown Los Angeles is divided into neighborhoods and districts, some overlapping. Most districts are named for the activities concentrated there now or historically, such as the Arts, Fashion, Banking, Theater, Toy, and Jewelry Districts. It is the hub for the city's urban rail transit system, as well as the Pacific Surfliner and Metrolink commuter rail system covering greater Southern California. Also located in downtown is the Civic Center, the administrative core of the city government.

Historically, downtown held a dense concentration of banks, department stores, and movie palaces that drew residents and visitors of all socioeconomic classes, but after the 1950s the area began to experience an economic decline. Still, it remained an important center for various activities—government business in the Civic Center, banking on Bunker Hill, and retail and entertainment, especially for Hispanic Angelenos and immigrants, on Broadway. Since the early 2000s, downtown has experienced a renaissance of economic revitalization, including the Crypto.com Arena in downtown's south end, and the restoration and repurposing of historic buildings in the area.

== History ==
The Tongva village of Yaanga was located in what is now downtown Los Angeles, possibly near or underneath where the Bella Union Hotel was located (now Fletcher Bowron Square).

=== Spanish and Mexican era ===
Father Juan Crespí, a Spanish Franciscan missionary charged with exploring sites for Catholic missions in California, noted in 1769 that the region had "all the requisites for a large settlement". On September 4, 1781, Los Angeles was founded by a group of settlers who trekked north from present-day Mexico. Like most urban centers in the Spanish Empire, the town grew, in accordance with the Laws of the Indies, in a grid-like street pattern around a central plaza which faced the first church. The area passed to American control in 1847, and the small town grew to 11,000 by 1880, The business district was centered along Main Street between the Plaza and First Street.

=== Gilded Age Downtown ===
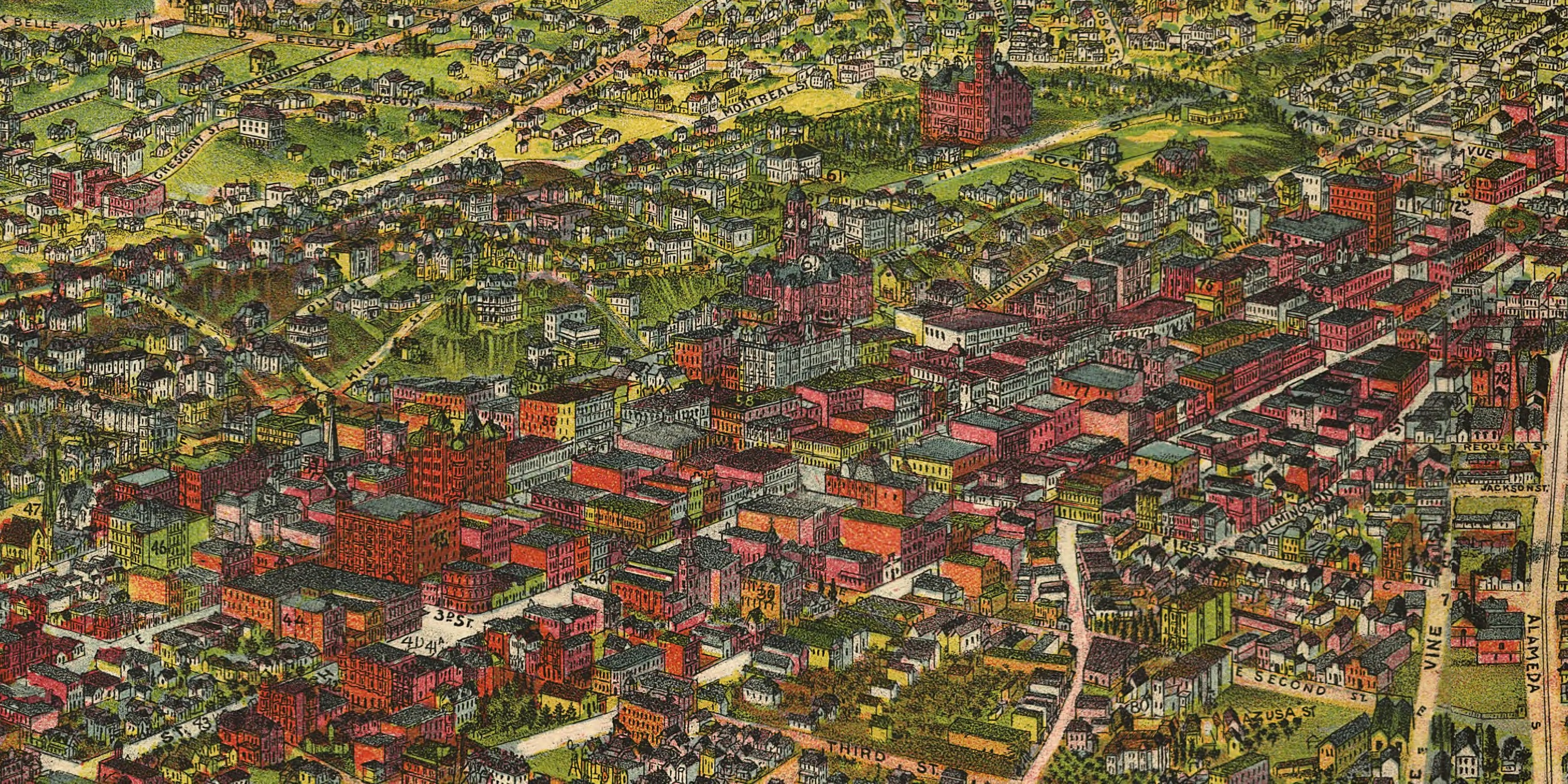
1894 drawing of Downtown Los Angeles, now the eastern half of the Civic Center district.

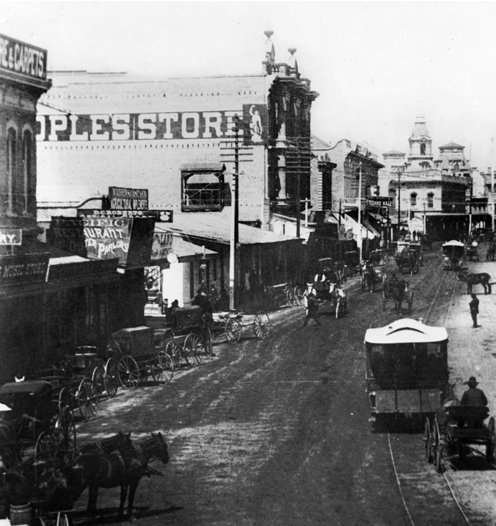
Looking northeast on Spring Street from First Street, 1880s. Asher Hamburger's Peoples Store at the center. Towers of the Baker Block are visible in the distance.

Land speculation increased in the 1880s, which saw the population of the city explode from 11,000 in 1880 to nearly 100,000 by 1896. Infrastructure enhancements and the laying of a street grid eventually brought development south of the Plaza. In the late 19th century, the areas along Main, Spring and Broadway south to Third Street were razed to make way for what eventually became the Civic Center. After 1900, larger buildings were constructed along Broadway and Spring from Third to Ninth streets in what is now called the Historic Core.

=== Downtown's golden age ===
By 1920, the city's private and municipal rail lines were the most far-flung and most comprehensive in the world in mileage, even besting that of New York City. By this time, a steady influx of residents and aggressive land developers had transformed the city into a large metropolitan area, with DTLA at its center. Rail lines connected four counties with over 1,100 miles (1,800 km) of track.

During the early part of the 20th century, banking institutions clustered around South Spring Street, forming the Spring Street Financial District. Sometimes referred to as the "Wall Street of the West", the district held corporate headquarters for financial institutions including Bank of America, Farmers and Merchants Bank, the Crocker National Bank, California Bank & Trust, and International Savings & Exchange Bank. The Los Angeles Stock Exchange was also located on the corridor from 1929 until 1986 before moving into a new building across the Harbor (110) Freeway.

Commercial growth brought with it hotel construction—during this time period several grand hotels, the Alexandria (1906), the Rosslyn (1911), and the Biltmore (1923), were erected—and also the need for venues to entertain the growing population of Los Angeles. Broadway became the nightlife, shopping and entertainment district of the city, with over a dozen theater and movie palaces built before 1932.

Department stores, most that had grown from local dry goods businesses, moved from Spring and Main streets around Temple and 1st, to much larger stores along Broadway, including The Broadway, Hamburger's, which became May Co., Robinson's, Bullock's, Coulter's, Desmond's, Silverwoods, Harris & Frank, and the Fifth Street Store/Walker's, serving a variety of socioeconomic groups from across the city and suburbs. All but Coulter's would, in the 1920s–1950s, launch branches dotting shopping centers across a growing Southern California. Numerous specialty stores also flourished including those in the jewelry business which gave rise to the Downtown Jewelry District. Among these early jewelers included the Laykin Diamond Company (later becoming Laykin et Cie) and Harry Winston & Co., both of which found their beginnings in the Hotel Alexandria at Fifth and Spring streets.

=== Decline and redevelopment ===
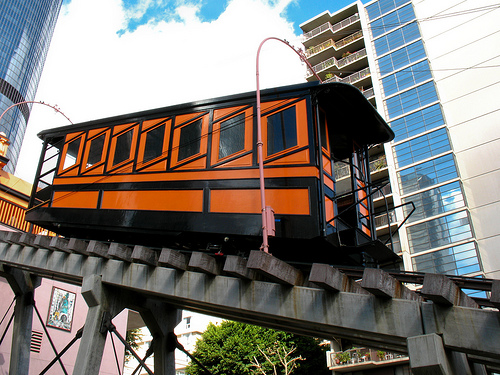
Angels Flight in November 2008.

Following World War II, suburbanization, the development of the Los Angeles freeway network, and increased automobile ownership led to decreased investment downtown. Many corporate headquarters slowly dispersed to new suburbs or fell to mergers and acquisitions. As early as the 1920s once-stately Victorian mansions on Bunker Hill were dilapidated, serving as rooming houses for 20,000 working-class Angelenos.

The Broadway theaters saw much use as Spanish-language movie houses during this time, beginning with the conversion of the Million Dollar Theater in the 1950s to a Spanish-language theater.

=== Recent years ===
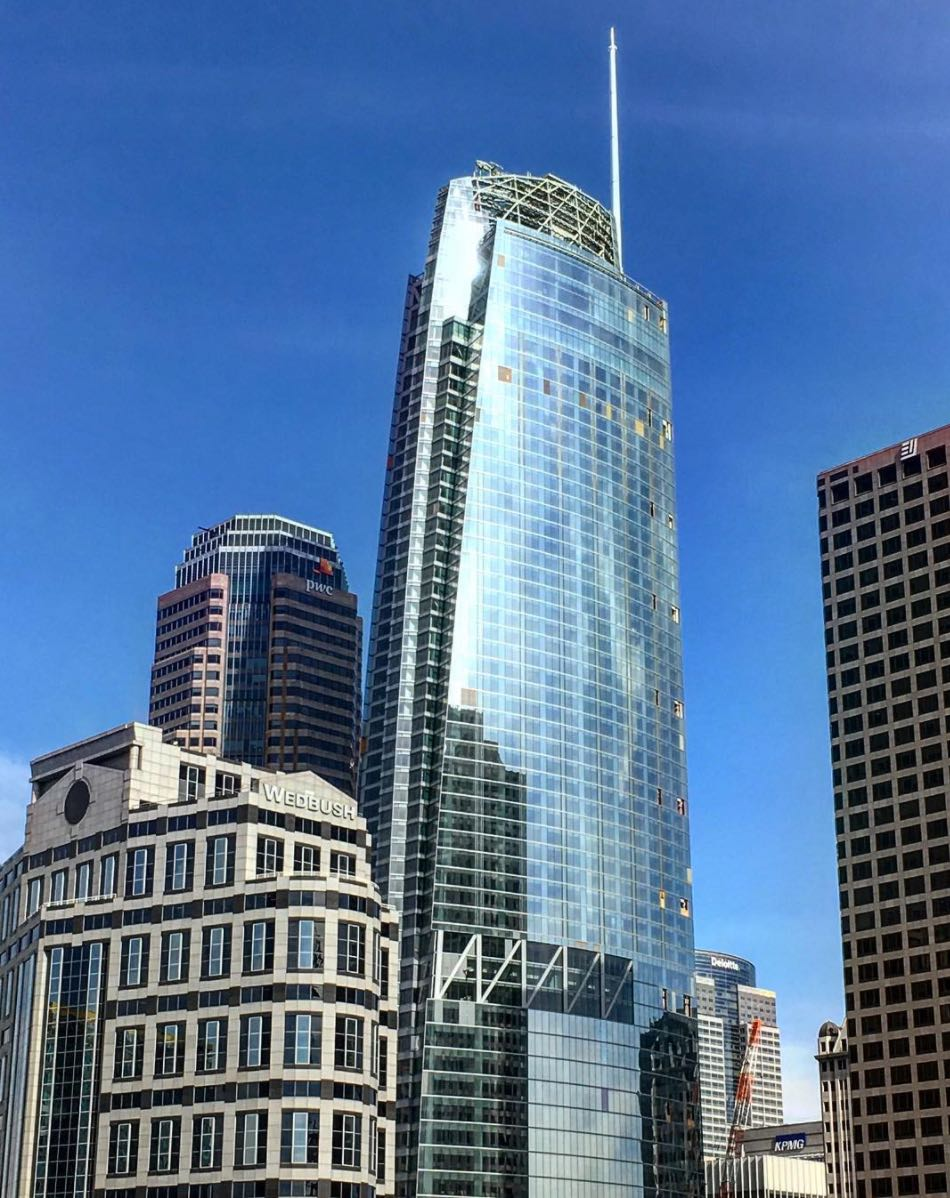
The Wilshire Grand Center in DTLA is the tallest building in the U.S. west of the Mississippi River at (1,100 feet or 340 meters). It is also the tallest building in the state of California.

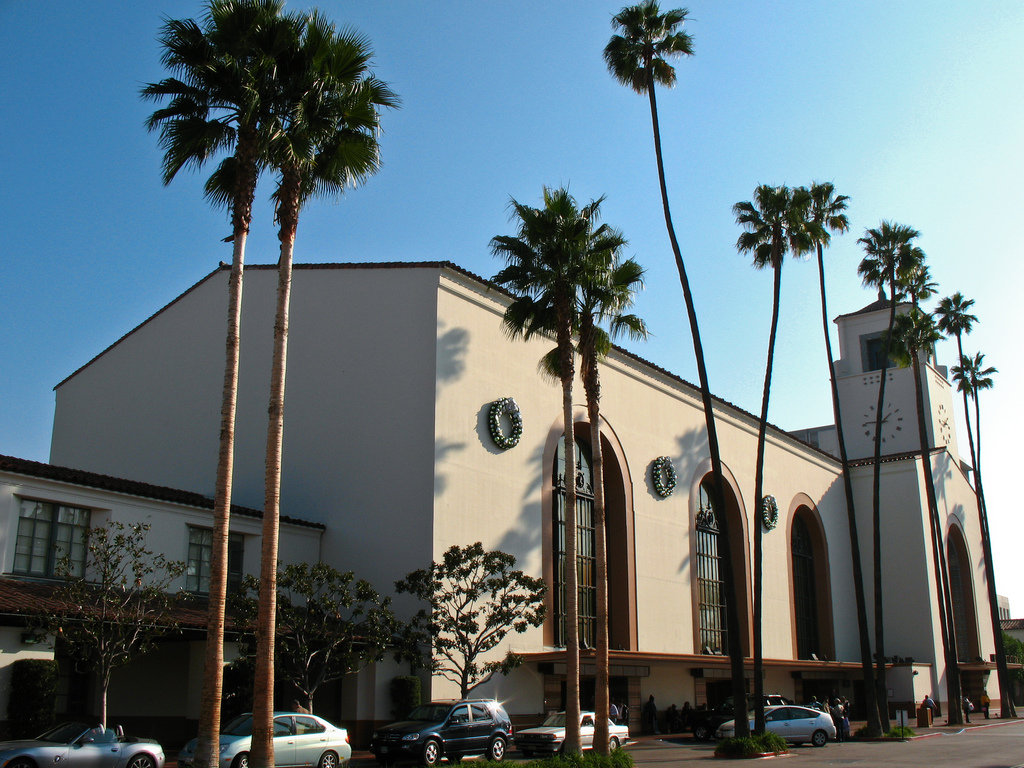
Union Station.

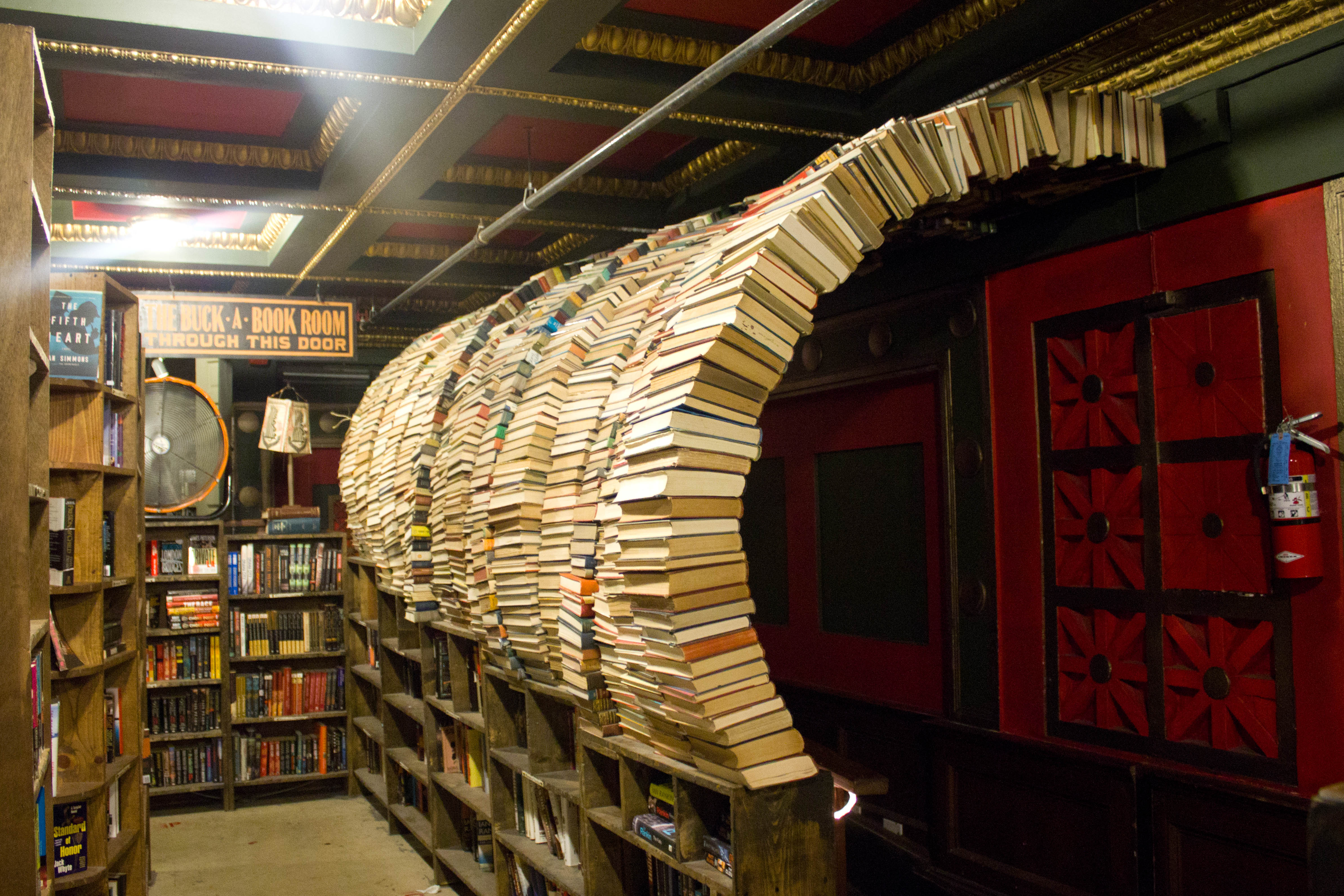
The Last Bookstore, founded in 2005.

In the early 2000s, the neighborhood became popular with artists and creatives due to low rent, open loft space, and many vacancies. In mid-2013, downtown was noted as "a neighborhood with an increasingly hip and well-heeled residential population".

Because of the downtown area's office market's migration west to Bunker Hill and the Financial District, many historic office buildings have been left intact, used for storage or remaining empty during recent decades. In 1999, the Los Angeles City Council passed an adaptive reuse ordinance, making it easier for developers to convert outmoded, vacant office and commercial buildings into renovated lofts and luxury apartment and condo complexes.

As of early 2009, 14,561 residential units have been created under the adaptive reuse ordinance, leading to an increase in the residential population. With 28,878 residents in 2006, 39,537 in 2008, over 60,000 in 2017, and an esimated 90,000 in 2026, downtown Los Angeles is seeing new life and investment.

- The Crypto.com Arena, which opened in 1999, has contributed immensely to the revitalization plans, adding 250 events and nearly 4 million visitors per year to the neighborhood. Since the opening of the Staples Center, the adjacent L.A. Live complex was completed, which includes the Microsoft Theatre and the Grammy Museum.
- Los Angeles Metro Rail, a rail transit network centered on the downtown area, facilitates access to the city center, especially from the congested West Side.
- Real estate developers and investors planned a $1.8 billion revitalization project along Grand Avenue, which included the development of Grand Park, a large city park, and the construction of major city landmarks, including the Frank Gehry-designed Walt Disney Concert Hall and contemporary art museum The Broad, which opened in 2015.
- On August 7, 2007, the Los Angeles City Council approved sweeping changes in zoning and development rules for the downtown area. Strongly advocated by Mayor Antonio Villaraigosa, the changes allow larger and denser developments downtown; developers who reserve 15% of their units for low-income residents are now exempt from some open-space requirements and can make their buildings 35% larger than current zoning codes allow.
- In 2009, Bottega Louie opened on the first floor of the historic Brockman Building on Grand Avenue and Seventh Street. It contributed to the revitalization of DTLA by creating Restaurant Row, which has since brought numerous new restaurants and retail shops to the area. In 2012, the upper 11 floors of the Brockman Building were bought with the intention of being sold as luxury lofts.
- Several labels of Warner Music Group moved into the Los Angeles Arts District in 2019 where the company had purchased a former Ford Motor Company assembly plant.
- Broadway retail is transitioning from a broad mix of stores catering mostly to Hispanic immigrants and a burgeoning sneaker and streetwear retail cluster has emerged from 4th to 9th streets: Sneaker Row.
- Oceanwide Plaza has planned to open in 2020, but was later changed to unknown date due to financial problems and costs.

Multiple Olympic and Paralympic events will be held in DTLA during the 2028 Summer Olympics and Paralympics. The Los Angeles Organizing Committee for the 2028 Olympic and Paralympic Games is headquartered in Downtown LA at the USC Tower.

After six years of construction, the new Sixth Street Viaduct opened on July 9, 2022, at a cost of $588 million. This new bridge replaced a 1932 viaduct of the same name which was demolished in 2016 due to a fact that it would collapse if there were a major earthquake, and alkali-silica reaction – colloquially known as "concrete cancer". Pedestrian and bicycle access points link to other projects such as 12 acres of new park space below the viaduct.

On July 7, 2026, the Frank Gehry–designed project is slated to open in 2027, which is located in the northwest corner of the intersection of 2nd and Hill Streets on Bunker Hill, that features concert halls, incorporating publicly accessible garden, and being a installation of the cluster of cultural destinations.

== Shopping malls ==
Shopping centers include FIGat7th, and The Bloc Los Angeles, an open-air shopping area. Others include Japanese Village Plaza in Little Tokyo, City National Plaza, the Homer Laughlin Building, and the Los Angeles Mall.

== Geography ==
Downtown Los Angeles is flanked by Echo Park to the north and northwest, Chinatown to the northeast, Boyle Heights to the east, Vernon to the south, Historic South Central and University Park to the southwest, and Pico-Union and Westlake to the west.

Downtown is bounded on the northeast by Cesar Chavez Avenue, on the east by the Los Angeles River, on the south by the Los Angeles city line with Vernon, on the southwest by East Washington Boulevard and on the west by the 110 Freeway or Beaudry Avenue, including the entire Four Level Interchange with the 101 Freeway.

=== Districts ===
The neighborhood includes these districts:

- Arts District
- Bunker Hill
- Civic Center (built on the razed site of the Central Business District during the 1880s–1890s)
- Fashion District
- Financial District
- Flower District
- Gallery Row
- Historic Core (contains the Broadway Theater District, Spring Street Financial District and Old Bank District)
- The Run
- Industrial District
- Jewelry District
- Little Tokyo
- Skid Row
- South Park
- Toy District
- Wholesale District or Warehouse District

=== Climate ===
Climate data for Los Angeles (USC, Downtown), 1991–2020 normals, extremes 1877–present
Month	Jan	Feb	Mar	Apr	May	Jun	Jul	Aug	Sep	Oct	Nov	Dec	Year
Record high °F (°C)	95 (35)	95 (35)	99 (37)	106 (41)	103 (39)	112 (44)	109 (43)	106 (41)	113 (45)	108 (42)	100 (38)	92 (33)	113 (45)
Mean maximum °F (°C)	83.0 (28.3)	82.8 (28.2)	85.8 (29.9)	90.1 (32.3)	88.9 (31.6)	89.1 (31.7)	93.5 (34.2)	95.2 (35.1)	99.4 (37.4)	95.7 (35.4)	88.9 (31.6)	81.0 (27.2)	101.5 (38.6)
Mean daily maximum °F (°C)	68.0 (20.0)	68.0 (20.0)	69.9 (21.1)	72.4 (22.4)	73.7 (23.2)	77.2 (25.1)	82.0 (27.8)	84.0 (28.9)	83.0 (28.3)	78.6 (25.9)	72.9 (22.7)	67.4 (19.7)	74.8 (23.8)
Daily mean °F (°C)	58.4 (14.7)	59.0 (15.0)	61.1 (16.2)	63.6 (17.6)	65.9 (18.8)	69.3 (20.7)	73.3 (22.9)	74.7 (23.7)	73.6 (23.1)	69.3 (20.7)	63.0 (17.2)	57.8 (14.3)	65.8 (18.8)
Mean daily minimum °F (°C)	48.9 (9.4)	50.0 (10.0)	52.4 (11.3)	54.8 (12.7)	58.1 (14.5)	61.4 (16.3)	64.7 (18.2)	65.4 (18.6)	64.2 (17.9)	59.9 (15.5)	53.1 (11.7)	48.2 (9.0)	56.8 (13.8)
Mean minimum °F (°C)	41.4 (5.2)	42.9 (6.1)	45.4 (7.4)	48.9 (9.4)	53.5 (11.9)	57.4 (14.1)	61.1 (16.2)	61.7 (16.5)	59.1 (15.1)	53.7 (12.1)	45.4 (7.4)	40.5 (4.7)	39.2 (4.0)
Record low °F (°C)	28 (−2)	28 (−2)	31 (−1)	36 (2)	40 (4)	46 (8)	49 (9)	49 (9)	44 (7)	40 (4)	34 (1)	30 (−1)	28 (−2)
Average rainfall inches (mm)	3.29 (84)	3.64 (92)	2.23 (57)	0.69 (18)	0.32 (8.1)	0.09 (2.3)	0.02 (0.51)	0.00 (0.00)	0.13 (3.3)	0.58 (15)	0.78 (20)	2.48 (63)	14.25 (362)
Average rainy days (≥ 0.01 in)	6.1	6.3	5.1	2.8	1.9	0.5	0.4	0.1	0.4	2.2	2.8	5.5	34.1
Mean monthly sunshine hours	225.3	222.5	267.0	303.5	276.2	275.8	364.1	349.5	278.5	255.1	217.3	219.4	3,254.2
Percentage possible sunshine	71	72	72	78	64	64	83	84	75	73	70	71	73
Source: NOAA (sun 1961–1977)

== Population ==
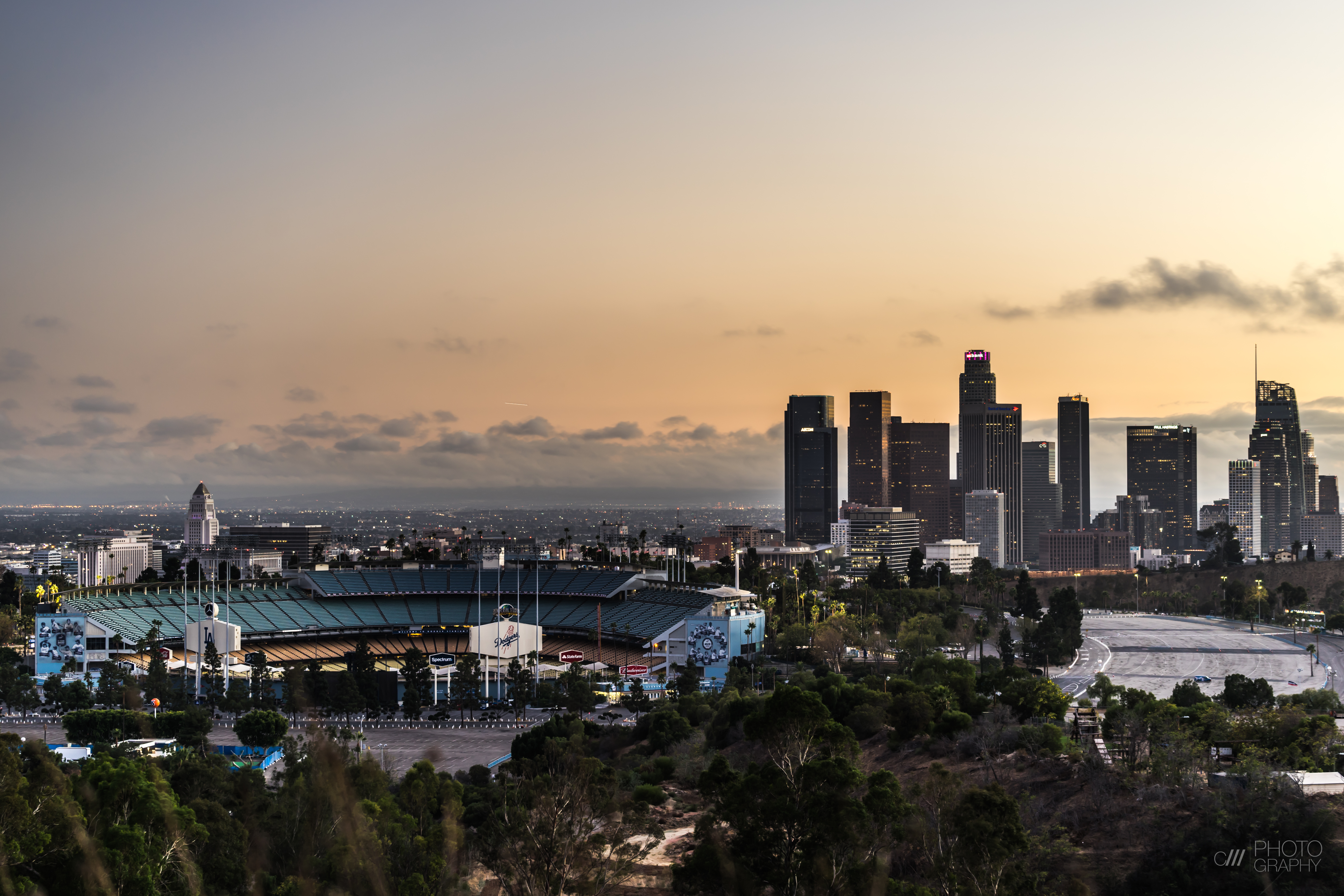
DTLA with Dodger Stadium in the foreground.

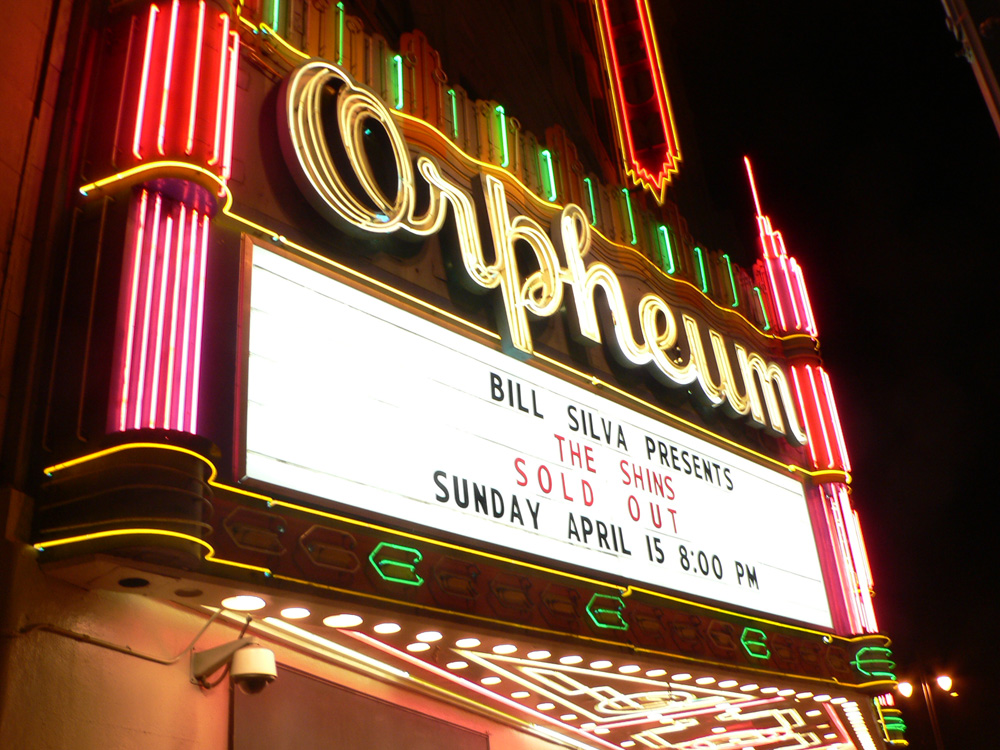
The Orpheum Theatre in 2007.

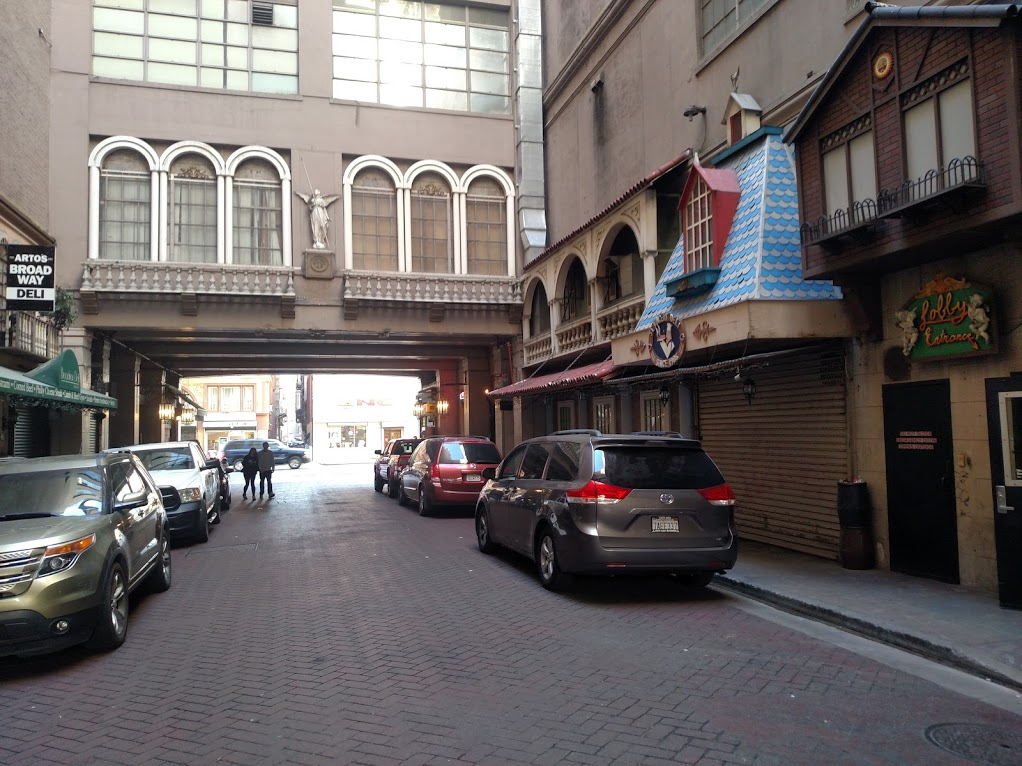
St. Vincent Court in 2017. European-style decorations date to 1957.

The 2000 U.S. census found that just 27,849 residents lived in the 5.84 square miles of downtown—or 4,770 people per square mile, among the lowest densities for the city of Los Angeles but about average for the county. The Southern California Association of Governments estimates that downtown's daytime population is 207,440. The population increased to 34,811 by 2008, according to city estimates. By the end of 2019, the population of the district had grown to 85,000 residents, and 7,956 residential units were under construction. The median age for residents was 39, considered old for the city and the county.

Downtown Los Angeles is almost evenly balanced among the four major racial and ethnic groups—Asian Americans (23%), African Americans (22%), Latinos (25%) and non-Hispanic whites (26%)—according to an analysis of 2010 census data made by Loyola Marymount University researchers.

A study of the 2000 census showed that downtown was the second–most diverse neighborhood in Los Angeles, its diversity index being 0.743, outrated only by Mid-Wilshire. The ethnic breakdown in 2000 was Latinos, 36.7%; blacks, 22.3%; Asians, 21.3%; whites, 16.2%, and others, 3.5%. Mexico (44.7%) and Korea (17%) were the most common places of birth for the 41.9% of the residents who were born abroad, about the same ratio as in the city as a whole.

The median household income in 2008 dollars was $15,003, considered low for both the city and the county. The percentage of households earning $20,000 or less (57.4%) was the highest in Los Angeles County, followed by University Park (56.6%) and Chinatown (53.6%). The average household size of 1.6 people was relatively low. Renters occupied 93.4% of the housing units, and home or apartment owners the rest.

In 2000, there were 2,400 military veterans living downtown, or 9.7% of the population, considered a high rate for the city but average for the county overall.

In 2010, census data concluded that 40,227 people lived in downtown Los Angeles.

In 2013, a study by Downtown Center Business Improvement District showed that of the 52,400 people resided in downtown Los Angeles, the demographic breakdown was 52.7% Caucasian, 20.1% Asian, 17.0% Latino, and 6.2% African-American; 52.9% female, 47.1% male; and 74.8% of residents were between the ages of 23–44. The median age for residents was 34. The median household income was $98,700. The median household size was 1.8. In terms of educational attainment, 80.1% of residents had completed at least 4 years of college. The study was a self-selecting sample of 8,841 respondents across the DTLA area. It was not a "census" but rather a comprehensive survey of Downtown LA consumers.

An additional study by the Downtown Center Business Improvement District showed that by 2017 the population reached 67,324. In early 2020 the population was estimated to have exceeded 80,000 at the end of 2019.

== Public transportation ==
=== Local and regional service ===
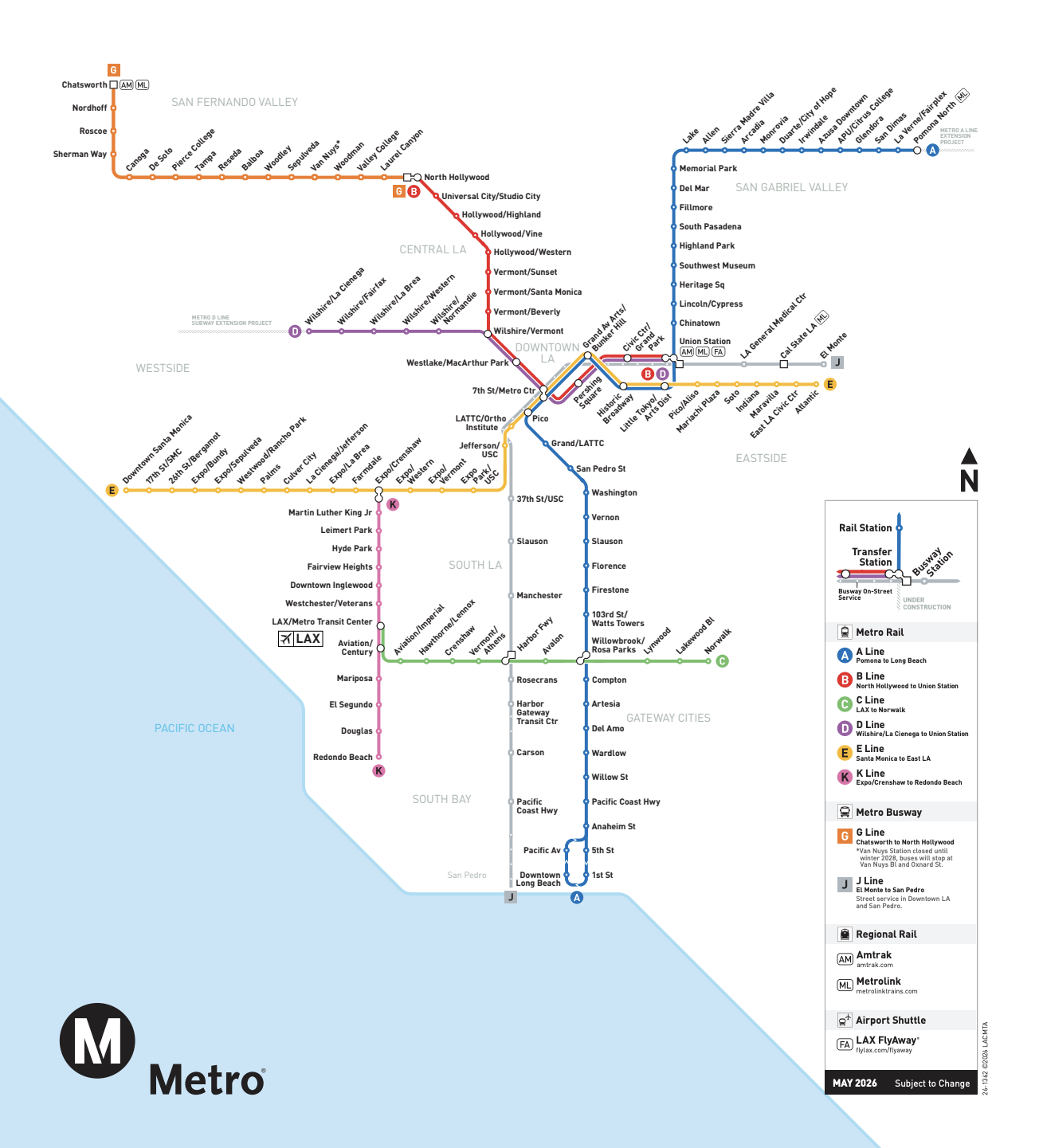
Current Los Angeles Metro Rail map showing rail and rapid transit lines.

Downtown Los Angeles is the center of the region's growing rail and bus transit system, with six commuter lines operated by Metrolink, as well as four of the six urban rail transit lines operated by Los Angeles County Metropolitan Transportation Authority (Metro), which also operates local and regional bus service.

Major Metro stations in the district include Union Station, Civic Center/Grand Park station, Pershing Square station, 7th Street/Metro Center station, Pico station, Little Tokyo/Arts District station, Historic Broadway station, and Grand Avenue Arts/Bunker Hill station.

- The Los Angeles Metro Rail system has four rail lines that serve downtown Los Angeles: the A Line, B Line, D Line, and E Line.
- The Metro J Line bus rapid transit service connects San Pedro and El Monte, with through service at street level through the downtown area.
- Metro operates an extensive bus network, including Metro Local, Metro Express commuter lines, and Metro Rapid buses with signal priority and limited stops.
- Los Angeles Department of Transportation operates seven local DASH shuttle routes downtown on weekdays: DASH A, B, C, D, E and F.

In addition to Metro and LADOT, other transit agencies in Los Angeles County, such as AVTA, Big Blue Bus, Foothill Transit, Montebello Bus Lines, Santa Clarita Transit, and Torrance Transit serve Downtown Los Angeles, with Foothill Transit's Silver Streak bus rapid transit connecting Montclair in San Bernardino County to Downtown.

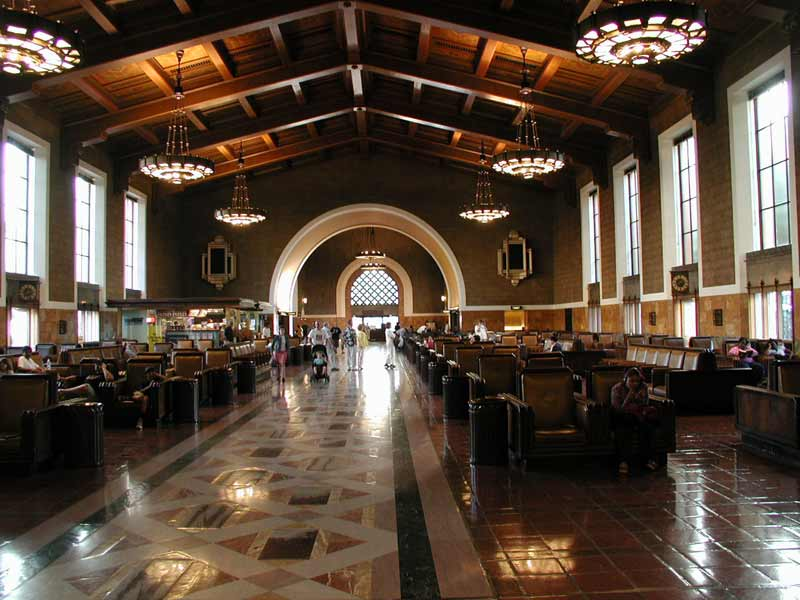
Union Station main passenger concourse.

=== Amtrak ===
Amtrak operates intercity passenger train service on five routes through Los Angeles Union Station: the Coast Starlight, Pacific Surfliner, Southwest Chief, Sunset Limited, and Texas Eagle. Additionally, dedicated Amtrak buses connect Union Station to all Gold Runner trains in Bakersfield.

=== Greyhound/Flixbus ===
Greyhound Lines operates from Union Station, and FlixBus operates from a parking lot across the street from Union Station.

=== Service to Los Angeles International Airport ===
Los Angeles World Airports operates a direct shuttle, LAX FlyAway Bus, every 30–60 minutes between Union Station and Los Angeles International Airport.

=== Transit expansions ===
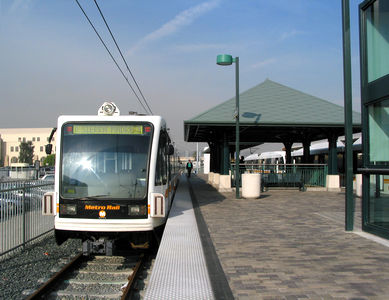
Metro A Line light rail at Union Station.

- The Metro E Line was built in two phases and completed in 2016. The first phase of the project connected 7th Street/Metro Center Station downtown with Culver City via the former Pacific Electric Railway Santa Monica Air Line right-of-way. The second phase extended the line to Santa Monica. The E Line shares tracks with the Metro A Line north of Washington Boulevard, and shares the Pico Station, 7th Street/Metro Center Station, Grand Avenue Arts/Bunker Hill station, Historic Broadway station, and Little Tokyo/Arts District station with the A Line.
- The Regional Connector Transit Corridor connected the A, E, and L Lines between the Little Tokyo/Arts District and 7th Street/Metro Center stations which opened on June 16, 2023. This had the A and E Lines take over different parts of the L Line, which was promptly discontinued.
- A westward extension of the D Line is currently under construction, connecting Downtown with Beverly Hills, Century City, and Westwood.
- Union Station is set to be a major stop on the under-construction California High-Speed Rail system, though it will not be a part of the project's Initial Operating Segment. The project would connect Northern and Southern California via the San Joaquin Valley, with service averaging 220 miles per hour (350 km/h).
- Work is planned to bring streetcar-style trolley service to downtown Los Angeles via Broadway, connecting the L.A. Live development with the Grand Avenue cultural corridor and Bunker Hill.
- The Southeast Gateway Line (formerly the West Santa Ana Branch Transit Corridor) is a planned light rail line, mostly following the Pacific Electric's historic West Santa Ana Branch, connecting Downtown Los Angeles to the city of Artesia, along with other cities in southeastern Los Angeles County.

== Parks and open space ==
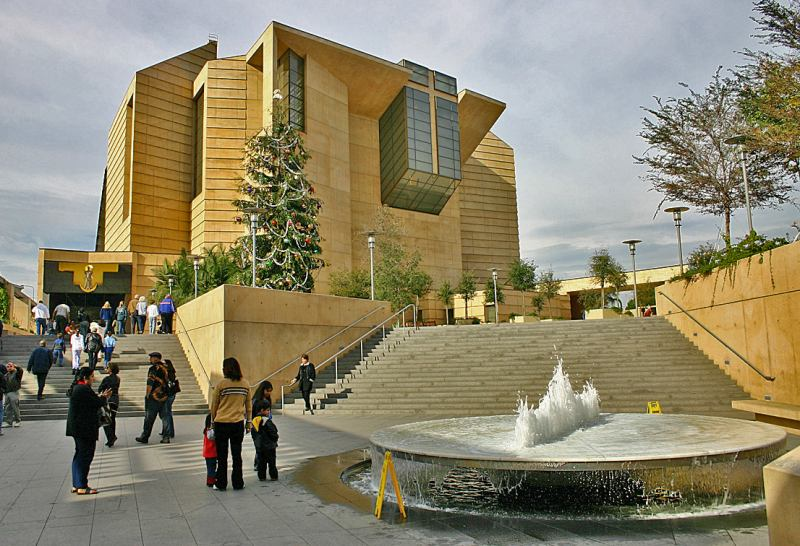
Cathedral of Our Lady of the Angels located adjacent to Los Angeles City Hall.

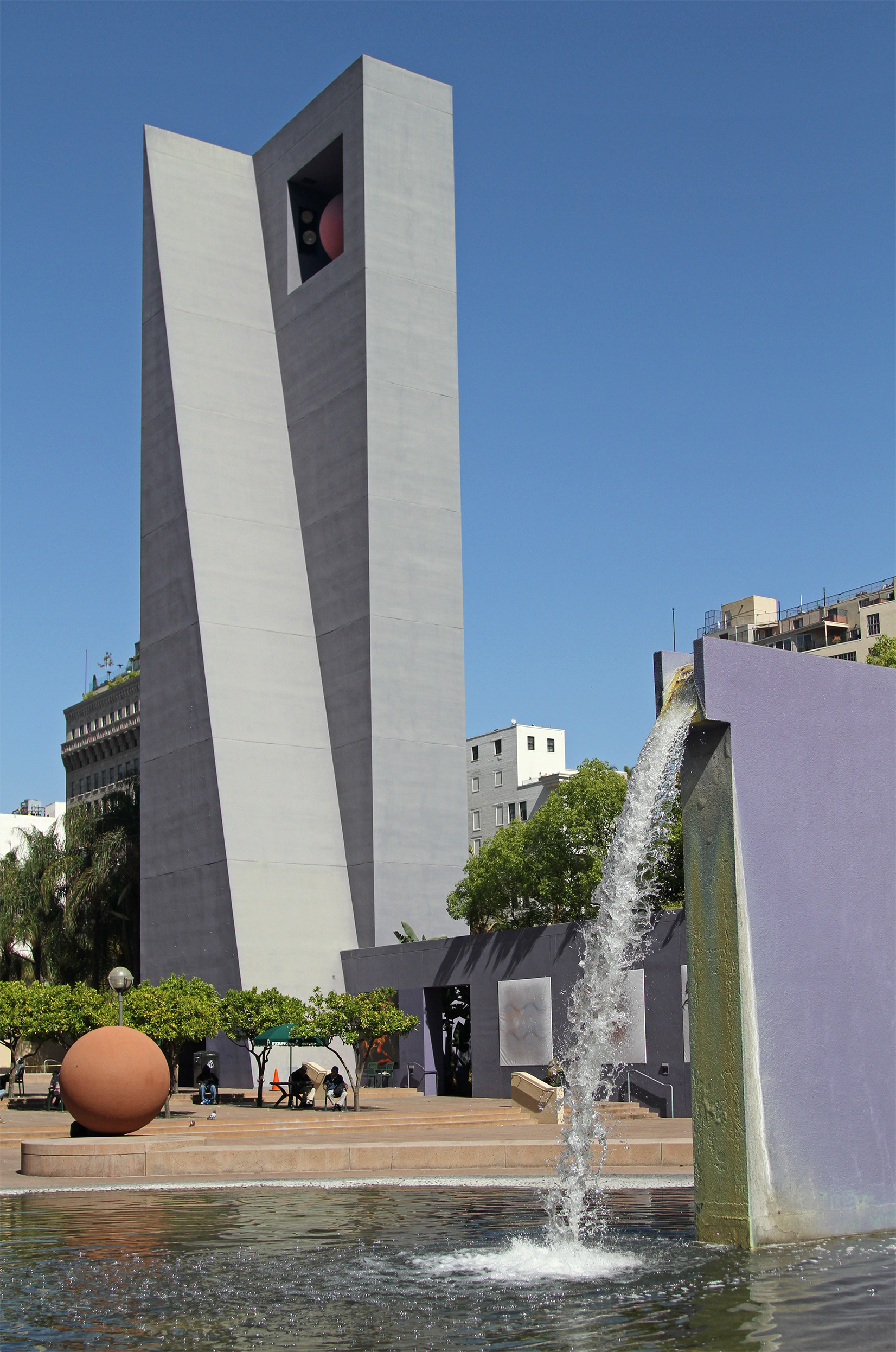
Pershing Square in 2012.

Downtown Los Angeles is home to several public parks, plazas, gardens and other open space:

- Los Angeles Plaza
- Olvera Street
- El Pueblo de Los Ángeles Historical Monument
- Cathedral of Our Lady of the Angels meditation garden and olive garden (park)
- Biddy Mason Park
- Grand Park
- Maguire Gardens
- Pershing Square
- Los Angeles City Hall South Lawn
- Los Angeles Police Department's Police Administration Building South Lawn
- Los Angeles State Historic Park
- Union Station gardens
- Walt Disney Concert Hall Community Park
- The Water Court at California Plaza, an outdoor performance and dining space with water features, fountains, shaded seating areas and an amphitheater.
- Japanese Garden and plaza at the Little Tokyo Cultural and Community Center Plaza
- Japanese Garden at the Kyoto Grand Hotel and Gardens
- Garden at Bank of America Plaza

Several future park proposals for the district make use of public-private partnerships between developers and the city of Los Angeles, including a public park at the proposed Nikkei Center development in Little Tokyo; a 1-acre (4,000 m^{2}) park at the Medallion development in the Historic Core; and a pocket park at the Wilshire Grand Hotel replacement project, currently under construction.

Additionally, the city recently completed a new park located on the 400 block of South Spring Street in the Historic Core neighborhood.

== Skyline ==
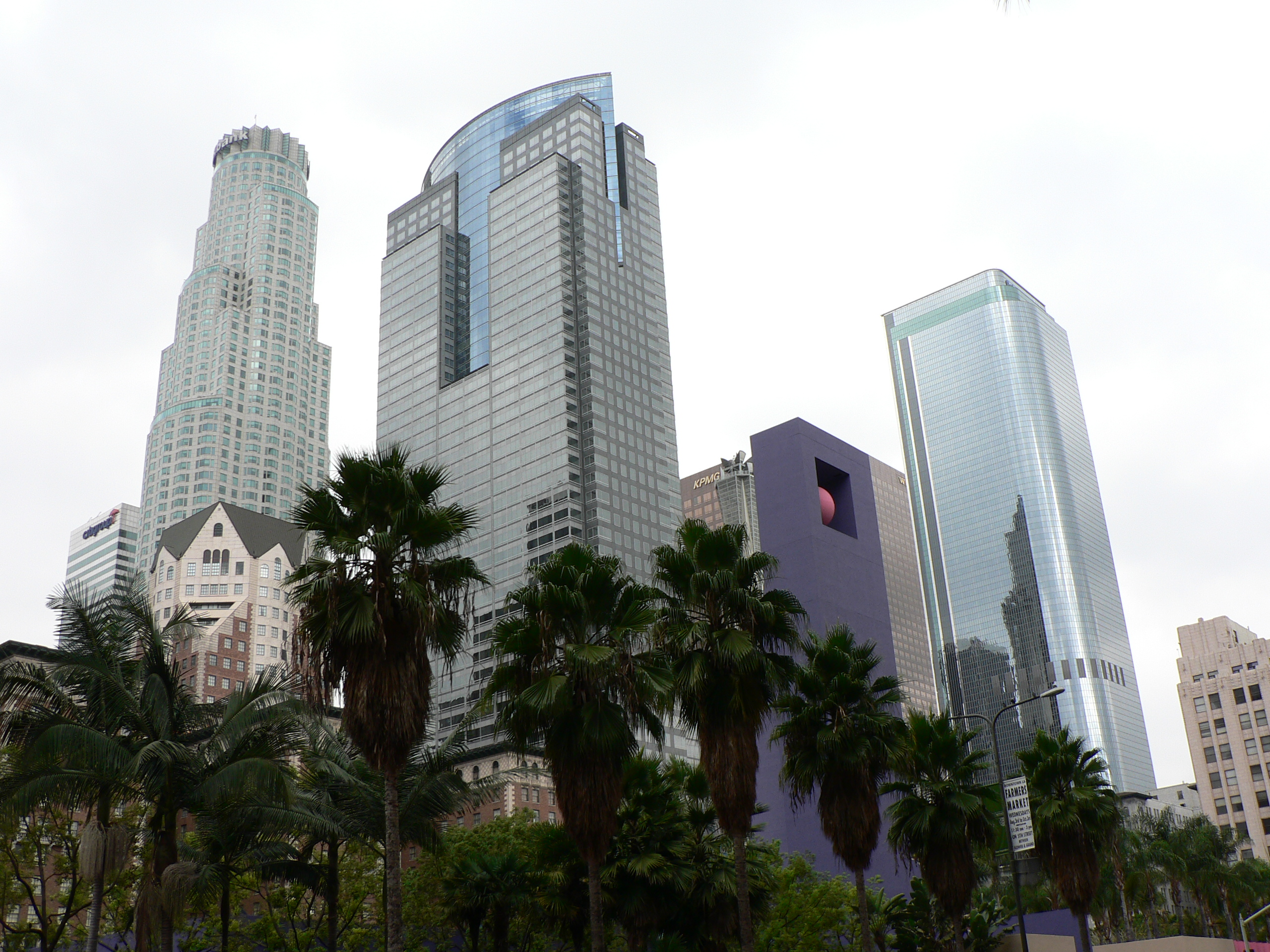
The modern skyline of Los Angeles resulted from the termination of severe height restrictions in 1957.

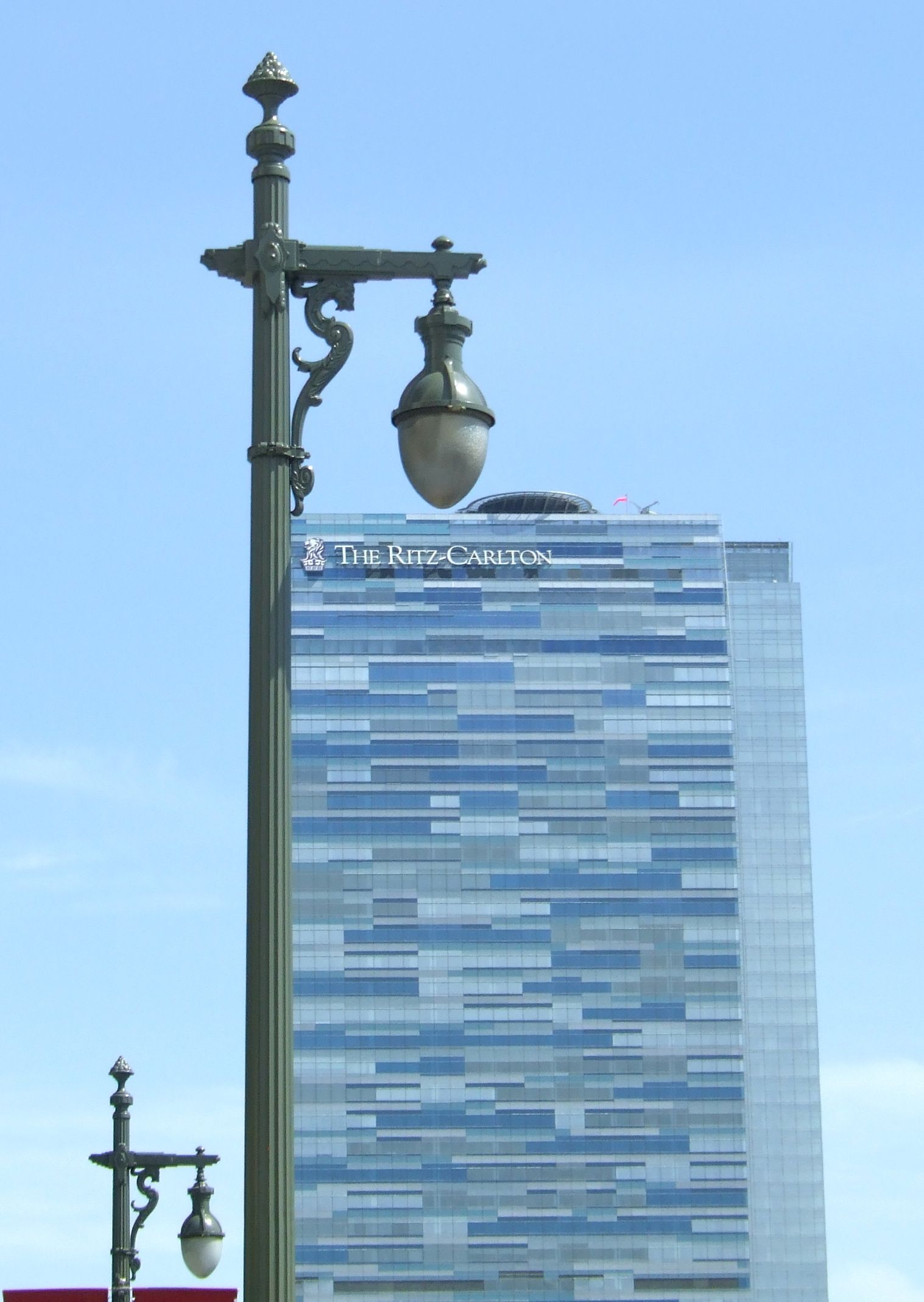
Ritz-Carlton Hotel, with distinctive street lamps in foreground, 2012.

Despite its relative decentralization and comparatively new high-rises (until 1958, the city did not permit any structures taller than the 27-story City Hall building), Los Angeles has one of the largest skylines in the United States, and its development has continued in recent years.

The skyline has seen rapid growth due to improvements in seismic design standards, which has made certain building types highly earthquake-resistant. Many of the new skyscrapers contain a housing or hotel component.

Some current and upcoming examples of skyscraper construction include:

- 705 Ninth Street, a 35-story residential tower, was completed in 2009.
- 717 Olympic, a 26-story residential tower, was completed in mid-2008.
- 888 Olive, a 32-story apartment tower by Vancouver-based Omni Group, opened in 2015.
- Concerto, a 28-story residential tower, was completed in early 2009. A second phase (Tower II) is currently under construction.
- The Grand Avenue Project, designed by architect Frank Gehry, is a multi-phase project on four parcels. It includes a 39-story hotel tower at the corner of First Street and Grand Avenue and a civic park.
- L.A. Live, a multi-phased dining, entertainment and hotel development that includes a Ritz-Carlton and JW Marriott Hotel hybrid as well as Ritz-Carlton-branded condominiums, was completed in February 2010.
- Marriott International completed a 24-story Courtyard and Residence Inn tower near L.A. Live, which opened in July 2014, and plans to build a 20+ story Renaissance Hotel to open in 2016.
- Metropolis, a mixed-use four-tower project (60, 50, 38, and 19 stories) at Francisco and Ninth streets, is currently under construction.
- South, a three-tower complex called Elleven, Luma, and Evo, spans the block from 11th Street and Grand Avenue to 12th Street and Grand Avenue, and was completed in phases ending in early 2009.
- The Wilshire Grand Tower redevelopment, a 900-room hotel and office project built in 2017, is the tallest tower west of the Mississippi River, at 1,100 feet (340 m).
- Figueroa Centre, a 975-foot residential and hotel tower proposed across from The Original Pantry restaurant on the Figueroa Corridor. The tower proposed will become the third tallest building in Los Angeles when completed.
- Angels Landing, a proposed super tall tower at 1020 ft. Currently in the funding stage. Approved by the city council in 2017.

=== Building height limits: 1904–1957 ===
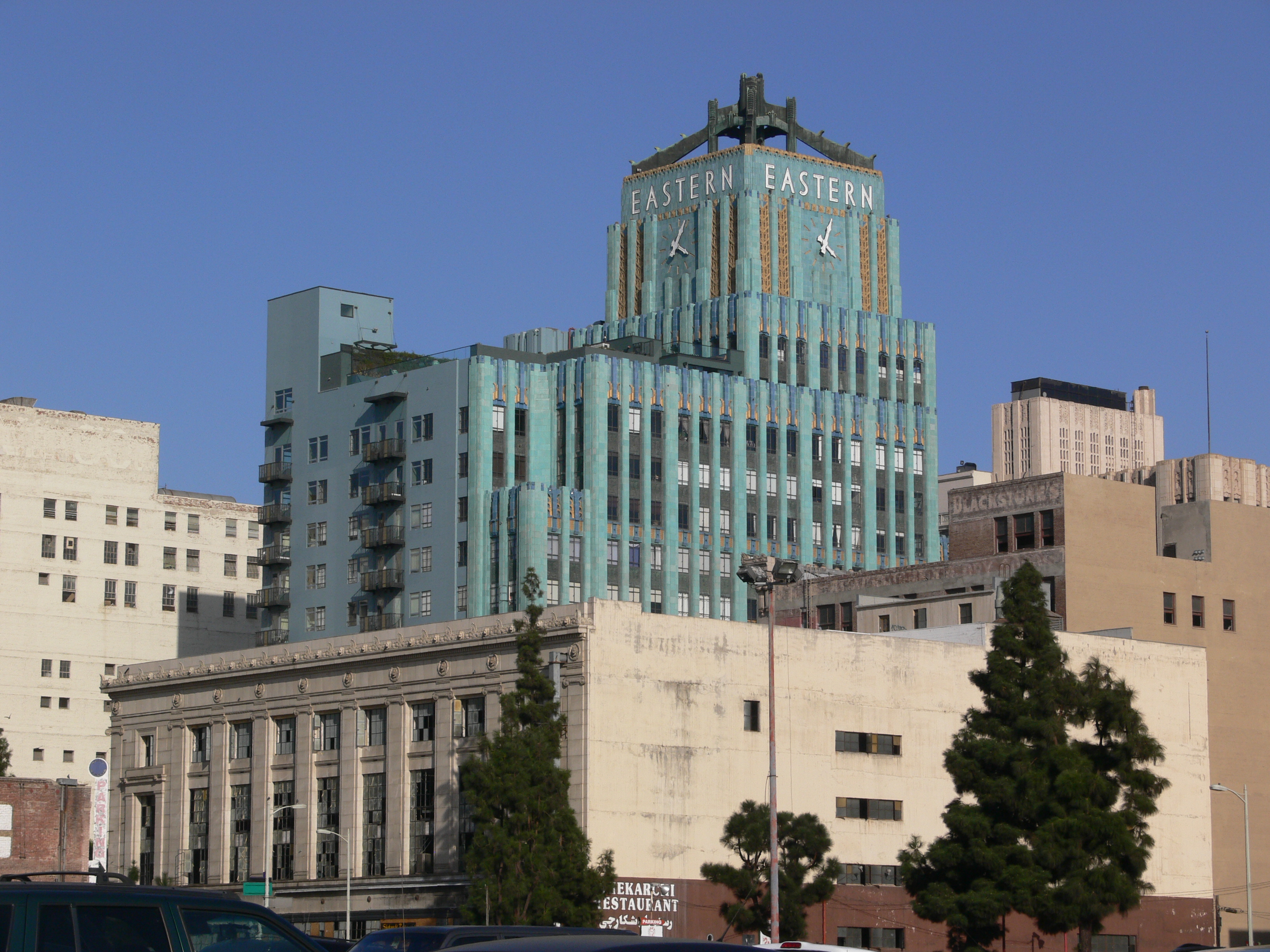
The Eastern Columbia Building: the Entrance to the Historic Core and the "Jewel of Downtown".

The first height limit ordinance in Los Angeles was enacted following the completion of the 13-story Continental Building, located at the southeast corner of Fourth and Spring streets. The purpose of the height limit was to limit the density of the city. There was great hostility to skyscrapers in many cities in these years, mainly due to the congestion they could bring to the streets, and height limit ordinances were a common way of dealing with the problem. In 1911, the city passed an updated height limit ordinance, establishing a specific limit of 150 feet (46 m). Exceptions were granted for decorative towers such as those later built on the Eastern Columbia Building and United Artists Theatre, as well as the now-demolished Richfield Tower.

=== Flat Roof Ordinance ===
The pattern of buildings in Los Angeles to feature flat rooftops was the result of a 1974 fire ordinance which required all tall buildings in the city to include rooftop helipads in response to the devastating 1974 Joelma Fire in Sao Paulo, Brazil, in which helicopters were used to effect rescues from the flat rooftop of the building. The Wilshire Grand Center was the first building granted an exception by the Los Angeles City Fire Department in 2014. However, as the building was under construction, L.A. City Council removed the flat roof ordinance as of 2015.

== Government and infrastructure ==
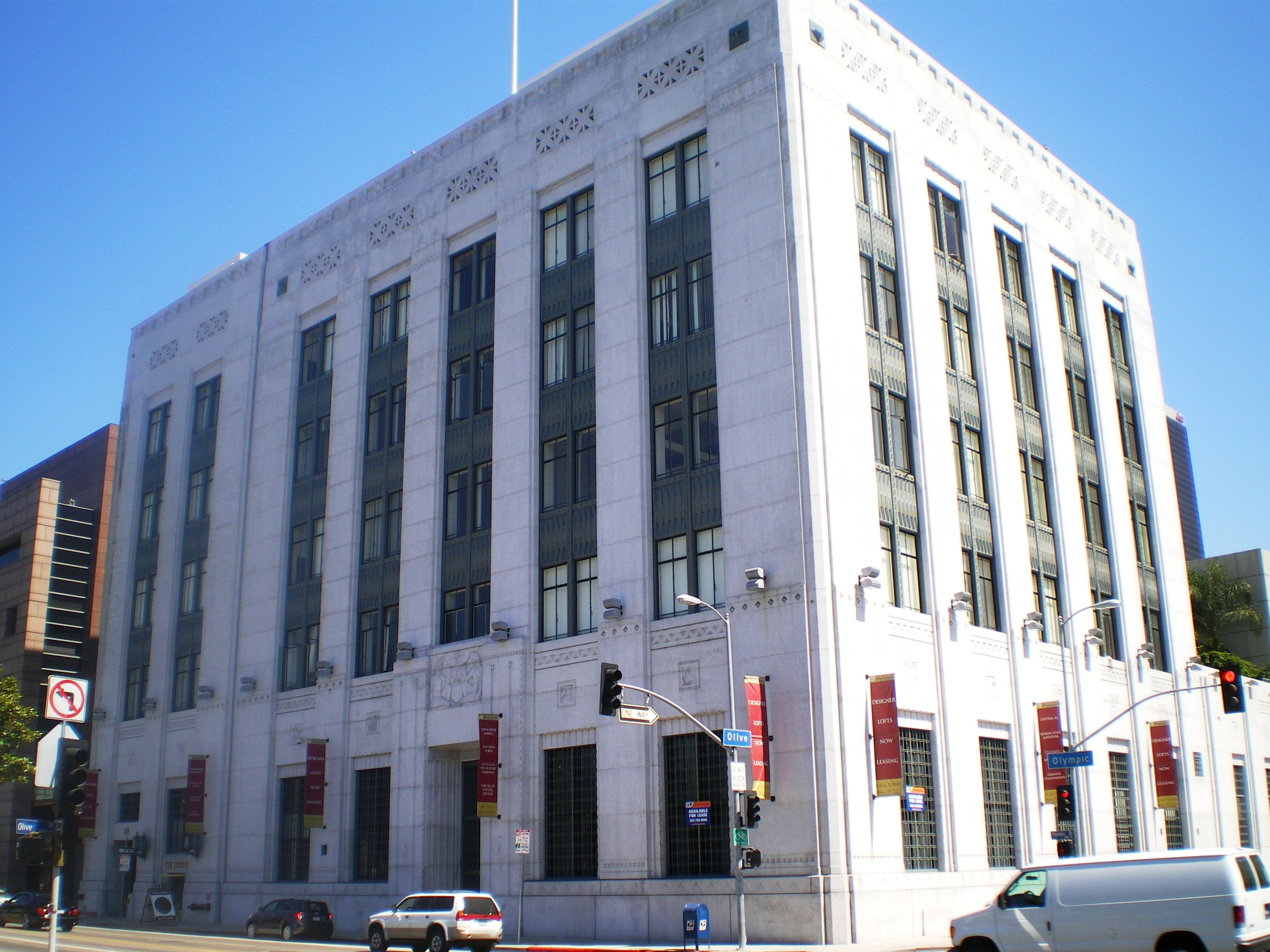
Federal Reserve Bank of San Francisco, Los Angeles Branch. This building is now loft apartments.

The Los Angeles County Department of Health Services operates the Central Health Center in downtown Los Angeles.

The Southern California Liaison of the California Department of Education has its office in the Ronald Reagan State Building in downtown Los Angeles.

The Federal Reserve Bank of San Francisco, Los Angeles Branch is located in downtown Los Angeles.

== Economy ==
DTLA is a node in the tech economy that extends beyond Silicon Beach. A venture capital firm counted 78 tech-oriented firms in DTLA in 2015. This included mobile apps, hardware, digital media and clean-tech companies plus co-working spaces, start-up incubators, and other related businesses.

The Arts District has become a popular spot for companies seeking out something different from typical modern offices. The central location is accessible from various parts of the Los Angeles Basin. The cultural life has also made the area attractive to young tech employees. Two Bit Circus is the only amusement park located in the area.

Anschutz Entertainment Group has its corporate headquarters in downtown Los Angeles. BYD Company, a Chinese technology firm, has its North American headquarters in downtown Los Angeles.

The Last Bookstore is an independent bookstore founded in 2005 by Josh Spencer, that was called California's largest new and used bookstore by Conde Nast Traveler in 2019. Cathay Bank has its headquarters in the Los Angeles Chinatown.

== Education ==
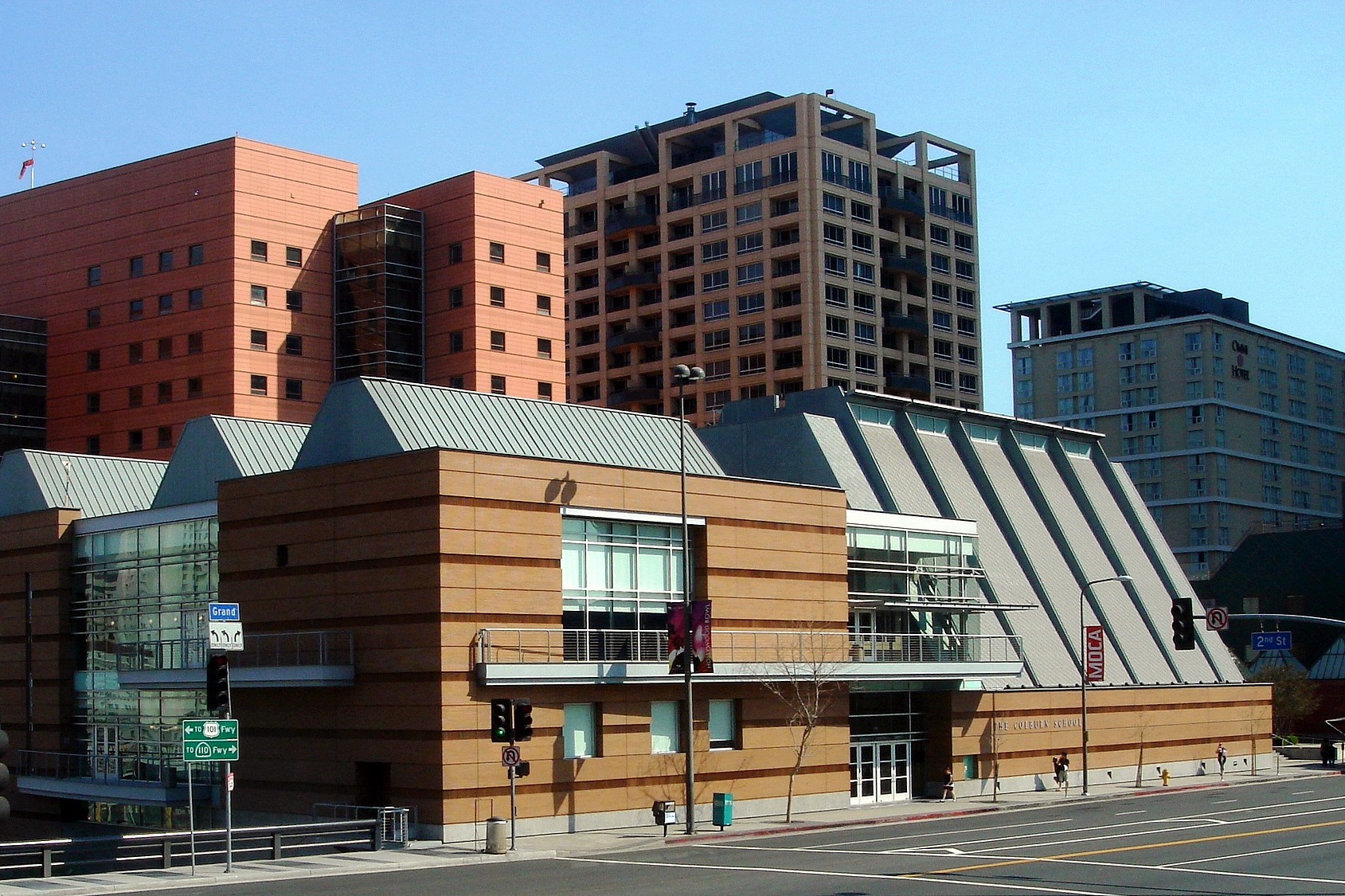
Colburn School on Grand Boulevard.

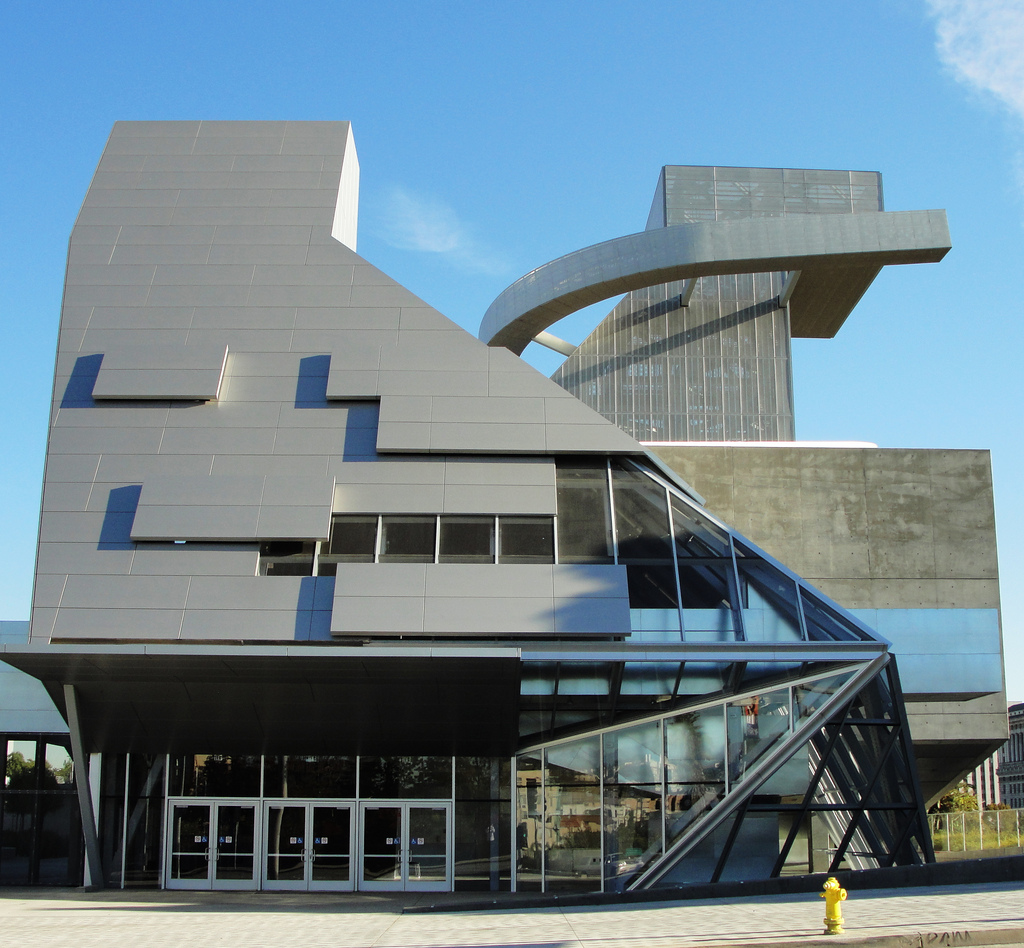
Ramon C. Cortines High School for the Visual and Performing Arts.

Downtown residents aged 25 and older holding a four-year degree amounted to 17.9% of the population in 2000, about average in the city and the county, but there was a high percentage of residents with less than a high school diploma.

These are the elementary or secondary schools within the neighborhood's boundaries:

- Ramon C. Cortines School of Visual and Performing Arts, LAUSD high school, 450 N. Grand Ave.
- Downtown Business High School, LAUSD alternative, 1081 W. Temple St.
- California Academy for Liberal Studies Early College High School, LAUSD charter, 700 Wilshire Blvd.
- Alliance Dr. Olga Mohan High School, LAUSD charter, 644 W. 17th St.
- Abram Friedman Occupational School, LAUSD adult education, 1646 S. Olive St.
- Metropolitan Continuation School, LAUSD, 727 S. Wilson St.
- Para Los Ninos Middle School, LAUSD charter, 1617 E. Seventh St.
- Jardin de la Infancia, LAUSD charter elementary, 307 E. Seventh St.
- Saint Malachy Catholic Elementary School, private, 1200 E. 81st St.
- Tri-C Community Day School, LAUSD, 716 E. 14th St.
- City of Angels School, LAUSD alternative school, 1449 S. San Pedro St. (formerly Central High School)
- San Pedro Street Elementary School, LAUSD, 1635 S. San Pedro St.
- Saint Turibius Elementary School, private, 1524 Essex St.
- American University Preparatory School, private, 345 S. Figueroa St.

The Fashion Institute of Design & Merchandising is at 800 S. Hope St., and the Colburn School for music and the performing arts is at 200 S. Grand Ave.

== Emergency services ==
=== Fire services ===
The Los Angeles Fire Department operates the following fire stations in downtown Los Angeles:

- Station 3 (Civic Center/Bunker Hill)
- Station 4 (Little Tokyo/Chinatown/Union Station/Olvera Street)
- Station 9 (Central City/Skid Row)
- Station 10 (Convention Center area)

=== Police services ===
The Los Angeles Police Department operates the Central area Community Police Station in downtown Los Angeles.

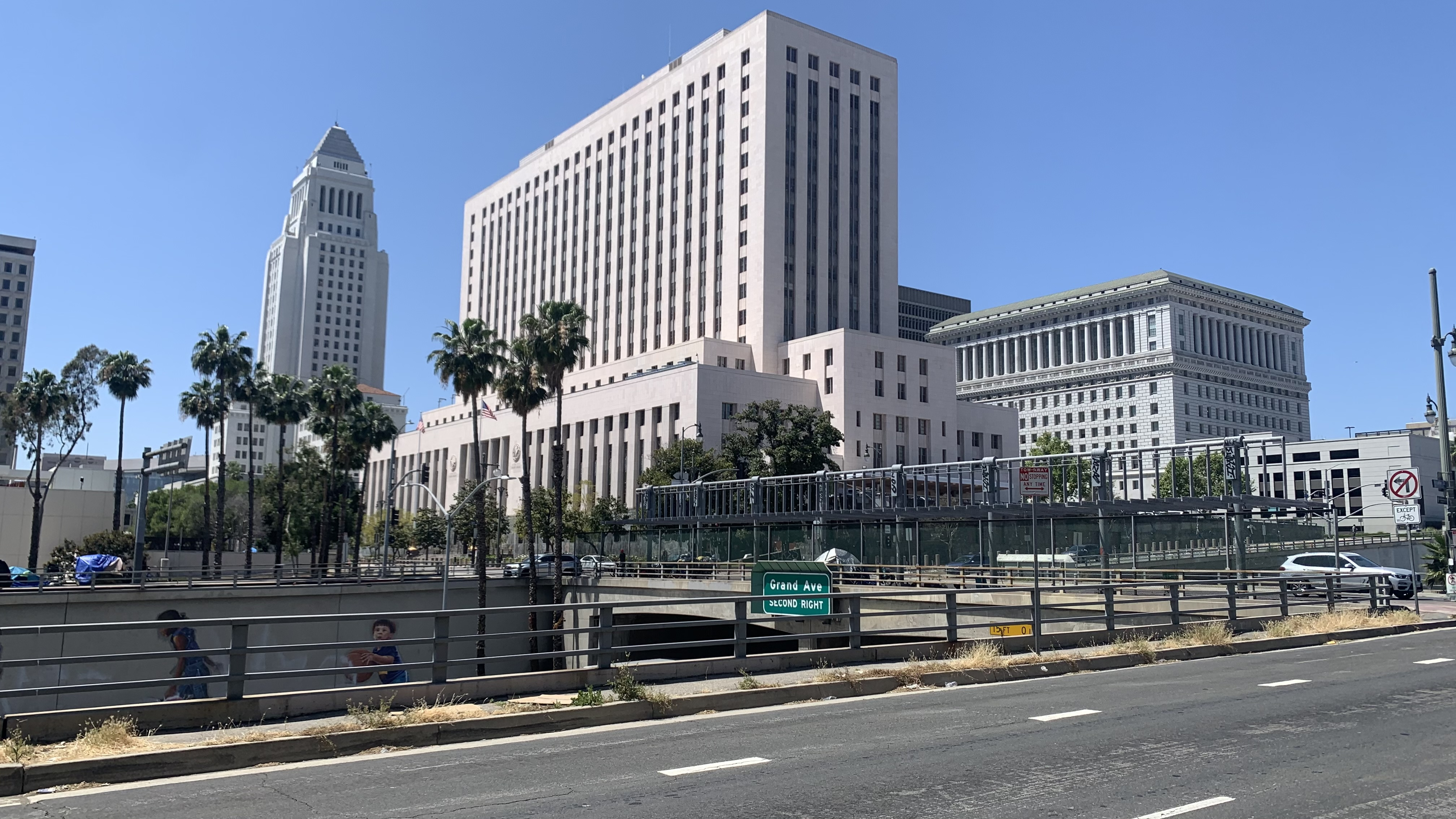
Los Angeles City Hall

== See also ==
- List of districts and neighborhoods in Los Angeles
- Central Business District, Los Angeles (1880–1899)
- LAMP Community
- List of tallest buildings in Los Angeles
- Los Angeles Downtown News
