= Los Angeles Flower District =

District of Los Angeles, California, United States

Coordinates: 34.040268°N 118.249826°W

The Flower District of Downtown Los Angeles is a six block floral marketplace, consisting of nearly 200 wholesale Flower dealers, located within the LA Fashion District. What started almost 100 years ago as a small flower mart near Santa Monica, California, has grown into the United States' largest wholesale flower district in its current downtown location. The Market is open very early in the morning, Monday–Saturday, and closes in the early afternoon. Every commercially available cut flower can be purchased there.

== History ==
In the early 1900s, Los Angeles area flower farmers drove their horse-drawn wagons to the downtown Los Angeles produce market to sell their flowers. In 1905, James Vawter, a prominent Santa Monica grower of carnations, established on Spring Street the first dedicated flower market. By 1910, the local Japanese American farmers (54 Issei, first generation Japanese) had organized a flower market, which they incorporated in January 1912. It became known as the Southern California Flower Market and was located for a time at 421 Wall Street.

Within a few years after, the European immigrants, who could not participate in the Japanese-American flower market, began to come together to offer their locally grown flowers for sale to florists and nursery owners. They organized around 1917 and incorporated in January 1921 as the American Florists' Exchange dba Los Angeles Flower Market. Their first market was on Winston Street between Fourth and Fifth streets.

Eventually, both markets relocated to larger quarters in the 700 block of South Wall Street in Los Angeles, where they operate today as the core of the country's largest flower district. Since those early days, both markets have expanded and modernized and organized together as the Los Angeles Flower District. Several storefront businesses on Wall Street and San Julian Street are also included in the District. The District offers a "badge program" for member florists, event planners and others who qualify to purchase goods at wholesale prices which in 2009 included some 4,500 members.

In the 1990s and early 2000s, dozens of smaller flower malls and shops opened in downtown Los Angeles adjacent to the original Los Angeles Flower District and have since become associated with the area. The distant serves retail florists, event planners, and the general public, offering fresh flowers and floral supplied across a boundaries spanning from San Pedro Street west to Maple Street, and from Seventh Street south to Ninth Street. Its two original wholesale markets have operated for nearly a century, with tenant wholesalers supplying and shipping fresh flowers across the United States.

A prominent area here is the California Flower Mall. Inside are more than 45,000 square feet (4,200 m^{2}) of fresh cut flowers and potted plants. More than 50 vendors provide floral industry professionals and the general public with exotic blooms from all corners of the earth.

The flower district has made plans to renovate and expand in its business. The plan is to build a 15-story building next to the warehouses where the flower markets are held in now. It would be the southern half of the property, where maple street and 7th street lie. The 15-story building would include 323 residential units. That would take up the top 12 stories and the rest would be for office space, retail space, wholesale market space and restaurants. The project is said to finish in 2019.(need citation)

Market Structure and Operations

The Los Angeles Flower District is made up of two main markets, which are: the original Los Angeles Flower Market and the Southern California Flower Market. Both markets are located across from each other on Wall Street. Together they form a larger center where flowers are sold to both businesses and to the public. This market has been an important part of Los Angeles for over 100 years and is set up to serve different types of buyers.

Market Structure

The Market is made up of small independent vendors working in the same space. Most of these vendors are family- owned and operated, and many have been there for many years.This creates a strong sense of community, while each vendor runs their business in their own way. Because of this, prices, products, and quality can be different at each stall, so buyers often compare options before choosing what they want.

Each vendor specializes in different products. Some vendors sell fresh flowers and greenery from California farms, and other vendors transport their flowers from different countries, such as:

- Mexico
- Colombia
- Ecuador

and many other countries. Others sell supplies like ribbons, vases, and tools. Some vendors even specialize in plants like succulents and cacti. In addition, Many vendors also work closely with florists, event planners, and designers across California and beyond, which helps connect the market to the overall flower industry.

Market Operations

The Market opens early and works differently for professionals and the general public. Professional buyers, like florists and event planners, can apply for a badge membership to enter the market during special wholesale hours, usually starting as early as 4:00 a.m.This early start is important because it allows professionals to choose the freshest and highest-quality flowers before the public arrives and items begin to sell out. It also allows them to buy in large amounts for events, shops, or resale.

The general public is allowed to enter later in the morning, usually around 8:00 a.m. on weekdays and 6:00 a.m. on Saturdays. There is a small entrance fee for the public, about $2 per person on weekdays and $1 on Saturdays, and this fee usually allows access to both major markets. By the time the public enters, some of the best products may already be sold, but there is still a wide variety available at lower prices than most flower shops.

Hours of Operation

- Monday – Thursday: 5:00 AM – 12:00 PM.
- Friday: 5:00 AM – 2:00 PM.
- Saturday: 5:00 AM (or 6:00 AM for the public) – 2:00 PM.
- Sunday: Closed.
- Individual vendors may close at their own discretion, sometimes earlier than the official market close time

Pricing and payments

Flowers are sold in bulk, which makes them much cheaper than regular flower shops, often about 50% to 70% less. For example, large quantities like five dozen roses can cost as little as $25. These lower prices are possible because buyers are purchasing directly from growers or wholesalers, without the extra cost added by retail stores. Prices can also vary between vendors depending on quality, type of flower, and supply, so buyers often walk around the market to compare options before making a purchase.

Most vendors accept credit cards, but some may charge extra fees for smaller transactions, especially under a certain amount. Because of this, many buyers prefer to use cash for quick and easy purchases.This allows all types of buyers to save money while still selecting high-quality flowers.

Logistics and Facilities

The market offers a rooftop parking lot for visitors, along with nearby parking areas that usually cost between $10 and $12. In addition to selling flowers at their stalls, some vendors also offer delivery services within Los Angeles and nearby areas, depending on the vendor, making it easier for customers to transport large orders.

== Bibliography ==
- Hirahara, Naomi. A Scent of Flowers Southern California Flower Growers (2004)
- Ridgway, Peggi and Works, Jan. Sending Flowers to America: Stories of The Los Angeles Flower Market and the People Who Built an American Floral Industry American Florists' Exchange (2008)
- Time out. 2024. " A shopper's guide to the Original L.A Flower Market." Time Pot los Angeles
- L.A. Flower District full of surprises. (2023). https://www.aol.com/news/l-flower-district-full-surprises-110029441.html
- Original Los Angeles Flower Market. (n.d.). https://www.originallaflowermarket.com/services
- Los Angeles Flower Market. (n.d.). https://lifeinwanderlust.com/los-angeles-flower-market/
