= L.A. Downtown Industrial District =

Business improvement district in Los Angeles, CA, US

Los Angeles Downtown Industrial District LADID
- Business improvement district
- Los Angeles Downtown Industrial District Business Improvement District
- Interactive map of Los Angeles Downtown Industrial District
- Coordinates: 34.057°N 118.238°W
- Country: United States of America
- State: California
- County: Los Angeles
- City: Los Angeles
- Council district: 14
- City center: Downtown
- Established: 1998
- Current management district plan: January 1, 2015 – December 31, 2021
- Founder: Central City East Association

Government
  - Type: Supervisory committee
  - Administrator: Central City East Association
  - Advisors: Downtown Industrial District BID Board of Directors
  - Directors: List of Directors: Mark Shinbane (Chair) Ore-Cal/Fisherman's Outlet; Matt Klein (Vice-Chair) HBK Investments; Ernie Doizaki (Secretary) Kansas Marine; Dilip Bhavnani (Treasurer) Legendary Developments, LLC; Andrew J. Bales Union Rescue Mission; Drew Bauer Young’s Market Company; Richard Gardner L.A. Wholesale Produce Market; Carolyn Leslie Atlas Capital/ROW DTLA; Howard Klein Ocean Beauty Seafood; Larry Rauch Los Angeles Cold Storage; Bob Smiland Inner City Arts
  - Managers: List of Managers: Estela Lopez Executive Director; Jesse Ramirez Operations Manager

Area
  - Total: 0.332 sq mi (.861 km^{2})
- Elevation: 253 ft (77 m)

Population (2019)
  - Total: 5,343
  - Ethnicity: Ethnic groups: 18% White; 46% Black; 25% Hispanic or Latino; 1% Native American; 8% Asian; 3% Mixed race
- ZIP Codes: 90013, 90014, 90021
- Website: www.industrialdistrictla.com

The Los Angeles Downtown Industrial District (LADID) is manufacturing and wholesale district of downtown Los Angeles, California, that was established as a property-based business improvement district (BID) in 1998 by the Central City East Association (CCEA). The district spans 46 blocks, covers 600 properties, and is the historic home of seafood, produce, flowers, and a variety of products daily shipped in and out of Los Angeles by air, rail, and sea. The LADID hosts the Los Angeles Wholesale Produce Market, the second largest produce market in the United States.

== Boundaries ==
The LADID is bounded on the West by San Pedro Street from 8th Street to 7th Street and both sides of San Pedro from 7th Street to Third Street, on the North by Third Street, on the East by Alameda Street, and on the South by Olympic Boulevard and 8th Street.

=== Zones ===
The business improvement district (BID) is divided into two distinct benefits zones. Zone One is composed of small parcels with buildings with street fronts that typically house multiple businesses. Zone Two consists of larger parcels with buildings that are set back, are completely fenced, and house only one business.

Zone One parcels are predominantly occupied by small wholesale businesses with some retail uses that primarily serve the needs of the immediate neighborhood within the District. Zone One also contains a number of non-profit social service providers. Zone One has the highest pedestrian counts and the highest demand for clean and safe services based on data from over 10 years of operation. The west boundary for zone one is the west boundary for the District. The north boundary is 3rd Street. The east boundary is Central Avenue and the south boundary is 8th Street.

Zone Two is predominantly wholesale, industrial and market uses, including the Los Angeles Wholesale Produce Market, which have very little pedestrian traffic and operate predominantly during the night hours. Zone Two has a much lower historical demand for clean and safe services based on data from over 10 years of operations. The west boundary for Zone Two is Central Avenue. The north boundary is 3rd Street. The east boundary is Alameda Street and the south boundary is Olympic Boulevard.

== Business improvement district ==
The Los Angeles Downtown Industrial District Business Improvement District (BID) serves as the principal advocate for property owners, businesses, employees and residents of the LADID. Services, activities, and programs that are not provided by the City of Los Angeles are paid for through a special assessment which is charged to all members within the district in order to equitably distribute the benefits received and the costs incurred to provide public safety patrols, street cleaning and maintenance services as well as economic development and communications.

The BID is administered by the Central City East Association (CCEA), overseen by a board of directors composed of property owners, and managed on a day-to-day basis by a two-person management team.

== Homeless population ==
The LADID is host to one of the largest stable populations of homeless people in the United States. As such, the neighborhood has become the region's center for services for the homeless, the mentally ill, and persons looking to find emergency shelter and assistance. More than two dozen historic hotels within the district have been converted into low-income housing.

== Development ==
The LADID makes up 10% of Downtown Los Angeles’s total geography and 1 to 2% of Downtown's employment. Although neighboring districts have experienced a housing boom, the LADID has remained relatively unchanged because. Some critics say it is because the LADID is zoned almost entirely for light industrial uses. Other point to the neighborhood's rising homeless population. Between 2002 and 2016, the LADID experienced 9% growth in comparison to 17% in neighboring districts.
