= California Academy for Liberal Studies Early College High =

High school in California, United States

Coordinates: 34.137304°N 118.187526°W

Information
- School type: Charter high school
- School district: Los Angeles Unified School District
- NCES District ID: 0622710
- Website: www.puccalsechs.org

California Academy for Liberal Studies Early College High (CALS) is an alternative charter high school of the Los Angeles Unified School District located in Downtown Los Angeles.
