= Toy District, Los Angeles =

Neighborhood in the United States

Coordinates: 34.04625°N 118.244565°W

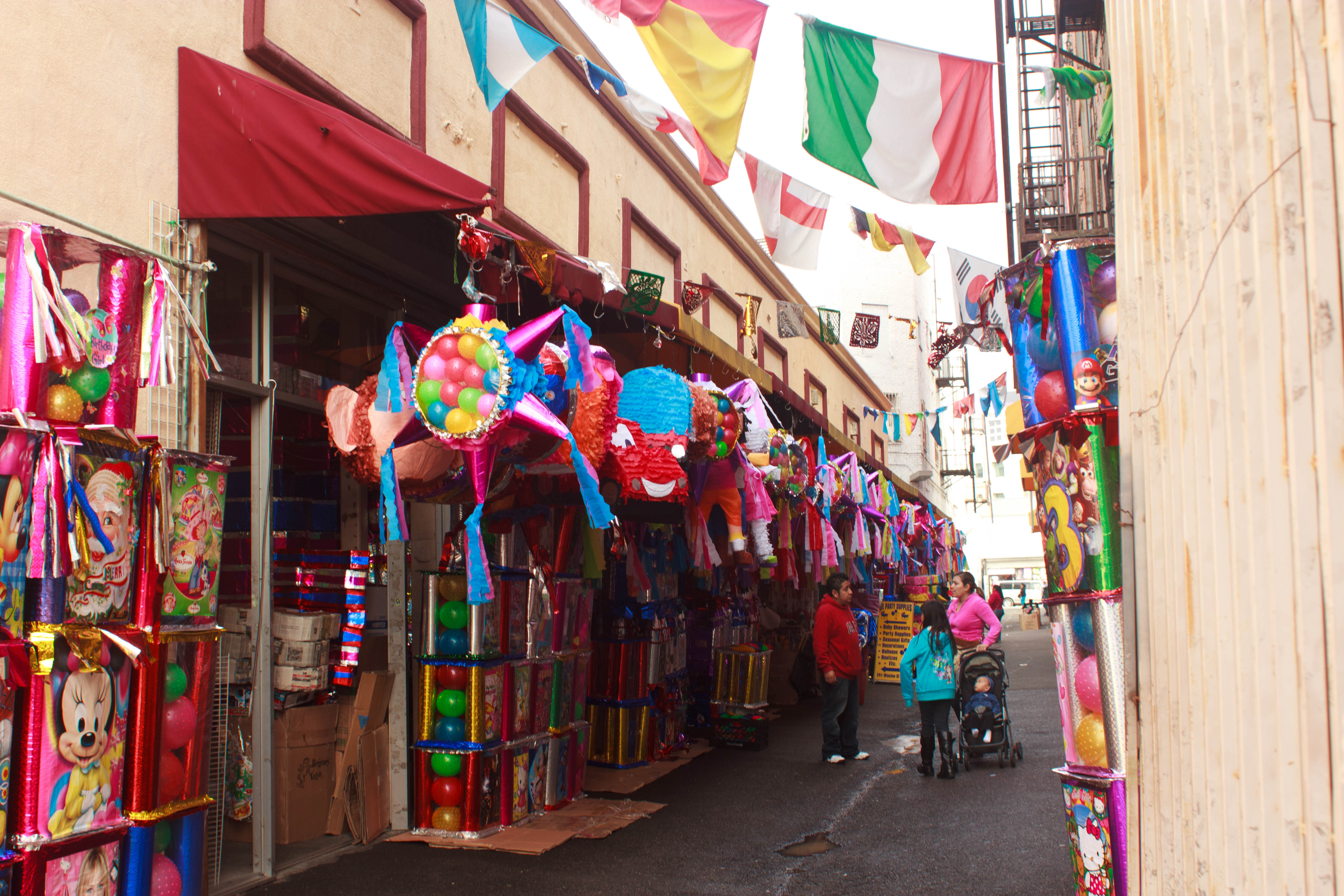
A store in the Toy District

The Toy District is a 12-block area in eastern Downtown Los Angeles, bounded by Los Angeles Street on the west, Third and Fifth streets on the north and south and San Pedro Street on the east. It is a multilingual, multicultural area comprising one- and two-story buildings often painted in pastel shades; it is home to roughly five hundred toy- and electronics-related businesses.

== Beginnings ==
Before the arrival of the first toy merchants, the area was considered to be simply a part of Skid Row—an impoverished area habituated by the homeless—and one contemporary account described it as lying between Third, Fifth and Main streets and the Los Angeles River. Taiwanese and Vietnamese immigrants of Chinese descent opened up the first toy stores in the early 1980s, and at first these merchants sold toys only during holiday periods. Among them was the Woo family, and the most successful entrepreneur of that clan was Charles Woo, born in Hong Kong and settling in Los Angeles as a teenager in 1968. Woo was a physics student at UCLA when he took a summer off to help other family members launch ABC Toys, a wholesale business later operated by Shu Woo. By 1998 Woo and his family owned 10 Toy District buildings and a distribution company, Mega Toys, with $30 million in annual sales. Charles Woo was later considered to be the Toy District's "founding father." Woo said he built up the Toy District by encouraging other Asian-immigrant entrepreneurs who were buying toys from him to open their own businesses in the district.

== Business practices ==
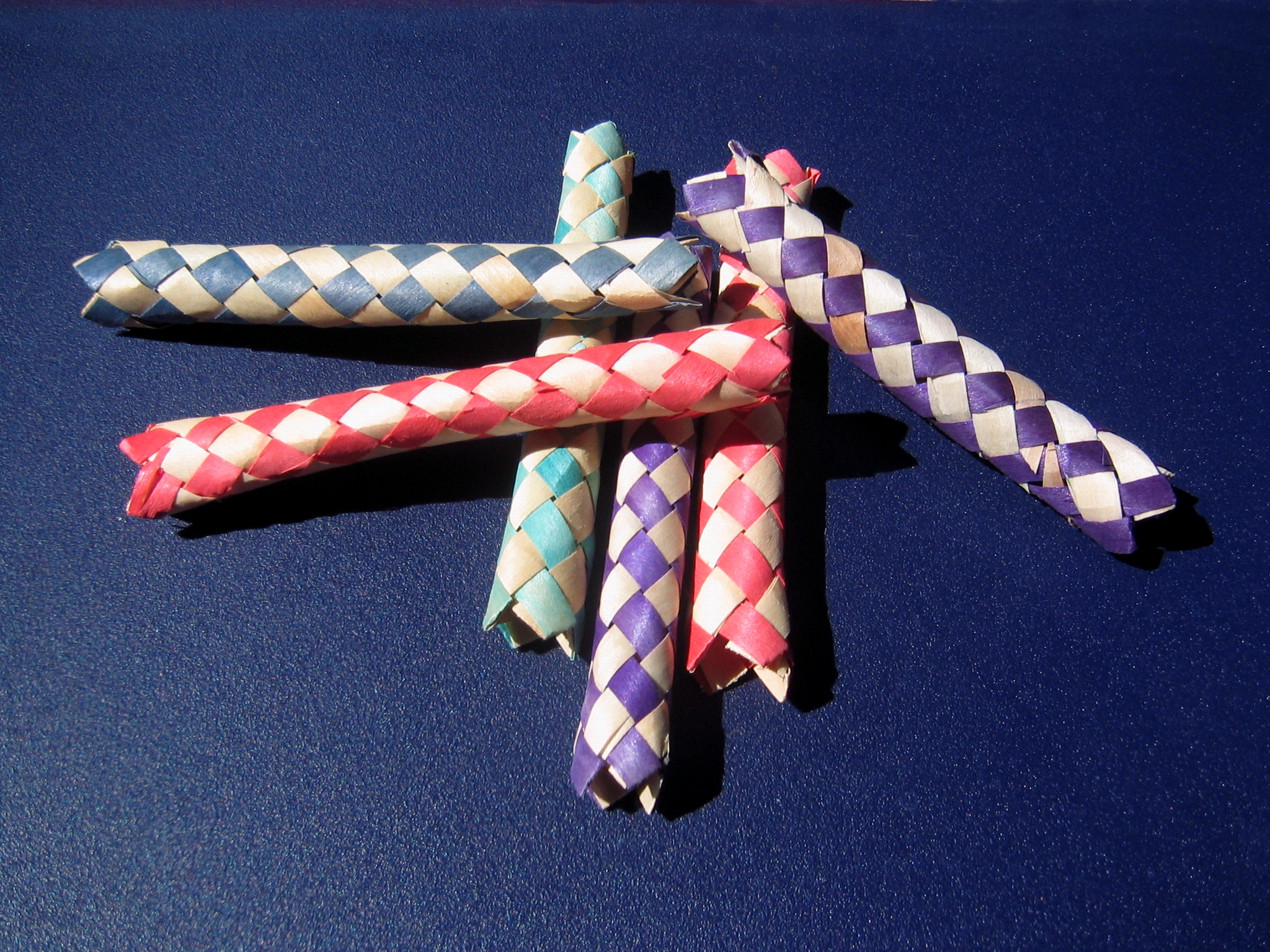
Finger-trap toys made in China

Predominantly a wholesale district for mid-range to low-end stores nationwide, the 12-block area is also popular with individual bargain hunters. About a thousand shops, stalls and curbside stands fill the bustling area, roughly bounded by 3rd Street on the north, San Pedro Street on the east, 5th Street on the south and Los Angeles Street on the west. Along with toys, the shops are filled with housewares, sporting goods, silk flowers and clothing imported from such places as Thailand and Pakistan as well as China. Ninety percent of the stores sell at wholesale prices. Charles Woo said that he built up volume in his business by halving the 40 to 50 percent markup typically sought by traditional small toy wholesalers.

The growth of the toy industry in this area helped revive these economically stricken areas of Downtown Los Angeles, and the process gave birth to the Toy District, which by 2003 was home to hundreds of resellers of mostly Asian-made toys and other goods, with more than a billion dollars in sales each year. Los Angeles County has emerged as the gateway to most of the toys sold in U.S. retail stores and increasingly abroad. More than five hundred companies make up the toy industry in the county – not only in the Toy District – and they are mainly wholesalers who import dolls, radio-controlled cars and other goods from Pacific Rim countries. They generally are small and employ just a few workers each.

== Business Improvement District ==
Around 1998, a business improvement district, or BID, was established by property owners in the neighborhood to clean streets and improve security, but by 2009 there was widespread discontent among the owners about the role of the district, which had been paying for trash pickup and security patrols through special assessments on the properties. The Central City East Association, the nonprofit organization that managed the district, had been trying to focus the district's dwindling funds on its contractual duties (i.e. dealing with pedestrian trash as opposed to commercial trash), as a result of which the street-trash problem grew worse. The district went out of business in 2009 when property owners defeated a proposal to renew its mandate. On January 1, 2010, the Central City East Association stopped providing trash removal and other services in the Toy District. Even before that date, cardboard boxes and other garbage began to pile up on neighborhood streets. Workers from the BID had regularly hauled more than five tons of garbage daily from the area. Many landlords cited the poor economy and a dip in the rental market, saying they could not afford the BID's annual dues, which ranged from a few hundred to more than one hundred thousand dollars.

Several factors contributed to the trash problem. Stores received large shipments of merchandise, and some business owners dumped the packing materials on the streets at the end of each day, assuming the city would take care of it. Additionally, many of the district's cramped shops were housed in larger, subdivided storefronts and they did not have ready access to alleys or other areas large enough to hold dumpsters.

== Homelessness and vandalism ==
The district is also home to a portion of downtown's homeless population, with homeless people sleeping at night on the sidewalks. By 2010 street lights had been stripped of salable metal parts and entire blocks were left in darkness.
