= Figueroa Centre =

Coordinates: 34.045889°N 118.264036°W

- Location within the Los Angeles metropolitan area

General information
- Status: Proposed
- Type: Hotels, Residential, Office and Retail
- Location: 925 S. Figueroa St. Los Angeles, California

Height
- Architectural: 975 ft (297 m)

Technical details
- Floor count: 66

Design and construction
- Architect: CallisonRTKL
- Developer: Regalian; Armbruster Goldsmith & Delvac

Figueroa Centre is a 66-story, 975 ft (297 m) Modernist hotel/residential skyscraper proposed for 925 S. Figueroa Street in downtown Los Angeles, California. Designed by CallisonRTKL. The rectangular steel-clad building design is similar to LA's Aon Center tower. If completed, it will be the third tallest building in Los Angeles, and the 4th tallest in California.

The building will be designed for hotel use, 200 condominiums and 94,000 sq of commercial space facing Figueroa Street. Figueroa Centre will be a 1/4 mile from Crypto.com Arena and L.A. Live.

== See also ==
- List of tallest buildings in Los Angeles
