= Los Angeles streets, 41–266 =

This article covers streets in Los Angeles, California between and including 41st Street and 250th Street. Major streets have their own linked articles; minor streets are discussed here.

These streets run parallel to each other, roughly east–west.

Streets change from west to east (for instance West 1st Street to East 1st Street) at Main Street.

Many of the elementary schools in South Los Angeles bear names of numbered streets.

== 44th Street ==
44th Street has been renamed Vernon Avenue, and is served by Metro Local: line 105. Two Metro Rail stations:

- Leimert Park (K Line)
- Vernon (A Line)

== 58th Street ==
West of Western Avenue, Slauson Avenue takes the place of 58th Street.

== 63rd Street ==
63rd Street east of Van Ness Avenue is named Gage Avenue, where it is an east-west thoroughfare. Gage Avenue terminates at Slauson Avenue in Commerce.

== 72nd Street ==
see Florence Avenue

== 79th Street ==
79th Street has been renamed Nadeau Street east of Central Avenue.

== 86th Street ==
see Manchester Avenue, and Firestone Boulevard.

== 96th Street ==
This street is a secondary street in South Los Angeles. Portions of it are renamed "Colden Avenue". It is also the site of the future SkyLink and the LAX/Metro Transit Center on Aviation Boulevard and 96th Street.

== 98th Street ==
98th Street is notable for being bisected by Jesse Owens Memorial Park for most of its length.

== 100th Street ==
100th Street runs between Central Avenue and Compton Avenue. Most of Century Boulevard takes the place of 100th Street with the exception of the aforementioned short "numbered" street.

== 103rd Street ==
Briefly served by Metro Local line 117. One Metro A Line station:

- 103rd Street/Watts Towers

== 108th Street ==
108th Street is a major street in South Los Angeles, and was formerly served by Line 119

== 114th Street ==
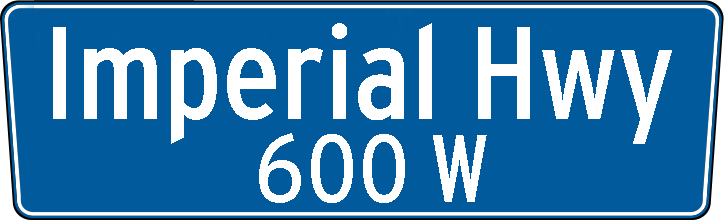
Imperial Highway

114th Street is also the Imperial Highway.

== 120th Street ==
120th Street is a major street in Hawthorne, Athens, Harbor Gateway, and Willowbrook. It runs from Aviation Boulevard to Van Ness Avenue, and then from Western Avenue to Wilmington Avenue. It is served by portions of Line 53, and was formerly served by Lines 126, 207 and 357. Between at the junction with Crenshaw Boulevard, the Dominguez Channel storm drain crosses underneath. Between Crenshaw Boulevard and Prairie Avenue the Hawthorne Municipal Airport is to the south, and the Boring Test Tunnel runs underneath the road.

== 128th Street ==
128th Street has been renamed El Segundo Boulevard.

== 135th Street ==
135th Street is a major street in Hawthorne, Gardena, Harbor Gateway, and Rosewood; it runs from Aviation Boulevard to McKinley Avenue. 135th Street turns into Sam Littleton Street in Compton(at McKinley Avenue) before changing back into 135th Street at Central Avenue. However, it is signed as W Stockwell Street. It was previously served by portions of Line 209.

== 143rd Street ==
143rd Street has been renamed Rosecrans Avenue. One J Line station:

- Rosecrans

One Metro K Line station within Douglas Street:

- Douglas

== 151st Street ==
151st Street has been renamed Compton Boulevard/Somerset Boulevard in the east and Marine Avenue in the west. Compton Boulevard/Somerset Boulevard carries Metro Local line 127. Marine Avenue carries portions of Metro Local line 215. Two Metro Rail stations:

- Redondo Beach (K Line)
- Compton (A Line)

== 158th Street ==
158th Street has been renamed Manhattan Beach Boulevard.

== 161st Street ==
161st Street has been renamed Alondra Boulevard east of Vermont Avenue and it is served by Metro Local lines 128 and 460.

== 174th Street ==
174th Street has been renamed Artesia Boulevard. One Metro A Line station:

- Artesia

== 203rd Street ==
203rd Street has been renamed Del Amo Boulevard. One Metro A Line station:

- Del Amo

== 217th Street ==
217th Street has been renamed Carson Street. Carson Street becomes Lincoln Avenue approximately 1.5 miles (2.4 km) east of Interstate 605 upon entering the city of Cypress and Orange County. Once east of State Route 55 in the city of Orange, Lincoln becomes Nohl Ranch Road. One J Line station:

- Carson

== 223rd Street ==
223rd Street is a major street in Carson and Harbor Gateway. It runs from Western Avenue to Alameda Street, where it becomes Wardlow Road upon entrance to Long Beach. One Metro A Line station:

- Wardlow

== 250th Street ==
250th Street, a major residential street in the city of Lomita, was originally named Arizona St. until 1933. The Lomita Railroad Museum is located on this street.

== 266th Street ==
266th Street is the highest numbered street in the system just one block north of Palos Verdes Drive North.

== See also ==
- Los Angeles streets, 1–10
- Los Angeles streets, 11–40
- Los Angeles avenues
- List of streets in Los Angeles
