= One-way pair =

Two separate corridors in opposite directions

A one-way pair, one-way couple, or couplet refers to that portion of a bi-directional traffic facility – such as a road, bus, streetcar, or light rail line – where its opposing flows exist as two independent and roughly parallel facilities.

== Description ==
In the context of roads, a one-way pair consists of two one-way streets whose flows combine on one or both ends into a single two-way street. The one-way streets may be separated by just a single block, such as in a grid network, or may be spaced further apart with intermediate parallel roads.

One use of a one-way pair is to increase the vehicular capacity of a major route through a developed area such as a central business district. If not carefully treated with other traffic calming features, the benefit in vehicular capacity is offset by a potential for increased road user deaths, in particular people walking and biking. A one-way pair can be created by converting segments of two-way streets into one-way streets, which allows lanes to be added without widening.It also allows easier creation of a green wave by adjusting traffic lights on the through route, because strict left turn phases are no longer required at each intersection.

On occasion, "couplet" has been applied specifically to the point where the one-way streets and the two-way street meet, rather than the paired one-way streets themselves.

Flows on a one-way pair may follow the traffic handedness convention of the locale, or may be switched. Following the convention allows a one-way pair to be more easily integrated into an existing network of two-way streets, as a single two-way street is effectively split into the two sides of the pair, as in the diagram below:

(rejoin)	(one-way pair)	(split)
	/ ← ← ← ← ← ← ← /
← ← ←	/ ← ← ← ← ← ← ← /	← ← ←
→ → →	/ → → → → → → → /	→ → →
	/ → → → → → → → /

== Criticism ==
International research has found that there are several disadvantages to one-way pairs including:

- they can lead to road users taking less care and travelling at increased speeds because of the expectation that they will not encounter opposing traffic
- they do not reduce traffic, it is simply transferred to other streets
- they are likely to increase travel distances for residents

The American Association of State Highway and Transportation Officials suggests converting two-way to one-way operation in situations where an urban street has too many pedestrian-vehicle conflicts.

One-way streets benefit drivers, but two-way streets benefit everyone else. They can improve air quality, safety for cyclists and pedestrians, and promote patronage of local businesses.

One-way streets are designed for moving cars quickly and efficiently. A 1981 report understood that one-way streets "can produce undesirably high speeds if they are long, straight and wide." An argument for one-way streets is that the "allocation of road space to moving traffic is less [than for two-way streets]", implicitly preserving vehicle capacity.

== Examples ==
=== Australia ===
The Sydney central business district features a number of one way pairs. One example is Pitt Street with Castlereagh Street. Pitt street carries only northbound traffic from Goulburn Street to Market Street. Castlreagh Street only carries southbound traffic on its entire length from Hunter Street to Hay Street. Trams once ran from Central station to Circular Quay along Pitt Street and back to Central station along Castlereigh, Bligh, Bent and Loftus Streets. Other examples are York and Clarence Streets between the Harbour Bridge and Town Hall, and King and Market Streets between Sussex and Elizabeth Streets.

In Redfern, Elizabeth Street is paired with Chalmers Street between Redfern Street and Eddy Avenue. Prior to the opening of the Eastern Distributor in 1999, Bourke and Crown Streets were paired between Woolloomooloo and Waterloo after which they were converted back to two-way streets. The paired roads from the Anzac Bridge through Ultimo, Chippendale, Redfern to Waterloo is known as the Southern Arterial Route.

In the Brisbane central business district, Ann Street is paired with Turbot Street and George Street with North Quay, the latter by the Brisbane River. In Southbank, Merivale Street is paired with Cordelia Street from Montague Road to Vulture Street. In East Brisbane, Vulture Street is paired with Stanley Street.

In the Hobart central business district a couplet of Davey Street and Macquarie Street traverse the length of the city centre. The Tasman Highway joins the pair at the northeastern end at an interchange with the Brooker Highway. This current alignment was implemented in 1987 to coincide with the completion of the Sheraton Hotel. It was originally intended that the couplet system would serve as a stop gap measure prior to the construction of a freeway in Hobart's Transportation study of 1965. Prior to this, all traffic in Hobart was two-way.

In 1965, the University of New South Wales Professor of Highway Engineering Dennis Orchard (D.F. Orchard) criticised organizations opposing one one-way paired roads in central Sydney. He stated while "their interests are very much bound up with those of the inhabitants at large", the "policies they are advocating are not necessarily right in the overall context and probably not even in their own."

=== Canada ===
Alberta Highway 2 is a one-way pair in southern Edmonton on Calgary Trail and Gateway Boulevard between 31 Avenue NW and Whitemud Drive. Alberta Highway 2 is also one-way pair through the towns of Fort Macleod (23 and 25 Streets; cosigned with Alberta Highway 3) and Nanton (20 and 21 Avenues). Alberta Highway 16 (Yellowhead Highway) is a one-way pair through the town of Edson (2nd & 4th Avenues).

British Columbia Highway 99 is a one-way pair in downtown Vancouver on Seymour and Howe Streets between the Granville Street Bridge and Georgia Street. British Columbia Highway 97 is a one-way pair through the community of Westbank in West Kelowna, following Main Street and Dobbin Road.

Saskatchewan Highway 1 (Trans-Canada Highway) splits into a functional one-way pair for 15 km (9 mi) between Uren and Ernfold, with the entire village of Ernfold being located between the eastbound and westbound lanes.

=== Japan ===
Japan National Route 340 travels through the central part of Hachinohe in Aomori Prefecture as a one-way pair between its northern terminus at an intersection with Japan National Route 45 and Aomori Prefecture Route 251.

=== United States ===
Interstate 78 travels along a one-way pair of surface streets, 12th Street and 14th Street, in Jersey City, New Jersey, between the end of the New Jersey Turnpike Newark Bay Extension and the Holland Tunnel, which leads into New York City, New York.

There are hundreds of one-way pairs among the streets and avenues of New York City. One example is Fifth Avenue with Madison Avenue. Others include First Avenue with Second Avenue; Third Avenue with Lexington Avenue; and Seventh Avenue with either Sixth Avenue or Eighth Avenue.

Two major streets in the city of Pittsburgh serve as a one-way pair; Forbes Avenue and Fifth Avenue. Both streets begin in Downtown near Point State Park before becoming a one-way pair just east of Market Square, with Forbes serving outbound traffic and Fifth serving inbound traffic, going through Uptown and Oakland before both streets end up with two-way traffic and diverge, with Fifth Avenue eventually terminating in Highland Park, while Forbes terminates in Wilkinsburg just outside the city limits. The mostly two-way Boulevard of the Allies parallels Forbes and Fifth for most of the time the two streets are a one-way pair.

The east side of Portland, Oregon, features a number of one-way pairs, both north–south and east–west, with the east–west pairs being associated with bridges; these all follow the usual flow convention – see Transportation in Portland, Oregon, for more details. By contrast, the Portland Transit Mall, which is a public transportation (bus and rail) corridor, has the opposite flow, with the westernmost component (6th Avenue) running north, with the eastern component (5th Avenue) running south.

There are a number of one-way pairs in Downtown Los Angeles, California. These include 3rd and 4th streets, 5th and 6th streets, 8th and 9th streets, 11th and 12th streets, and Main and Spring streets.

Levick Street and Robbins Street in Philadelphia are considered a one-way pair. The streets carry traffic to and from the Tacony-Palmyra Bridge through the Mayfair and Wissinoming neighborhoods. Between Frankford Avenue and Roosevelt Boulevard, the streets carry US 13 in their respective direction.

In Orlando, Florida, Princeton Street carries 4 miles of SR-438 near Interstate 4. Over a portion of that, Smith Street carries the westbound traffic. At Lake Lawsona, Mills Avenue splits into Jackson Street northbound and Thornton Avenue southbound.

In Virginia Beach, Virginia, the eastern end of Interstate 264 transitions to 21st and 22nd Street, each going in its respective direction.

== See also ==
- Directional running, the equivalent for rail transport
