= El Segundo =

El Segundo most often refers to El Segundo, California.

El Segundo may also refer to:

- El Segundo (horse)
- El Segundo blue butterfly
- El Segundo High School
- El Segundo Unified School District
- El Segundo (LACMTA station)
- El Segundo Boulevard
- El Segundo Freeway, name for Interstate 105 in California
