= Los Angeles Avenue =

Los Angeles Avenue may refer to:

- Los Angeles avenues, numbered streets in Northeast Los Angeles
- California State Route 118, which is called Los Angeles Avenue for part of its length
- Los Angeles Street, street in Los Angeles California
