= Toyota Sports Performance Center =

Sports venue in El Segundo, California

Coordinates: 33°55′18″N 118°23′17″W

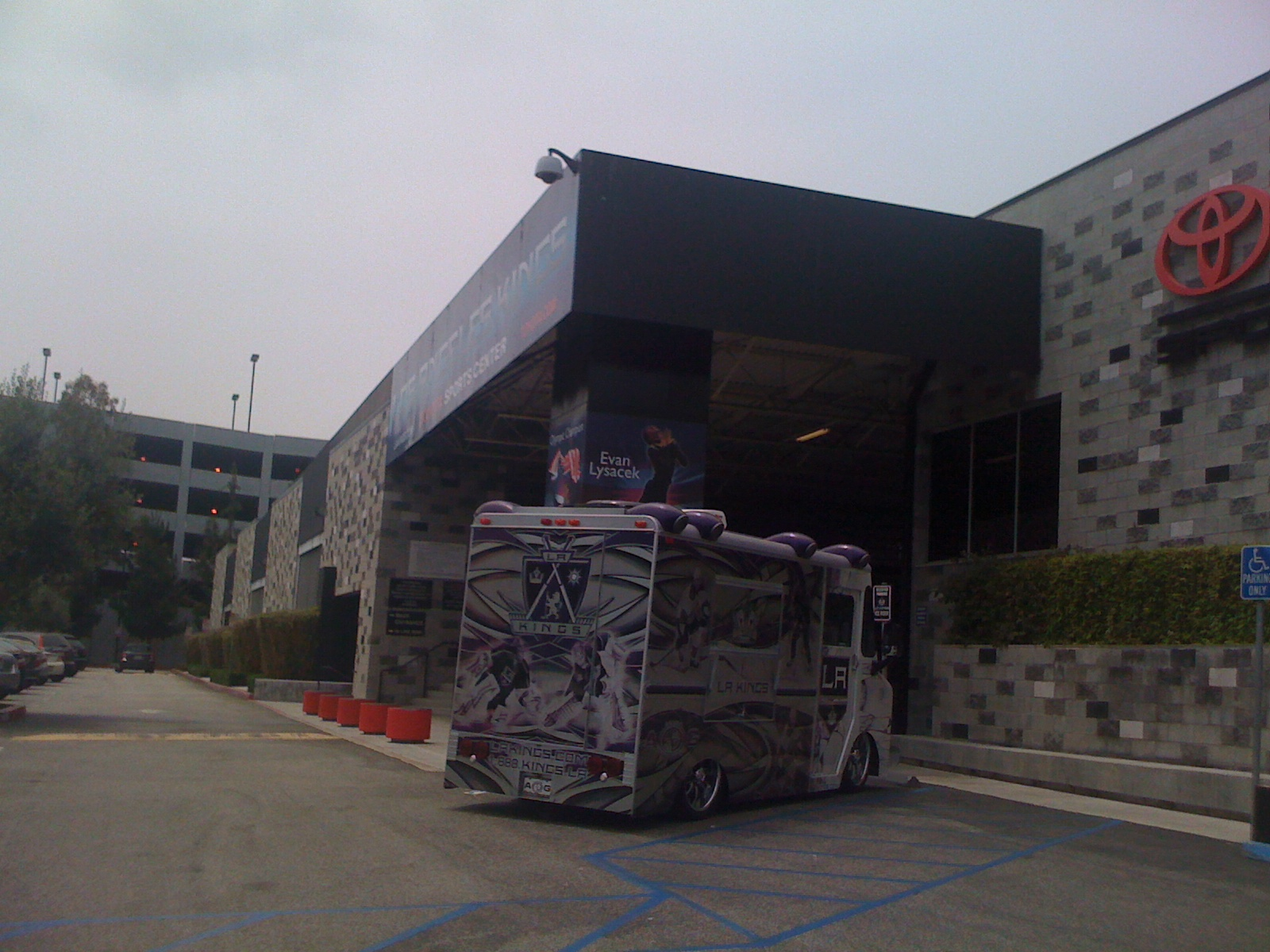
- Main Entry exterior from parking lot
- Interactive map of Toyota Sports Performance Center
- Former names: HealthSouth Training Center
- Address: 555 North Nash Street
- Location: El Segundo, California
- Owner: Anschutz Entertainment Group
- Operator: American Skating Entertainment Centers
- Public transit: Mariposa

Construction
- Opened: March 5, 2000
- Cost: $24 million
- Architect: Jon Drezner

Tenants
- Los Angeles Kings Practice Facility (NHL) (2000–present); Los Angeles Lakers Practice Facility (NBA) (2000–2017); Los Angeles Sparks Practice Facility (WNBA) (2000–2018); Los Angeles D-Fenders (NBA D-League) (2011–2017); Ontario Reign Practice Facility (AHL) (2015–present); Los Angeles Jr. Kings (SCAHA) (2003-present); El Segundo Strikers (Los Angeles Kings High School Hockey League) (2015-present)

The Toyota Sports Performance Center is a practice facility for the Los Angeles Kings, and the Ontario Reign, located on 555 North Nash Street in El Segundo, California. The $24 million, 135,000 square feet (12,500 m^{2}) facility broke ground on April 28, 1999, and officially opened on March 5, 2000.

The facility is located on the grounds of the Grand Avenue Corporate Center. The facility includes three public ice rinks, NHL size, Olympic size, and a smaller size ice rink (the smaller-sized rink was originally an inline and roller skating rink, and was turned into an ice rink, completed in September 2011), sports medicine (formerly the basketball court), and a restaurant. In addition, the property houses complete training facilities, including locker rooms and office space for the Kings and Lakers. The facility's three public ice rinks hosts several amateur and youth hockey leagues throughout the year. One million guests pass through the doors of the facility annually.

It is also an important training center for elite figure skaters, with Frank Carroll as head coach. Skaters who have trained at this rink include Michelle Kwan, Timothy Goebel, Evan Lysacek, Beatrisa Liang, Gracie Gold, and Mirai Nagasu.

The facility can be accessed by the Metro K Line via El Segundo station and Mariposa station.

The Toyota Sports Performance Center is home to the Los Angeles Jr. Kings Hockey Program. The Jr. Kings program has seen tremendous growth since their move to the Toyota Sports Performance Center upon its opening. Due to the program's increasing number of teams, they now play some home games at The Rinks-Lakewood ICE, in Lakewood, California, as well.

The center is owned by the Anschutz Entertainment Group, sponsored by Toyota, and operated by American Skating Entertainment Centers. The NBA Development League's Los Angeles D-Fenders played their home games here from the 2011–12 to 2016–17 seasons.

Beginning in the 2017–18 season, Lakers practices relocated to the UCLA Health Training Center, located two blocks away. The D-Fenders also switched to the new arena and were re-branded as the South Bay Lakers.

With the relocation of the Lakers, the Ontario Reign has moved their practices to the Toyota Sports Center in 2019, effectively making the facility a fully operational Los Angeles Kings facility.

The facility was designed by architect Jon Drezner.

== See also ==
- List of sports venues with the name Toyota
