= Compton/Woodley Airport =

Airport in Compton, California

Coordinates: 33°53′24″N 118°14′37″W

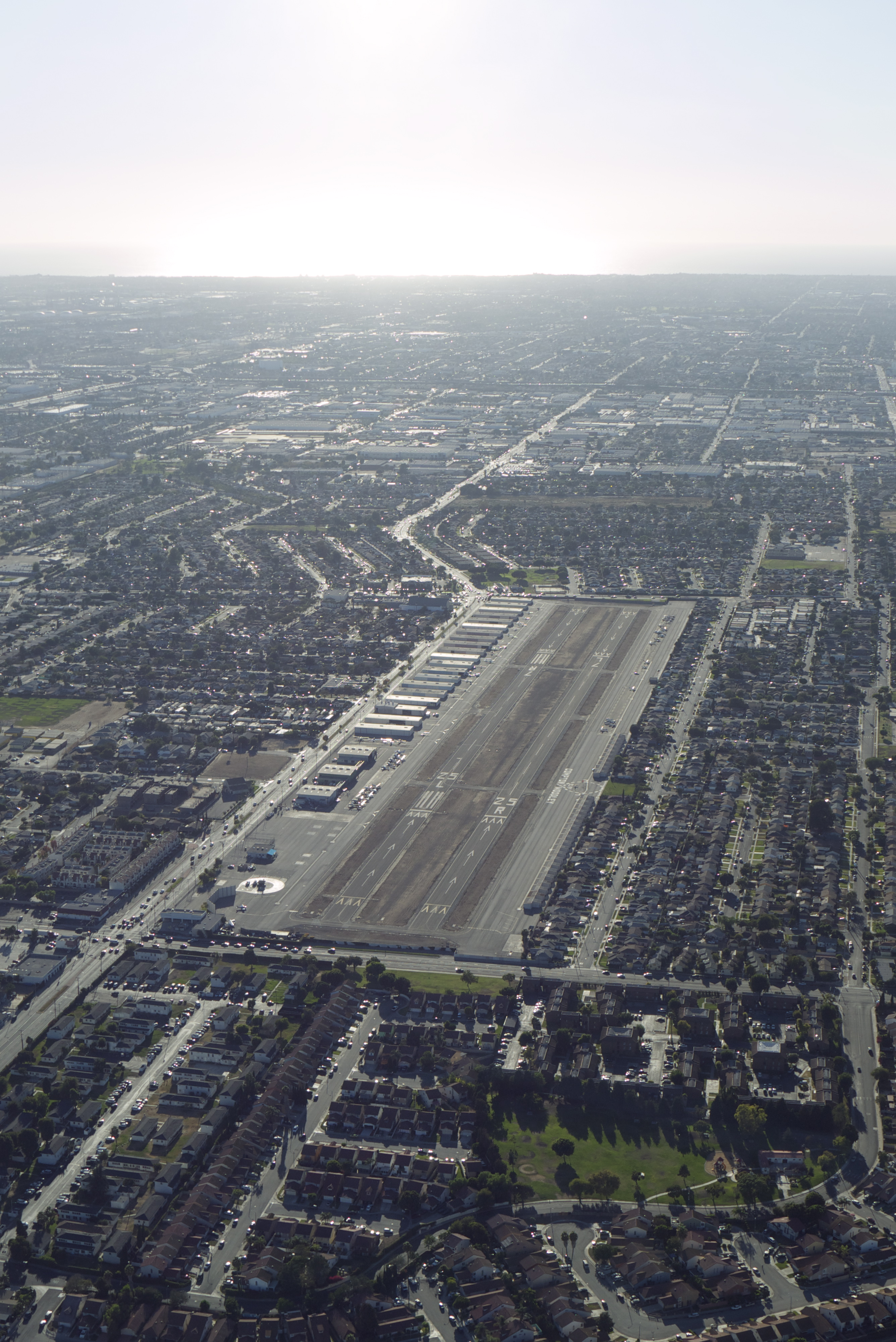
- IATA: CPM; ICAO: KCPM; FAA LID: CPM

Summary
- Airport type: Public
- Owner: County of Los Angeles
- Location: 901 W. Alondra Boulevard, Compton, CA 90220
- Elevation AMSL: 99 ft (30 m)
- Interactive map of Compton/Woodley Airport

Runways
Direction	Length		Surface
Direction	ft	m	Surface
7L/25R	3,322	1,013	Asphalt
7R/25L	3,322	1,013	Asphalt

Statistics (2007)
- Aircraft operations: 66,000
- Based aircraft: 175
- Source: Federal Aviation Administration

Compton/Woodley Airport (IATA: CPM, ICAO: KCPM, FAA LID: CPM) is a public airport in Compton, southern Los Angeles County, California, 2 miles (3.2 km) southwest of Downtown Compton. It is the oldest continuously operating airport in the Los Angeles basin. The FAA's National Plan of Integrated Airport Systems for 2007–2011 categorized it as a relief airport.

It is used for general aviation as an alternative to Los Angeles International Airport, about 8 miles (13 km) west.

== History ==
Colonel C.S. Smith landed in an open field near the town of Compton in June 1924. He felt the field, owned by the local school board, would make an ideal airport location, and negotiated for the airport's founding.

Between 1924 and 1936 the airport and its land passed through several hands until Earl Woodley took over the lease in 1936. He purchased land for a crosswind runway.

During the war years of 1941 to 1946, civilian flying was restricted and the airport was used by the military as a truck depot. After the war, Woodley resumed operations and eventually became owner of the land. When he died in 1962, the airport was threatened with closure when it was purchased by an investment company. Pilot groups, citizens, the mayor of Compton, and the entire Compton City Council encouraged the Board of Supervisors to condemn the land and allow the county to purchase it. In June 1966 the entire airport property of 77 acres was purchased for $2,948,883.

== Facilities ==
Compton/Woodley Airport covers 77 acres (31 ha) and has two asphalt runways (7L/25R and 7R/25L), each 3,322 × 60 ft (1,013 × 18 m). In 2012 the airport had 66,000 general aviation aircraft operations, averaging about 180 per day. 175 aircraft are based at this airport: 151 single-engine, 14 multi-engine, 1 jet, 8 helicopters, and 1 glider.

== In popular culture ==
The Compton Airport is mentioned in the opening bars of Dr. Dre's "Big Ego's" on his multi-platinum album 2001.

In Airline episode 46, Robin Petgrave, the founder of the flight school Tomorrow's Aeronautical Museum, gives a cast member's son a plane ride at Compton Airport with his flight school.
