= List of streets in Los Angeles =

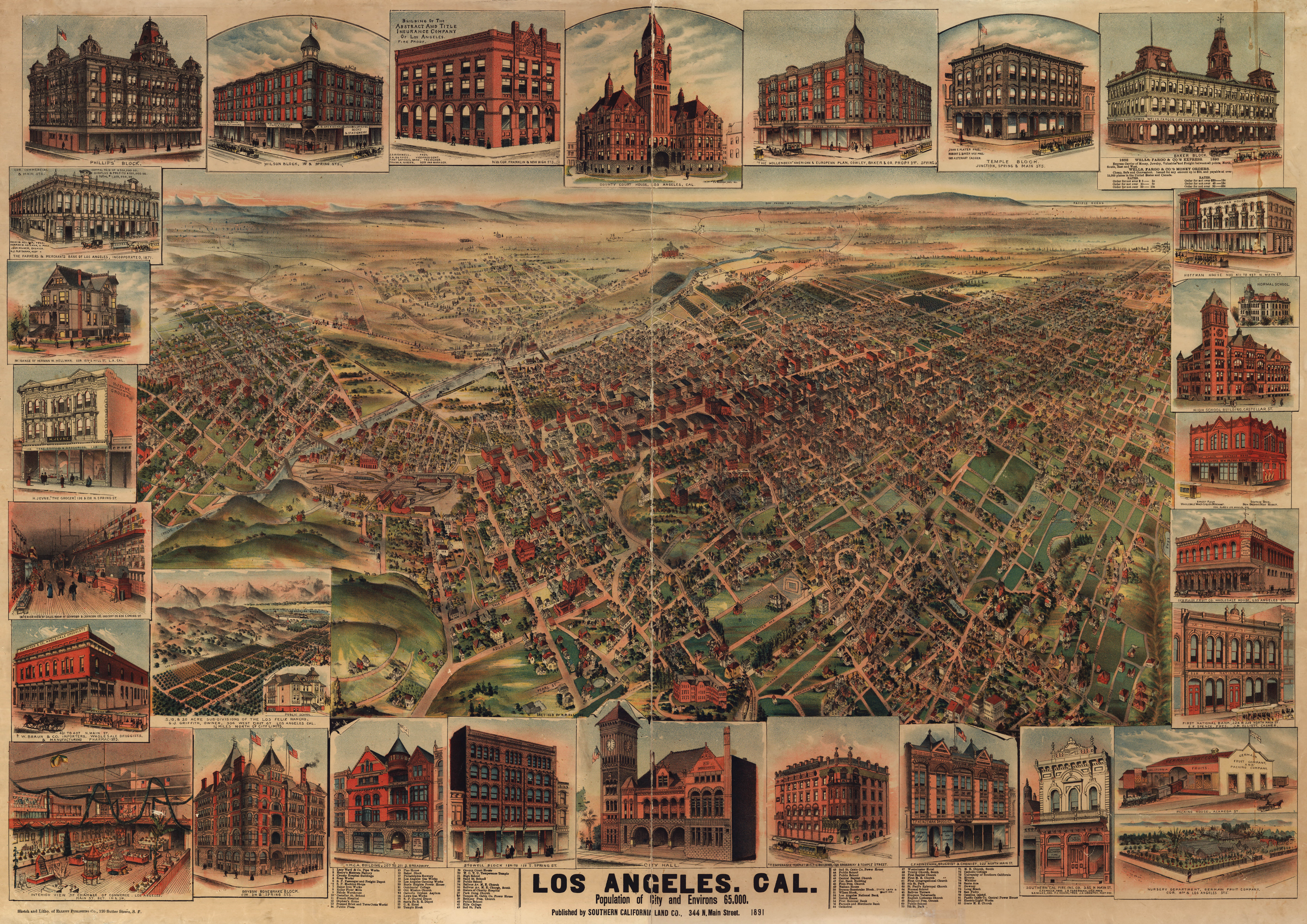
List of streets in Los Angeles

This is a list of notable streets located entirely or partially within Los Angeles, California. They are grouped by type: arterial thoroughfares, commercial corridors, and other streets.

== Arterial thoroughfares ==
=== Adams Boulevard ===
Adams Boulevard, formerly 26th Street, runs east from Washington Boulevard in Culver City to Long Beach Boulevard near the Central Alameda district. It parallels the Santa Monica Freeway for most of its length.

=== Avalon Boulevard ===
Avalon Boulevard runs north for about 17.3 miles (27.8 km) from Water Street in Wilmington to Jefferson Boulevard and San Pedro Street in South Central Los Angeles, passing through the southern Los Angeles County cities and communities of Carson, and Willowbrook.

=== Beverly Boulevard ===
Beverly Boulevard runs east from Santa Monica Boulevard in Beverly Hills to Glendale Boulevard in Westlake, becoming 1st Street. The corner of Beverly Boulevard and La Cienega Boulevard is the center of the studio zone (TMZ), used by the American entertainment industry to determine employee benefits for work performed inside and outside of it. Beverly Boulevard also runs through the Fairfax District, home of the Television City studio complex.

=== Beverly Glen Boulevard ===
Beverly Glen Boulevard runs north for about 17.3 miles (27.8 km) from the Rancho Park Golf Course on Pico Boulevard in West Los Angeles to Ventura Boulevard in Sherman Oaks. It passes through or near Century City, Westwood, and Bel Air.

=== Century Boulevard ===
Century Boulevard runs east from Los Angeles International Airport to Alameda Street in South Gate, connecting Westchester, Inglewood, South Los Angeles, Harbor Gateway, and Watts.

=== Crenshaw Boulevard ===
Crenshaw Boulevard runs north about 23.46 miles (37.76 km) from Burrell Lane in Rancho Palos Verdes to Wilshire Boulevard in the Mid-Wilshire district. Among others, the street runs through the Hyde Park and Crenshaw neighborhoods as well as the cities of Torrance, Gardena, Hawthorne, and Inglewood.

=== Figueroa Street ===
Figueroa Street runs north through the city from Harry Bridges Boulevard in San Pedro to the Ventura Freeway in Eagle Rock. The segment from Chinatown, and through Elysian Park and the Figueroa Street Tunnels, to Cypress Park was replaced by the Arroyo Seco Parkway. Segments of Figueroa Street from San Pedro to Downtown were formerly part of State Route 11 before the parallel Harbor Freeway was built. A short, unconnected northern continuation of Figueroa Street runs outside the city between Glendale and La Cañada Flintridge.

=== Glendale Boulevard ===
Glendale Boulevard runs north about 4.6 miles (7.4 km) from Beverly Boulevard in Westlake to Brand Boulevard in Glendale. A segment in Echo Park is signed as part of State Route 2.

=== Hollywood Boulevard ===
Hollywood Boulevard, formerly Prospect Avenue, runs east about 6.4 miles (10.3 km) from Sunset Plaza Drive in Hollywood Hills West to Sunset Boulevard in Los Feliz, connecting Hollywood, East Hollywood, Little Armenia, and Thai Town. It is famous for running through the Hollywood commercial and entertainment district, including attractions like the Hollywood Walk of Fame.

=== Jefferson Boulevard ===
Jefferson Boulevard runs east from Sepulveda Boulevard near Playa Del Rey to Central Avenue in Historic South Central Los Angeles. A segment runs through Culver City.

=== La Cienega Boulevard ===
La Cienega Boulevard runs north from El Segundo Boulevard at the Hawthorne–Del Aire line to Sunset Boulevard in West Hollywood, connecting Baldwin Hills, Crestview, South Carthay, Pico-Robertson, and other neighborhoods of West Los Angeles with Inglewood, Culver City, and Beverly Hills.

=== Laurel Canyon Boulevard ===
Laurel Canyon Boulevard runs north from Sunset Boulevard in Hollywood Hills West (near the West Hollywood border) through the Laurel Canyon neighborhood to Studio City and various San Fernando Valley districts before ending at Polk Street in Sylmar.

=== Lincoln Boulevard ===
Lincoln Boulevard begins by branching northwest from Sepulveda Boulevard at the northern side of Los Angeles International Airport. It then passes through the districts of Westchester, Playa Vista, and Venice before terminating at San Vicente Boulevard in Santa Monica. The segment of Lincoln Boulevard between Sepulveda Boulevard and the Santa Monica Freeway is designated as part of California State Route 1.

=== Main Street ===
Main Street is a major 20.9-mile (33.6 km) north–south thoroughfare in the city, and also serves as the east–west postal divider for both the city and the county. Its southern end is at Lomita Boulevard at the Carson–Wilmington line. Main Street's northern end is at Mission Road in Lincoln Heights, where it becomes the east-west Valley Boulevard. Main Street passes through South Los Angeles, and the Historic Core, Civic Center, and other areas in Downtown Los Angeles.

=== Martin Luther King Jr. Boulevard ===
Martin Luther King Jr. Boulevard, originally Santa Barbara Avenue, is an east-west thoroughfare that stretches 7.1 miles (11.4 km) from Obama Boulevard in Baldwin Village to South Alameda Street in South Los Angeles.

=== Obama Boulevard ===
Obama Boulevard, formerly Rodeo Road, is a major thoroughfare in South Los Angeles. It stretches 3.5 miles (5.6 km) from Baldwin Hills (past Baldwin Village and Crenshaw Manor) to Leimert Park. It was renamed after former President Barack Obama in 2019.

=== Olympic Boulevard ===
Olympic Boulevard, formerly 10th Street, stretches east from 4th Street in Santa Monica to 4th Street in Montebello. The route is discontinuous in Downtown between San Julian Street and 9th Street / Gladys Avenue. Olympic Boulevard runs through the southern end of principal areas such as West Los Angeles, Westwood, Century City, Beverly Hills, Hancock Park, Koreatown, Westlake. East of downtown, the route connects Boyle Heights, East Los Angeles, Commerce.

=== Pico Boulevard ===
Pico Boulevard runs from the Pacific Ocean at Appian Way in Santa Monica to Central Avenue in Downtown Los Angeles. It connects a culturally diverse range of neighborhoods in the city, including Little Ethiopia and Koreatown.

=== Reseda Boulevard ===
Reseda Boulevard runs through the western San Fernando Valley from Marvin Braude Mulholland Gateway Park near Tarzana north to Sesnon Boulevard in Porter Ranch, passing through Reseda and Northridge.

=== Robertson Boulevard ===
Robertson Boulevard is a north-south route in the Westside that runs from Washington Boulevard in Culver City to Keith Avenue in West Hollywood. It passes through Beverlywood, Crestview, and Pico-Robertson.

=== San Vicente Boulevard ===
San Vicente Boulevard travels in a northwesterly direction from Venice Boulevard in Mid City to Mid-Wilshire and Beverly Grove before entering West Hollywood and terminating at Sunset Boulevard. It is unrelated to a separate stretch of road with the same name runs between Santa Monica and Brentwood.

=== Santa Monica Boulevard ===
Santa Monica Boulevard runs east from Ocean Avenue in Santa Monica to Sunset Boulevard at Sunset Junction. It passes through Beverly Hills and West Hollywood. A portion of it is designated as California State Route 2, while the full route is former U.S. Route 66.

=== Sepulveda Boulevard ===
Sepulveda Boulevard consists of four distinct segments connecting Los Angeles with several other cities in western Los Angeles County. Portions of are designated as part of California State Route 1.

=== Sherman Way ===
Sherman Way, nicknamed The Way, is a major east-west arterial road in the San Fernando Valley, portions of which were on the Owensmouth Line. It terminates in West Hills in the west and at Hollywood Burbank Airport in the east, passing through Reseda, Lake Balboa, Van Nuys, and North Hollywood.

=== Sunset Boulevard ===
Sunset Boulevard runs east about 23.6 miles (38.0 km) from the Pacific Coast Highway in Pacific Palisades to Figueroa Street in downtown Los Angeles. It connects several districts in central and western Los Angeles, Beverly Hills, and West Hollywood (including a portion known as the Sunset Strip).

=== Topanga Canyon Boulevard ===
Topanga Canyon Boulevard, designated as California State Route 27 along its entire 19.97-mile (32.14 km) length, runs north from the Pacific Coast Highway at Topanga State Beach near Pacific Palisades, through the Topanga Canyon in Topanga, across the Santa Monica Mountains, and continuing through Woodland Hills, Canoga Park, West Hills, and Chatsworth to the Ronald Reagan Freeway.

=== Van Nuys Boulevard ===
Van Nuys Boulevard is a major north–south arterial road that runs through the central San Fernando Valley between Valley Vista Boulevard in Sherman Oaks and Fenton Avenue in Lake View Terrace.

=== Venice Boulevard ===
Venice Boulevard, formerly West 16th Street, runs east from Ocean Front Walk (a pedestrian road) in Venice to Main Street in downtown Los Angeles. A segment of Venice Boulevard between Venice and the Crestview neighborhood is designated as California State Route 187.

=== Ventura Boulevard ===
Ventura Boulevard runs east through the southern San Fernando Valley from Valley Circle Boulevard in Woodland Hills to Lankershim Boulevard and Cahuenga Boulevard near Universal City. It runs along the historic El Camino Real, and was formerly part of U.S. Route 101 before the parallel Ventura Freeway was completed.

=== Victory Boulevard ===
Victory Boulevard runs about 25 miles (40 km) traversing almost the entire length of the San Fernando Valley in Los Angeles and Burbank. It travels east from the Upper Las Virgenes Canyon Open Space Preserve to Riverside Drive near Griffith Park. Its easternmost 2-mile (3.2 km) segment actually runs north–south.

=== Washington Boulevard ===
Washington Boulevard runs about 27.4 miles (44.1 km) east from Venice Beach and Marina Peninsula to Whittier Boulevard in Whittier. It runs through Crestview, Culver City and through Mid City, Arlington Heights, Pico Union, City of Commerce, Montebello, Pico Rivera, and Los Nietos.

=== Westwood Boulevard ===
Westwood Boulevard runs north from National Boulevard in the Palms neighborhood to the campus of UCLA in Westwood.

=== Wilshire Boulevard ===
Wilshire Boulevard runs about 15.83 miles (25.48 km) east from Ocean Avenue in Santa Monica east to Grand Avenue in downtown Los Angeles. It passes through the Westwood, Mid-Wilshire, Miracle Mile, Los Angeles, and Koreatown districts, as well as Beverly Hills.

== Commercial corridors ==
- Pacific Coast Highway/Lincoln Boulevard (SR 1)
- Santa Monica Boulevard (SR 2)
- Decker Canyon Road (SR 23)
- Topanga Canyon Boulevard (SR 27)
- Alameda Street (SR 47)
- Highland Avenue (SR 170)
- Venice Boulevard (SR 187)

== Other streets ==
- Alameda Street
- Avenue of the Stars
- Broadway
- Bundy Drive
- Centinela Avenue
- Central Avenue
- Cesar Chavez Avenue
- Fairfax Avenue
- Florence Avenue
- Fountain Avenue
- Grand Avenue
- Highland Avenue
- Huntington Drive
- Imperial Highway
- La Brea Avenue
- Manchester Avenue
- Melrose Avenue
- Mission Road
- Mulholland Drive
- Normandie Avenue
- Slauson Avenue
- Spring Street
- Vermont Avenue
- Western Avenue

== Alleyways ==
- Olvera Street
- Santee Alley

== See also ==
- List of Los Angeles placename etymologies
- Transportation in Los Angeles
- Pico and Sepulveda
- Los Angeles streets, 1–10
- Los Angeles streets, 11–40
- Los Angeles streets, 41–250
- Los Angeles Avenues
- List of streets in the San Gabriel Valley
