= Campus El Segundo Athletic Fields =

Athletic field in El Segundo, California

Campus El Segundo
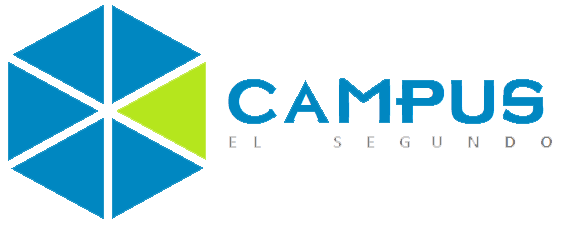

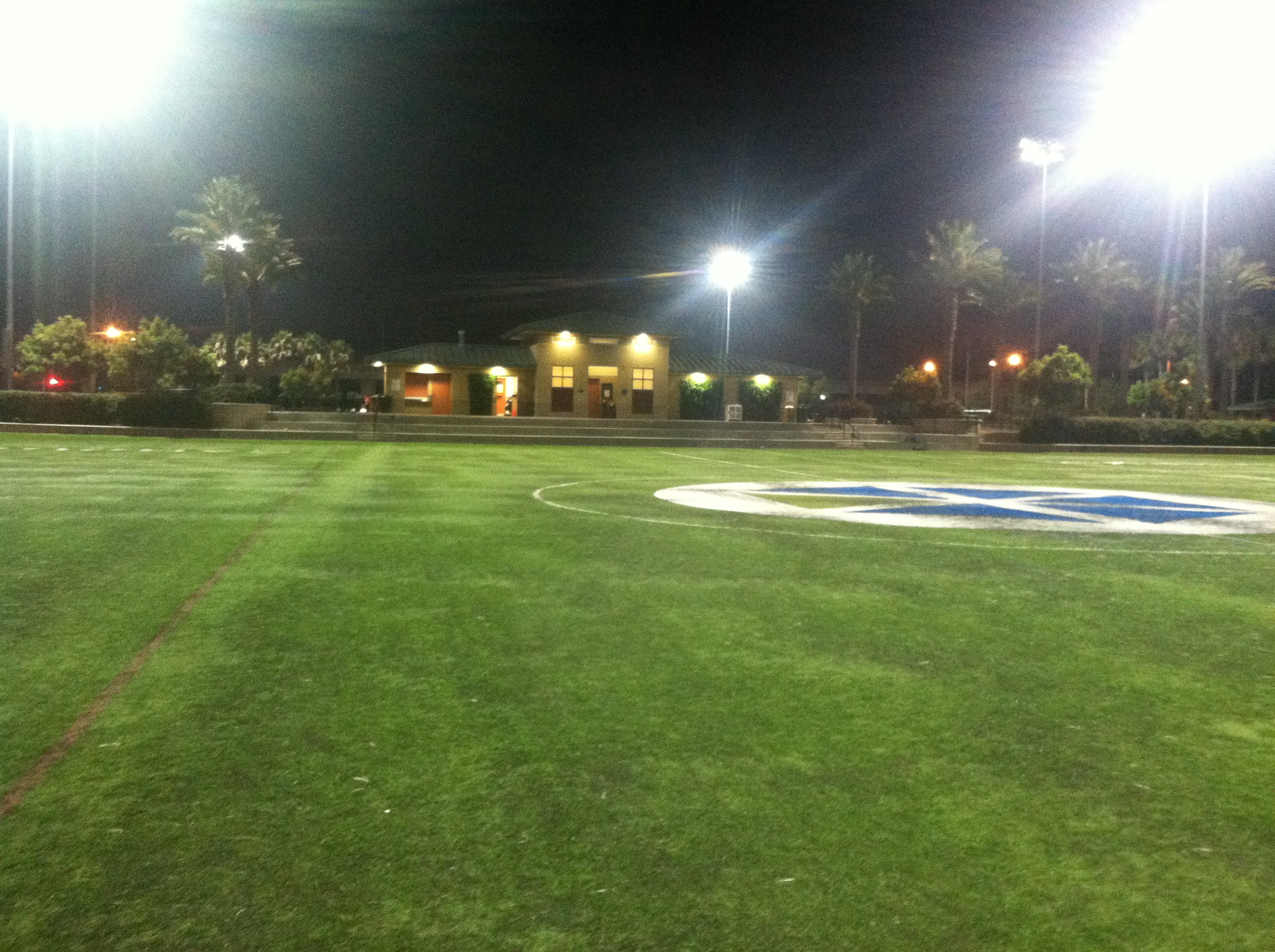
- Campus El Segundo at night August 9, 2013
- Interactive map of Campus El Segundo
- Location: 2201 E. Mariposa Ave. El Segundo, California, United States
- Coordinates: 33°9′24″N 118°38′6″W
- Owner: City of El Segundo
- Surface: Artificial Grass
- Field size: 100 by 65 yards (300 ft × 195 ft; 91 m × 59 m) (each field)
- Public transit: Mariposa

Construction
- Groundbreaking: 2006
- Opened: July 2007

Campus El Segundo Athletic Fields is an outdoor athletic field in El Segundo, California. The park was opened in 2007, by English International footballer David Beckham and French International footballer Zinedine Zidane.

The facility can be easily accessed from Mariposa station, located across the street from the fields.

Located near Campus El Segundo is Toyota Sports Center, a practice facility for the Los Angeles Kings, which contains an NHL sized ice rink.

== The Edge ==
Part of Campus El Segundo The Edge at Campus El Segundo is a 220,000 square foot (14 acres) high-quality business park with 15 two-story buildings and 20,000 SF of support retail it is currently being developed by Mar Ventures, Inc. and AMB Property Corporation. Located in El Segundo, 801 Parkview Drive North has convenient access to the beach communities from Palos Verdes to Santa Monica, a direct on-ramp to the 105 Freeway with the San Diego 405 Freeway approximately one mile away and proximity to both LAX and the Metro C Line. The building size and number of window openings, filled with high-performance glass, aluminum composite panels, cornices, and canopies, make the buildings aesthetically pleasing. Many observers have found it hard to believe the buildings are tilt-up.

== Usage ==
=== Soccer ===
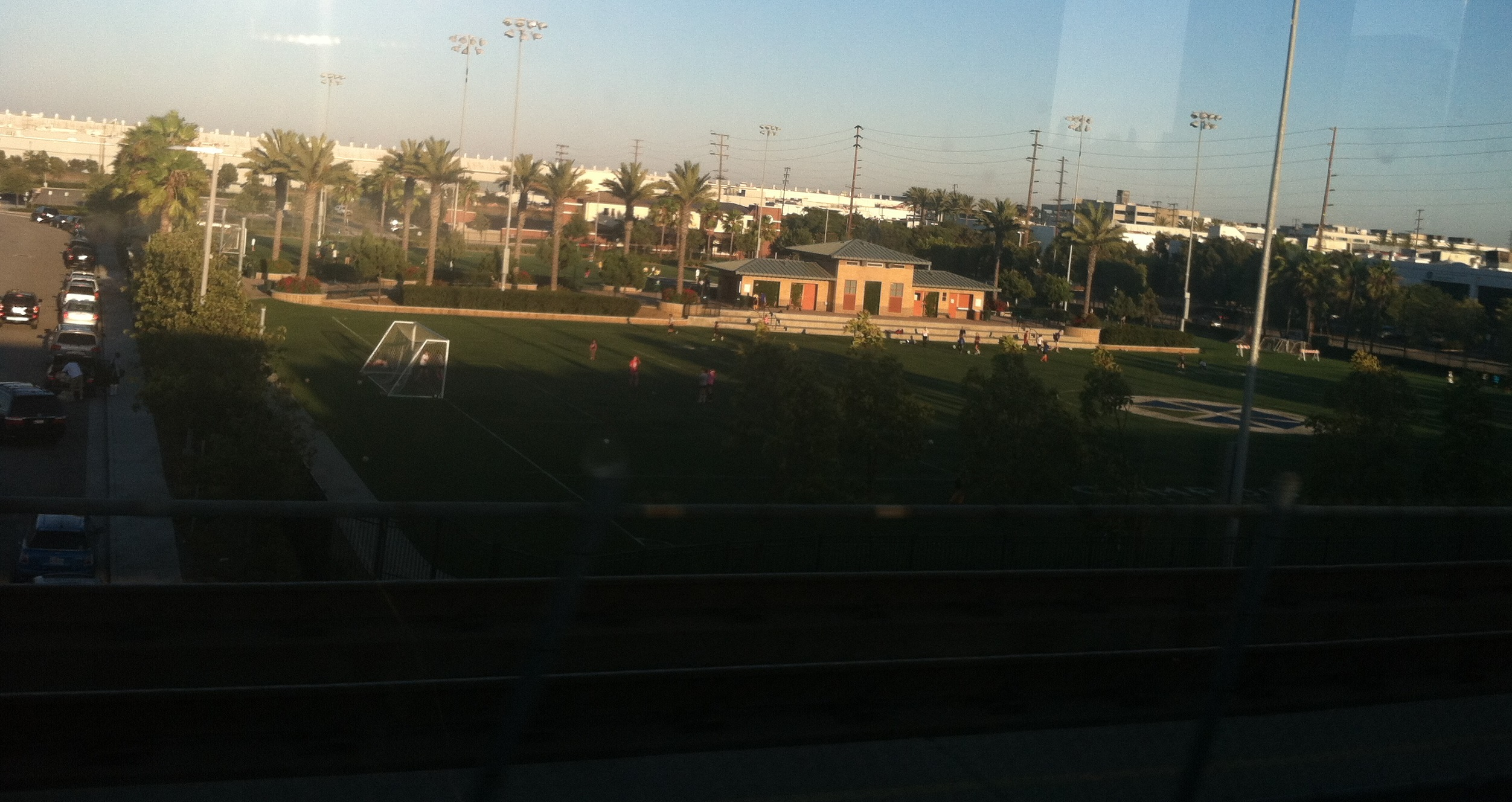
Campus El Segundo September 16, 2013.

The prime usage of the field is soccer. Many teams use Campus as their training ground.

=== Lacrosse ===
Is the home of the Pacific Edge Lacrosse Association (PELA) and many recreational lacrosse players use Campus El Segundo to practice or play.

=== American football ===
Many football players practice or play games at Campus El Segundo.

== Rules ==
- No food or drink (other than water) on the fields. Food/drink is allowed on cement areas.
- No seeds or shelled snacks on the fields (i.e. sunflower, peanuts, etc.).
- No chewing gum on the fields.
- No glass on the fields
- No smoking or tobacco products on the fields.
- No alcohol on the facility.
- No animals on the fields.
- No metal spiked cleats on the fields
- All footwear on the fields must be free of mud, grease, etc.
- No items that might puncture the turf allowed on the fields (i.e. no in-ground field markers, poles, stakes, etc.).
- No marking or painting the fields without approval from the City of El Segundo.
- No hanging or climbing on the field goals or netting.
- No items such as tables, booths, etc. allowed on the fields without approval from the City of El Segundo.
- No fire, fireworks, barbecues on the facility without approval from the City of El Segundo.
- No motorized vehicles on the facility without approval from the City of El Segundo.
- No riding skateboards, roller blades, scooters, bikes, and no golf allowed.
- No littering
