= Douglas station =

Douglas Station may refer to:

- Douglas station (Los Angeles Metro), a light rail station in California, United States
- Lafarge Lake–Douglas station, a rapid transit station in Metro Vancouver, British Columbia, Canada
- Douglas Railway Station, main terminus of the Isle of Man Railway
- Douglas, Falkland Islands, a settlement on East Falkland Island
