= Mariposa station =

Light rail station in El Segundo, California

Mariposa
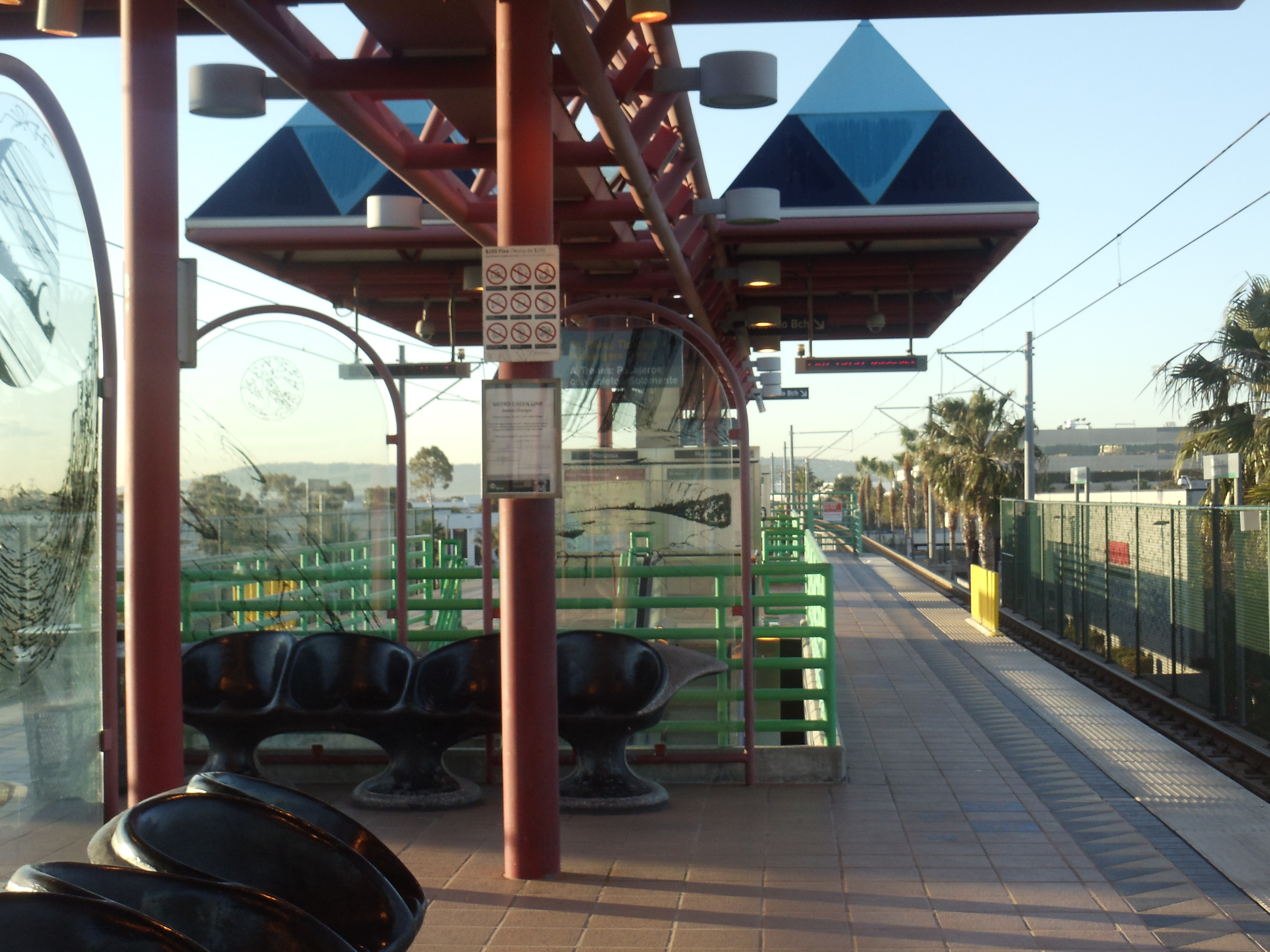
- Mariposa station platform, 2012

General information
- Location: 555 North Nash Street; El Segundo, California
- Coordinates: 33.9235°N 118.3875°W
- Owner: Los Angeles County Metropolitan Transportation Authority
- Platforms: 1 island platform
- Tracks: 2
- Connections: Metro Micro; Torrance Transit

Construction
- Structure type: Elevated
- Cycle facilities: Racks
- Accessible: Yes

History
- Opened: August 12, 1995
- Former names: Mariposa Ave/Nash St (1995–2003)

Passengers
- FY 2026: 337 (avg. wkdy boardings)

Services
Preceding station	Metro Rail	Following station
Aviation/Century toward Expo/Crenshaw	K Line	El Segundo toward Redondo Beach
Former services
Preceding station	Metro Rail	Following station
El Segundo toward Redondo Beach	C Line	Aviation/LAX toward Norwalk
Location

Mariposa station is an elevated light rail station on the K Line of the Los Angeles Metro Rail system. It is located over Mariposa Avenue, after which the station is named, alongside Nash Street in El Segundo, California. It opened with the commencement of Green Line service on August 12, 1995. The station has been served by the K Line since a restructuring in November 2024.

The station was initially named Mariposa Ave/Nash St but was later simplified to Mariposa in 2003.

Mariposa is close to several sports venues: the UCLA Health Training Center (the practice facility for the Los Angeles Lakers and the venue for the South Bay Lakers), the Toyota Sports Performance Center (the practice facility for the Los Angeles Kings and Ontario Reign hockey teams) and the Campus El Segundo Athletic Fields.

The train platform, currently suitable for two-car trains, is planned to be lengthened by 2028 to accommodate longer three-car trains.

== Service ==
=== Hours and frequency ===
K Line service hours are approximately from 4:30 a.m. until 12:00 a.m. daily. Trains operate every 10 minutes throughout most of the day. Trains run every 20 minutes after 8:00 p.m. every day and before 8:00 a.m. on weekends.

=== Connections ===
As of June 6, 2025, the following connections are available:

- Metro Micro: LAX/Inglewood Zone
- Torrance Transit: 8

== Notable places nearby ==
The station is within walking distance of the following notable places:

- UCLA Health Training Center
- Toyota Sports Performance Center
- Mattel Headquarters
- Campus El Segundo Athletic Fields
