= Jon Drezner =

American architect and designer

- Born: New Jersey, United States
- Education: St. Lawrence University
- Occupation: Architect
- Practice: Drezner Architecture
- Website: www.drezner.com

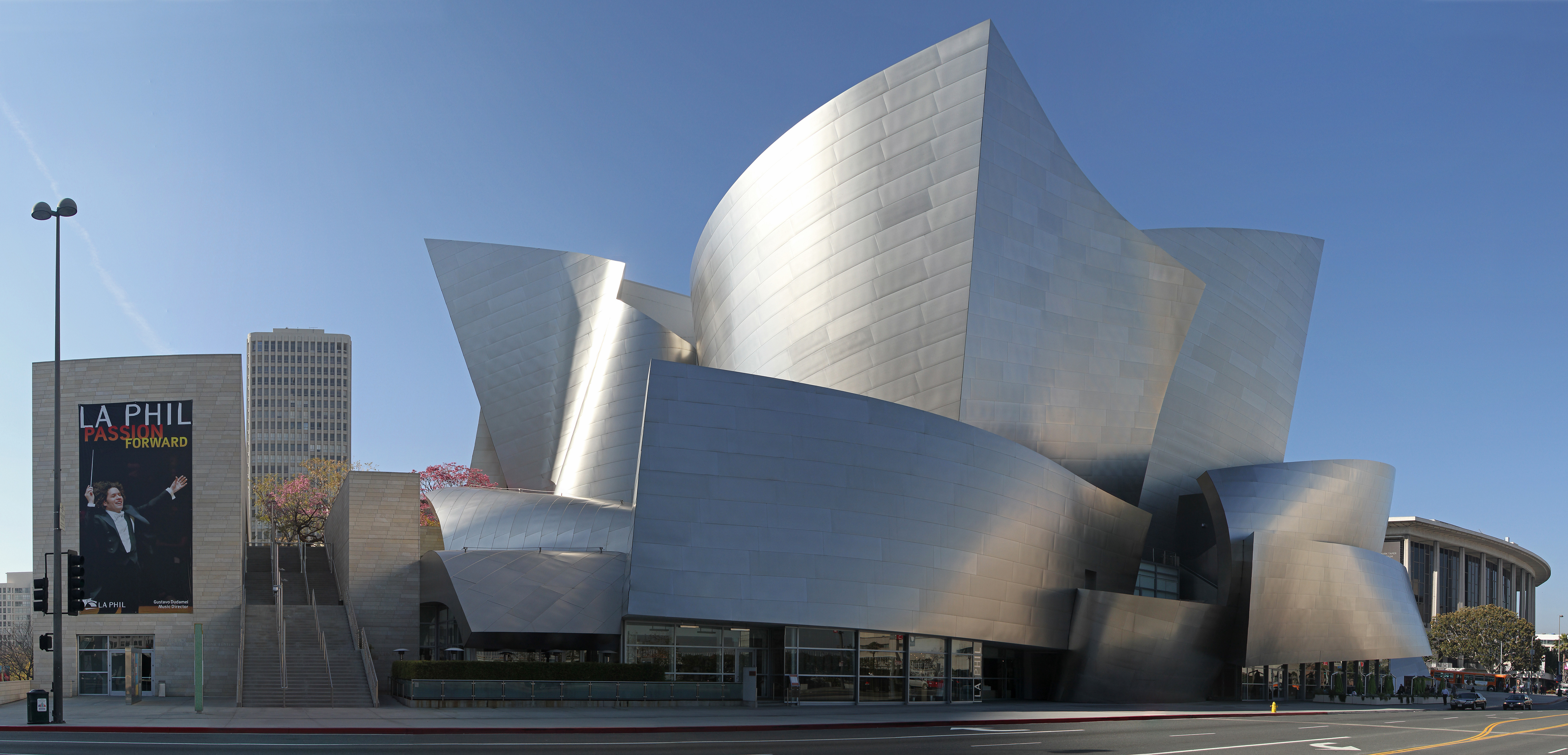
Walt Disney Concert Hall, Los Angeles, California.

Jon Drezner is an American architect and designer. He worked with Frank Gehry and Gehry Partners in the 1990s on projects including the Walt Disney Concert Hall and the Gehry House. He founded his own architecture firm, Drezner Architecture, in 1997, with initial projects including the Toyota Sports Center and 1428 Chelten Way, a residential project. He relocated to Princeton, New Jersey in 2003, where his work has focused on residential projects in the area, notably a residence at 98 Battle Road.

Drezner grew up in Princeton and attended Princeton Day School.

== Education ==
Drezner received his Bachelor of Arts from St. Lawrence University. In 1990, he received his Masters of Architecture degree from the Southern California Institute of Architecture.

== Style ==
Drezner's architectural style focuses on creative, energy efficient buildings. Much of his work is in a modern style, with large interior spaces and windows. Exteriors of residential projects are often completed with white plaster.
