= Downtown Compton =

Coordinates: 33.8962°N 118.2277°W

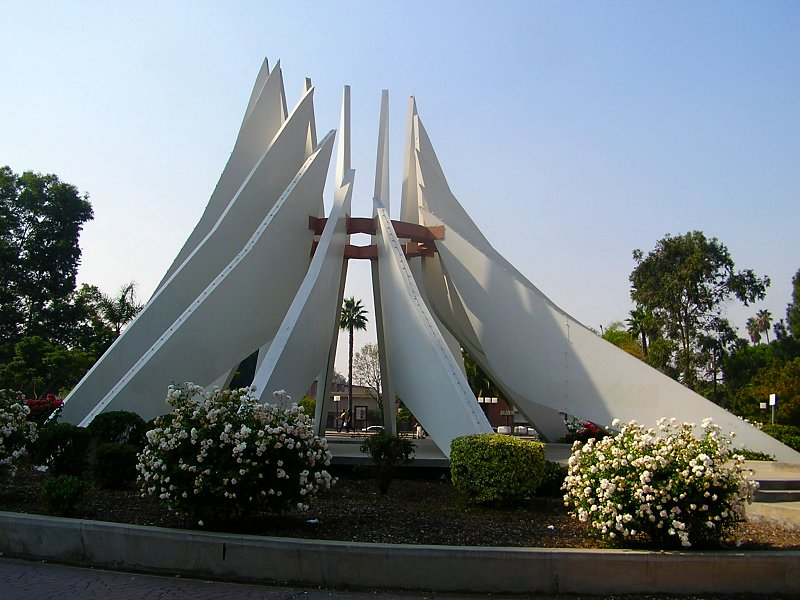
- The Martin Luther King, Jr. Memorial in front of the Compton City Hall and the Superior Court building. The monument is the logo for the city and is featured on signage.
- Nickname: Downtown C.P.T
- Interactive map of Downtown Compton
- Country: United States
- State: California
- County: County of Los Angeles

Downtown Compton is the major business district of the city of Compton, California. Downtown Compton started out as a thriving and safe environment throughout the early 1950s to the mid-1970s. When gang violence and robberies sparked in the 70's, businesses began to move out and relocate leaving Downtown Compton a ghost town. It is now home to many businesses, two shopping centers, and the Martin Luther King Jr. Transit Center. The Metro A Line light rail now runs through Downtown Compton making travel to the city much easier.

== History ==
=== 1950s–1970s ===
Throughout the 1950s to early 1970s, Downtown Compton was a major business district and home to many companies. During weekends, streets would be packed and filled with shoppers, especially during the holidays.

=== 1970s–1980s ===
During the late '70s, the face of Downtown Compton began to take a drastic turn. Robberies and ongoing gang violence due to the primarily African-American street gangs, the Crips and the Bloods, businesses began to move elsewhere to avoid further problems.

=== 1980s–1990s ===
During the late 80s, the face of Compton began to change after the election of mayor Omar Bradley. This included the construction of the Compton Town Center. Around this time, the Los Angeles Metro Rail system began adding the finishing touches to the Blue Line that runs straight through Downtown Compton on the median of Willowbrook Avenue. This led to the construction of the new Martin Luther King Jr. Transit Center, also located on Willowbrook along with Compton station.

== Recent years ==
Downtown Compton is now home to the following businesses.

- Martin Luther King Jr. Transit Center
- Compton Town Center
- Renaissance Plaza
- Compton Courthouse
