= Artesia station =

Light rail station in Compton, California

Artesia
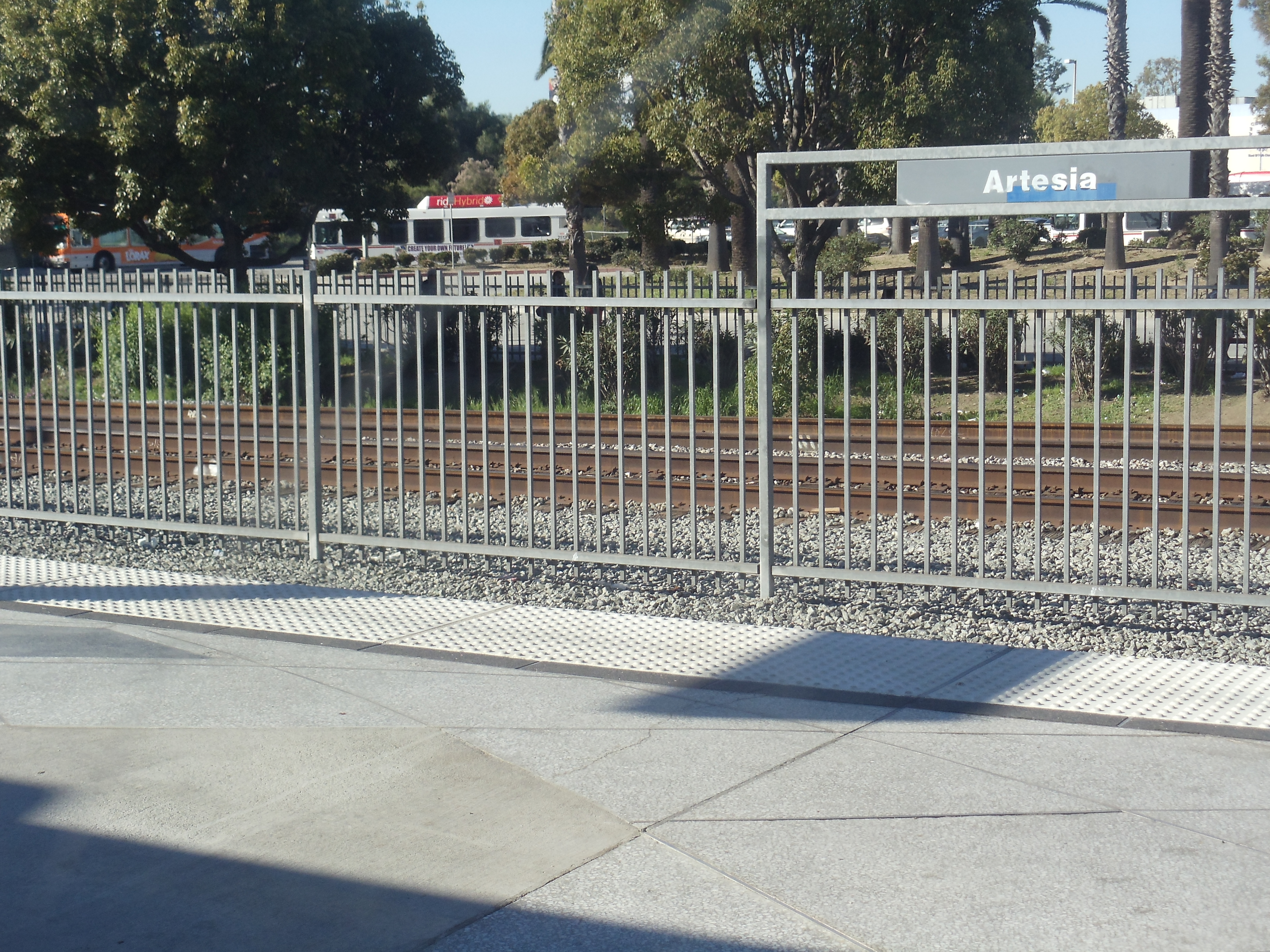
- Artesia station platform

General information
- Location: 1920 1/2 Acacia Avenue; Compton, California
- Coordinates: 33.8766°N 118.2227°W
- Owner: Los Angeles County Metropolitan Transportation Authority
- Platforms: 1 island platform
- Tracks: 2
- Connections: Compton Renaissance Transit; Long Beach Transit; Los Angeles Metro Bus; Torrance Transit

Construction
- Structure type: At-grade
- Parking: 380 spaces
- Accessible: Yes

History
- Opened: July 14, 1990; 36 years ago
- Rebuilt: June 1, 2019
- Former names: Dominguez (Pacific Electric)

Passengers
- FY 2025: 1,634 (avg. wkdy boardings)

Services
| Preceding station | Metro Rail | Following station |
|---|---|---|
| Del Amo toward Long Beach | A Line | Compton toward Pomona |
Former services
| Preceding station | Pacific Electric | Following station |
|---|---|---|
| Dominguez Junction toward Morgan Avenue | Long Beach | Compton toward Pacific Electric Building |
| Dominguez Junction toward San Pedro | San Pedro via Dominguez | Compton toward Pacific Electric Building |
Location

Artesia station is an at-grade light rail station on the A Line of the Los Angeles Metro Rail system. The station is located alongside the Union Pacific freight railroad's Wilmington Subdivision (the historic route of the Pacific Electric Railway), at its intersection with Artesia Boulevard, after which the station is named, in the city of Compton, California.

Artesia is a park and ride station with 380 parking spaces. The station is near the southern border of Compton, California near the unincorporated community of Rancho Dominguez. It is on Artesia Boulevard near the intersection of Alameda Street. It is also close to the Gardena Freeway (SR 91).

== Service ==
=== Hours and frequency ===
A Line service hours are from approximately 4:30 a.m. and 11:45 p.m. daily. Trains operate every 8 minutes during peak hours, Monday to Friday. Trains run every 10 minutes, during midday on weekdays and weekends, from 9:00 a.m. to 7:00 p.m. Night and early morning service is approximately every 20 minutes every day.

=== Connections ===
As of December 15, 2024, the following connections are available:

- Compton Renaissance Transit: 5
- Long Beach Transit: 51, 61, 141
- Los Angeles Metro Bus: 60, 202, 205, 261
- Metro Micro: Watts/Compton Zone
- Torrance Transit: 6, 13

== Notable places nearby ==
The station is within walking distance of the following notable places:

- Compton College
- Crystal Casino
- Dominguez Rancho Adobe
- Major League Baseball Urban Youth Academy
