= Wardlow station =

Los Angeles Metro Rail station

Wardlow
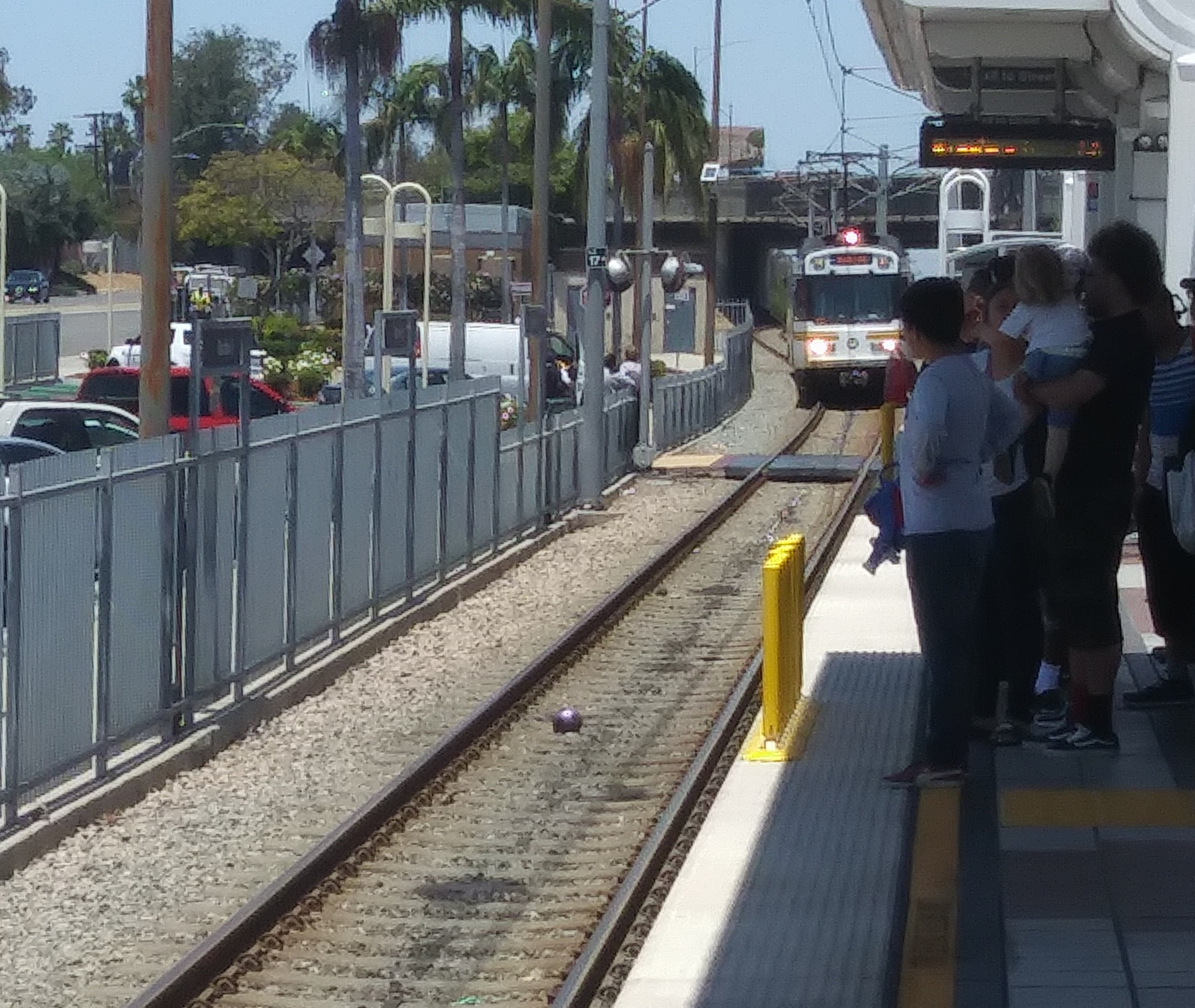
- Wardlow station platform

General information
- Location: 3420 North Pacific Place; Long Beach, California
- Coordinates: 33.8206°N 118.1962°W
- Owner: Los Angeles County Metropolitan Transportation Authority
- Platforms: 1 island platform
- Tracks: 2
- Connections: Long Beach Transit

Construction
- Structure type: At-grade
- Parking: 139 spaces
- Cycle facilities: Long Beach Bike Share station, racks and lockers
- Accessible: Yes

History
- Opened: July 14, 1990; 36 years ago
- Rebuilt: June 1, 2019

Passengers
- FY 2025: 745 (avg. wkdy boardings)

Services
Preceding station	Metro Rail	Following station
Willow Street toward Downtown Long Beach	A Line	Del Amo toward Pomona
Former services
Preceding station	Pacific Electric	Following station
Willow toward Morgan Avenue	Long Beach	Los Cerritos toward Pacific Electric Building
Willow toward Balboa	Balboa	Los Cerritos toward Pacific Electric Building
Location

Wardlow station is an at-grade light rail station on the A Line of the Los Angeles Metro Rail system. The station is located on the A Line's exclusive right-of-way (the historic route of the Pacific Electric Railway) that parallels Pacific Place, at its intersection with Wardlow Street, after which the station is named, in the Wrigley neighborhood of Long Beach, California.

Metro's Division 11, a maintenance and rail vehicle storage facility, is located between the Wardlow and Del Amo stations.

== Service ==
=== Hours and frequency ===
A Line service hours are from approximately 4:30 a.m. and 11:45 p.m. daily. Trains operate every 8 minutes during peak hours, Monday to Friday. Trains run every 10 minutes, during midday on weekdays and weekends, from 9:00 a.m. to 7:00 p.m. Night and early morning service is approximately every 20 minutes every day.

=== Connections ===
As of December 15, 2024, the following connections are available:

- Long Beach Transit: 8, 41, 131, 181, 182

In addition, the station is accessible to the Los Angeles River Bikeway.

=== History ===
The present Wardlow station is between Los Cerritos and Vista Del Mar stations of the Pacific Electric Railway's Long Beach line, which opened in 1902. Los Cerritos station opened in 1906 to serve the new Los Cerritos neighborhood, with a county park donated by the Bixby family, who owned Rancho Los Cerritos. The Los Cerritos station was an express station primarily serving middle class suburban residents who worked in downtown Los Angeles through the 1950s. The area was annexed into the City of Long Beach in 1924. Vista Del Mar Station, which was cited south of Wardlow road, was named for Del Mar street, which paralleled the railroad right of way, and the station served as a transfer station between the Pacific Electric's Long Beach and Balboa lines rather than a destination. Many street alignments in the area such as the diagonal San Antonio Way or the curve of Carson St between Elm Ave. and Long Beach Blvd. were laid out to feed into Los Cerritos station.

In 1958, the construction of the 405 freeway created a barrier between the two stations, and the predecessor agency to LA Metro took possession of the right-of-way underneath the freeway. After the closure of the original Pacific Electric in 1961, the area around the station became a dumping ground for toxic waste from Signal Hill oil sludge, which forced mass neighborhood evacuations when the Metro blue line was reconstructed in the 1980s. In fact, much of the embankment for the nearby I-405/I-710 interchange consists of illegally dumped toxic soil. Because of the toxic waste problem (and perhaps affluent neighborhood aversion to mass transit), a decision was made to cite the station south of the freeway rather than at its historical site next to Los Cerritos Park.

A Metro-owned non-ADA accessible pedestrian path between Los Cerritos Park connects to Magnolia avenue in the Wrigley heights neighborhood – about a 20-minute walk from the station; however, because Wardlow station was sited south of the freeway when it was rebuilt in 1990 for the LACMTA's Blue Line, the historical pedestrian catchment of the Los Cerritos Neighborhood (and by extension, Bixby Knolls) was cut off from the new station and pedestrian path. Pacific Place lacks sidewalks connecting from the adjoining neighborhood to the station, which is not served by any crosstown routes of Long Beach Transit. As a result, Wardlow station is one of the least-used on the A line. In 2015, UC Berkeley's Center for Law, the Energy and the Environment ranked Wardlow Station as the worst rail transit station in Los Angeles County, citing lack of accessibility to housing, transit, and shops.

=== Art ===
The station features a 1992 sculpture by artist Jacqueline Dreager called "Great Gathering Place," described as "some of the most abstract on the entire A line." It is inspired by a sundial installed at the nearby (but now cut off) Rancho Los Cerritos.
