= Los Angeles streets, 1–10 =

This article covers streets in Los Angeles between and including 1st and 10th Street. These streets run parallel to each other, roughly east-west. Addresses change from west to east (for instance West 1st Street to East 1st Street) at Main Street.

All of these streets run through Downtown Los Angeles. In addition, many of the streets also run through Westlake and Boyle Heights. 1st, 4th, 6th, 7th, and Olympic have crossings over the Los Angeles River; the others do not.

== 1st Street ==
1st Street connects Beverly Grove, Downtown Los Angeles, East Los Angeles, and Monterey Park. While is serves as a major road east of downtown Los Angeles, it is a mostly residential street to the west. 1st Street serves as a postal divider for Los Angeles between north and south.

== 2nd Street ==
2nd Street carries traffic in Downtown Los Angeles, but is a residential street elsewhere. The 2nd Street Tunnel opened in 1924, carrying traffic under Bunker Hill between Figueroa Street and Hill Street. The Regional Connector, a Los Angeles Metro Rail tunnel, opened in 2023 to carry Los Angeles Metro Rail trains underneath both 2nd Street and the 2nd Street Tunnel between roughly Grand Avenue and roughly San Pedro Street.

== 3rd Street ==
3rd Street runs from downtown Beverly Hills by Santa Monica Boulevard east to Alameda Street in Downtown Los Angeles, where it shares a one-way couplet with 4th Street. East of Alameda it becomes 4th Street, where it heads to East Los Angeles, where it turns back into 3rd Street upon crossing Indiana Street. 3rd Street eventually becomes Pomona Boulevard in Monterey Park, where it then turns into Potrero Grande Drive and finally turns into Rush Street in Rosemead and ends in El Monte.

== 4th Street ==
4th Street is a residential street west of downtown, but shares a one-way couplet with 3rd Street in Downtown and is a major street in Boyle Heights.

== 5th Street ==
5th Street is mostly a residential street, but in a major street in downtown as a one-way couplet with 6th Street.

== 6th Street ==
6th Street exists in two segments. The western segment starts at Central Los Angeles, primarily as a residential street. It then serves as a one-way couplet with 5th Street in downtown before crossing the Los Angeles River at the Sixth Street Viaduct, where it then becomes Whittier Boulevard. The eastern segment of 6th Street runs discontinuous through Eastside Los Angeles and East Los Angeles.

== 7th Street ==
7th Street runs from Norton Avenue in Mid-Wilshire through downtown to Euclid Avenue in Boyle Heights and East Los Angeles

== 8th Street ==
8th Street is a residential street in Miracle Mile, then becomes a major street in Koreatown. In downtown, it shares a one-way couplet with 9th Street before becoming an industrial street. It is a major residential street east of the Los Angeles River.

== 9th Street ==
9th Street is a residential street in Hancock Park. It was renamed James M. Wood Boulevard through Westlake and Koreatown. It shares a one-way couplet with 8th Street in downtown. East of Gladys Avenue in South Central, it becomes the eastern segment of Olympic Boulevard. The Fashion Institute of Design & Merchandising (FIDM) is located on 9th Street and Grand Avenue.

== 10th Street ==
Most of 10th Street was designated as Olympic Boulevard for the 1932 Summer Olympics. Various segments of the old 10th Street still exist as smaller streets.

== See also ==
- Los Angeles streets, 11–40
- Los Angeles streets, 41–250
- Los Angeles avenues
- List of streets in Los Angeles
