= Compton station =

Los Angeles Metro Rail station

Compton
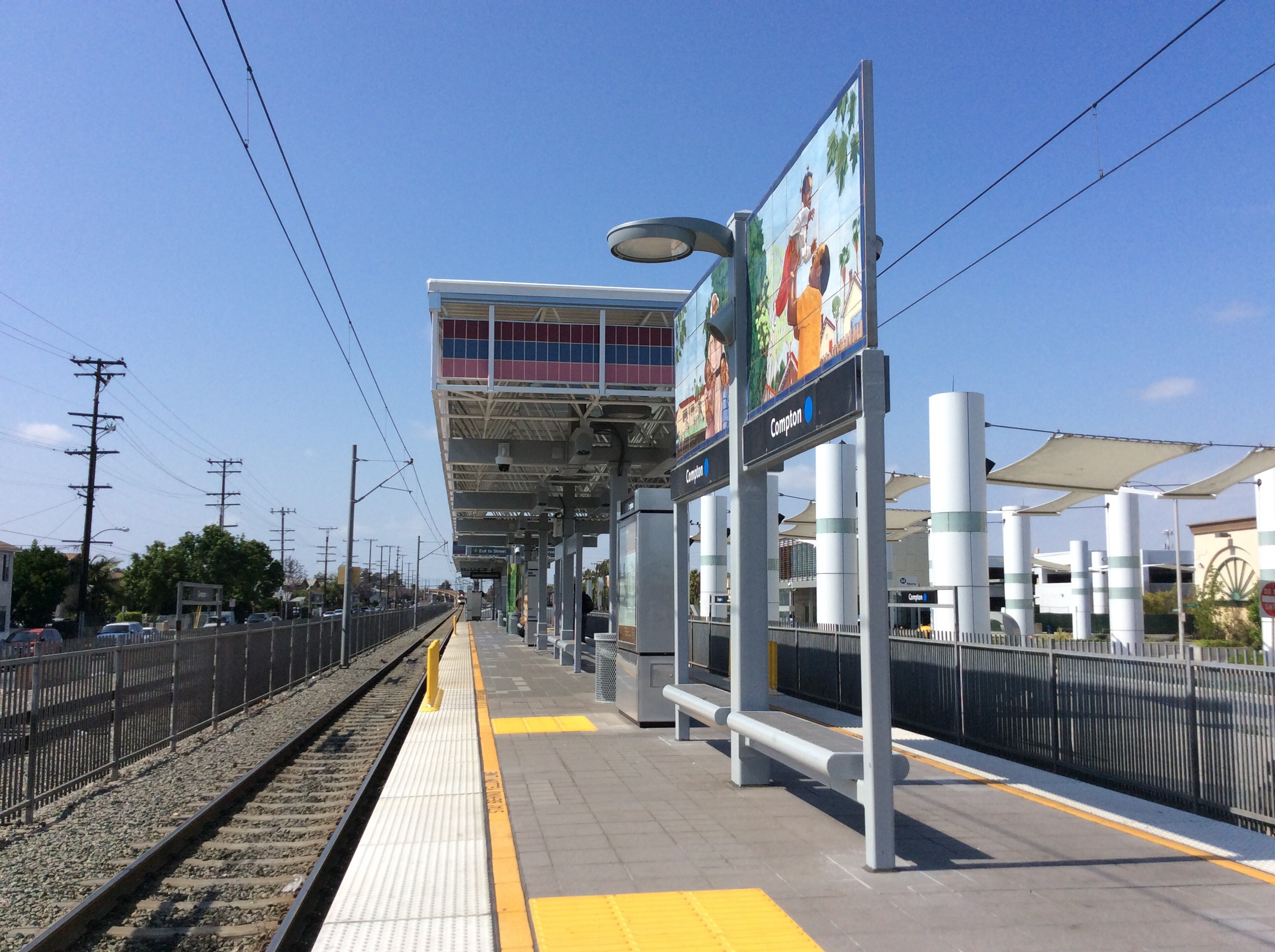
- Compton station platform

General information
- Location: 275 Willowbrook Avenue; Compton, California
- Coordinates: 33.8975°N 118.2243°W
- Owner: Los Angeles County Metropolitan Transportation Authority
- Platforms: 1 island platform
- Tracks: 2
- Connections: Compton Renaissance Transit; GTrans; Greyhound Lines; Los Angeles Metro Bus

Construction
- Structure type: At-grade
- Parking: 40 spaces
- Cycle facilities: Racks
- Accessible: Yes

History
- Opened: July 14, 1990; 36 years ago
- Rebuilt: June 1, 2019

Passengers
- FY 2025: 2,045 (avg. wkdy boardings)

Services
Preceding station	Metro Rail	Following station
Artesia toward Long Beach	A Line	Willowbrook/Rosa Parks toward Pomona
Former services
Preceding station	Pacific Electric	Following station
Dominguez toward Morgan Avenue	Long Beach	Winona toward Pacific Electric Building
Dominguez toward San Pedro	San Pedro via Dominguez	Winona toward Pacific Electric Building
Dominguez toward Santa Ana SP	Santa Ana	Winona toward Pacific Electric Building
Dominguez toward Balboa	Balboa	Winona toward Pacific Electric Building
Location

Compton station is an at-grade light rail station on the A Line of the Los Angeles Metro Rail system. The station is located alongside the Union Pacific freight railroad's Wilmington Subdivision (the historic route of the Pacific Electric Railway), at its intersection with Compton Boulevard, after which the station is named, in the city of Compton, California.

== Service ==
=== Hours and frequency ===
A Line service hours are from approximately 4:30 a.m. and 11:45 p.m. daily. Trains operate every 8 minutes during peak hours, Monday to Friday. Trains run every 10 minutes, during midday on weekdays and weekends, from 9:00 a.m. to 7:00 p.m. Night and early morning service is approximately every 20 minutes every day.

=== Connections ===
On May 8, 2011, Metro and City of Compton officials opened the new Martin Luther King Jr. Transit Center adjacent to Compton station. The transit center has eight new bus bays and allows easy and safe access to the rail station.

As of December 15, 2024, the following connections are available:

- Compton Renaissance Transit: 1, 2, 3, 4, 5
- GTrans (Gardena): 3
- Greyhound Lines
- Los Angeles Metro Bus: 125, 127, 128, 202
- Metro Micro: Watts/Compton Zone

== Notable places nearby ==
The station is within walking distance of the following notable places:

- Compton Civic Center and Dr. Martin Luther King Jr. Memorial
- Compton High School
- Gateway Towne Center
