= Del Amo station =

Los Angeles Metro Rail station

Del Amo
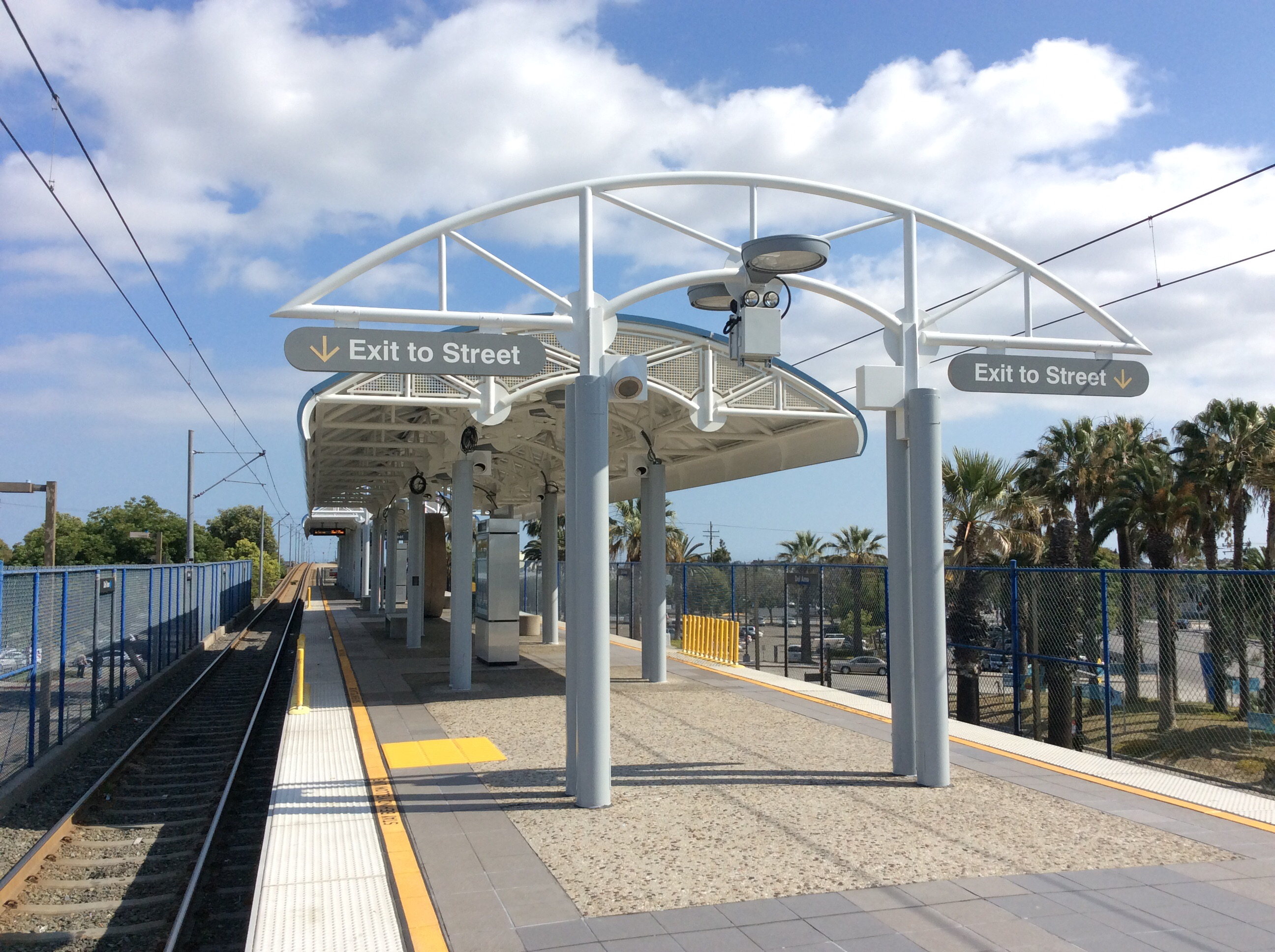
- Del Amo station platform in 2015

General information
- Location: 20220 Santa Fe Avenue; Rancho Dominguez, California
- Coordinates: 33.8495°N 118.2120°W
- Owner: Los Angeles County Metropolitan Transportation Authority
- Platforms: 1 island platform
- Tracks: 2
- Connections: Galaxy Express; Long Beach Transit; Los Angeles Metro Bus

Construction
- Structure type: Elevated
- Parking: 362 spaces
- Cycle facilities: Racks and lockers
- Accessible: Yes

History
- Opened: July 14, 1990; 36 years ago
- Rebuilt: June 1, 2019

Passengers
- FY 2025: 1,404 (avg. wkdy boardings)

Services
Preceding station	Metro Rail	Following station
Wardlow toward Downtown Long Beach	A Line	Artesia toward Pomona
Former services
Preceding station	Pacific Electric	Following station
Cota toward Morgan Avenue	Long Beach	Dominguez Junction toward Pacific Electric Building
Cota toward Balboa	Balboa	Dominguez Junction toward Pacific Electric Building
Location

Del Amo station is an elevated light rail station on the A Line of the Los Angeles Metro Rail system. The station is located between Compton Creek and Santa Fe Avenue, and elevated over the intersection of Del Amo Boulevard, after which the station is named, in the Los Angeles County community of Rancho Dominguez and near the city of Carson.

Del Amo station provides access to Dignity Health Sports Park (home stadium for the LA Galaxy of Major League Soccer) via the Galaxy Express shuttle operated by Long Beach Transit on game days during soccer season.

During the 2028 Summer Olympics, the station will serve spectators traveling to and from venues located at the Dignity Health Sports Park, site of the rugby, modern pentathlon, tennis, track cycling, and field hockey competitions.

Del Amo is the only elevated A Line station that was not originally built to handle three car trains. The northern end of the platform was lengthened in 2000.

The A Line maintenance and storage yard is located between the Wardlow and Del Amo stations.

== Service ==
=== Hours and frequency ===
A Line service hours are from approximately 4:30 a.m. and 11:45 p.m. daily. Trains operate every 8 minutes during peak hours, Monday to Friday. Trains run every 10 minutes, during midday on weekdays and weekends, from 9:00 a.m. to 7:00 p.m. Night and early morning service is approximately every 20 minutes every day.

=== Connections ===
As of December 15, 2024, the following connections are available:

- Galaxy Express (service to home games at Dignity Health Sports Park)
- Long Beach Transit: 1, 4, 191, 192
- Los Angeles Metro Bus: 202

== Notable places nearby ==
- Del Amo Swap Meet
- Dignity Health Sports Park
- VELO Sports Center
