= Los Angeles streets, 11–40 =

This article covers streets in Los Angeles, California between and including 11th Street and 40th Street. Major streets have their own linked articles; minor streets are discussed here.

These streets run parallel to each other, roughly east–west.

Streets change from west to east (for instance West 11th Street to East 11th Street) at Main Street.

Washington, 26th, and 37th/Bandini have crossings over the Los Angeles River

== 11th Street ==
Eleventh street has been renamed Chick Hearn Court between L. A. Live Way and Figueroa Street.

== 13th Street ==
Thirteenth street has been renamed Pico Boulevard.

== 16th Street ==
Sixteenth street has been renamed Venice Boulevard west of Main Street.

== 19th Street ==
Nineteenth street has been renamed Washington Boulevard

== 23rd Street ==
One Metro E Line station:

- LATTC/Orthopedic Institution

== 26th Street ==
Twenty-sixth Street has been renamed Adams Boulevard.

From Long Beach Boulevard to Main Street, it is East Adams Boulevard. At Main Street, it changes to West Adams Boulevard. It ends at La Cienega Boulevard, where it intersects with Washington Boulevard. Metro Local line 55 run on East Adams Boulevard; Metro Local line 37 runs on West Adams Boulevard. East of Santa Fe Avenue, 26th Street is an industrial street that crosses the Los Angeles River, parallels the BNSF Railyard, and runs into Commerce.

== 34th Street ==
Thirty-fourth street has been renamed Jefferson Boulevard.

== 37th Street ==
Thirty-seventh street is renamed Bandini Boulevard east of the Los Angeles River, which it crosses.

== 40th Street ==
Fortieth street had been renamed Santa Barbara Avenue, which has itself been renamed Martin Luther King Jr. Boulevard in 1983. It is served by Metro Local line 40 and a K Line underground station at Crenshaw Boulevard.

== See also ==
- Los Angeles streets, 1–10
- Los Angeles streets, 41–250
- Los Angeles avenues
- List of streets in Los Angeles
