= Rosecrans Avenue =

Street in Los Angeles

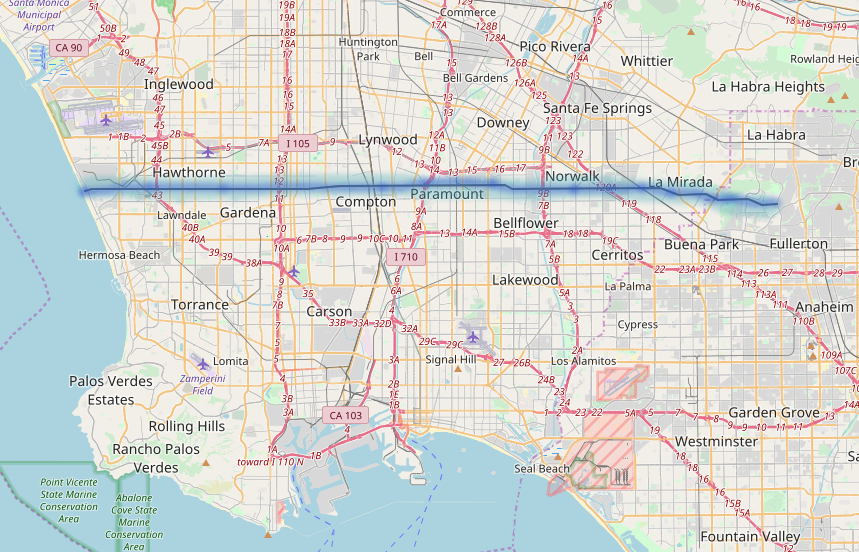
- A map with Rosecrans Avenue highlighted in blue
- Namesake: William Rosecrans
- Maintained by: Local jurisdictions
- Length: 27.5 mi (44.3 km)
- Nearest metro station: : Rosecrans; Douglas
- West end: The Strand in Manhattan Beach
- Major junctions: SR 1 in Manhattan Beach; I-405 in Hawthorne; I-110 in Los Angeles; I-710 in Paramount; SR 19 in Bellflower; I-605 in Norwalk; I-5 in Norwalk; CR N8 in La Mirada; SR 39 in La Mirada
- East end: Euclid Street in Fullerton

Rosecrans Avenue is a major west-east thoroughfare in Los Angeles and Orange Counties, california, United States. It has a total length of 27.5 miles (44.3 km). The street is named after U.S. Union General William S. Rosecrans, who purchased 13,000 acres (5,300 ha) of Rancho Sausal Redondo southwest of Los Angeles in 1869. Rosecrans Avenue was originally named Drexel Avenue, and ran through the Rosecrans Rancho which is part of modern-day Gardena.

== Route description ==
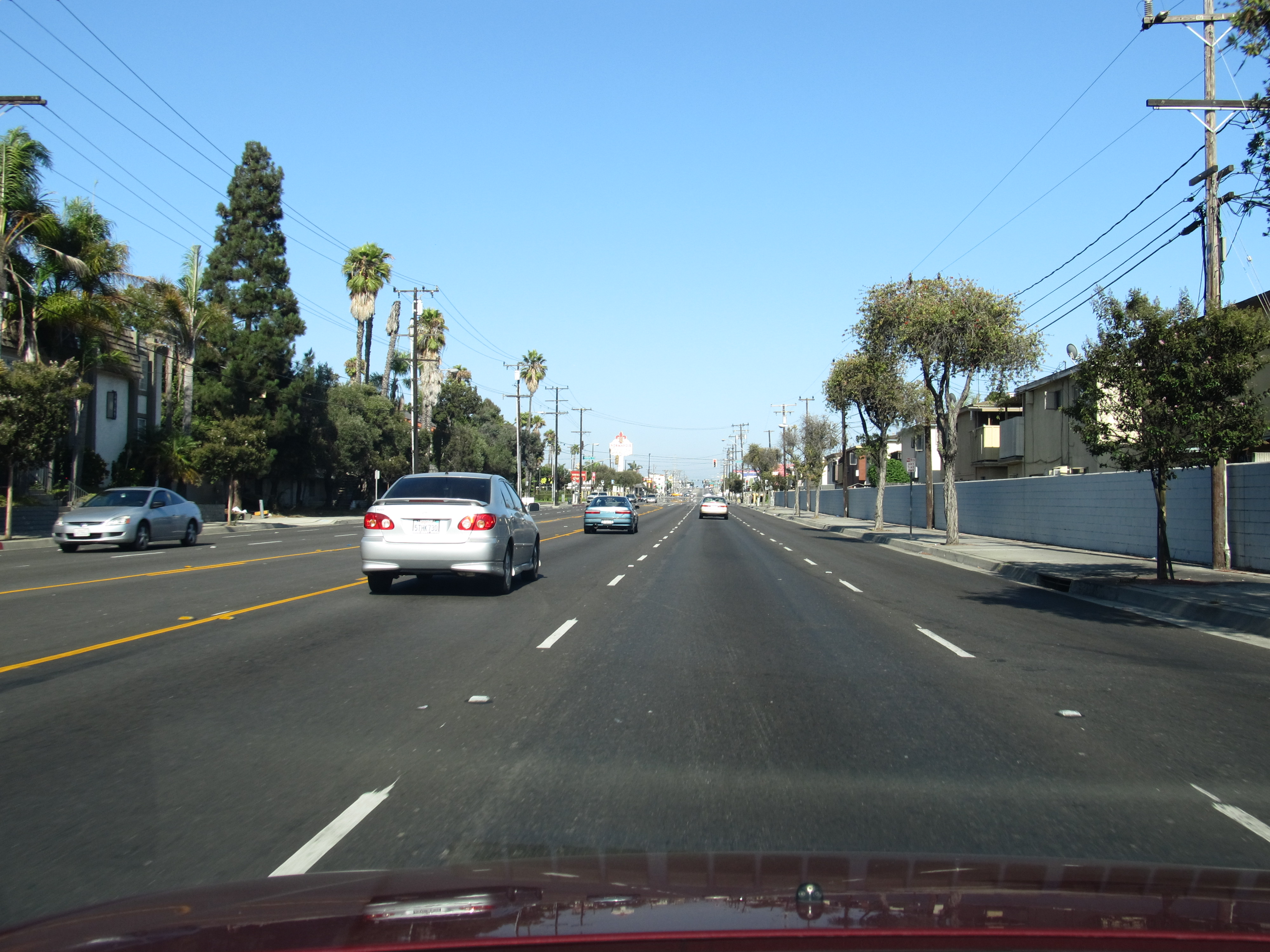
Rosecrans Avenue in Gardena, California

Rosecrans Avenue begins at the beach near El Porto in Manhattan Beach. On its route, it crosses through Manhattan Beach, El Segundo (northside of street only), Hawthorne, Lawndale, Gardena, Harbor Gateway, Willowbrook, Compton, East Rancho Dominguez, Paramount, Downey (for one block between Century Blvd and Lakewood Blvd/SR-19), Bellflower, Norwalk, Santa Fe Springs, La Mirada, Buena Park (southside of street only; Fullerton and La Mirada connect on the northside near Beach Blvd/SR-39), and Fullerton where the road ends at Euclid Street (eastern terminus). It intersects the 405, 110, 710, 605, and 5 freeways (all Interstates). Rosecrans is mostly a straight road until the intersection with Clark Avenue in Bellflower and again at Valley View Avenue in La Mirada when it starts to curve through the West Coyote Hills. Rosecrans enters the cities of Fullerton and Buena Park crossing into Orange County after the intersection with Beach Boulevard. Rosecrans Avenue enters Buena Park approaching Ralph B. Clark Regional Park before entering Fullerton halfway the park (no signs indicate where La Mirada ends and Buena Park begins/ends; there is one for where Fullerton begins on the southside of street).

From Lakewood Boulevard in Downey/Bellflower to Valley View Avenue in Santa Fe Springs/La Mirada, Rosecrans is about one mile south of, and runs parallel to Imperial Highway.

Rosecrans at Marquardt Avenue in Santa Fe Springs had been considered the most hazardous railroad grade crossing in California because from 2013 to 2019 there were 31 accidents and 6 deaths. As a result, an overpass that takes Rosecrans Avenue up over the train tracks was completed in early 2025. BNSF, Amtrak's Pacific Surfliner and Southwest Chief, and Metrolink's Orange County and 91 lines run towards that crossing.

== Termini ==
- Western terminus, The Strand in Manhattan Beach: 33°54′02″N 118°25′10″W
- Eastern terminus, Euclid Street in Fullerton: 33°53′37″N 117°56′40″W

== Transportation ==
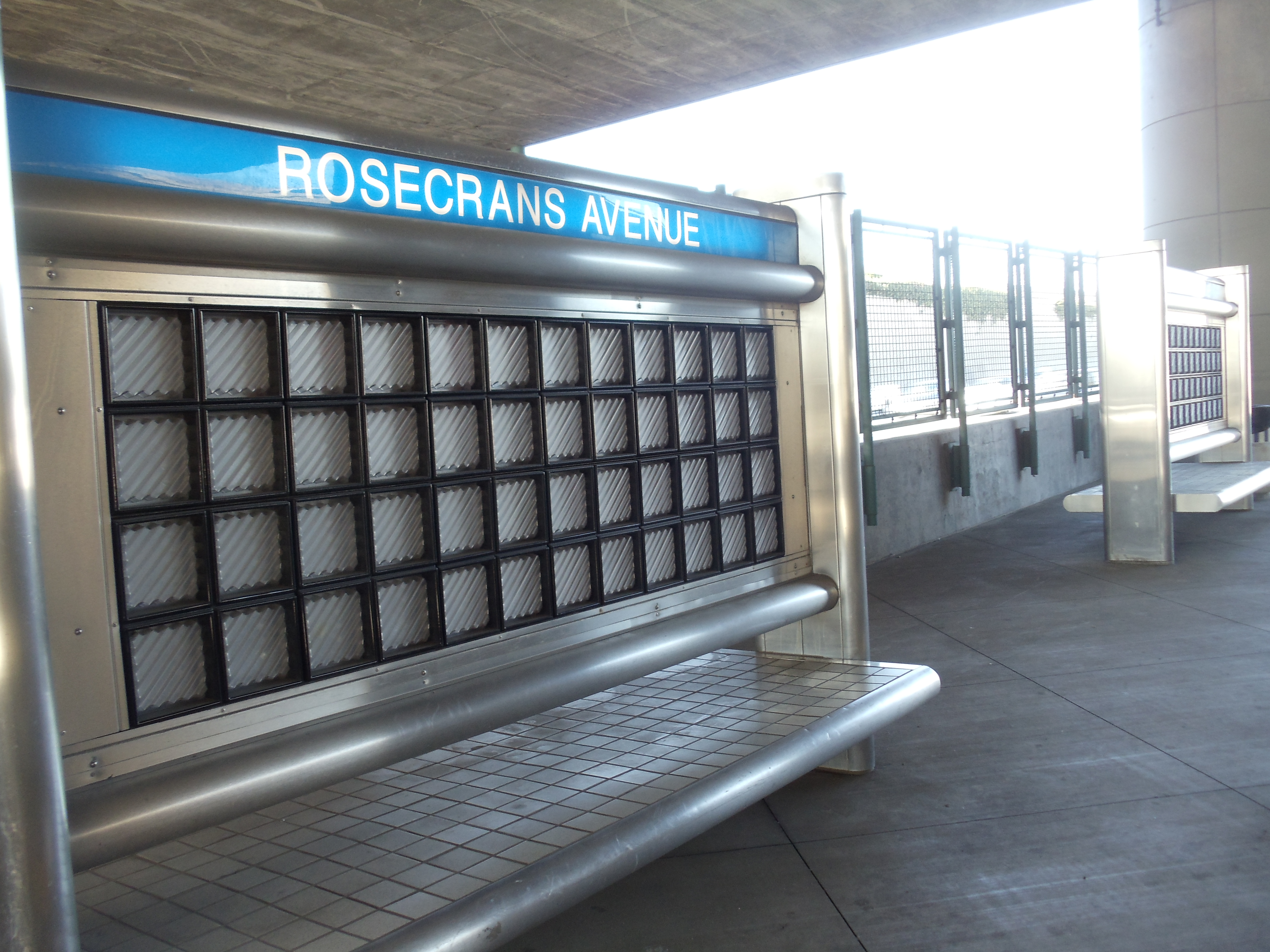
Rosecrans J Line Station

Beach Cities Transit line 109 (between Highland Avenue and Sepulveda Boulevard), Metro Local line 125 (between Sepulveda Boulevard and Norwalk Station) and Norwalk Transit line 5 (east of Norwalk Station) operate on Rosecrans Avenue. The Metro J Line Rosecrans/I-110 station on the Harbor Transitway is located on Interstate 110 below Rosecrans Avenue. At Douglas Street, the Metro K Line serves a station.

== In popular culture ==
Rosecrans Avenue is well known among hip hop culture for its reputation for violence and crime. The street is mentioned by Tupac Shakur in "California Love", as well as "Genocide" and “ETA” by Dr. Dre. Compton native Kendrick Lamar mentions the thoroughfare in numerous songs on his albums good kid, m.A.A.d city, GNX and other earlier material such as Overly Dedicated. Rosecrans is also name-checked in the Bloods & Crips song "Piru Love".

Rosecrans is an album by DJ Quik and Problem named after Rosecrans Avenue.
