= UCLA Health Training Center =

Indoor arena and basketball facility in El Segundo, California, United States

Coordinates: 33.923700°N 118.383789°W

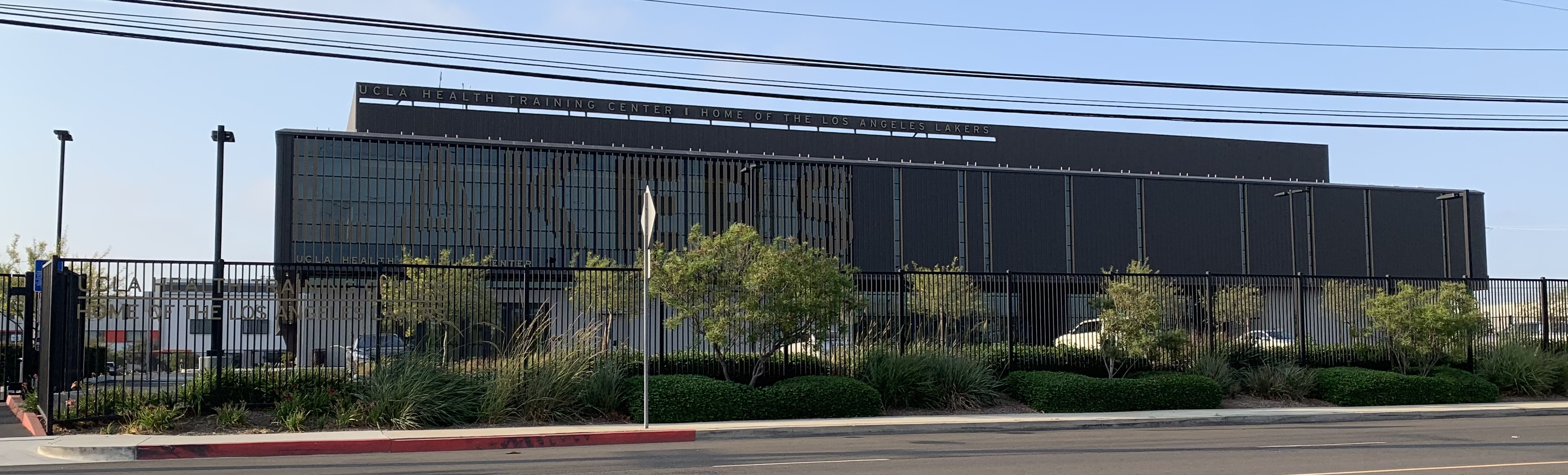

- Location within California Location within the United States
- Address: 2275 East Mariposa Avenue 90245
- Location: El Segundo, California
- Operator: Los Angeles Lakers
- Capacity: Basketball: 750
- Public transit: Mariposa

Construction
- Opened: October 29, 2017
- Architect: Rossetti Architects

Tenant
- South Bay Lakers (NBAGL) (2017–2026)

UCLA Health Training Center is an indoor arena and basketball practice facility located in El Segundo, California. It serves as the training center for the Los Angeles Lakers of the National Basketball Association (NBA). It hosted the South Bay Lakers of the NBA G League from 2017 to 2026. It has a seating capacity of 750 spectators.

On August 31, 2016, it was announced that UCLA Health had signed a five-year naming rights deal with the Los Angeles Lakers. The deal stipulates an option to extend in five-year increments.
