= Artesia Boulevard =

State highway in Los Angeles–Orange Counties, California

- Maintained by: Local jurisdictions
- Nearest metro station: : Artesia; Harbor Gateway Transit Center
- West end: SR 1 (Pacific Coast Highway) in Hermosa Beach
- Major junctions: I-405 in Torrance; I-110 in Los Angeles; I-710 in Long Beach; SR 91 in Cerritos; I-5 in Buena Park
- East end: Gilbert Street in Fullerton

Artesia Boulevard is a west–east thoroughfare in Los Angeles County and Orange County.

== Route description ==
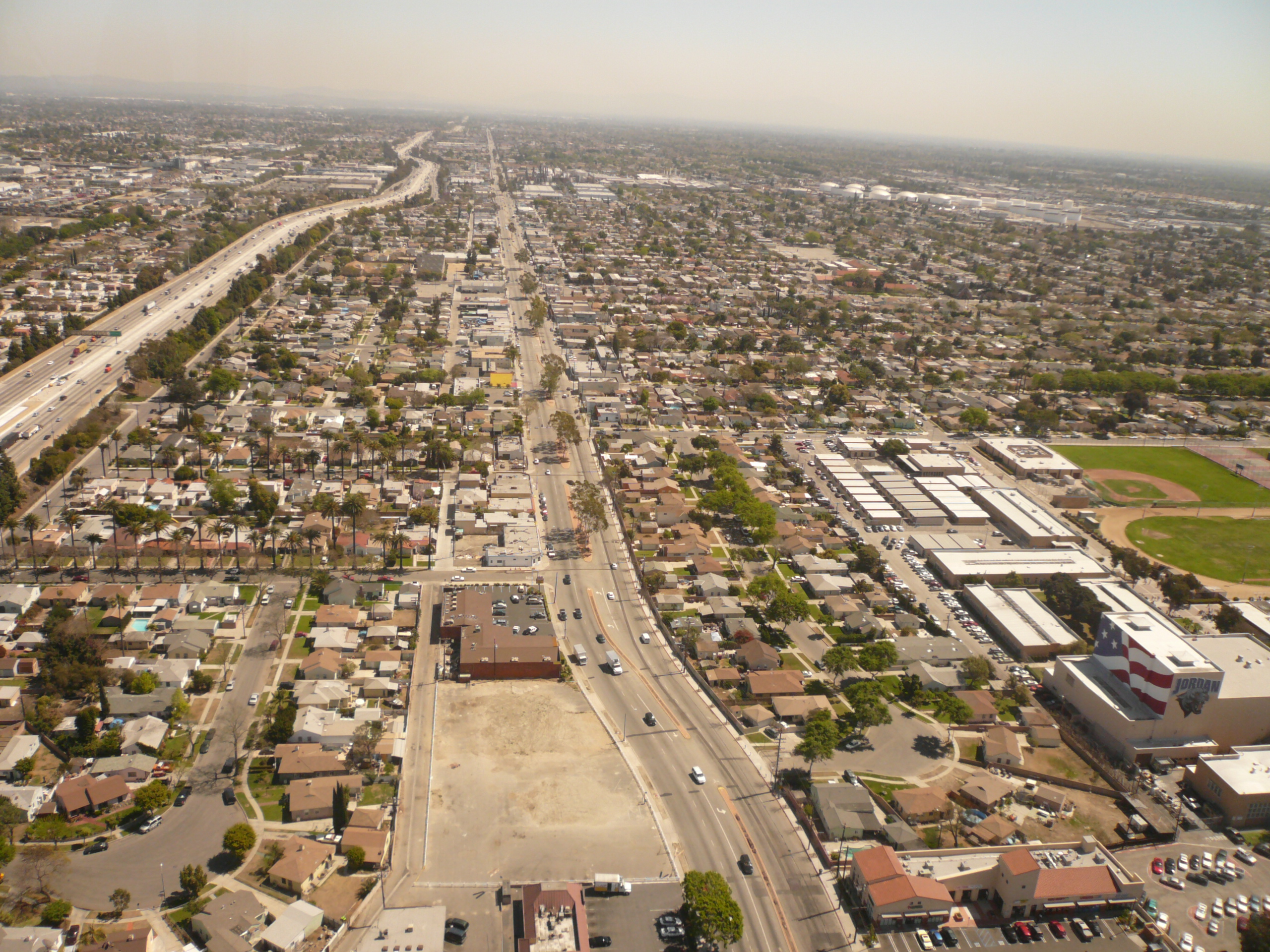
Artesia Boulevard in North Long Beach

Artesia Boulevard begins at the intersection with Pacific Coast Highway. West of this point, Artesia Boulevard becomes Gould Avenue and later 27th Street. The South Bay Galleria is located at the intersection with Hawthorne Boulevard. The westernmost segment of Artesia Boulevard passes through the cities of Hermosa Beach, Manhattan Beach, Redondo Beach, Lawndale, Torrance, Gardena and Los Angeles. Artesia Boulevard breaks off briefly at Avalon Boulevard, and much of this portion of Artesia Boulevard parallels SR 91. After reuniting, the easternmost segment of Artesia Boulevard passes through Carson, Compton, Long Beach, Bellflower, Cerritos, and La Mirada. Artesia Boulevard then crosses the county line upon entering Buena Park and also enters the city Fullerton as Artesia Avenue.

Artesia Avenue terminates at Gilbert Street in Fullerton near the Fullerton Airport.

== History and landmarks ==
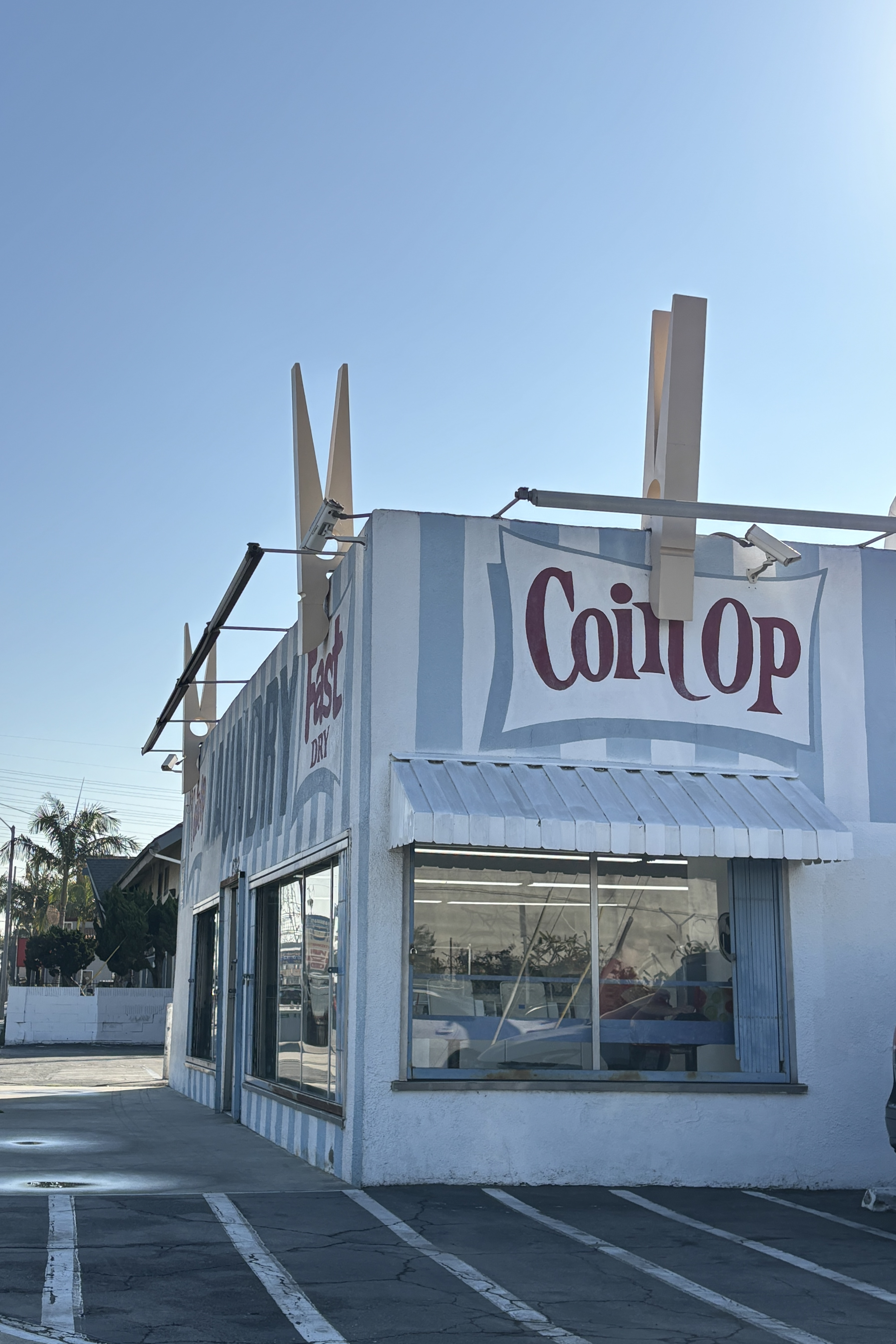
Laundromat on Artesia Boulevard; the oversize clothespins are typical of mid-20th-century roadside-attraction novelty architecture

The road was laid out as state highway as early as 1882, when a newspaper man advised "I was requested by several parties in Artesia to state that the road recently declared a public highway from Artesia to Anaheim and Westminister [sic] has no bridge across Coyotte Creek, and the two fords are through private property, the approaches to which are very steep, and after heavy rains, almost impassable and very dangerous." A bridge was constructed sometime before 1893.

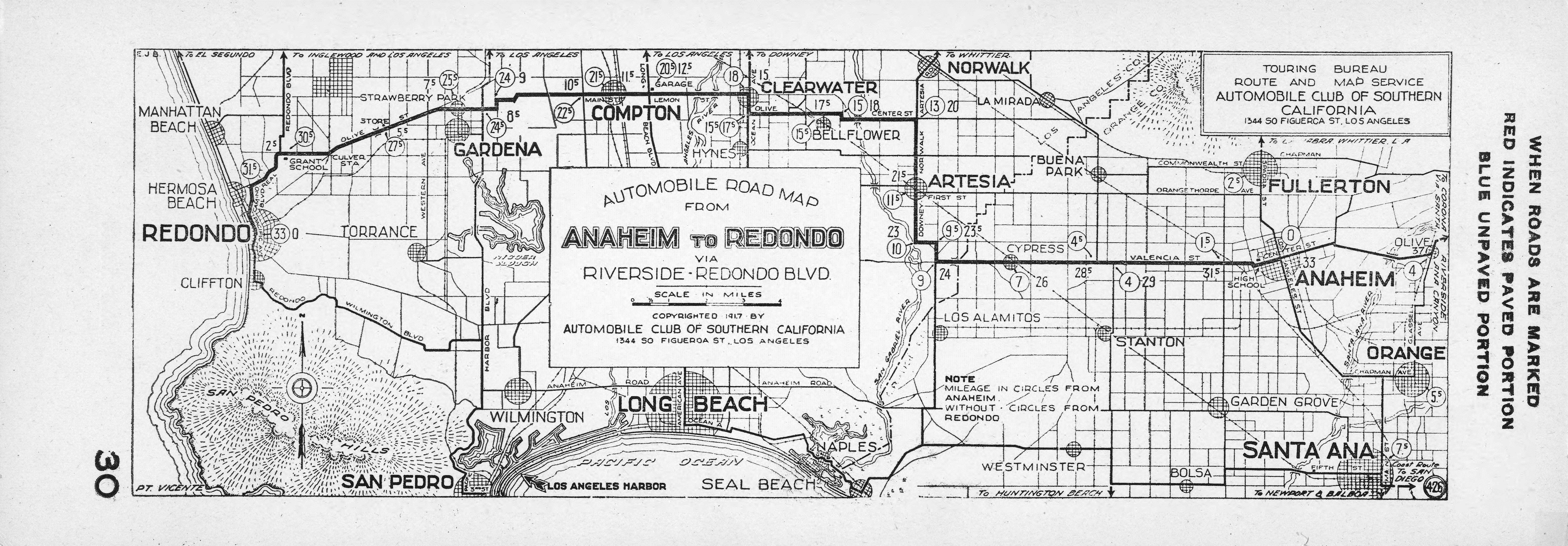
Auto routes from Redondo to Anaheim, 1917

A 1923 real-estate development ad offering lots from the Acposos Park subdivision fronting Artesia claimed that "Artesia Boulevard is a hotbed of subdivision activity." The Southland Home Gardens subdivision on Artesia near Anaheim Boulevard opened in 1924, in close proximity to an oil derrick, and simultaneously with an Artesia Boulevard Improvement Association.

The section in Cerritos was a truck route until 1974 when the city council voted to prohibit trucks to reduce dust and road noise.

The intersection of Artesia and Pioneer Boulevards is the center of a Little India, a South Asian-American community and associated Indian food restaurants.

== Transportation ==
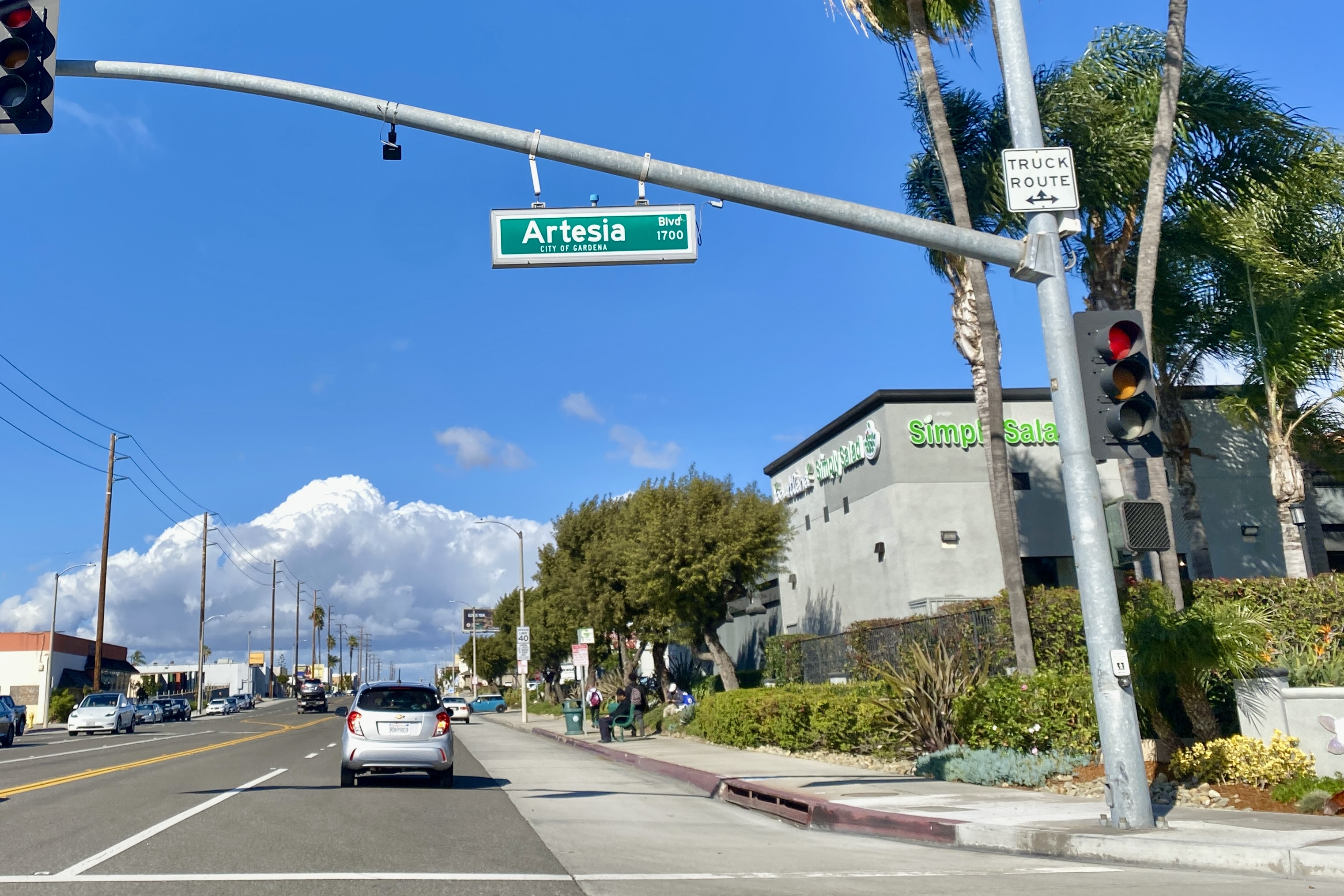
Artesia Boulevard in Gardena

Artesia Boulevard is serviced by Long Beach Transit line 141 between the Metro A Line station (located near its intersection with Acacia Avenue in Compton) and Los Cerritos Center, and Torrance Transit line 13 between the A Line station and Redondo Beach.

The southern end of the Metro J Line, Harbor Gateway Transit Center, was formerly named Artesia Transit Center, based on nearby Artesia Boulevard.

The intersection of Artesia Boulevard and Vermont Avenue is the southern terminus of the Dominguez Channel Bike Path.

== Sister city ==
Through the sister cities project, there is an Artesia Boulevard in Koudekerk ann den Rijn, Netherlands, as well as a Kouderkerk Street in Artesia.
