= Los Angeles Avenues =

Numbered streets in NE Los Angeles

Coordinates: 34°05′N 118°12′W

The Los Angeles Avenues refer to a series of 52 numbered streets in Los Angeles, California in the Northeast and Eastside regions. They are all designated with the word "Avenue" followed by a number such as "Avenue 64." The Avenues are located in the Los Angeles neighborhoods of Lincoln Heights, Cypress Park, Montecito Heights, Glassell Park, Highland Park, Mt. Washington and Eagle Rock. They are not related to 2nd through 13th Avenues west of Arlington Avenue in Jefferson Park and other neighborhoods in South Los Angeles.

The Avenues street gang derives their name from these avenues.

== Geography ==
The avenue numbers generally reflect the Los Angeles street grid beginning with Avenue 16 at the 1600 block north of 1st Street in Downtown through Avenue 67 at the 6700 block in Highland Park. North of the Los Angeles River Pasadena Avenue and Figueroa Street assume the role of Main Street and divide house numbers on streets running east and west. House numbers originate at 100 and increase east or west from that dividing point. For example, 1100 West Avenue 26 is 11 blocks west of Pasadena.

In many places the Avenues do not reflect the grid or the Los Angeles' numbering and naming convention. For example:

- Pasadena Avenue is the east-west dividing street from Avenue 16 though Avenue 38 but Avenues 16 through 25 defy the naming convention and are prefixed "North" for west of Pasadena and "South" for east of Pasadena.
- At Avenue 39 Figueroa Street takes over as the divide and, through Avenue 45, Avenues are prefixed "East"-"West" according to convention but Avenues 49 through 61 revert to the non-conventional "North"-"South" prefixes again.
- Finally the dividing line turns 90 degrees to the right onto York Boulevard (Los Angeles) dividing Avenues 62 through 67 which run due north and south, perpendicular to the lower numbered Avenues to the south.
- Avenues 44 and 45 are actually labeled both North and West in different sections
- In Eagle Rock and Highland Park Avenues 45 through 61 turn due North as they proceed west of the dividing line crossing York Boulevard which runs east and west. They effectively turn the Los Angeles street grid 90 degrees to the east. In many places the grid collides with itself with two intersecting streets bearing the same block number.

== Avenues ==
| Avenue | Range | Original Name(s) | Range of Original Segment(s) | Date Changed | Notes |
|---|---|---|---|---|---|
| Avenue 20 | North Main St (599E) - Pasadena Av (101E) | Walnut St | | Feb 26 1897 | |
| Avenue 25 | Pasadena Av (100W) - Humboldt (299W) | Hamilton Pl | | Feb 26 1897 | |
| Avenue 26 | Griffin Av (399E) - St Fernando Rd (699W) | Hoff St (to Ave 27) Avenue 27 Well St | Griffin (399E) - Pasadena Av (100E) Griffin (399E) - Pasadena Av (100E) Pasadena Av (100W) - St Fernando Rd (699W) | Feb 26 1897 Apr 22 1901 Feb 26 1897 | Lincoln/Cypress Metro station (A Line) |
| Avenue 27 | E of Barranca St (130W) - Barranca St (199W) Idell St (600W) - Pepper Av (899W) | Tract #9364 Rio Vista Terrace | | 1906 1926 | |
| Avenue 43 | E of Berenice Pl (799E) - W of Figueroa St (199W) El Paso Dr (1400W) - W of El Paso Dr (1409W) E of Toland Way (1469W) - Toland Way (1499W) Eagle Rock Bl (3800W) - York Hill Pl (4215W) | (new) C St Anita Tr (new) Winifred Way | E of Berenice Pl (799E) - Carlota Bl (199E) Carlota Bl (200E) - Figueroa St (100E) Figueroa St (100W) - W of Figueroa St (199W) Eagle Rock Bl (3800W) - York Bl (3899W) York Bl (3900W) - York Hill Pl (4125W) | 1906 Feb 26 1897 Feb 26 1897 Jan 9 1925 Apr 17 1924 | Lummis House, Montecito Heights |
| Avenue 46 | | | | | |
| Avenue 57 | Carlota Bl (412E) - Highgate Av (1599W) | Avenue 58 Walnut St Ash St Ash St Ash St Ash St Hill Addition | Carlota (412E) - Figueroa (100E) Figueroa (100W) - Aldama (499W) Aldama (500W) - Fayette (899W) Fayette (900W) - Meridian (999W) Meridian (1000W) - Rangeview (1199W) Rangeview (1200W) - Eaton (1325W) Eaton (1326W) - Highgate (1599W) | Jan 10, 1900 Feb 26, 1897 Jun 2, 1908 May 6, 1912 Apr 7, 1920 Nov 4, 1920 Sep 10, 1920 | Highland Park Metro station (A Line) |
| Avenue 58 | Carlota Bl (200E) - N of Carlota Bl (291E) Benner St (250E) - N of Benner St(200E) S of Figueroa (153E) - Figueroa (100E) Figueroa (100W) - Monte Vista (299W) | Morton Valley Griffith Tract Laurel | | Sep 10 1912 Sep 10 1912 1902 Jan 10 1910 | |
| Avenue 67 | Elgin St (500W) - Ferrara St (599W) Hough St (800W) - Comet St (999W) S of Gold Pl (1000W) - N of Gold Pl (1099W) | Birdwood Tr Tract #15615 Parque Tract | | 1921 1923 1925 | |

== See also ==
- Los Angeles streets, 1–10
- Los Angeles streets, 11–40
- Los Angeles streets, 41–266
- Northeast Los Angeles
- List of streets in Los Angeles
