= El Segundo station =

Light rail station in El Segundo, California

El Segundo
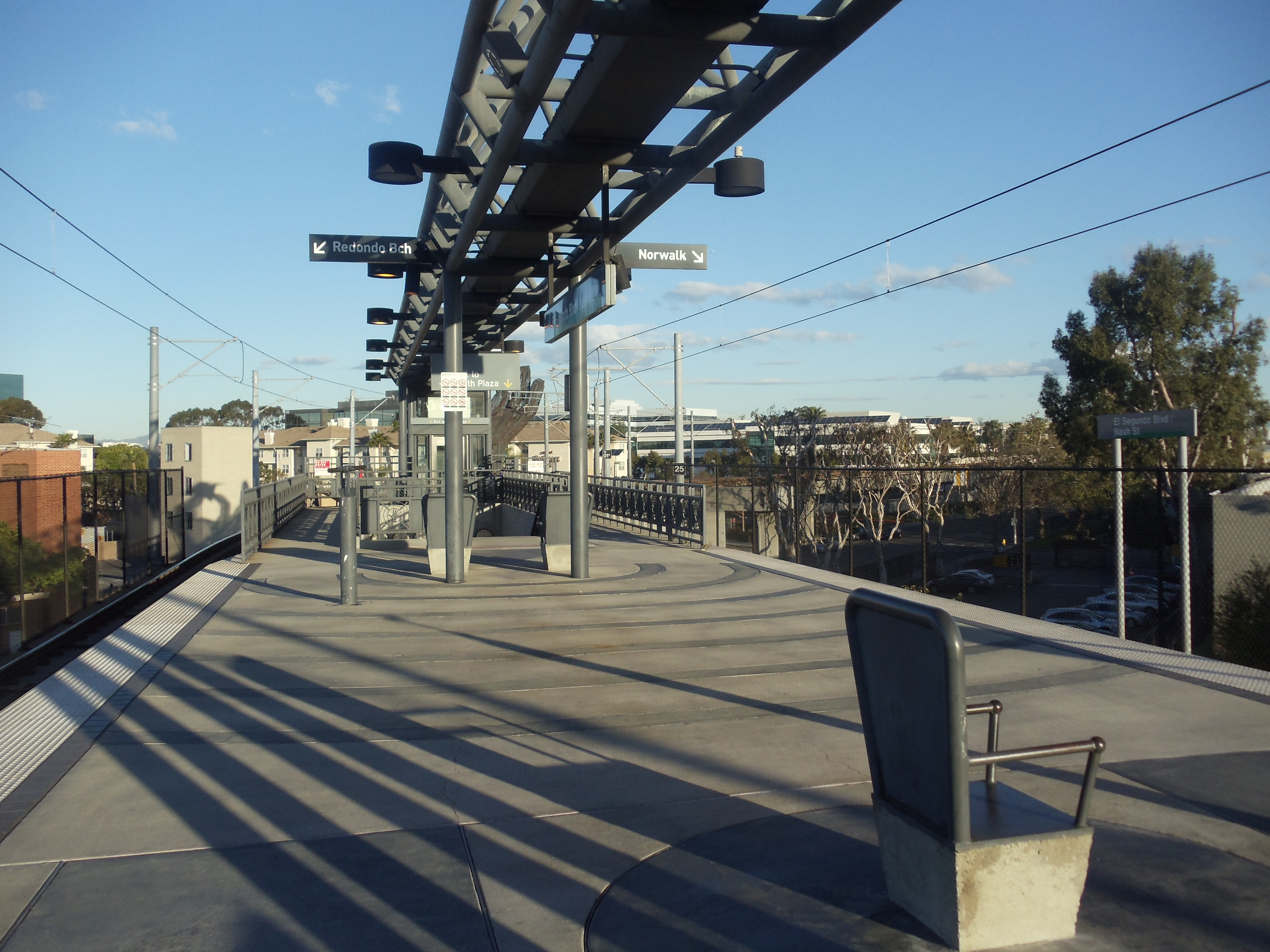
- El Segundo station platform, 2012

General information
- Location: 2226 East El Segundo Boulevard; El Segundo, California
- Coordinates: 33.916°N 118.387°W
- Owner: Los Angeles County Metropolitan Transportation Authority
- Platforms: 1 island platform
- Tracks: 2
- Connections: LADOT Commuter Express; Metro Micro; Torrance Transit

Construction
- Structure type: Elevated
- Parking: 93 spaces
- Cycle facilities: Racks and lockers
- Accessible: Yes

History
- Opened: August 12, 1995
- Former names: El Segundo Blvd/Nash St (1995–2003)

Passengers
- FY 2026: 359 (avg. wkdy boardings)

Services
Preceding station	Metro Rail	Following station
Mariposa toward Expo/Crenshaw	K Line	Douglas toward Redondo Beach
Former services
Preceding station	Metro Rail	Following station
Douglas toward Redondo Beach	C Line	Mariposa toward Norwalk
Location

El Segundo station is an elevated light rail station on the K Line of the Los Angeles Metro Rail system. It is located over El Segundo Boulevard, after which the station is named, near its intersection with Nash Street in El Segundo, California. It opened with the commencement of Green Line service on August 12, 1995. The station has been served by the K Line since a restructuring in November 2024.

The station was initially named El Segundo Blvd/Nash St but was later simplified to El Segundo in 2003.

The station sits on the northeastern corner of the Raytheon Intelligence & Space campus. It is also close to the Los Angeles Air Force Base, The Aerospace Corporation campus, and the future training facility for the Los Angeles Chargers.

The station is currently the only one on the original El Segundo Green Line alignment with a platform long enough to accommodate a three-car train. The remaining stations are planned to be lengthened by 2028 to accommodate longer three-car trains.

== Service ==
=== Hours and frequency ===
K Line service hours are approximately from 4:30 a.m. until 12:00 a.m. daily. Trains operate every 10 minutes throughout most of the day. Trains run every 20 minutes after 8:00 p.m. every day and before 8:00 a.m. on weekends.

=== Connections ===
As of June 6, 2025, the following connections are available:

- LADOT Commuter Express: 439, 574
- Metro Micro: LAX/Inglewood Zone
- Torrance Transit: 8

== Notable places nearby ==
The station is within walking distance of the following notable places:

- The Aerospace Corporation campus
- The Bolt - Los Angeles Chargers practice facility
- Los Angeles Air Force Base
- Raytheon Intelligence & Space campus
