= Douglas station (Los Angeles Metro) =

Light rail station in El Segundo, California

Douglas
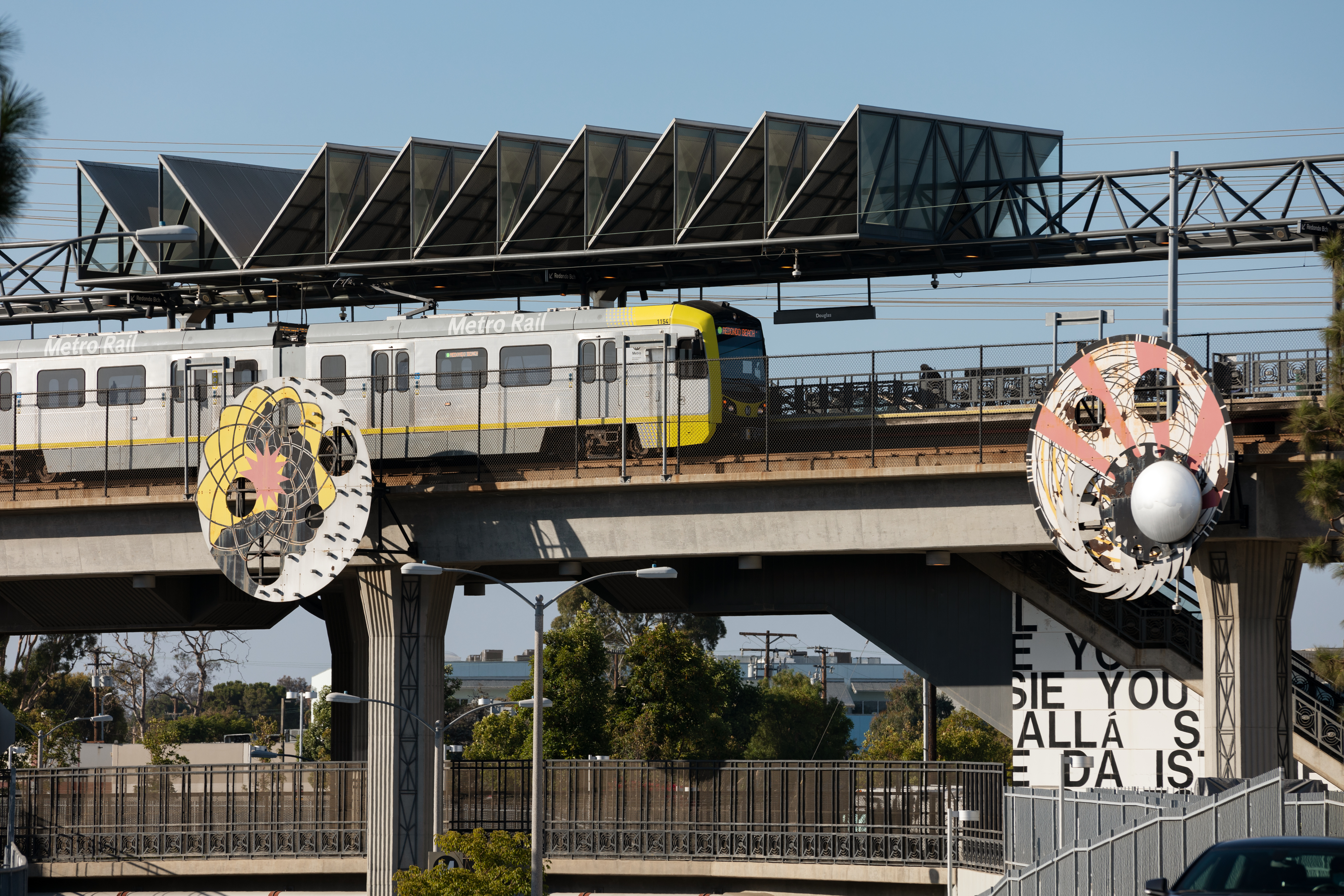
- C Line train at Douglas station, 2020

General information
- Location: 700 South Douglas Street; El Segundo, California
- Coordinates: 33.9052°N 118.3832°W
- Owner: Los Angeles County Metropolitan Transportation Authority
- Platforms: 1 island platform
- Tracks: 2
- Connections: Beach Cities Transit; Los Angeles Metro Bus

Construction
- Structure type: Elevated
- Parking: 30 spaces
- Cycle facilities: Racks and lockers
- Accessible: Yes

History
- Opened: August 12, 1995
- Former names: Douglas St/Rosecrans Ave (1995–2003)

Passengers
- FY 2026: 324 (avg. wkdy boardings)

Services
Preceding station	Metro Rail	Following station
El Segundo toward Expo/Crenshaw	K Line	Redondo Beach Terminus
Former services
Preceding station	Metro Rail	Following station
Redondo Beach Terminus	C Line	El Segundo toward Norwalk
Location

Douglas station is an elevated light rail station on the K Line of the Los Angeles Metro Rail system. It is located over Douglas Street, after which it is named, near Park Place and one block north of Rosecrans Avenue in El Segundo, California. It opened with the commencement of Green Line service on August 12, 1995. The station has been served by the K Line since a restructuring in November 2024.

The station was initially named Douglas/Rosecrans Ave but was later simplified to Douglas in 2003. This station was renovated in 2006 as part of street improvements in the area. On February 14, 2025, Metro approved the motion to rename the Douglas station to Rosecrans/Douglas station in the near future.

The train platform, currently suitable for two-car trains, is planned to be lengthened by 2028 to accommodate longer three-car trains.

== Public Artwork ==
Renée Petropoulos explores the notion of a location’s identifying landmarks at the Rosecrans Douglas Station. Large vibrantly colored medallions, or shields, reflect the neighborhood’s industrial landscape and complex machinery, transforming the station into a bold landmark. A sculptural air-ventilator tower circles above the station while the girders supporting the canopy resemble crisscrossing electrical towers. Benches resemble industrial tools and gears.

== Service ==
=== Hours and frequency ===
K Line service hours are approximately from 4:30 a.m. until 12:00 a.m. daily. Trains operate every 10 minutes throughout most of the day. Trains run every 20 minutes after 8:00 p.m. every day and before 8:00 a.m. on weekends.

=== Connections ===
As of June 6, 2025, the following connections are available:

- Beach Cities Transit: 109
- Los Angeles Metro Bus: 125
