= El Segundo Boulevard =

- Maintained by: Local city jurisdictions; Los Angeles County Department of Public Works
- Nearest metro station: El Segundo
- West end: Whiting Street in El Segundo; 33.9164°N 118.4207°W
- Major junctions: SR 1 in El Segundo; I-405 in Hawthorne; I-110 in Los Angeles
- East end: Alpine Avenue in Lynwood; 33.9156°N 118.2130°W

El Segundo Boulevard is a west-east thoroughfare in Los Angeles County. It has a total length of 11.9 miles (19.2 km). At one time, it was named Ballona Avenue.

== Geography ==
El Segundo Boulevard begins as a minor street in Lynwood. When it runs through Compton, Willowbrook, Gardena, Hawthorne, and El Segundo, it is in the same position 128th Street would be for much of its existence. It intersects with most of the major north-south boulevards south of Los Angeles, including Pacific Coast Highway, Crenshaw Boulevard, Western Avenue, Vermont Avenue, Figueroa Street, and Avalon Boulevard.

== History ==
El Segundo Boulevard was widened to accommodate six lanes of traffic, with paved shoulders, curbs, and gutters, in the late 1950s, to better serve Los Angeles International Airport and the aerospace corporations based near there. The intersection of Compton Avenue and El Segundo Boulevard was reconstructed and widened, with medians and traffic signal improvements, in the early 1970s.

== Transportation ==
Gardena Transit Line 5 runs along El Segundo Boulevard. The Metro K Line serves a station at its intersection with Nash Street.
