= List of Los Angeles Metro Rail stations =

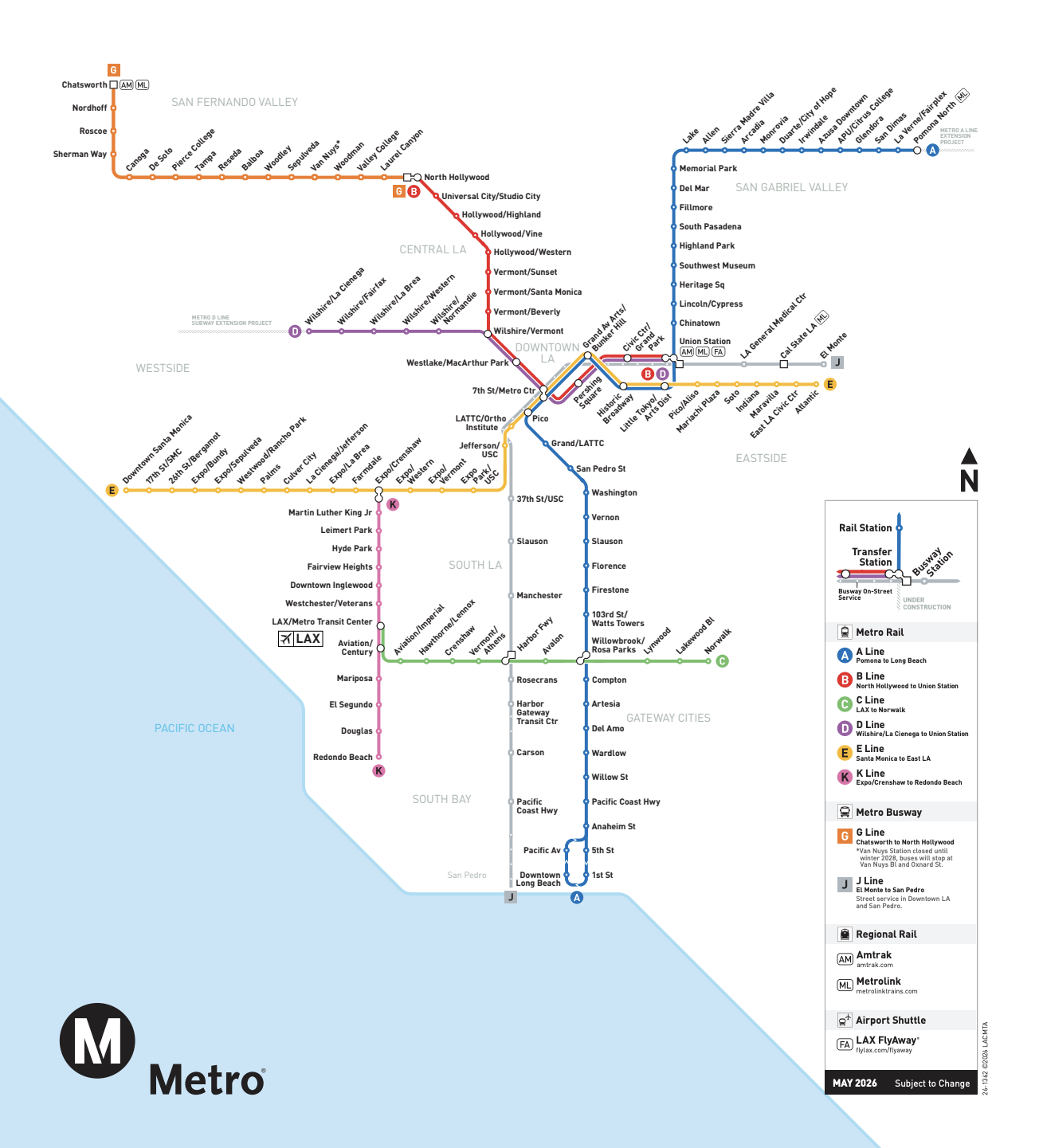
Metro Rail and Busway system map

Metro Rail is an urban rail transit system in Los Angeles County, California. It is operated by Los Angeles Metro. The system includes 110 metro stations on four light rail lines and two rapid transit lines, covering 125.1 miles (201.3 km) of route service. In 2019, the Metro Rail system served an average 295,889 passengers each weekday, totaling 93.2 million passengers in the calendar year. Metro Rail is one of the largest light rail and rapid transit systems in the United States by ridership. The system is complemented by two Metro Busway bus rapid transit lines.

== History ==
Metro Rail began service on July 14, 1990, when the light rail Blue Line opened between Pico and Anaheim Street stations; the line was extended to Downtown Long Beach and Pacific Avenue stations on September 1. The Blue Line was extended one stop northward from Pico to 7th Street/Metro Center on February 15, 1991. The next Metro Rail line, the rapid transit Red Line, opened on January 30, 1993, between Union Station and Westlake/MacArthur Park station. The light rail Green Line, the system's third line, opened on August 12, 1995, from Norwalk to Redondo Beach stations. Metro Rail's next expansion occurred on May 22, 1996, when the Red Line expanded westward from Westlake/MacArthur Park to Wilshire/Western stations. The Red Line expanded again on June 12, 1999, with a branch from Wilshire/Vermont to Hollywood/Vine stations. The final section of the Red Line opened on June 24, 2000, from Hollywood/Vine station to North Hollywood station, completing the Red Line as originally planned. A fourth Metro Rail line, the light rail Gold Line, opened on July 27, 2003, between Union Station and Sierra Madre Villa station in Pasadena. The rapid transit Purple Line became the fifth Metro Rail line on August 24, 2006, when Los Angeles Metro separated the Red Line into two separate services; the branch between Union Station and Wilshire/Western station became the Purple Line while the branch between Union Station and North Hollywood station remained the Red Line. The Gold Line was later extended to Atlantic station in East Los Angeles on November 15, 2009. The light rail Expo Line opened between 7th Street/Metro Center and La Cienega/Jefferson on April 28, 2012; two additional stations opened on June 20, 2012. The Gold Line's second extension opened on March 5, 2016, and added six more stations from Sierra Madre Villa from to APU/Citrus College. An extension to the Expo Line on May 20, 2016, added seven stations. The opening of the K Line on October 7, 2022, added six stations. The Regional Connector project featured two new underground stations as well as a rebuilt Little Tokyo/Arts District station. Aviation/Century station opened on November 3, 2024. The LAX/Metro Transit Center opened on June 6, 2025. The first phase of the A Line Foothill Extension, consisting of four new stations and 9.1 miles (14.6 km) of track, opened on September 19, 2025. Section 1 of the D Line Extension, consisting of three new stations and 3.52 miles (5.66 km) of track, opened on May 8, 2026.

== System ==
The system has 110 stations serving its six lines. 14 stations are transfer stations, which allow passengers to transfer between lines. 11 stations are termini—stations at the end of lines. 57 of the stations are within the city of Los Angeles, and the other 53 stations are located in surrounding communities in Los Angeles County.

=== Lines ===
There are six Metro Rail lines, each of which is associated with a letter.

Name	Stations	Termini	Opening	Newest extension	Length	Ridership (weekday)	Type	Former line name(s)
A Line	48	Pomona North (north); Downtown Long Beach (south)	1990	2025	57.7 miles (92.9 km)	69,216	Light rail	Blue Line; Gold Line; L Line
B Line	14	North Hollywood (north); Union Station (south)	1993	2000	14.7 miles (23.7 km)	64,729 (Note: Ridership data is combined for both the B and D lines.)	Rapid transit	Red Line
C Line	12	LAX/Metro Transit Center (west); Norwalk (east)	1995	2025	17.8 miles (28.6 km)	21,902	Light rail	Green Line
D Line	11	Wilshire/La Cienega (west); Union Station (east)	1993 (Note: Opened as the Red Line, became the Purple Line in 2006.)	2026 (Note: Originally the Wilshire branch of the Red Line.)	9 miles (14 km)	64,729	Rapid transit	Red Line; Purple Line
E Line	29	Downtown Santa Monica (west); Atlantic (east)	2012 (Note: The oldest segment of the E Line opened in 2009 as part of the Gold Line.)	2023	21.9 miles (35.2 km)	48,913	Light rail	Gold Line; Expo Line; L Line
K Line	13	Expo/Crenshaw (north); Redondo Beach (south)	2022	2025	11 miles (18 km)	3,136	Light rail	—N/a

== List of stations ==
For stations served by more than one line, lines are listed in the order of opening.

*	Transfer stations
**	Termini
†	Transfer stations and termini

Station	Image	Line(s)	Location	Date opened	Wkdy. boardings	Character	Ref(s).
1st Street	View of 1st Street station	A Line	Long Beach	September 1, 1990	277	At Grade	
5th Street	View of 5th Street station	A Line	Long Beach	September 1, 1990	332	At Grade	
7th Street/Metro Center*	The tracks for the A and E Lines on the upper level cross over the tracks for the B and D Lines on the lower level, 2025	A Line; B Line; D Line; E Line	Los Angeles (Financial District)	February 15, 1991	25,092	Underground	
17th Street/SMC	The entrance to 17th Street/SMC station	E Line	Santa Monica	May 20, 2016	1,647	At Grade	
26th Street/Bergamot	26th St/Bergamot station platform, July 2025	E Line	Santa Monica	May 20, 2016	1,113	At Grade	
103rd Street/Watts Towers	The platform at 103rd Street/Watts Towers station	A Line	Los Angeles (Watts)	July 14, 1990	1,882	At Grade	
Allen	The platform at Allen station	A Line	Pasadena	July 27, 2003	758	Elevated	
Anaheim Street	The platform at Anaheim Street station	A Line	Long Beach	July 14, 1990	1,789	At Grade	
APU/Citrus College	The platform at APU/Citrus College station	A Line	Azusa	March 5, 2016	744	At Grade	
Arcadia	The platform at Arcadia station	A Line	Arcadia	March 5, 2016	939	At Grade	
Artesia	The platform at Artesia station	A Line	Compton	July 14, 1990	1,643	At Grade	
Atlantic**	The platform at Atlantic station	E Line	East Los Angeles	November 15, 2009	2,070	At Grade	
Avalon	The platform at Avalon station	C Line	Los Angeles (South Los Angeles)	August 12, 1995	1,151	Elevated	
Aviation/Century*	Aviation/Century station platform on opening day	C Line; K Line	Los Angeles (Westchester)	November 3, 2024	2,463	Elevated	
Aviation/Imperial	Aviation/LAX station platform	C Line	Los Angeles (Westchester)	August 12, 1995	1,080	Elevated	
Azusa Downtown	The platform at Azusa Downtown station	A Line	Azusa	March 5, 2016	970	At Grade	
Chinatown	The platform at Chinatown station	A Line	Los Angeles (Chinatown)	July 27, 2003	1,305	Elevated	
Civic Center/Grand Park*	View of the platform at Civic Center/Grand Park station from the mezzanine level	B Line; D Line	Los Angeles (Civic Center)	January 30, 1993	2,150	Underground	
Compton	The platform at Compton station	A Line	Compton	July 14, 1990	1,944	At Grade	
Crenshaw	The platform at Crenshaw station	C Line	Hawthorne	August 12, 1995	1,297	Elevated	
Culver City	The platform at Culver City station	E Line	Culver City	June 20, 2012	2,116	Elevated	
Del Amo	The platform at Del Amo station	A Line	Rancho Dominguez	July 14, 1990	1,421	Elevated	
Del Mar	The platform at Del Mar station	A Line	Pasadena	July 27, 2003	1,063	At Grade	
Douglas	The platform at Douglas station	K Line	El Segundo	August 12, 1995	324	Elevated	
Downtown Inglewood	The platform at Downtown Inglewood station	K Line	Inglewood	October 7, 2022	563	At Grade	
Downtown Long Beach**	The platform at Downtown Long Beach station	A Line	Long Beach	September 1, 1990	2,828	At Grade	
Downtown Santa Monica**	A view of Downtown Santa Monica station, 2017	E Line	Santa Monica	May 20, 2016	4,845	At Grade	
Duarte/City of Hope	A view of Duarte/City of Hope station	A Line	Duarte	March 5, 2016	721	At Grade	
East LA Civic Center	A southbound train at East LA Civic Center Station	E Line	East Los Angeles	November 15, 2009	497	At Grade	
El Segundo	The platform at El Segundo station	K Line	El Segundo	August 12, 1995	359	Elevated	
Expo/Bundy	Expo/Bundy station platform, July 2025	E Line	Los Angeles (Sawtelle)	May 20, 2016	1,567	Elevated	
Expo/Crenshaw†	A westbound train at Expo/Crenshaw station	E Line; K Line	Los Angeles (Jefferson Park)	April 28, 2012	5,058	At Grade (E line), Underground (K line)	
Expo/La Brea	La Brea/Expo Station, under construction in 2011	E Line	Los Angeles (Baldwin Hills)	April 28, 2012	1,552	Elevated	
Expo/Sepulveda	An Expo/Sepulveda station sign	E Line	Los Angeles (Rancho Park)	May 20, 2016	1,765	Elevated	
Expo/Vermont	The eastbound platform at Expo/Vermont station	E Line	Los Angeles (University Park)	April 28, 2012	2,825	At Grade	
Expo/Western	The eastbound platform at Expo/Western station	E Line	Los Angeles (University Park)	April 28, 2012	2,777	At Grade	
Expo Park/USC	The westbound platform at Expo Park/USC station	E Line	Los Angeles (University Park)	April 28, 2012	1,503	At Grade	
Fairview Heights	The platform at Fairview Heights station during the ribbon cutting ceremony on August 20, 2022	K Line	Inglewood / Los Angeles (Hyde Park)	October 7, 2022	333	At Grade	
Farmdale	The westbound platform at Farmdale station	E Line	Los Angeles (Adams)	June 20, 2012	919	At Grade	
Fillmore	Northbound A Line train arriving at Fillmore station	A Line	Pasadena	July 27, 2003	1,018	At Grade	
Firestone	A view of Firestone station from street level	A Line	Florence-Graham	July 14, 1990	1,477	Elevated	
Florence	The platform at Florence station	A Line	Florence-Graham	July 14, 1990	2,404	At Grade	
Glendora	Glendora station platform on opening day	A Line	Glendora	September 19, 2025	480	At Grade	
Grand Avenue Arts/Bunker Hill*	Grand Avenue Arts/Bunker Hill station platform	A Line; E Line	Los Angeles (Bunker Hill)	June 16, 2023	1,885	Underground	
Grand/LATTC	The platform at Grand/LATTC station	A Line	Los Angeles (Historic South Central)	July 14, 1990	2,197	At Grade	
Harbor Freeway	A westbound train at Harbor Freeway station	C Line	Los Angeles (South Los Angeles)	August 12, 1995	3,155	Elevated	
Hawthorne/Lennox	The platform at Hawthorne/Lennox station	C Line	Hawthorne	August 12, 1995	1,313	Below Grade	
Heritage Square	Heritage Square station platforms	A Line	Los Angeles (Cypress Park)	July 27, 2003	480	At Grade	
Highland Park	The platform at Highland Park station	A Line	Los Angeles (Highland Park)	July 27, 2003	1,501	At Grade	
Historic Broadway*	Historic Broadway station platform	A Line; E Line	Los Angeles (Civic Center)	June 16, 2023	1,899	Underground	
Hollywood/Highland	Platform and ceiling design of Hollywood/Highland station, July 2025	B Line	Los Angeles (Hollywood)	June 24, 2000	3,673	Underground	
Hollywood/Vine	Escalators at Hollywood/Vine station	B Line	Los Angeles (Hollywood)	June 12, 1999	2,585	Underground	
Hollywood/Western	Entrance to Hollywood/Western station	B Line	Los Angeles (East Hollywood)	June 12, 1999	2,369	Underground	
Hyde Park	Entrance to Hyde Park station	K Line	Los Angeles (Hyde Park)	October 7, 2022	503	At Grade	
Indiana	A view of Indiana station	E Line	Los Angeles (East Los Angeles)	November 15, 2009	906	At Grade	
Irwindale	A test train running through Irwindale station, 2016	A Line	Irwindale	March 5, 2016	417	At Grade	
Jefferson/USC	A train arriving at Jefferson/USC station	E Line	Los Angeles (University Park)	April 28, 2012	1,351	At Grade	
La Cienega/Jefferson	The platform at La Cienega/Jefferson station	E Line	Los Angeles (Baldwin Hills)	April 28, 2012	1,557	Elevated	
LAX/Metro Transit Center†	LAX/Metro Transit Center platform on opening day	C Line; K Line	Los Angeles (Westchester)	June 6, 2025	3,281	At Grade	
Lake	The exterior of Lake station	A Line	Pasadena	July 27, 2003	1,012	Below Grade	
Lakewood Boulevard	The platform at Lakewood Boulevard station	C Line	Downey	August 12, 1995	1,187	Below Grade	
LATTC/Ortho Institute	The platform at LATTC/Ortho Institute station	E Line	Los Angeles (Historic South Central)	April 28, 2012	2,112	At Grade	
La Verne/Fairplex	La Verne/Fairplex station platform on opening day	A Line	La Verne	September 19, 2025	311	At Grade	
Leimert Park	The Leimert Park station faregates	K Line	Los Angeles (Leimert Park)	October 7, 2022	323	Underground	
Little Tokyo/Arts District*	The platform at Little Tokyo/Arts District station	A Line; E Line	Los Angeles (Little Tokyo)	June 16, 2023 (Note: Little Tokyo/Arts District station originally operated as an at-grade station from 2009 to 2020.)	4,562	Underground	
Lincoln/Cypress	A train at Lincoln/Cypress station	A Line	Los Angeles (Lincoln Heights / Cypress Park)	July 27, 2003	987	Elevated	
Lynwood	A westbound train at Lynwood station	C Line	Lynwood	August 12, 1995	1,283	Elevated	
Maravilla	The platform at Maravilla station	E Line	East Los Angeles	November 15, 2009	392	At Grade	
Mariachi Plaza	An eastbound train at Mariachi Plaza station	E Line	Los Angeles (Boyle Heights)	November 15, 2009	616	Underground	
Mariposa	The platform at Mariposa station	K Line	El Segundo	August 12, 1995	337	Elevated	
Martin Luther King Jr.	The platform at Martin Luther King Jr. station	K Line	Los Angeles (Baldwin Hills / Crenshaw)	October 7, 2022	332	Underground	
Memorial Park	Memorial Park station platforms	A Line	Pasadena	July 27, 2003	1,502	Below Grade	
Monrovia	A view of Monrovia station	A Line	Monrovia	March 5, 2016	808	At Grade	
North Hollywood**	The platform at North Hollywood station	B Line	Los Angeles (North Hollywood)	June 24, 2000	9,317	Underground	
Norwalk**	The platform at Norwalk station	C Line	Norwalk	August 12, 1995	2,097	Below Grade	
Pacific Avenue	The platform at Pacific Avenue station	A Line	Long Beach	September 1, 1990	798	At Grade	
Pacific Coast Highway	A train at Pacific Coast Highway station	A Line	Long Beach	July 14, 1990	1,613	At Grade	
Palms	A westbound train at Palms station	E Line	Los Angeles (Palms)	May 20, 2016	1,038	Elevated	
Pershing Square*	The platform at Pershing Square station	B Line; D Line	Los Angeles (Financial District / Jewelry District)	January 30, 1993	4,469	Underground	
Pico*	The platform at Pico station	A Line; E Line	Los Angeles (South Park)	July 14, 1990	5,683	At Grade	
Pico/Aliso	The platform at Pico/Aliso station	E Line	Los Angeles (Boyle Heights)	November 15, 2009	733	At Grade	
Pomona North**	Pomona North station platform on opening day	A Line	Pomona	September 19, 2025	1,847	At Grade	
Redondo Beach**	Redondo Beach station platform	K Line	Redondo Beach	August 12, 1995	804	Elevated	
San Dimas	San Dimas station platform on opening day	A Line	San Dimas	September 19, 2025	461	At Grade	
San Pedro Street	The platform at San Pedro Street station	A Line	Los Angeles (Historic South Central)	July 14, 1990	1,480	At Grade	
Sierra Madre Villa	Sierra Madre Villa station platform	A Line	Pasadena	July 27, 2003	1,058	At Grade	
Slauson	The platform at Slauson station	A Line	Florence-Graham	July 14, 1990	1,310	Elevated	
Soto	The platform at Soto station	E Line	Los Angeles (Boyle Heights)	November 15, 2009	1,313	Underground	
South Pasadena	The platforms at South Pasadena station	A Line	South Pasadena	July 27, 2003	946	At Grade	
Southwest Museum	The platform at Southwest Museum station	A Line	Los Angeles (Highland Park / Mount Washington)	July 27, 2003	453	At Grade	
Union Station†	The subway platform at Union Station	A Line; B Line; D Line	Los Angeles (El Pueblo)	January 30, 1993 (Note: Union Station began operating as a Metro Rail station on January 30, 1993, but it had been continuously operating as an inter-city and commuter rail station since May 5, 1939.)	12,016	At Grade (A line) Underground (B & D lines)	
Universal City/Studio City	The platform at Universal City/Studio City station	B Line	Los Angeles (Studio City)	June 24, 2000	3,228	Underground	
Vermont/Athens	The westbound platform at Vermont/Athens station	C Line	Los Angeles (Athens / South Los Angeles)	August 12, 1995	1,452	Below Grade	
Vermont/Beverly	The platform at Vermont/Beverly station, 2016	B Line	Los Angeles (Koreatown)	June 12, 1999	1,946	Underground	
Vermont/Santa Monica	The platform at Vermont/Santa Monica station, 2016	B Line	Los Angeles (East Hollywood)	June 12, 1999	2,373	Underground	
Vermont/Sunset	Vermont/Sunset station platform and ceiling design	B Line	Los Angeles (East Hollywood)	June 12, 1999	2,249	Underground	
Vernon	The platform at Vernon station	A Line	Los Angeles (South Los Angeles)	July 14, 1990	1,621	At Grade	
Wardlow	The platform at Wardlow station	A Line	Long Beach	July 14, 1990	777	At Grade	
Washington	The platform at Washington station	A Line	Los Angeles (South Los Angeles)	July 14, 1990	974	At Grade	
Westchester/Veterans	Side view of Westchester/Veterans station	K Line	Inglewood / Los Angeles (Westchester)	October 7, 2022	402	At Grade	
Westlake/MacArthur Park*	The mezzanine level at Westlake/MacArthur Park station	B Line; D Line	Los Angeles (Westlake)	January 30, 1993	5,019	Underground	
Westwood/Rancho Park	The platform at Westwood/Rancho Park station	E Line	Los Angeles (Rancho Park)	May 20, 2016	1,251	At Grade	
Willow Street	A train at Willow Street station	A Line	Long Beach	July 14, 1990	1,420	At Grade	
Willowbrook/Rosa Parks*	A Line platform at the Willowbrook/Rosa Parks station	A Line; C Line	Willowbrook	July 14, 1990	7,926	Elevated (C line) At Grade (A line)	
Wilshire/Fairfax	Wilshire/Fairfax station platform on opening day	D Line	Los Angeles (Beverly Grove / Carthay / Mid-Wilshire)	May 8, 2026	1,677	Underground	
Wilshire/La Brea	Wilshire/La Brea station platform on opening day	D Line	Los Angeles (Hancock Park / Mid-Wilshire)	May 8, 2026	1,353	Underground	
Wilshire/La Cienega**	Wilshire/La Cienega station platform on opening day	D Line	Beverly Hills	May 8, 2026	2,117	Underground	
Wilshire/Normandie	The platform at Wilshire/Normandie station	D Line	Los Angeles (Koreatown)	May 22, 1996	1,478	Underground	
Wilshire/Vermont*	The main entrance to Wilshire/Vermont station	B Line; D Line	Los Angeles (Koreatown)	May 22, 1996	5,582	Underground	
Wilshire/Western	The platform at Wilshire/Vermont station	D Line	Los Angeles (Koreatown)	May 22, 1996	2,350	Underground	

=== Future stations ===
The following list stations that are currently under construction. It does not include the proposed Arts District/6th Street station, nor those planned on the East San Fernando Valley Light Rail Transit Project, Eastside Transit Corridor, Foothill Extension to Claremont, K Line Extension to Torrance, K Line Northern Extension, Sepulveda Transit Corridor, and the Southeast Gateway Line.

Station	Image	Line(s) (Project name)	Location	Opening	Ref(s).
Beverly Drive	Beverly Drive station under construction in July 2025	D Line (Westside Extension)	Beverly Hills	2027	
Century City	Site of the future Century City station	D Line (Westside Extension)	Los Angeles (Century City)	2027	
Westwood/UCLA	Westwood/UCLA station under construction in August 2023	D Line (Westside Extension)	Los Angeles (Westwood)	2027	
Westwood/VA Hospital**	Westwood/VA Hospital station under construction in August 2023	D Line (Westside Extension)	Los Angeles (Westwood)	2027	
