= Twenty-eight by '28 =

High-priority Los Angeles infrastructure projects

The Twenty-eight by '28 initiative is an effort set forth by former Mayor Eric Garcetti that the City of Los Angeles complete 28 transportation infrastructure projects before the start of the 2028 Summer Olympics on July 14, 2028 and the 2028 Summer Paralympics the following month, part of "Vision 2028" mobility target plans by Los Angeles Metro.

Most of the projects on the original list are funded through Measure R and Measure M and will receive accelerated priority, though several more were proposed by this plan. In December 2018, Los Angeles Metro stated it would need $26.2 billion to complete the list of projects.

In March 2024, the Metro Board substituted 11 projects that could not be implemented in time for the 2028 Olympic and Paralympic Games with 11 projects that would be able to hit this deadline and are in line with the agency's 2028 Mobility Concept Plan.

== List ==
No.	Project	Planned completion	Status
1	"New Blue" Improvements to the A Line (Note: Replacement project.) (Note: Added to list after start of operations.)	2019	Operational
2	Silver Line (J Line) Improvement Program	2020	Operational
3	Crenshaw/LAX Line Transit Project	2022	Operational
4	Regional Connector	2023	Operational
5	Eastside Access Improvements	2023	Operational
6	Airport Metro Connector station	2025	Operational
7	J Line Electrification	2025	Operational
8	Rail to Rail, Segment A	2025	Operational
9	North San Fernando Valley Bus Rapid Transit Project (Note: Originally planned as a single bus rapid transit line from Chatsworth station to North Hollywood station; now a series of targeted upgrades such as increased frequency, transit signal priority, peak period bus only lanes, bus shelters, and bus bulbs along 7 corridors (Roscoe, Lankershim, Sherman Way, Victory, Vanowen, Nordhoff, Reseda).)	2027	Under construction
10	Purple (D Line) Extension Transit Project Section 1	2026	Operational
11	Gold Line (A Line) Foothill Extension to Pomona	2025	Operational
12	Purple (D Line) Extension Transit Project Section 2	2027	Under construction
13	Rosecrans Ave & Marquardt Ave Grade Separation	2025	Operational
14	New Bus Corridors: Broadway, Florence Ave, La Brea Ave, Sunset Blvd	2027	Planned
15	Interstate 5 North Capacity Enhancements: SR 14 – Parker Rd	2027	Under construction
16	Key Downtown Los Angeles Stations: Union, 7th Street/Metro Center	2028	Planned
17	North Hollywood to Pasadena Bus Rapid Transit Project	2028	Under construction
18	Los Angeles River bicycle path: San Fernando Valley (Segments 1 + 2)	2027	Planned
19	G Line Travel Time and Safety Improvements	2027	Under construction
20	Purple (D Line) Extension Transit Project Section 3	2027	Under construction
21	Mobility Hubs in San Fernando Valley: Temporary (Chatsworth station, North Hollywood station) and Permanent (Balboa station)	2028	Planned
22	Gateway Cities Mobility Concept Plan Projects: Mobility hub at Willow Street station; Bus corridor enhancements on Florence Ave, Studebaker Rd, Imperial Hwy; First/last mile enhancements near Norwalk station; Open Streets in Long Beach; Crossover track on A Line between 5th Street station and Anaheim Street station	2028	Planned
23	LRT Speed and Reliability Improvements: A Line and E Line Interlock projects; Washington Blvd & Flower St project	2028	Planned
24	Bus Only Lanes on Olympic Blvd & Venice Blvd	2027	Planned
25	Interstate 105 ExpressLanes Segment 1	2027	Under construction
26	SR 57 & SR 60 Interchange Improvements	2028	Under construction
27	Vermont Transit Corridor Bus Rapid Transit	2028	Under construction
28	Interstate 405 Integrated Corridor Management: Manchester Ave – Rosecrans Blvd	2028	Planned

=== Substituted projects ===
The following 11 projects were included in the original 2018 project list but were removed in March 2024 and substituted with 11 operational/in-progress projects that would better meet the 2028 Olympic and Paralympic Games deadline.

No.	Project
2	Microtransit (Note: Launched in 2020 as a pilot project.)
11	Los Angeles River Waterway and System Bike Path
16	Sepulveda Pass Metro ExpressLanes
17	East San Fernando Valley Light Rail Transit Project
19	Interstate 710 South Corridor Early Action (Note: A "No-Build" alternative was adopted by the Metro Board in 2022.)
20	K Line Extension to Torrance
21	A Line Signal and Washington Blvd & Flower St Junction Improvements (Note: Will instead be built as a cheaper quick-build project.)
22	Interstate 10 ExpressLanes: Interstate 605 – San Bernardino Line
25	Sepulveda Transit Corridor Project
26	Eastside Transit Corridor Phase 2
27	Southeast Gateway Line

== Transportation plan details ==
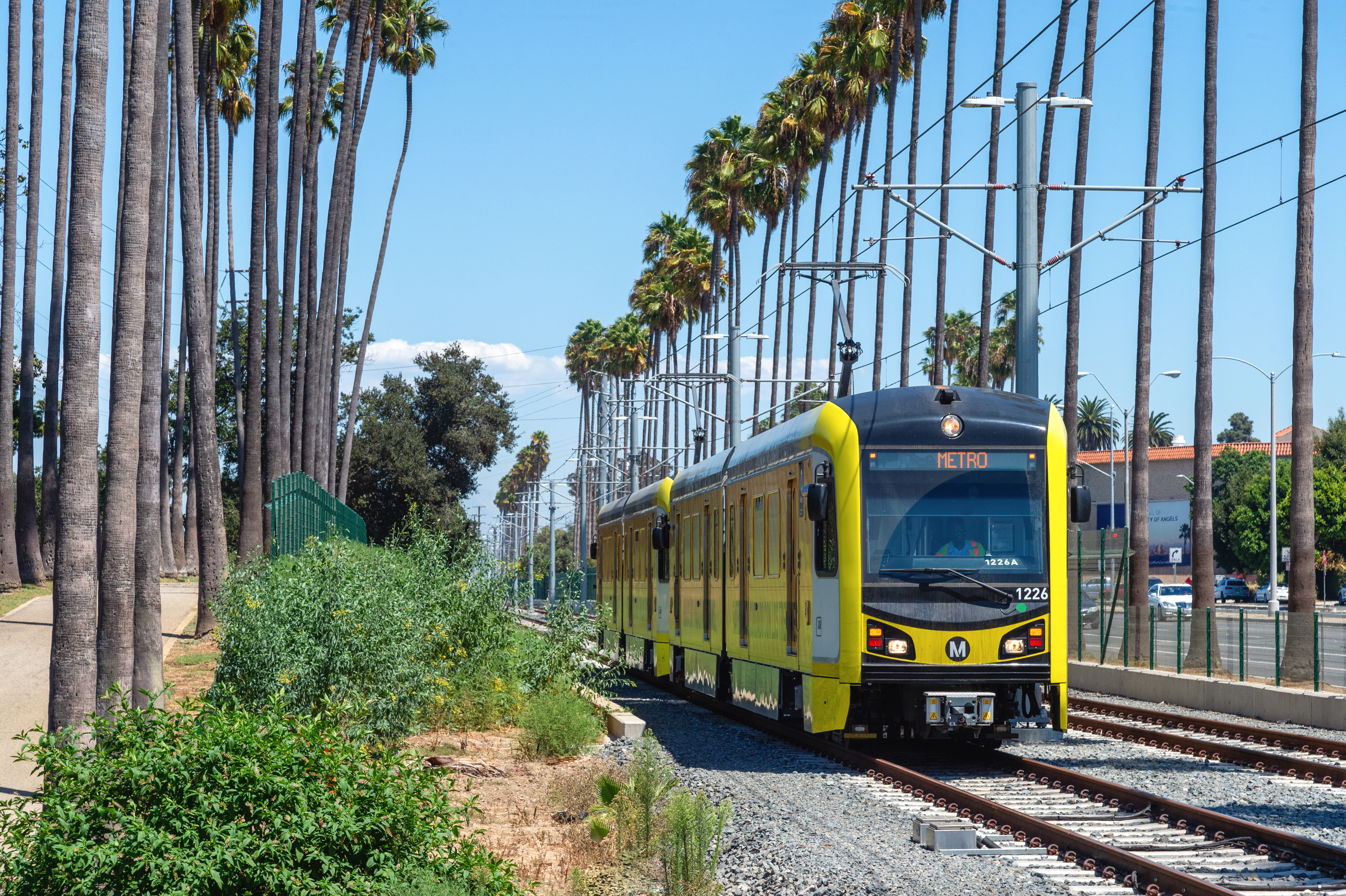
K Line train in Inglewood, a major events cluster

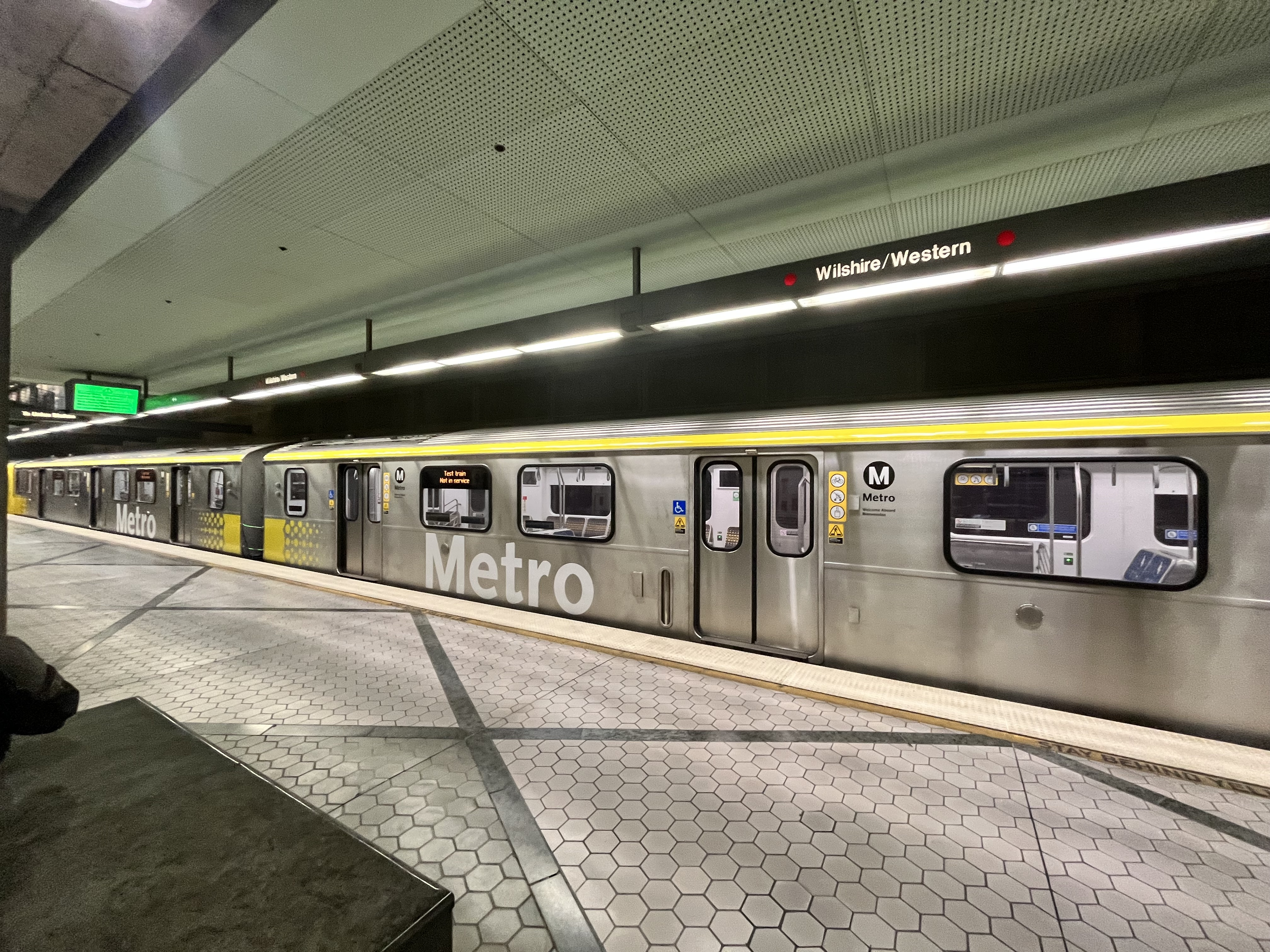
D Line train at Wilshire/Western station

Los Angeles civic leaders initially announced a plan to make the 2028 Olympics "car-free", aiming to reduce congestion, shorten travel times, and comply with security restrictions that limit parking near venues. The Twenty-eight by '28 initiative, launched by former Mayor Eric Garcetti, aimed to complete 28 infrastructure projects before the Games. Most projects were already in planning stages, but the initiative accelerated their completion. Funding comes from Measure R and Measure M, countywide sales tax measures. Mayor Karen Bass also promoted strategies such as encouraging remote work during the event to reduce demand on the transportation network.

By March 2024, the original list of 28 projects was significantly revised, with 11 projects, including 5 rail line expansions, replaced by smaller projects considered more feasible to meet deadlines, including some projects that had already been completed. By late 2024, observers expressed concern that only 5.2% of LA Metro's $3.3 billion Olympic-related project list was funded, and several projects were running behind schedule. Officials also noted uncertainties related to government agency staffing, interagency coordination, and the late finalization of the Olympic venue list. These challenges led civic leaders to pivot away from a fully "car-free" Games toward a "transit-first" approach.

=== Rail projects ===
Several major rail expansions are underway to support Olympic transportation. The D Line Extension is being completed in three phases: the first phase was completed on May 8, 2026. It extended service from Wilshire/Western to Wilshire/La Cienega; the second phase will continue to Century City by late 2026; and the third phase will reach the West Los Angeles VA Medical Center by 2027, including a station near UCLA that will connect the Olympic Village to downtown venues. Construction began in 2014 and remains largely on schedule.

The Regional Connector, completed in 2023, links Metro's light rail lines in downtown Los Angeles, providing easier transfers between lines that serve Long Beach, the San Gabriel Valley, and Santa Monica, all of which will host Olympic competition venues. The K Line, which opened in October 2022 after multiple delays, connects the Crenshaw District, Inglewood, and Westchester, and will connect with a people mover at LAX, now scheduled to open in October 2026 after several postponements.

=== Bus fleet expansion ===
While many venues are located near existing rail lines, Los Angeles lacks the continuous, high-capacity subway system that supported past Olympic Games. Consequently, buses are expected to serve as the primary mode of transportation for most spectators. Los Angeles Metro and Olympic organizers estimate that an additional 2,700 buses will be needed, effectively doubling the current Metro fleet of 2,320 vehicles. Metro has requested that transit agencies nationwide donate buses near the end of their usable life for temporary Olympic service, potentially adding hundreds of vehicles. Costs are estimated at $700 million to $1 billion, and through the Vision 2028 plan, Metro is seeking federal grants and coordinating post-Games resale of buses to other cities. In February 2026, Metro announced that Congress has approved $94.3 million in mobility-related funding, including service planning, station experience enhancements, development of mobility hubs, light rail improvements, and planning and design for pedestrian access near Games venues as part of the Games Enhanced Transit System (GETS).

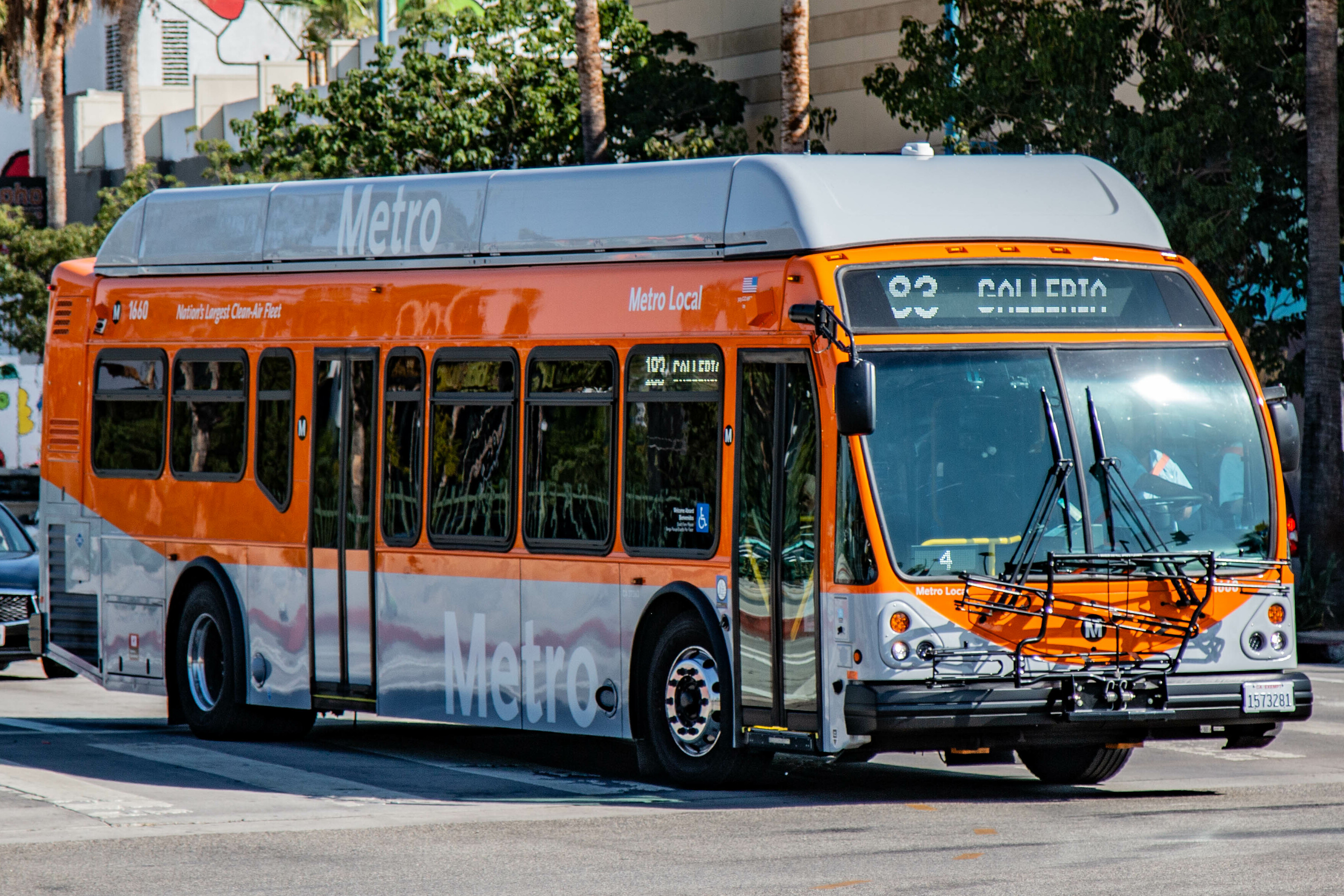
ENC Axess bus operated by LA Metro

Metro's Supplemental Bus System (SBS) and Olympic shuttle network program, Games Enhanced Transit Service (GETS) plan, includes the deployment of 2,700 zero-emission buses, mobility hubs, the hiring over 10,000 new personnel and specified bus lanes. Also, 15 new staging depots, 13 bus staging areas, 25 park-and-ride sites, and a temporary athletes shuttle network, the "Games Route Network" to each venue and sports zone.

The Games Route Network would be in operation for 60 days, from the Olympic Village opening through the end of the Paralympic departure cycle on August 30, 2028. The Games Route Network will be 369 miles of dedicated roadways coordinated by Cal Trans. Restricted to official LA28 permit-holding vehicles. Special blue LA28 markings will identify restricted lanes and venue exits.

== Mobility Hubs & Venues ==
The organizing committee finalized the Olympic venues on April 15, 2025.

Metro has currently designated nine Central Mobility Hubs (CMH) with more potential additions. Most will be located at metro transfer stations, terminal stations and local colleges and universities. Park and ride concept. Central Mobility Hubs will be assigned county wide for game attendees to access Metro Rail via multi-modal modes.

Central Mobility Hub	Location	Line
Chatsworth mobility hub	Chatsworth station	G Line
North Hollywood mobility hub	North Hollywood station	B Line G Line
Willow mobility hub	Willow station	A Line
Willowbrook/Rosa Parks mobility hub	Willowbrook/Rosa Parks station	A Line C Line
Expo/Crenshaw mobility hub	Expo/Crenshaw station	E Line K Line
El Monte mobility hub	El Monte station	J Line
Harbor Gateway mobility hub	Harbor Gateway Transit Center	J Line
Norwalk mobility hub	Norwalk station	C Line
La Cienega/Jefferson mobility hub	La Cienega/Jefferson station	E Line

Metro will also create Venue Mobility Hubs (VMH) at designated metro stations near games venues. Staff will coordinate ways to contain people efficiently while they wait to board transit near venue sites, create visible signage, provide real-time information, and have additional staff available to provide riders with guidance and support. Metro has designated 18 potential venue sites as venue mobility hubs.

The Downtown and Exposition Park zones, including LA Live, Crypto.com Arena, USC, and the Los Angeles Convention Center in the South Park neighborhood, are served by multiple Metro stations, primarily Pico and Expo Park/USC stations. The Valley Zone at Sepulveda Dam Recreation Area is accessible via the G Line's Woodley station and a planned venue mobility hub at Balboa station.

The Long Beach Zone will be served by the A Line, including the 1st Street, Downtown Long Beach, and Pacific Avenue stations. The Carson Zone, South Bay Sports Park is near the A Line's Del Amo station, with shuttle service to venues. In the Inglewood Zone, the Hollywood Park area is served by the K Line's Downtown Inglewood and Fairview Heights stations, with additional connections via the LAX/Metro Transit Center.

Santa Anita Park racetrack stadium is accessible via the A Line's Arcadia station with shuttle service. The Olympic Village at UCLA will be served by the new Westwood/UCLA station on the D Line. The Honda Center in Anaheim is accessible via Metrolink's ARTIC station. Universal City is served by the B Line's Universal City station, and the Fairplex in Pomona is served by the A Line's La Verne/Fairplex station.

Venue	Sport	Stations	Line
DTLA Zone	Boxing; Gymnastics; Fencing; Judo; Table tennis; Taekwondo; Weightlifting; Wrestling	7th St/Metro Center (VMH); Pico (VMH)	A Line B Line D Line E Line J Line
Exposition Park Zone	Athletics (track and field); Badminton; Flag football; Gymnastics; Lacrosse; Opening/closing ceremonies	37th St/USC; Expo Park/USC (VMH); Expo/Vermont (VMH); Jefferson/USC (VMH)	E Line J Line
Carson Zone	Archery; Field hockey; Rugby sevens; Tennis; Track cycling	Del Amo; Victoria Transit Center	via shuttle
Long Beach Zone	Beach volleyball; Canoeing; Handball; Rowing; Sailing; Shooting; Sport climbing; Swimming; Water polo	1st Street (VMH); Downtown Long Beach; Pacific Avenue	A Line
Valley Zone	Basketball; BMX; Modern pentathlon; Skateboarding	Balboa (VMH); Woodley	G Line
Venice Beach	Marathon; Road cycling; Triathlon	Downtown Santa Monica (VMH)	E Line
Los Angeles Harbor/Port	Sailing	Pacific Ave/21 St.	J Line
UCLA	Olympic Village	Westwood/UCLA	D Line
Hollywood Park / Inglewood	Basketball; Main Press Center; Opening ceremony; Swimming	LAX/Metro Transit Center; Hawthorne/Lennox (VMH)	via shuttle
Honda Center	Volleyball	ARTIC	Metrolink: Orange County
Trestles	Surfing	San Clemente Pier	Metrolink: Orange County via shuttle
Santa Anita Park	Equestrian	Arcadia	via shuttle
Fairplex	Cricket	La Verne/Fairplex	A Line
Universal City Lot	Squash	Universal City	B Line
Rose Bowl	Football (soccer); Diving	Memorial Park (VMH)	via shuttle
South El Monte Shooting Center	Shooting	El Monte	via shuttle
Riviera Country Club	Golf	Westwood/UCLA	via shuttle
Dodger Stadium	Baseball	Union Station (VMH)	via shuttle
Warner Bros. Ranch Studio	International Broadcast Center	Olive/Riverside Ave	(under construction)

Metro will also create Supplemental Park & Ride Mobility Hubs, they are temporary high-volume parking lots specifically designed to feed the massive Olympic shuttle bus network and Neighborhood Equity Mobility Hubs which are smaller, localized hubs utilizing micro-mobility (like Metro Bike Share) to connect transit-dependent communities directly to the Games network.
