= Long Beach Boulevard =

Long Beach Boulevard may refer to:

- Long Beach Boulevard (California), a north–south thoroughfare in Los Angeles County
- Long Beach Boulevard (New Jersey), County Route 607 in Ocean County, New Jersey
