= Long Beach Boulevard (California) =

Street in Los Angeles

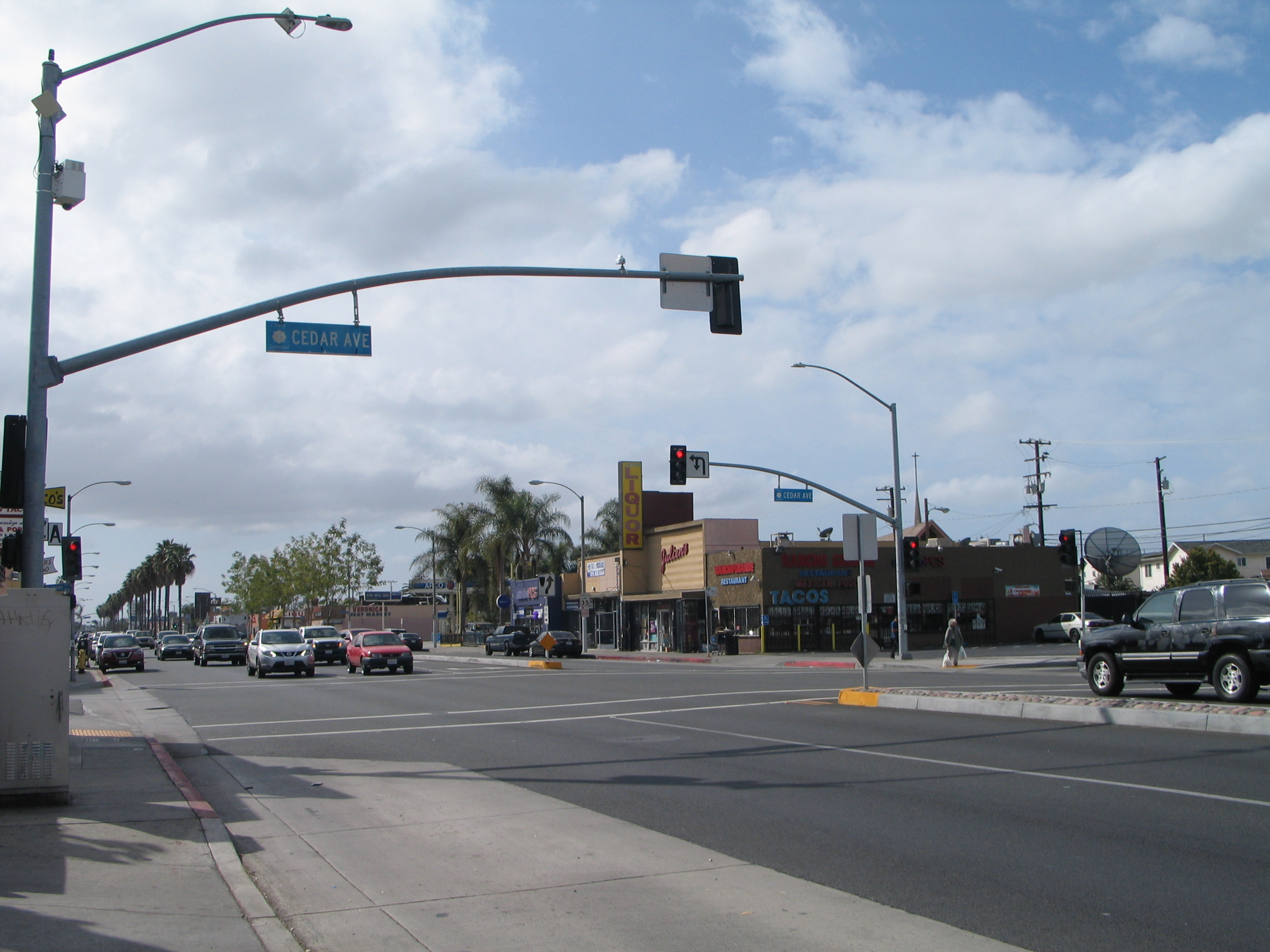
- Long Beach Boulevard in Lynwood
- Interactive map of Long Beach Boulevard
- Nearest metro station: Lynwood
- South end: Ocean Blvd. in Long Beach
- Major junctions: SR 1 in Long Beach I-405 in Long Beach; SR 91 in Compton; I-5 in Commerce; I-105 in Lynwood Firestone Blvd. in Walnut Park
- North end: Cudahy St. in Walnut Park

Long Beach Boulevard is a north–south thoroughfare in Los Angeles County.

== Geography ==
Long Beach Boulevard starts off as a continuation of Pacific Boulevard south of Cudahy Street in Walnut Park. Long Beach Boulevard passes through South Gate, Lynwood, Compton and Long Beach where it ends at Ocean Boulevard.

It crosses intersection with Firestone Boulevard (formerly State Route 42), Interstate 105 (Century Freeway), State Route 91 (Gardena Freeway), Interstate 710 (Long Beach Freeway), Interstate 405 (San Diego Freeway), and State Route 1 (Pacific Coast Highway).

== History ==
A segment of this street in Long Beach was originally named American Avenue, a name provided by local developer William Willmore. In 1958, Gerald Desmond and other members of the Long Beach City Council decided to begin the process of renaming this stretch of road to Long Beach Boulevard.

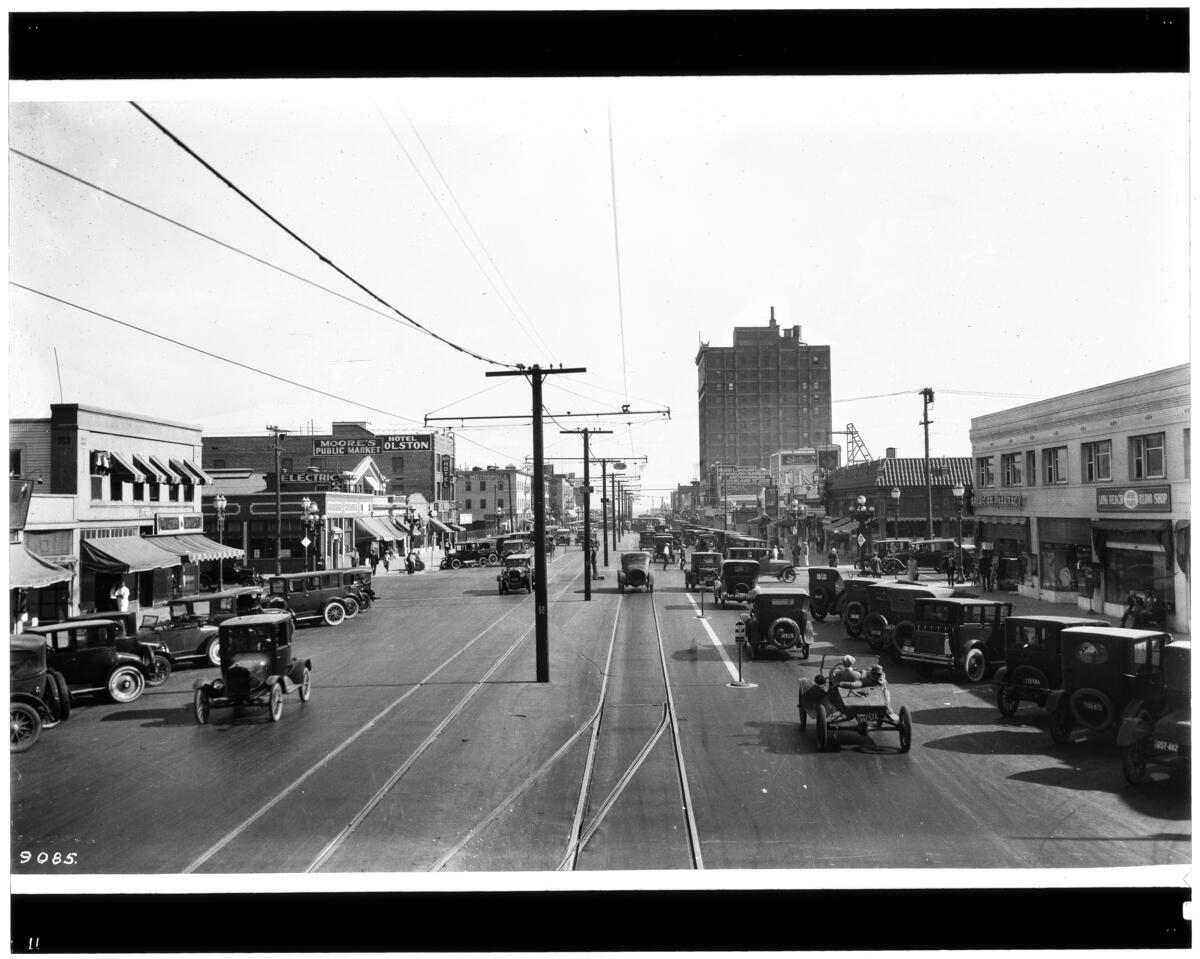
American Avenue in Long Beach, c. 1924

Model Cleaners, 25th & Long Beach Boulevard, Long Beach, 1977

In the 1970s, Long Beach Boulevard was lined with gay, lesbian, and transgender bars. Sailors from the local Long Beach Naval Shipyard and Naval Station would enjoy all the bar activity. Sailors had to be careful of military police "Witch Hunts," where Shore Patrol (SP) would venture into the bars and pull sailors from the bar and into paddy wagons.

== Public transportation ==
Bus service north of Artesia Boulevard is served by Metro Bus line 60. Service between Artesia Boulevard and the Long Beach Transit Mall is served by Long Beach Transit line 51. Metro line 60 replaces Long Beach line 51 during early mornings and late evenings.

=== Rapid transit ===
The Metro C Line serves a station at Interstate 105.

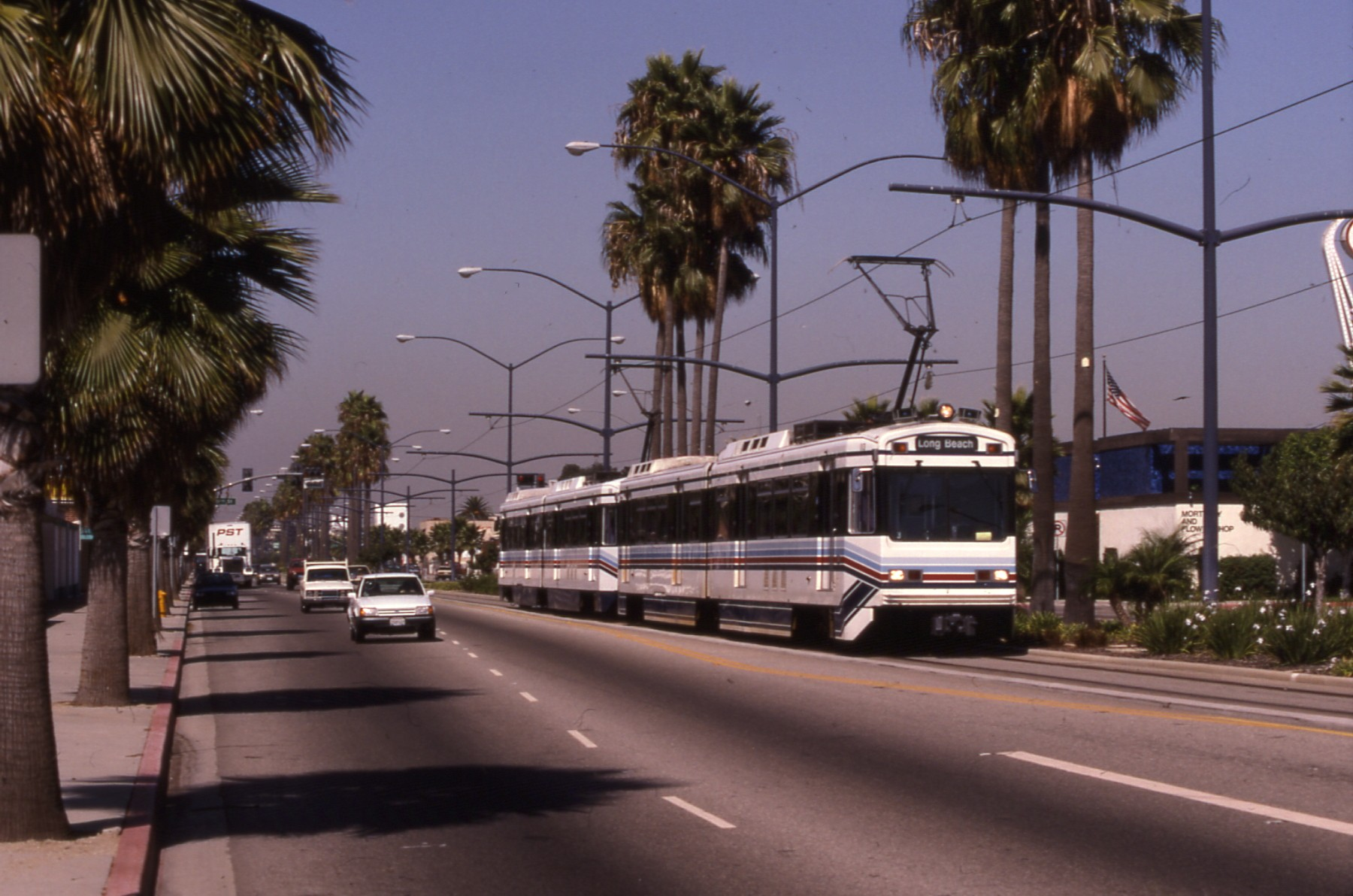
Metro Blue Line at Long Beach Blvd. and 20th St., 1995

The Metro A Line falls in the middle of the boulevard between Willow and 1st Streets in Long Beach, serving the: Willow Street, Pacific Coast Highway, Anaheim Street, 5th Street, and 1st Street stations.
