= Pacific Coast Highway station (A Line) =

Light rail station in Long Beach, California

Pacific Coast Hwy
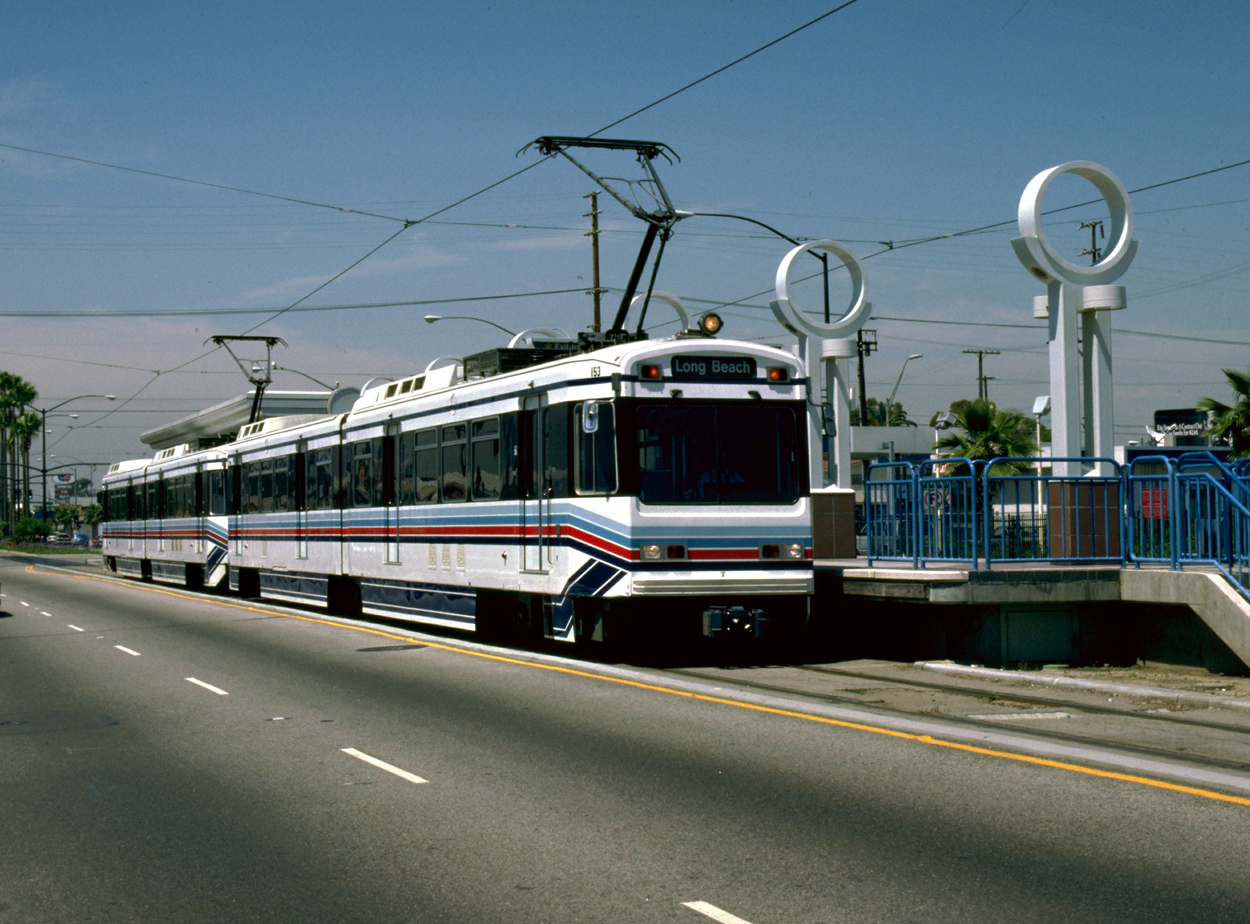
- Train at Pacific Coast Highway station in the 1990s

General information
- Location: 1798 North Long Beach Boulevard; Long Beach, California
- Coordinates: 33.7899°N 118.1895°W
- Owner: Los Angeles County Metropolitan Transportation Authority
- Platforms: 1 island platform
- Tracks: 2
- Connections: Long Beach Transit; Los Angeles Metro Bus

Construction
- Structure type: At-grade
- Cycle facilities: Racks
- Accessible: Yes

History
- Opened: July 14, 1990; 36 years ago
- Rebuilt: June 1, 2019

Passengers
- FY 2025: 1,676 (avg. wkdy boardings)

Services
Preceding station	Metro Rail	Following station
Anaheim Street toward Downtown Long Beach	A Line	Willow Street toward Pomona
Location

Pacific Coast Highway station is an at grade light rail station on the A Line of the Los Angeles Metro Rail system. The station is located in the median of Long Beach Boulevard at its intersection with Pacific Coast Highway, after which the station is named, in Long Beach, California.

North of this station, A Line trains enter an exclusive right-of-way (the historic route of the Pacific Electric Railway) which allows trains to reach higher speeds between stops.

A J Line station with an identical name is located approximately 5.4 miles (8.7 km) west of this station.

== Service ==
=== Hours and frequency ===
A Line service hours are from approximately 4:30 a.m. and 11:45 p.m. daily. Trains operate every 8 minutes during peak hours, Monday to Friday. Trains run every 10 minutes, during midday on weekdays and weekends, from 9:00 a.m. to 7:00 p.m. Night and early morning service is approximately every 20 minutes every day.

=== Connections ===
As of December 15, 2024, the following connections are available:

- Long Beach Transit: 51, 171, 172, 173, 174, 176
- Los Angeles Metro Bus: 60 (late night only)

== Artwork ==
Twelve Principles is a Metro Art commissioned sculptural artwork by Joe Lewis at Pacific Coast Highway Station. The project emphasizes shared values in a diverse world and is based on interviews conducted by the artist with over one hundred adults, children, students, and business people from various Long Beach communities. From these interviews, Lewis identified twelve principles deemed essential for a well-rounded person.

The artwork consists of twelve concrete, tile, and aluminum discs, each representing one of the principles.
