= SouthBay Pavilion =

Shopping mall in Carson, California, U.S.

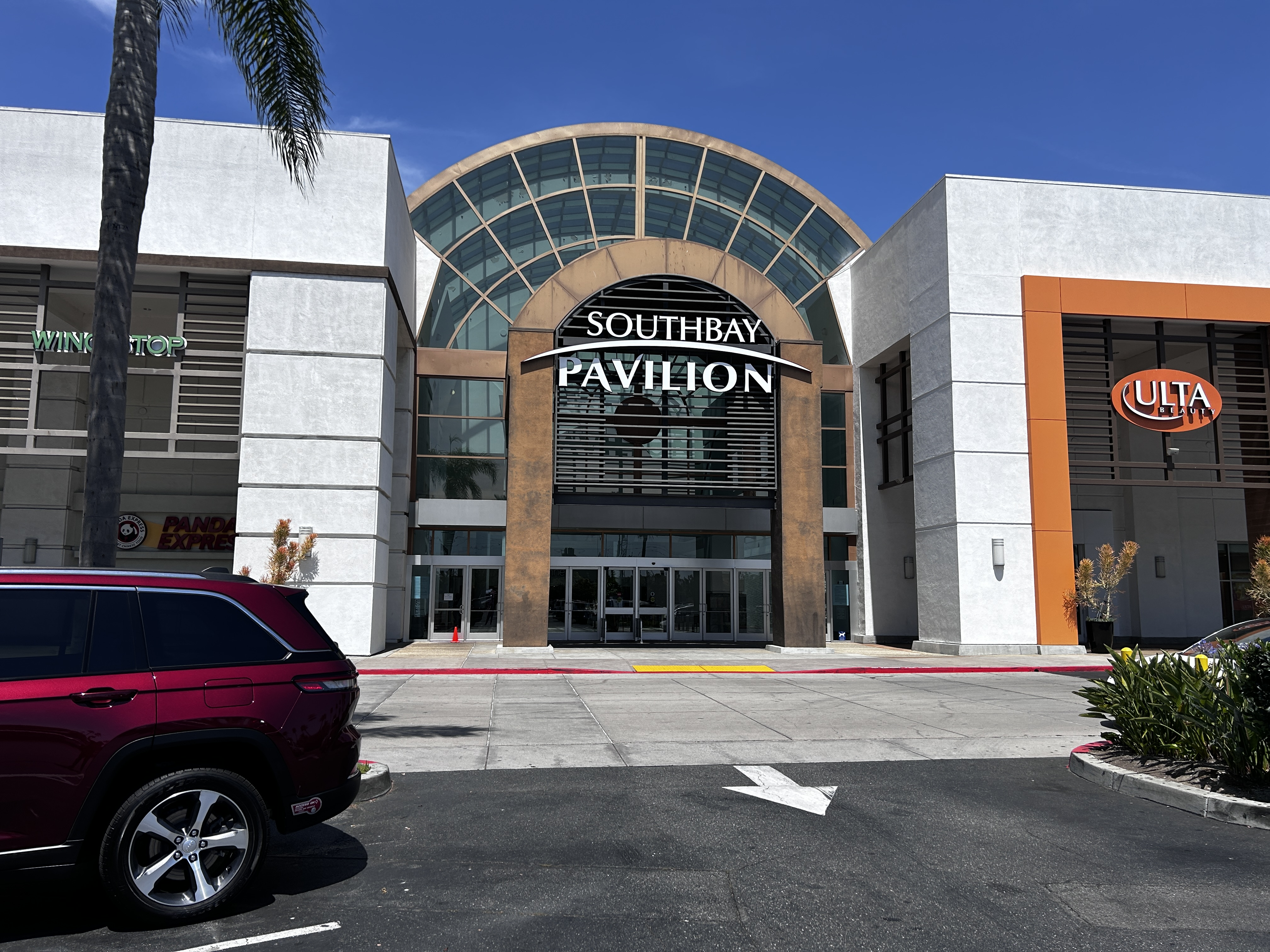
- Entrance in 2026
- Location: Carson, California, U.S.
- Coordinates: 33.84388°N 118.26109°W
- Address: 20700 Avalon Boulevard
- Opened: 1973
- Developer: Coldwell Banker
- Manager: Gerrity Group
- Owner: Gerrity Group
- Num. of stores: 20+
- Num. of anchor tenants: 5
- Floor area: 1,017,047 sq ft (94,486.8 m^{2})
- Floors: 1 (2 in JCPenney, 3 in IKEA)

SouthBay Pavilion, formerly Carson Mall, is a partially enclosed shopping mall in Carson, California. Opened in 1973, it features as its anchor retailers Burlington, IKEA, JCPenney, Ross Dress For Less, and Target. SouthBay Pavilion has been recognized by and award from the International Council of Shopping Centers (ICSC) for its innovative marketing and event programs focused on community service and social responsibility.

== History ==
The mall development was announced in 1972 with participation by JCPenney, Sears, The Broadway and J. J. Newberry dime stores. By 1985, Toys "R" Us was added. It was the first Toys "R" Us to be located in a shopping mall. The mall was sold to Macerich in 1987, and to MacDonald Group only five months later. Although it was renovated in the late 1980s and early 1990s, including the addition of public restrooms, Big 5 Sporting Goods, and a food court, it continued to have low traffic and vacancies.

The Broadway closed its store in 1991. That same year, Carson city council approved a financing package that would allow IKEA to move into the space being vacated by The Broadway. Also, the mall was renamed Southbay Pavilion.

Chuck E. Cheese's Pizza Time Theatre was added in 1983. Toys "R" Us closed its store in 2002. Circuit City was planning to open in the spot formerly occupied by Toys "R" Us in 2003, but it was cancelled. Target instead replaced Toys "R" Us.

In May 2003, the mall was sold to Hopkins Real Estate of Newport Beach. Renovation plans began on the mall, including demolition of the IKEA/Toys "R" Us wing for a Target store, which opened in 2005. 24 Hour Fitness also opened on an outparcel. Other additions included Old Navy and a relocation of Big 5. Vintage Real Estate purchased the mall in 2009.

In 2005, Chuck E. Cheese's made a remodel.

In May 2013, it was confirmed that Cinemark would be opening a movie theater within the mall. As a result, Old Navy was relocated. Chuck E. Cheese's would close on January 5, 2014 and moved over to the former Old Navy store on January 16, 2014 with a new look.

In May 2015, Cinemark Theatres opened its doors at SouthBay Pavilion. Following this, Kay Jewelers opened its doors in 2015 and Sephora (inside JCPenney) opened in May 2016.

In 2015, Sears Holdings spun off 235 of its properties, including the Sears at SouthBay Pavilion, into Seritage Growth Properties.

In June 2016, a press release was published by KTGY Architecture + Planning unveiling the further expansion for SouthBay Pavilion with Forever 21's F21RED which opened in early 2017.

On April 21, 2017, it was announced that Sears would be closing after originally announcing it would downsize it's store. The Sears closed on July 3, 2017 with portions of the building becoming Ross Dress for Less and Burlington, while the former auto center became Chipotle Mexican Grill, Smashburger, Jersey Mike's and Norms.

Payless Shoesource closed in early 2019.

In Summer 2019, Burlington and Ross Dress For Less opened up their locations in the former Sears space.

The mall was featured in Nathan for You, in a 2013 episode, when an unapproved Santa meet was arranged.

== Transit access ==
The Mall is accessible by LACMTA Metro Local Lines 205, 246, & Long Beach Transit Lines 1, 2.
