= Jim Isermann =

American artist

Jim Isermann (born 1955, Kenosha, Wisconsin) is an American artist. He is based in Palm Springs and Guerneville, California. In 1977 he graduated from University of Wisconsin-Milwaukee and then received an MFA from CalArts in 1980. His artwork has focused on post-war industrial design and architecture. He has participated in numerous exhibitions in art galleries and museum, and has also created large scale commissioned projects utilizing industrial manufacturing processes. His work has been presented in solo exhibitions at Richard Telles, Los Angeles (2017, 2014, 2009, 2000, 1998, 1994), Praz-Delavallade, Paris (2010), Corvi-Mora, London (2011), Mary Boone Gallery, New York (2011 & 2012) and others. Recent commissioned projects include works for the Hammer Museum in Los Angeles, CA, Yale University Art Museum in New Haven, CT, University of California, Riverside, Los Angeles Metro, and an installation for the Cowboys Stadium in Dallas, TX.

== Life and career ==
Isermann grew up in a 1922 Prairie Home in Wisconsin, and moved to Los Angeles, California to attend graduate school at Calarts. In 1997, with David Blomster, Isermann purchased a prefabricated steel and glass houses in Palm Springs that had been designed by Donald Wexler, and after refurbishing the building, eventually moved from Los Angeles to the property full time in 2000.

== Education and Teaching ==
In 1977 he graduated from University of Wisconsin-Milwaukee and then received an MFA from CalArts in 1980.

Isermann is a professor of Art at UC Riverside where he has taught since 2006, and has also taught at Occidental College, Otis College of Art and Design, and UCLA.

== Work and themes ==
=== Furniture Tableaus ===
In 1982 Jim Isermann created Motel Modern, an exhibition in a room at the Inn of Tomorrow, a hotel across the street from Disneyland. Isermann re-furnished the room with his own re-created 50's and 60's furniture and décor, including a giant chartreuse TV console. Much of the discussion around Isermann's work from this period focuses on the cyclical nature of style, taste, fashion, camp and kitsch. In 1987 the Isermann stated, "My art is about fine art becoming popular culture and then coming back around to fine art."

=== Crafts & the Construction of Pattern ===
Since the 90s Isermann's work has frequently been discussed as addressing issues of style and decoration at the intersection between art and applied design. Christopher Knight described "The domestic realm animates Isermann's art. He had spent the prior half-dozen years teaching himself a number of homespun craft techniques, gleaned from how-to handbooks. Stained glass panels, wall hangings of pieced fabric, woven textiles and hand-braided rugs are techniques that embrace a homey, lived-in, DIY aesthetic for objects, crossing art and design, functional and not."

In a revue of Isermann's 1994 retrospective of hand made objects including, a clock, a lamp, stained glass, shag rugs, and more Lisa Anne Auerbach writes, "Though these pieces border on craft, their high quality, size, and careful fabrication gives them an industrial air. Untitled, 1989, is an eight-foot-square wall-piece, half painting and half rug-hooking. The acrylic yarn matches the enamel paint, and the design flows almost seamlessly among the different surfaces..." Arbauch goes on to write of Isermann's Quilts from 1994, "A one hundred year old, lifetime quilter could not have made seams more perfect, and if stitches were brush strokes, Dutch still lifes wouldn't even come close to the precision of these works. "

=== Commercial Fabrication ===
By the new century Iserman began increasingly incorporating commercial fabrication into the production of his work. Beginning with vinyl decals of repeating patterns that were placed on the walls like wallpaper. These installations include an exhibition at the Portikus, Frankfurt, Germany in 2000, and the Hammer Museum, Los Angeles in 2002.

=== Paintings ===
Painting has been reoccurring mode of production for the artist since the beginning of his career. The paintings are hard edge geometric abstractions that artist produces himself with multiple layers of house paint applied by hand.

=== Queer Sensibilities ===
Isermann's work is frequently referred to as having a strong relationship queerness and camp. In 1998 Rhonda Lieberman wrote "It's as if the artist asked: 'How faggy could I make a minimalist object?' Notions of Camp are also frequently brought up in relation to Iserman's work.

Iserman has contributed two panels to the NAMES Project AIDS Memorial Quilt

=== Influences ===
Iserman's work is most commonly discussed in a lineage that engages in both abstraction, referencing Jean Arp, Anni Albers and Marimekko. The artist has also frequently mentioned how Sister Corita had a significant influence on him Andy Warhol had a significant impact on the artist and Iserman's vinyl wall coverings are often discussed in relation to Warhols wall paper.

== Selected Permanent Public Commissions ==
- “Petit Five”, 40 roto-molded polyethylene seating modules for the courtyard of Hagerty Hall at the Ohio State University. Columbus, Ohio. Installed 2012.
- “Untitled”, Vacuum formed wall commission. Cowboys Stadium, Arlington, Texas. Installed 2010.
- “Untitled (SEAS/ORFE),” 30 foot long, chrome plated aluminum and illuminated acrylic sculpture for the Fisher and Partners designed Sherrerd Hall, Princeton University. completed August 2008.
- UCR Genomics Building, modular metal and light wall sculpture, Riverside, CA. Commissioned 2005, projected completion 2009.
- LA Metro Customer Service Center at Wilshire and La Brea, Los Angeles, CA. Monumental architectural screen. Commissioned 2005, projected completion 2006.
- Five Pendant Chandelier and Carpet, Commission for The University of California, San Francisco, Mission Bay Campus
- Los Angeles County Transportation Commission, Metro A Line, 5th Street Station, Long Beach CA, completed 1995
- “T.V. Lounge,” American Museum of the Moving Image, Astoria NY

== Collections ==
- Albright-Knox Art Gallery, Buffalo, NY
- Art Institute of Chicago, Chicago, IL
- Le FRAC Poitou-Charentes, Poitier, France
- Fonds National d’Art Contemporain, France
- Los Angeles County Museum of Art, Los Angeles CA
- Laguna Art Museum, Laguna, CA.
- Museum of Contemporary Art, Chicago IL
- Museum of Contemporary Art, Los Angeles CA
- Museum of Contemporary Art, San Diego, CA
- Museum of Modern Art, New York NY
- Palm Springs Art Museum, Palm Springs, CA
- San Francisco Museum of Modern Art, San Francisco CA
- The Hammer Museum, Los Angeles, CA
- Van Abbemuseum, Eindhoven, Netherlands

== Awards ==
- 2001 -Guggenheim Fellowship
- 1999 -California Community Foundation, J.P. Getty Fellowship for the Visual Arts
- 1987 -National Endowment for the Arts, Visual Artist's Fellowship, Painting
- 1986 - Art Matters, Inc., New York, NY, Fellowship
- 1984 -National Endowment for the Arts, Visual Artist's Fellowship, Sculpture
