= Terry Braunstein (artist) =

American artist (born 1942)

- Born: Terry Malikin; 1942 (age 83–84); Washington, D.C.
- Education: University of Michigan; Maryland Institute College of Art
- Known for: Photomontage
- Spouse: David Braunstein
- Website: terrybraunstein.com

Terry Braunstein (née Malikin; born 1942) is a photomontage artist based in Long Beach, California. Her work has used multiple media – photography, installation, assemblage, painting, printmaking, video, sculpture and large permanent public art. She also creates artists' books (more than 90, between 1972 and 2016) – some published, most one-of-a-kind artists' books.

Braunstein's art references the style and form of artists Hannah Höch, Max Ernst, Joseph Cornell, László Moholy-Nagy, and Alexander Rodchenko.

In 2024, Braunstein donated most of her life's work to the University of Michigan Museum of Art (UMMA).

== Biography ==
Terry Braunstein was born Helen Terry Malikin in Washington, D.C. She received her BFA from the University of Michigan in 1964 and her MFA in painting and printmaking from the Maryland Institute College of Art, where she studied with Grace Hartigan. She spent her junior year of college in Aix-en-Provence at l’Ecole des Beaux Arts on a Carnegie Grant. After receiving her MFA, she taught at Prince George's Community College, where she created the Printmaking Department, and later at Northern Virginia Community College. In 1976 she began teaching at the Corcoran School of Art, where she ultimately became the head of the 3rd Year Fine Arts Program and was named Professor Emeritus in 1986. When she moved to California in 1986, she was invited to be a visiting artist at California State University, Long Beach.

== Recognition ==
In 1985, Braunstein was awarded a Visual Artist Fellowship by the National Endowment for the Arts. In 1999, and in 2012, she was awarded fellowships by the City of Long Beach. She was invited to Saratoga Springs, New York, for artist's residencies at Yaddo in 1997, 1999, 2003, and 2005. She was the recipient of the National Book Award of the Library Fellows of the National Museum of Women in the Arts for 1994. The resulting work, A Tale from the Fire, was published in April 1995. Terry Braunstein was the recipient of an Open Channels video grant from the Long Beach Museum of Art in 1992. In 2008, she was awarded an ARC Durfee Grant. In 2018, Braunstein was awarded a C.O.L.A. (City of Los Angeles) Individual Artists Fellowship.

== Public art ==
Terry Braunstein's first public art commission was for a Los Angeles Metro-Rail Blue Line station at Anaheim Street. During the following 10 years, she was awarded a commission to create a major memorial to the Navy presence in Long Beach; porcelain panels for the elevators of L.B. City Hall; a tile mosaic street improvement project in downtown Long Beach; and a 10 feet (3.0 m) high book, made of Byzantine mosaic, stainless steel and glass for the City of Cerritos. She was commissioned to create two photo-installations for the Los Angeles County Museum of Art's "Windows on Wilshire" series, curated by Howard Fox. In 2007 she completed mosaics and colored windows for the Sun Valley Health Center through the Los Angeles County Arts Commission, and projects for the L.B. Transit at six different bus stations, a North Long Beach Entryway mosaic for the Redevelopment Agency of Long Beach, and assisted Councilwoman Gerrie Schipske with art enhancements for Rosie the Riveter Park.

In 2013, Braunstein collaborated with choreographer Cyrus Parker-Jeannette and animator David Familian to create an installation-sculpture (10 feet (3.0 m) high bookwork) titled Who is She? for a dance performance that was part of an NEA-funded project, A-Lot, through the Arts Council of Long Beach to bring art to underserved communities.

== Collections ==
Braunstein's work is in the collections of the Getty Center for the Arts and Humanities, the National Museum of American Art, the Smithsonian American Art Museum, Los Angeles County Museum of Art, the Museum of Fine Arts Houston, the Walker Art Center, Bibliothèque Nationale in Paris, the Sackner Collection of Concrete Poetry, the Museum of Contemporary Art, Chicago, the Long Beach Museum of Art, and the Special Collections Library of the Museum of Modern Art in New York. Her photomontage book, Windows, was published in 1982 by the William Blake Press and the Visual Studies Workshop.

Today, her archive is housed at the University of Michigan Museum of Art (UMMA).

== Personal life ==
She is married to David Braunstein and has two children, Samantha (Braunstein) Stein and Matthew Braunstein.
