= Willow Street station =

Los Angeles Metro Rail station

Willow St
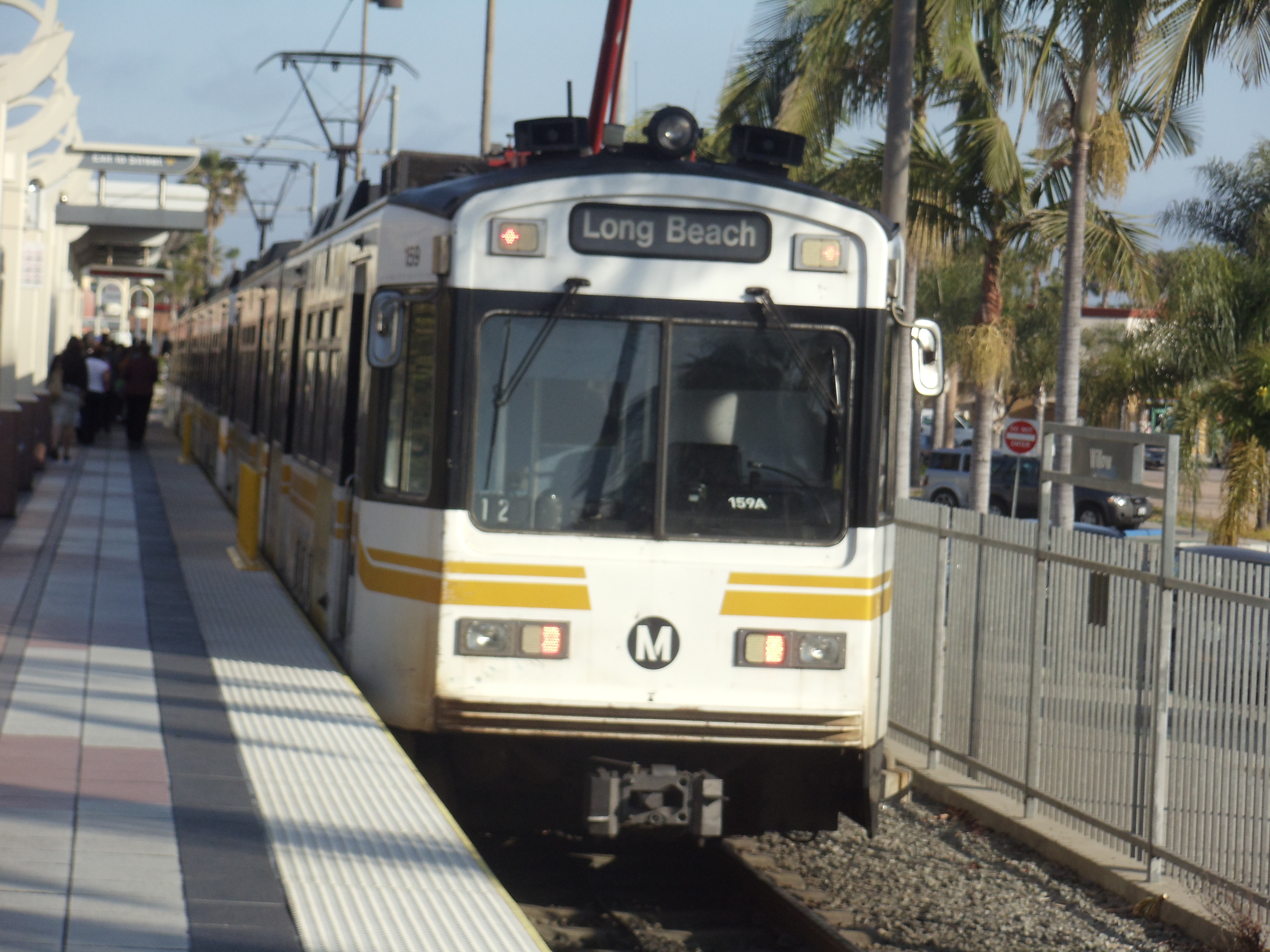
- Willow Street station platform

General information
- Location: 2750 American Avenue; Long Beach, California
- Coordinates: 33.807255°N 118.189999°W
- Owner: Los Angeles County Metropolitan Transportation Authority
- Platforms: 1 island platform
- Tracks: 2
- Connections: Long Beach Transit; Los Angeles Metro Bus

Construction
- Structure type: At-grade
- Parking: 1,068 spaces
- Cycle facilities: Racks and lockers
- Accessible: Yes

History
- Opened: July 14, 1990; 36 years ago
- Rebuilt: June 1, 2019

Passengers
- FY 2025: 1,810 (avg. wkdy boardings)

Services
Preceding station	Metro Rail	Following station
Pacific Coast Highway toward Downtown Long Beach	A Line	Wardlow toward Pomona
Former services
Preceding station	Pacific Electric	Following station
Morgan Avenue Terminus	Long Beach	Vista del Mar toward Pacific Electric Building
Burnett toward Balboa	Balboa	Vista del Mar toward Pacific Electric Building
Location

Willow Street station is an at-grade light rail station on the A Line of the Los Angeles Metro Rail system. The station is located adjacent to Long Beach Boulevard its intersection with Willow Street, after which the station is named, in the Wrigley neighborhood of Long Beach, California.

South of this station, A Line trains exit the exclusive right-of-way (the historic route of the Pacific Electric Railway) and start their street running portion in the median of Long Beach Boulevard.

Willow is a park and ride station with 920 parking spaces (including a multi-story parking facility) and 10 bike lockers. The Willow Street and Wardlow stations, both in Wrigley, are the two A Line stations closest to the Long Beach Municipal Airport.

== History ==
The station is on the site of a junction on the Pacific Electric Railway, where the Balboa Line split from the Long Beach Line. At various times, the junction was referred to as Willow, Willows, Willowville and North Long Beach.

== Service ==
=== Hours and frequency ===
A Line service hours are from approximately 4:30 a.m. and 11:45 p.m. daily. Trains operate every 8 minutes during peak hours, Monday to Friday. Trains run every 10 minutes, during midday on weekdays and weekends, from 9:00 a.m. to 7:00 p.m. Night and early morning service is approximately every 20 minutes every day.

=== Connections ===
As of December 15, 2024, the following connections are available:

- Long Beach Transit: 51, 101, 103, 104 (to Long Beach Airport), 405 (weekday express service to UCLA)
- Los Angeles Metro Bus: 60 (late night only)

== Station ==
Out of Sight is a site-specific artwork at Willow Station by Merge Conceptual Design, commissioned by Metro Art. The installation features a glass canopy and two concrete benches. The canopy’s angled translucent panels reveal different images based on perspective—a willow tree when viewed from the south and catenary wires from the north.

== Notable places nearby ==
- Wrigley Marketplace shopping center
- Long Beach Memorial Medical Center
- Pacific Hospital of Long Beach
- Veterans Park
- Sunnyside Cemetery & Long Beach Cemetery (these adjacent cemeteries on Willow St. date from before 1900).
