= Long Beach Transit =

Bus operator in California, US

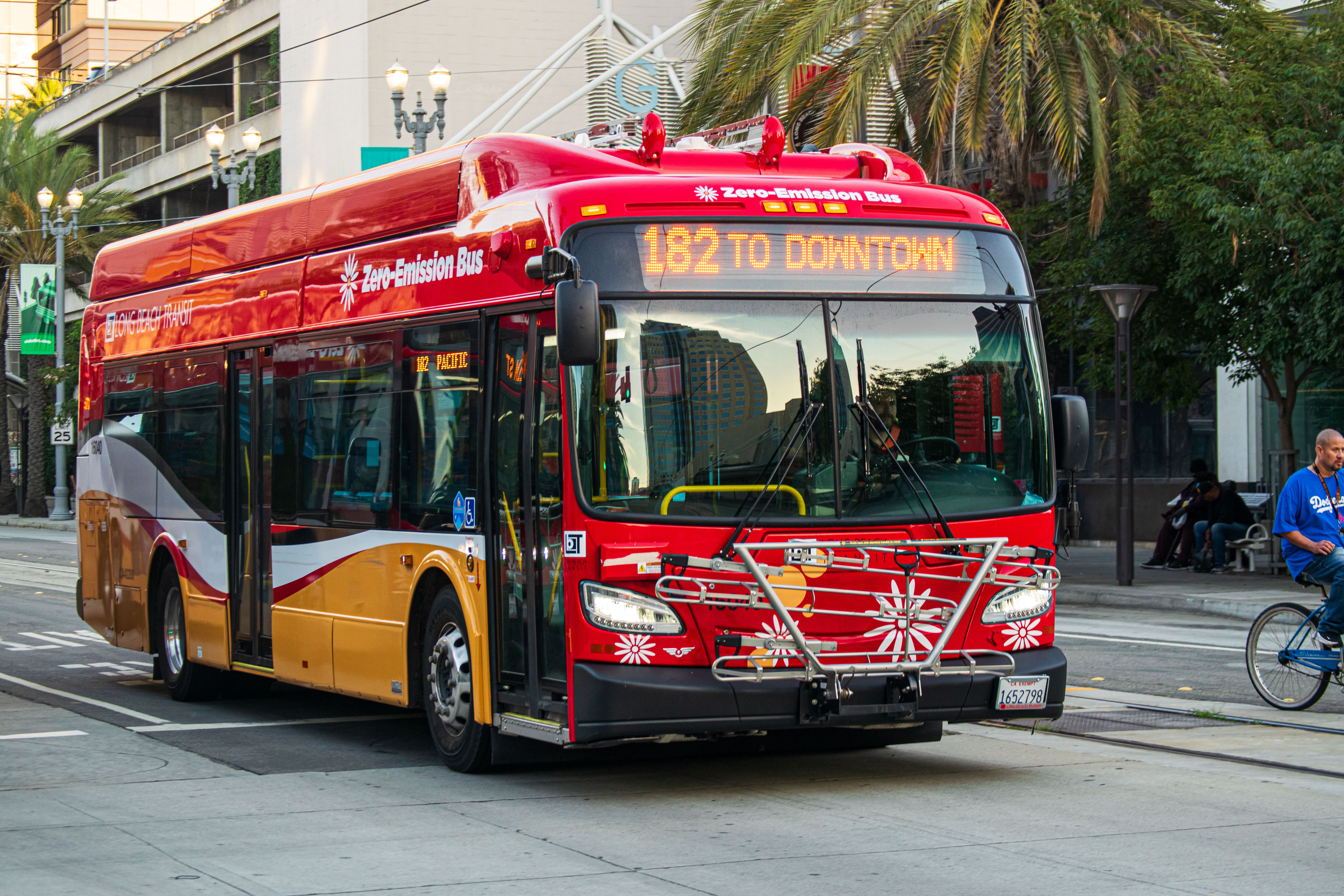
- Long Beach Transit bus in Downtown Long Beach
- Parent: Long Beach Public Transportation Company
- Founded: March 31, 1963; 63 years ago
- Headquarters: 1963 East Anaheim Street
- Locale: Long Beach, Paramount, Signal Hill, Carson and Lakewood, CA
- Service type: Bus service, Watertaxi
- Routes: 38 fixed routes
- Fleet: 220
- Daily ridership: 62,500 (weekdays, Q2 2026)
- Annual ridership: 19,737,300 (2025)
- Fuel type: Diesel, Gasoline-electric hybrid, CNG, battery electric
- Operator: Long Beach Public Transportation Company
- Website: ridelbt.com

Long Beach Transit (LBT) is the operator of public transit bus and ferry services in Long Beach, California and its surrounding cities. Long Beach Transit operates 37 bus routes, serving the Gateway Cities region of Los Angeles County. In addition to its bus services, LBT contracts with Catalina Express for the operation of two water taxi routes, and organizes the Dial-A-Lift paratransit service.

Long Beach Transit services are operated by the Long Beach Public Transportation Company, a nonprofit corporation controlled by the City of Long Beach. The system is funded in part by state tax revenue distributed by the Los Angeles County Metropolitan Transportation Authority. In 2025, the system had a ridership of 19,737,300, or about 62,500 per weekday as of the second quarter of 2026.

The central hub of the system is the Long Beach Transit Mall, located along 1st Street in downtown Long Beach. The Transit Mall is the southern terminus of the A Line light rail service, operated by Metro. Long Beach Transit services also connect to Torrance Transit, LADOT Commuter Express, Metro Bus, and OC Bus services. Other major destinations served by Long Beach Transit include Long Beach Airport, California State University Long Beach, CSU Dominguez Hills, and Los Cerritos Center.

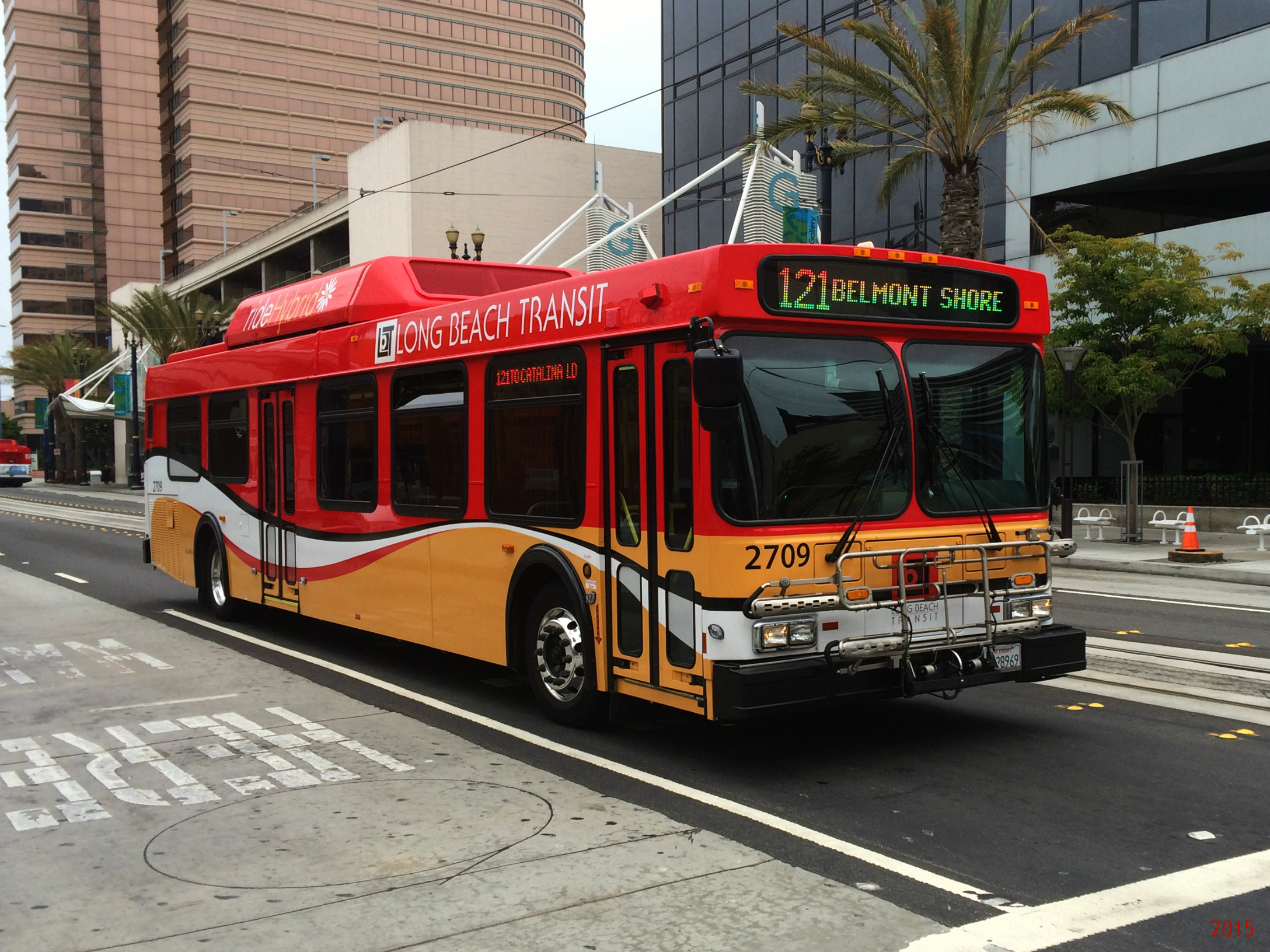
2007 New Flyer Low Floor (GE40LF)

== Services ==
Long Beach Transit operates its core local services in Long Beach, its enclave Signal Hill, and the nearby cities of Carson, Cerritos, Compton, Lakewood, Paramount, and Seal Beach. Commuter service operates on weekdays in the peak direction from Long Beach to UCLA, and limited special-event service is provided to Dignity Health Sports Park in Carson on LA Galaxy game days. The free Passport route serves Downtown Long Beach, connecting popular tourist destinations.

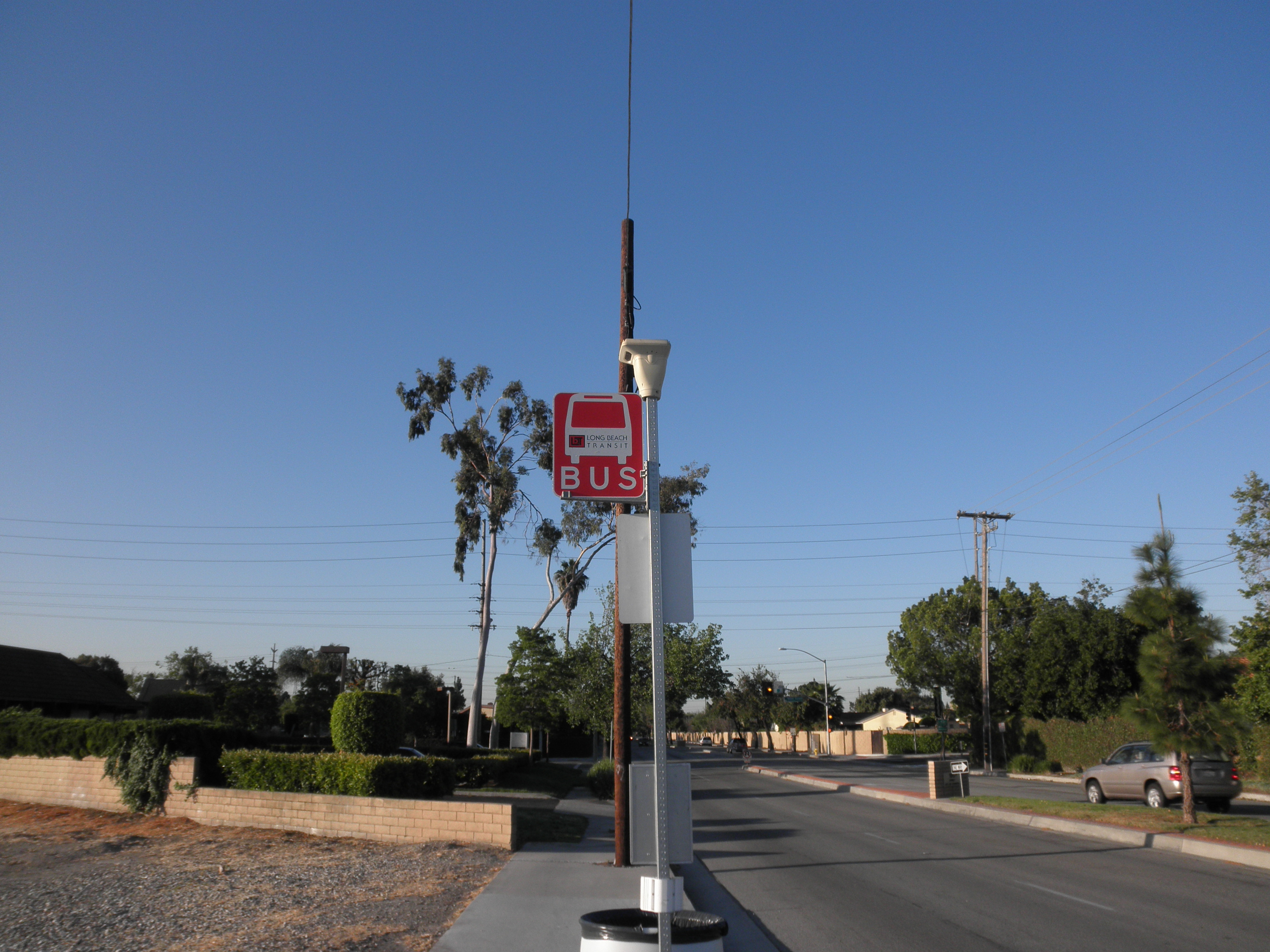
A LBT bus stop

=== Local bus services ===
Route	Terminals		Via	Notes
Passport	Long Beach; 10th St & Pine Av	Long Beach; RMS Queen Mary	Pine Av	Serves 5th Street station, 1st Street station, Long Beach Convention Center and Aquarium of the Pacific; Fare-free service
1	Carson; Cal State Dominguez Hills	Rancho Dominguez; Del Amo station	Avalon Bl, Del Amo Bl	Serves Dignity Health Sports Park and SouthBay Pavilion
2	Carson; Cal State Dominguez Hills	Carson; Figueroa St & Carriagedale Dr	Central Av, Avalon Bl	Serves Dignity Health Sports Park and SouthBay Pavilion
4	Carson; Carson St & Vermont Av	Rancho Dominguez; Del Amo station	Carson Street	
8	Carson; 223rd St & Vermont Av	Long Beach; Wardlow station	223rd Street	
21	Long Beach; Downtown Long Beach station	Paramount; Garfield Av & Petrol St	Cherry Av	
22	Long Beach; Downtown Long Beach station	Downey; Lakewood Boulevard station	Cherry Av, Downey Av	
41	Long Beach; Cal State Long Beach	Long Beach; Wardlow station	Easy Av, Anaheim St	Serves Anaheim Street station
45	Long Beach; Cal State Long Beach	Long Beach; Anaheim St & Santa Fe Av	Anaheim St	Route 45 will only operate as resources allow during school commute times; Serves Anaheim Street station
46	Long Beach; Cal State Long Beach	Long Beach; Downtown Long Beach station	Anaheim St	Serves Anaheim Street station, 5th Street station and 1st Street station
51	Long Beach; Downtown Long Beach station	Compton; Artesia station	Long Beach Bl	Serves 1st Street station, 5th Street station, Anaheim Street station, Pacific Coast Highway station, Willow Street station and Compton College
61	Long Beach; Downtown Long Beach station	Compton; Artesia station	Atlantic Av	Serves Compton College
71	Long Beach; Downtown Long Beach station	Downey; Lakewood Bl & Century Bl	Alamitos Av, Orange Av	Serves Long Beach City College
91	Long Beach; Downtown Long Beach station	Long Beach; Alondra Bl & Woodruff Av	7th St, Bellflower Bl	Serves 1st Street station, 5th Street station and Cal State Long Beach
92	Long Beach; Downtown Long Beach station	Bellflower; Woodruff Av & Alondra Bl	7th St, Woodruff Av	Serves 1st Street station, 5th Street station and Cal State Long Beach
93	Long Beach; Downtown Long Beach station	Bellflower; Alondra Bl & Woodruff Av	7th St, Clark Av	Serves 1st Street station, 5th Street station, Cal State Long Beach and Lakewood Center
94	Long Beach; Downtown Long Beach station	Bellflower; Bellflower Bl & Stearns St	7th St	Serves 1st Street station, 5th Street station and Cal State Long Beach
101	Long Beach; Santa Fe Av & 25th St	Hawaiian Gardens; Carson St & Norwalk Bl	Willow St, Carson St	Serves Long Beach City College
103	Long Beach; Santa Fe Av & 25th St	Lakewood; Lakewood Center	Willow St, Carson St	Serves Long Beach City College
104	Long Beach; Santa Fe Av & 25th St	Hawaiian Gardens; Carson St & Norwalk Bl	Willow St, Spring St	Serves Long Beach Airport
111	Long Beach; Downtown Long Beach station	Lakewood; South St & Downey Av	Broadway, Lakewood Bl	Serves 1st Street station, Long Beach Airport and Lakewood Center
112	Long Beach; Downtown Long Beach station	Lakewood; South St & Downey Av	Broadway, Clark Av	Serves 1st Street station, Long Beach City College and Lakewood Center
121	Long Beach; PCH & Clark Av	Long Beach; Catalina Landing	Ocean Bl	Serves Cal State Long Beach, 1st Street station and Downtown Long Beach station
131	Long Beach; Wardlow station	Long Beach; Alamitos Bay	Redondo Av	
141	Compton; Artesia station	Cerritos; Los Cerritos Center	Artesia Bl	Serves Compton College
151	Long Beach; Cesar E. Chavez Park	Long Beach; 4th St & Ximeno Av	4th St	Serves Downtown Long Beach station
171	Long Beach; Villages at Cabrillo	Seal Beach; Electric Av & Main Av	Pacific Coast Hwy	Serves Pacific Coast Highway station, Long Beach City College and Cal State Long Beach
172	Long Beach; Downtown Long Beach station	Norwalk; Norwalk station	Pacific Coast Hwy, Palo Verde Av	Serves 1st Street station, 5th Street station, Pacific Coast Highway station and Long Beach City College
172	Long Beach; Downtown Long Beach station	Cerritos; Los Cerritos Center (weekdays)	Pacific Coast Hwy, Palo Verde Av	Serves 1st Street station, 5th Street station, Pacific Coast Highway station and Long Beach City College
173	Long Beach; Downtown Long Beach station	Norwalk; Norwalk station	Pacific Coast Hwy, Studebaker Rd	Serves 1st Street station, 5th Street station, Pacific Coast Highway station, Long Beach City College, Cal State Long Beach, Los Cerritos Center and Cerritos College
174	Long Beach; Downtown Long Beach station	Long Beach; PCH & Ximeno Av	Pacific Coast Hwy	Serves 1st Street station, 5th Street station, Pacific Coast Highway station and Long Beach City College
175	Long Beach; Villages at Cabrillo	Long Beach; Cal State Long Beach	Pacific Coast Hwy	Serves Pacific Coast Highway station and Long Beach City College
181	Long Beach; Downtown Long Beach station	Long Beach; Wardlow station	Magnolia Av	
182	Long Beach; Downtown Long Beach station	Long Beach; Wardlow station	Pacific Av	Serves Pacific Avenue station
191	Long Beach; Downtown Long Beach station	Lakewood; Bloomfield Av & Del Amo Bl	Santa Fe Av, Del Amo Bl	Serves Del Amo station and Lakewood Center
192	Long Beach; Downtown Long Beach station	Cerritos; Los Cerritos Center	Santa Fe Av, South St	Serves Del Amo station

=== Commuter service ===
Route	Terminals		Via	Notes
405	Long Beach; Long Beach Airport	Westwood; UCLA	I-405	Branded UCLA/Westwood Commuter Express; Serves Willow Street station

=== Special event service ===
Route	Terminals		Via	Notes
Galaxy Express	Gardena; Harbor Gateway Transit Center	Carson; Dignity Health Sports Park	Victoria St	Operates for LA Galaxy games; Fare-free service
Galaxy Express	Rancho Dominguez; Del Amo station	Carson; Dignity Health Sports Park	Del Amo Bl	Operates for LA Galaxy games; Fare-free service

=== Water taxis ===
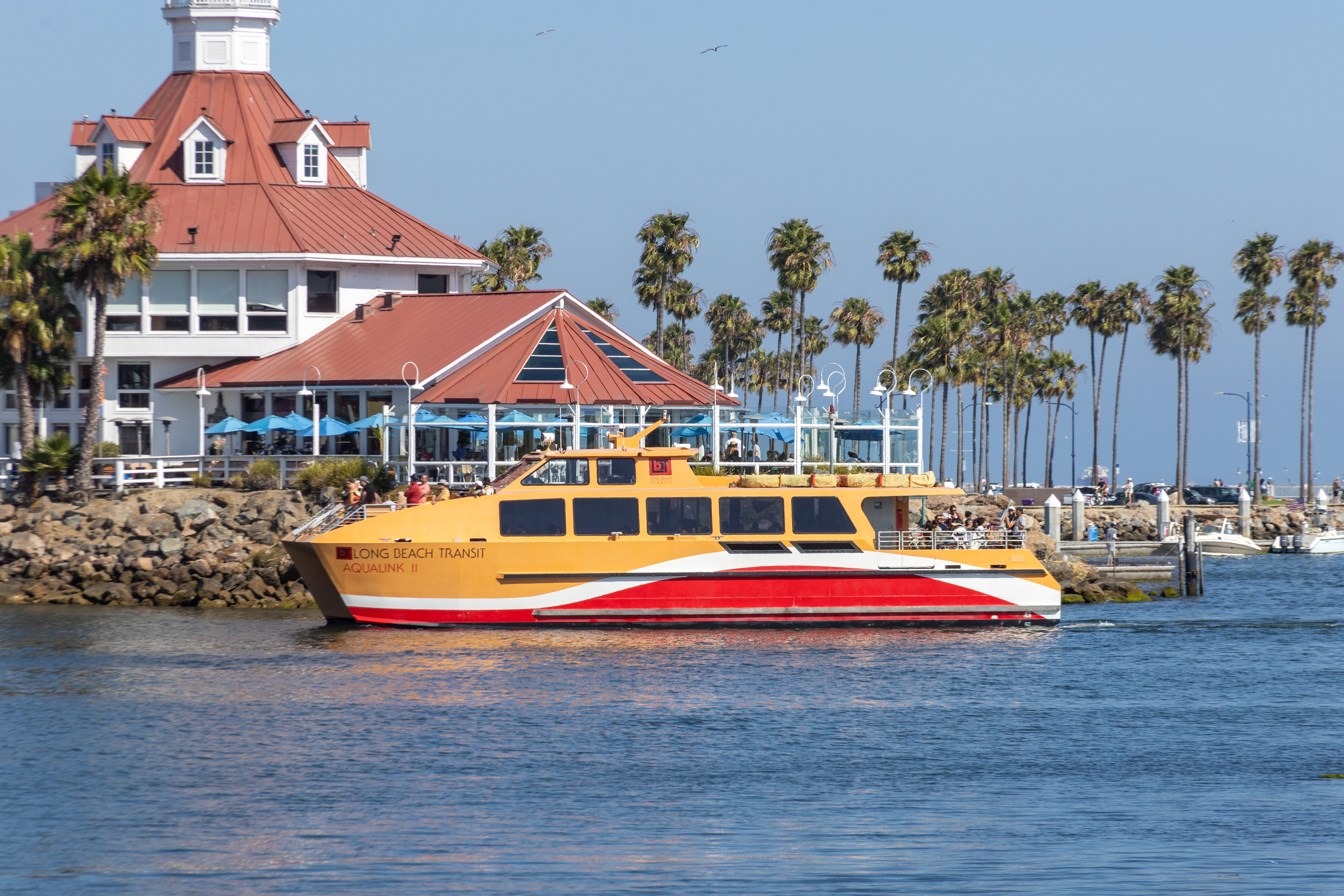
AquaLink approaching Alamitos Bay Landing

Long Beach Transit operates two year-round water taxi services: the 49-passenger AquaBus, and the 75-passenger AquaLink, which connect the major attractions of Downtown Long Beach, including the Aquarium of the Pacific, Long Beach Cruise Terminal, and the RMS Queen Mary hotel. In 2025, the two water routes had a ridership of 65,700, or about 300 per weekday as of the second quarter of 2026.

Route	Terminals		Via	Notes
AquaBus	Long Beach; Aquarium of the Pacific	Long Beach; Queen Mary	Queensway Bay	The 49-passenger AquaBus has six "ports of call": the Aquarium of the Pacific, Queen Mary, Shoreline Village, Catalina Landing, Pine Avenue Circle, and Hotel Maya.; The fare is $1 one-way
AquaLink	Long Beach; Aquarium of the Pacific	Long Beach; Alamitos Bay Landing	Queensway Bay	The AquaLink is a 68-foot catamaran that ferries up to 75 passengers to attractions in Long Beach Harbor and on to Alamitos Bay Landing.; The fare is $5 one-way.

== Fares ==
Long Beach Transit accepts cash, TAP cards, and credit/debit cards for fare payment on buses. Discounted fares are available to seniors, individuals with disabilities, and CSU Long Beach students. Long Beach Unified School District, Long Beach City College students and students across the county ride LBT buses for free with a GoPass TAP card. As of 2026, the standard bus fare is $1.25.

Fare collection was suspended at the start of the COVID-19 pandemic, resuming in September 2021.

== Bus fleet ==
As of 2025, Long Beach Transit operates 250 buses: 44 battery-electric buses, 81 hybrid buses, and 125 using compressed natural gas. Since 2020, the agency has only purchased zero-emissions buses. Long Beach Transit buses are operated out of two yards: the Anaheim Street Facility in Eastside Long Beach and the Jackson Transit Center in North Long Beach.
