= Anaheim Street station =

Los Angeles Metro Rail station

Anaheim St
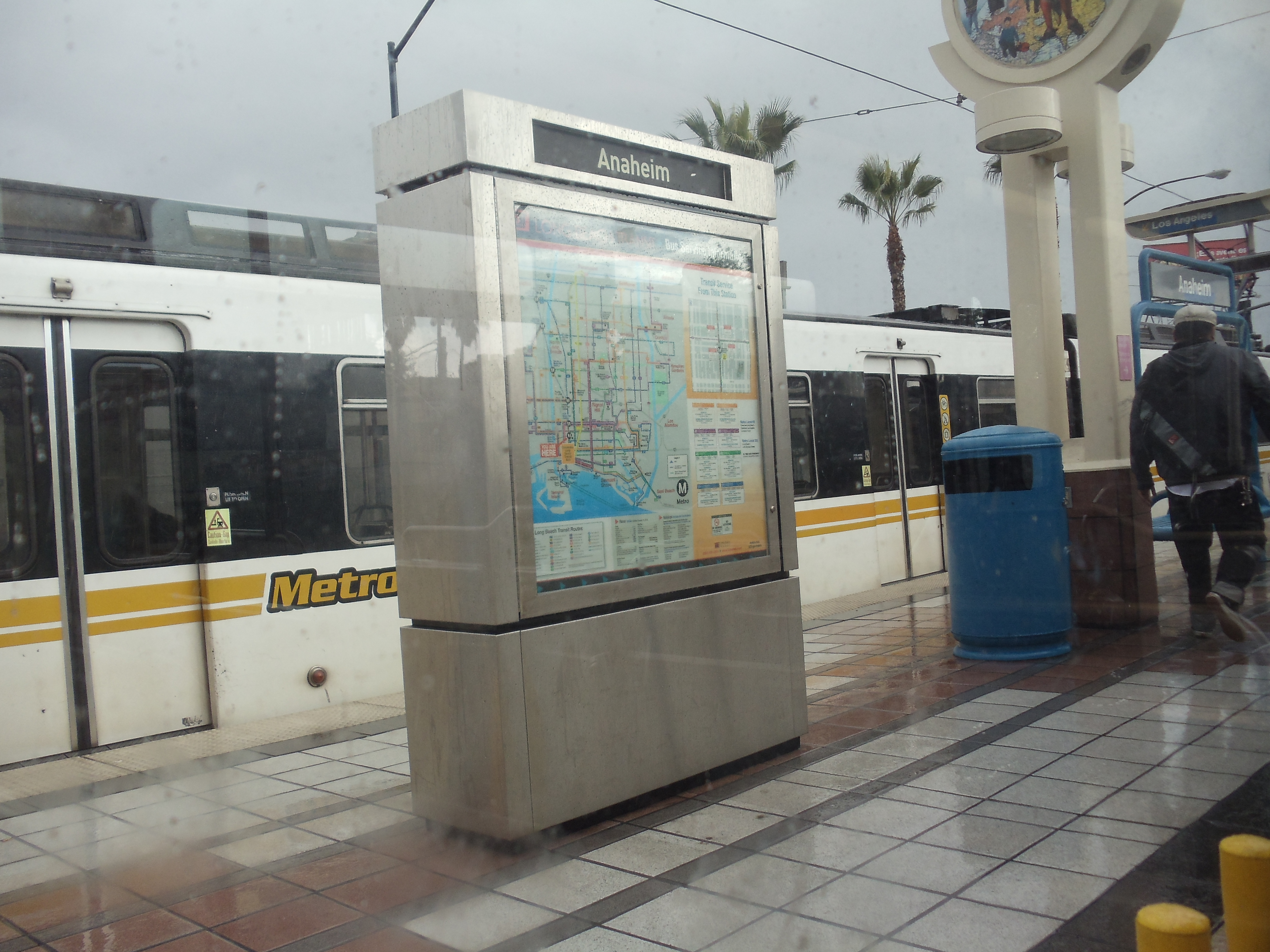
- Anaheim Street station platform

General information
- Location: 1290 North Long Beach Boulevard; Long Beach, California
- Coordinates: 33.7826°N 118.1895°W
- Owner: Los Angeles County Metropolitan Transportation Authority
- Platforms: 1 island platform
- Tracks: 2
- Connections: Long Beach Transit; Los Angeles Metro Bus

Construction
- Structure type: At-grade
- Cycle facilities: Long Beach Bike Share station and racks
- Accessible: Yes

History
- Opened: July 14, 1990; 36 years ago
- Rebuilt: June 1, 2019
- Former names: Anaheim

Passengers
- FY 2025: 1,810 (avg. wkdy boardings)

Services
| Preceding station | Metro Rail | Following station |
|---|---|---|
| Pacific Avenue One-way operation | A Line | Pacific Coast Highway toward Pomona |
| 5th Street toward Downtown Long Beach | A Line | Pacific Coast Highway toward Pomona |
Location

Anaheim Street station is an at-grade light rail station on the A Line of the Los Angeles Metro Rail system. The station is located in the median of Long Beach Boulevard at its intersection with Anaheim Street, after which the station is named, in Long Beach, California.

This station is not named after the city of Anaheim, which is about 10 miles (16 km) away; it is named after the street near which it is located.

== History ==
When the line opened on July 14, 1990, as the Blue Line, this station was the southern terminus until the Downtown Long Beach Loop opened on September 1, 1990. To facilitate the loop, which runs in a clockwise direction, the two main tracks cross each other at an "X" within the median at 9th Street south of this station. The southbound track then continues in the median by itself beyond 8th Street, passes two stations, then curves west onto the 1st Street Transit Mall, where it has a brief 2-track segment through the Downtown Long Beach station (which is designated as the terminal point of the line). From there, the tracks continue as northbound, first turning north into the median of Pacific Avenue (where they rejoin as a single track). After passing one more station, the track then curves east onto 8th Street before turning back north onto Long Beach Boulevard.

== Service ==
=== Hours and frequency ===
A Line service hours are from approximately 4:30 a.m. and 11:45 p.m. daily. Trains operate every 8 minutes during peak hours, Monday to Friday. Trains run every 10 minutes, during midday on weekdays and weekends, from 9:00 a.m. to 7:00 p.m. Night and early morning service is approximately every 20 minutes every day.

=== Connections ===
As of December 15, 2024, the following connections are available:

- Long Beach Transit: 41, 45, 46, 51, 52
- Los Angeles Metro Bus: 60 (late night only), 232

== Station ==
Local Odysseys is a photo-montage project by Metro Art commissioned artist Terry Braunstein, installed at Anaheim Street Station. The artwork consists of fourteen photo-montages fabricated into porcelain enamel panels. The project features contemporary photographs of “local heroes” from the station area—individuals who have contributed to the community through service, often without wide recognition, such as volunteers in community service organizations.

== Notable places nearby ==
- St. Mary Medical Center
