= 5th Street station (Los Angeles Metro) =

Light rail station in Long Beach, California

5th St
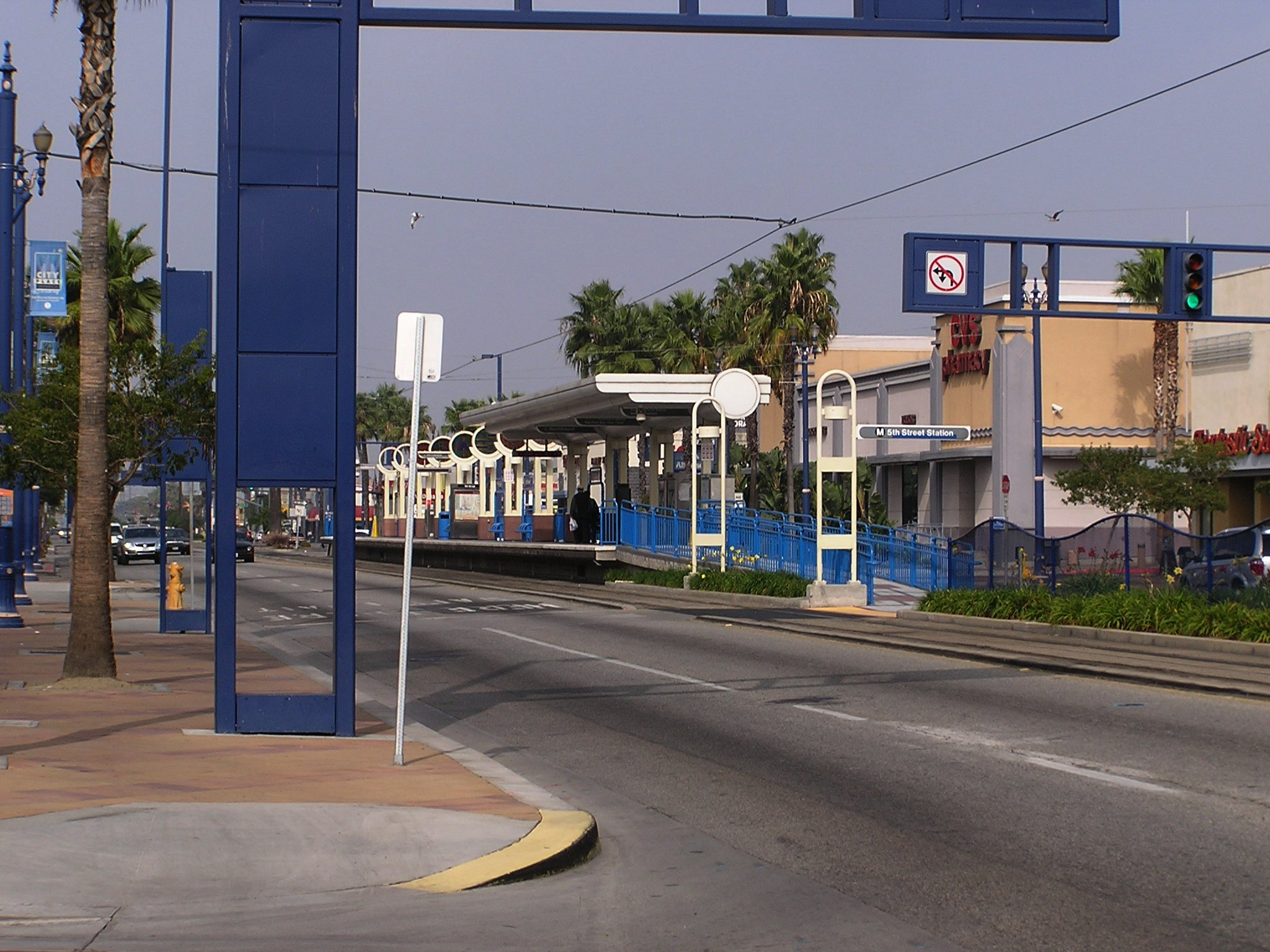
- 5th Street station platform

General information
- Location: 598 North Long Beach Boulevard; Long Beach, California
- Coordinates: 33.7742°N 118.1894°W
- Owner: Los Angeles County Metropolitan Transportation Authority
- Platforms: 1 side platform
- Tracks: 1
- Connections: Long Beach Transit; Los Angeles Metro Bus

Construction
- Structure type: At-grade
- Cycle facilities: Long Beach Bike Share station and racks
- Accessible: Yes

History
- Opened: September 1, 1990; 36 years ago
- Rebuilt: October 20, 2014; June 1, 2019

Passengers
- FY 2026: 332 (avg. wkdy boardings)

Services
Preceding station	Metro Rail	Following station
1st Street toward Downtown Long Beach	A Line	Anaheim Street One-way operation
Location

5th Street station is an at-grade light rail station on the A Line of the Los Angeles Metro Rail system. The station is located in the median of Long Beach Boulevard at its intersection with 5th Street, after which the station is named, in Long Beach, California. The station is on a loop at the south end of the A Line route and only has southbound service.

== Service ==
=== Hours and frequency ===
A Line service hours are from approximately 4:30 a.m. and 11:45 p.m. daily. Trains operate every 8 minutes during peak hours, Monday to Friday. Trains run every 10 minutes, during midday on weekdays and weekends, from 9:00 a.m. to 7:00 p.m. Night and early morning service is approximately every 20 minutes every day.

=== Connections ===
As of February 20, 2022, the following connections are available:

- Long Beach Transit: 46, 51, 91, 92, 93, 94, 96 ZAP
- Los Angeles Metro Bus: 60 (late night only), 232

== Station ==
Failed Ideals is a stained-glass artwork by Metro Art commissioned artist Jim Isermann, consisting of six stained-glass windows installed into the portholes of the station pylons at Fifth Street Station. Each window design is inspired by architectural details from the City of Long Beach, some of which have been lost while others endure. These details range from 1950s concrete block and linoleum patterns to 1960s remodeled facades of older buildings. The architectural references in Failed Ideals evoke the lost optimism and failed aspirations of their respective eras.
