= Pacific Avenue station =

Light rail station in Long Beach, California

Pacific Av
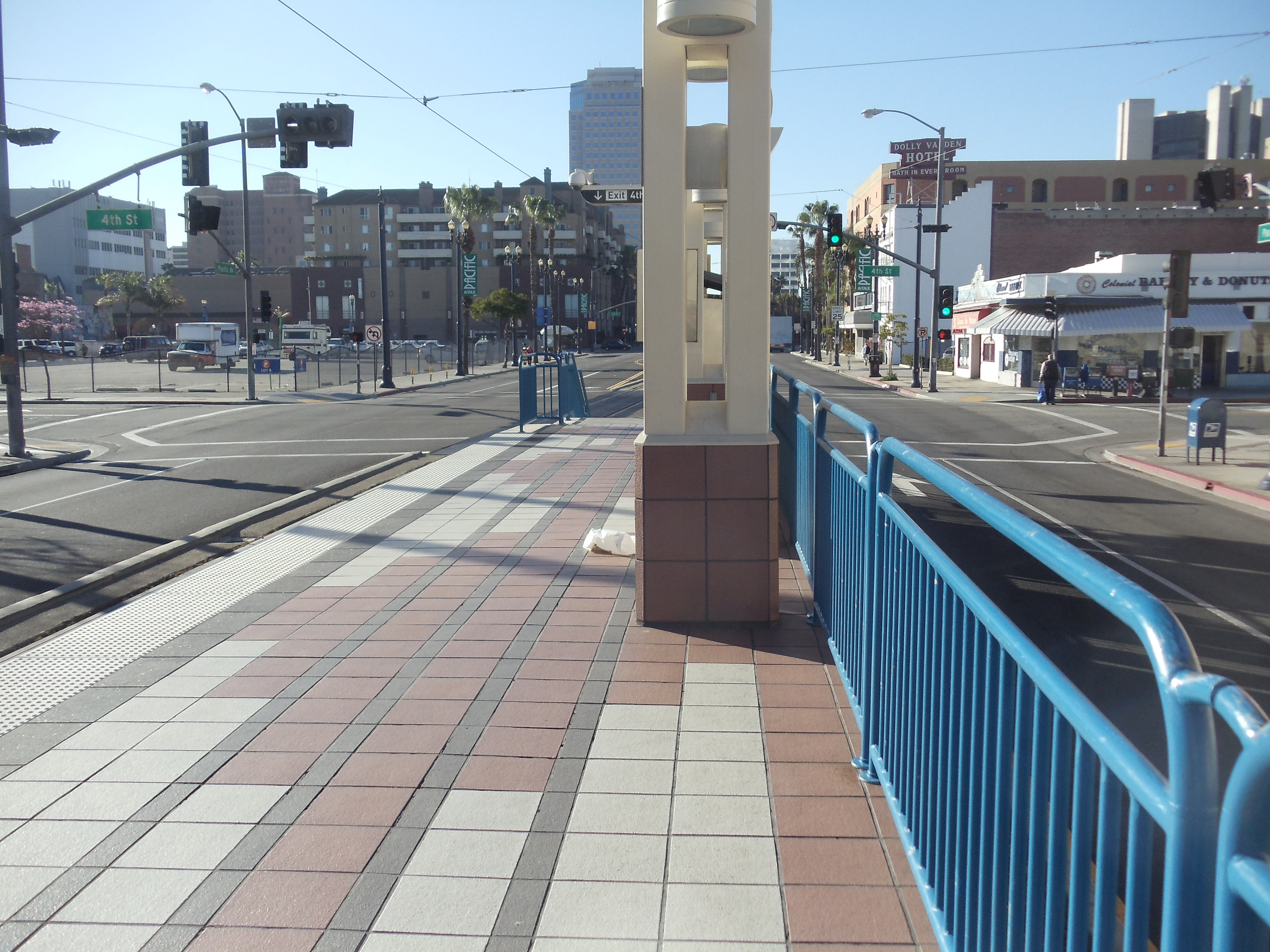
- Pacific Avenue station platform

General information
- Location: 498 Pacific Avenue; Long Beach, California
- Coordinates: 33.7729°N 118.1939°W
- Owner: Los Angeles County Metropolitan Transportation Authority
- Platforms: 1 side platform
- Tracks: 1
- Connections: Long Beach Transit; Torrance Transit

Construction
- Structure type: At-grade
- Parking: Paid parking nearby
- Cycle facilities: Long Beach Bike Share station and racks
- Accessible: Yes

History
- Opened: September 1, 1990; 35 years ago
- Rebuilt: October 20, 2014; June 1, 2019

Passengers
- FY 2025: 756 (avg. wkdy boardings)

Services
Preceding station	Metro Rail	Following station
Anaheim Street toward Pomona	A Line	Downtown Long Beach One-way operation
Location

Pacific Avenue station is an at-grade light rail station on the A Line of the Los Angeles Metro Rail system. The station is located in the median of Pacific Avenue, after which the station is named, between West 4th Street and West 5th Street, in the city of Long Beach, California. The station is located on a loop at the south end of the A Line route and only has northbound service.

== Service ==
=== Hours and frequency ===
A Line service hours are from approximately 4:30 a.m. and 11:45 p.m. daily. Trains operate every 8 minutes during peak hours, Monday to Friday. Trains run every 10 minutes, during midday on weekdays and weekends, from 9:00 a.m. to 7:00 p.m. Night and early morning service is approximately every 20 minutes every day.

=== Connections ===
As of February 20, 2022, the following connections are available:

- Long Beach Transit: 51, 81, 91, 92, 93, 94, 172, 173, 174, 182 (151, 181, 191, 192 on nearby 3rd Street)
- Torrance Transit: 3, Rapid 3
