= 1st Street station (Los Angeles Metro) =

Light rail station in Long Beach, California

1st St
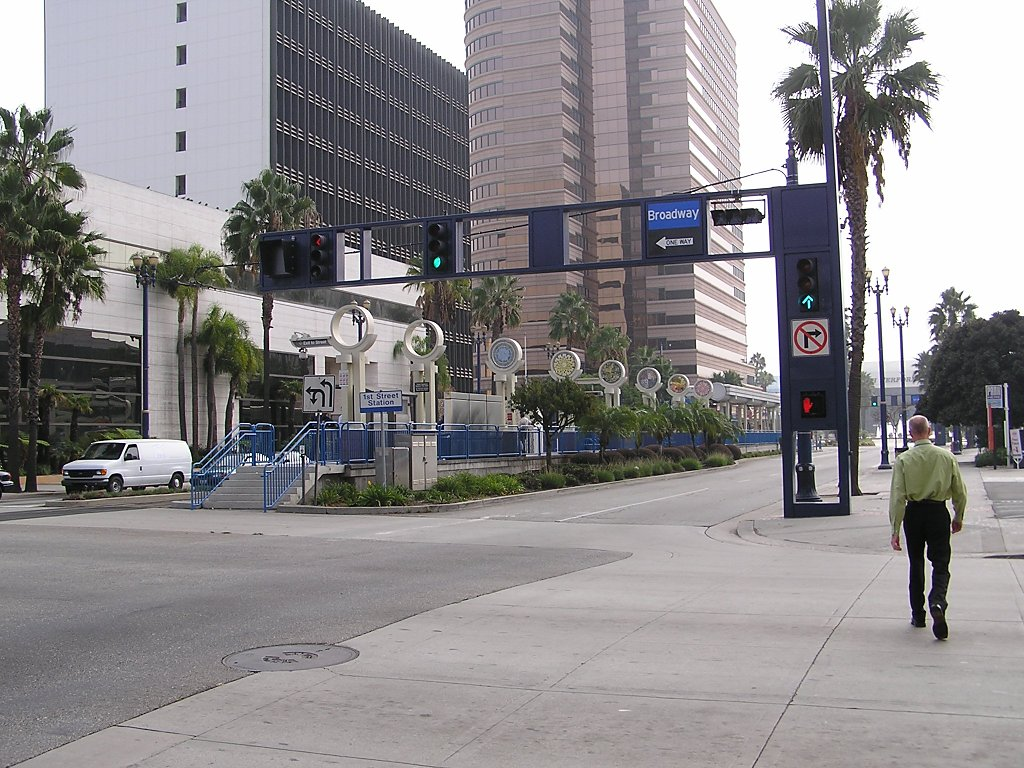
- 1st Street station platform

General information
- Location: 108 North Long Beach Boulevard; Long Beach, California
- Coordinates: 33.7683°N 118.1895°W
- Owner: Los Angeles County Metropolitan Transportation Authority
- Platforms: 1 side platform
- Tracks: 1
- Connections: Long Beach Transit; Los Angeles Metro Bus

Construction
- Structure type: At-grade
- Parking: Paid parking nearby
- Cycle facilities: Long Beach Bike Share station and racks
- Accessible: Yes

History
- Opened: September 1, 1990; 35 years ago
- Rebuilt: October 20, 2014; June 1, 2019

Passengers
- FY 2025: 297 (avg. wkdy boardings)

Services
Preceding station	Metro Rail	Following station
Downtown Long Beach Terminus	A Line	5th Street One-way operation
Location

1st Street station is an at-grade light rail station on the A Line of the Los Angeles Metro Rail system. The station is located in the median of Long Beach Boulevard at its intersection with 1st Street, after which the station is named, in Long Beach, California. The station is on a loop at the south end of the A Line route and only has southbound service.

During the 2028 Summer Olympics, the station will serve spectators traveling to and from venues located at the Long Beach Sports Park including handball at the Long Beach Arena, temporary facilities for Beach Volleyball and water polo, along with marathon swimming and Rowing in Long Beach harbor.

== Service ==
=== Hours and frequency ===
A Line service hours are from approximately 4:30 a.m. and 11:45 p.m. daily. Trains operate every 8 minutes during peak hours, Monday to Friday. Trains run every 10 minutes, during midday on weekdays and weekends, from 9:00 a.m. to 7:00 p.m. Night and early morning service is approximately every 20 minutes every day.

=== Connections ===
As of February 20, 2022, the following connections are available:

- Long Beach Transit: Passport
- Los Angeles Metro Bus: 60 (late night only), 232

== Station ==
Breezy and Delightful is a kinetic sculpture artwork by Paul Tzanetopoulos, installed in the station platform. Tzanetopoulos focused on designs that expresses the culture of the communities in Long Beach. The artwork features rotating, wind-driven kinetic sculptures mounted in the pylons on the station platform. Each pair of counter-rotating disks is perforated with graphic patterns, allowing sea breeze and sunlight to animate the designs and the shadows cast on the platform. The cut-out graphic patterns were inspired by Tzanetopoulos' ongoing body of work based on Marcel Duchamp's Roto Series, which uses graphic elements and illusions of 3-dimensional and conceptual structures. These rotating sculptures illustrate Duchamp's concepts and are part of Tzanetopoulos' larger interactive installation series.

== Notable places nearby ==
- Long Beach Convention and Entertainment Center
- Long Beach Terrace Theater
