= Downtown Long Beach station =

Light rail station in Long Beach, California

Downtown Long Beach
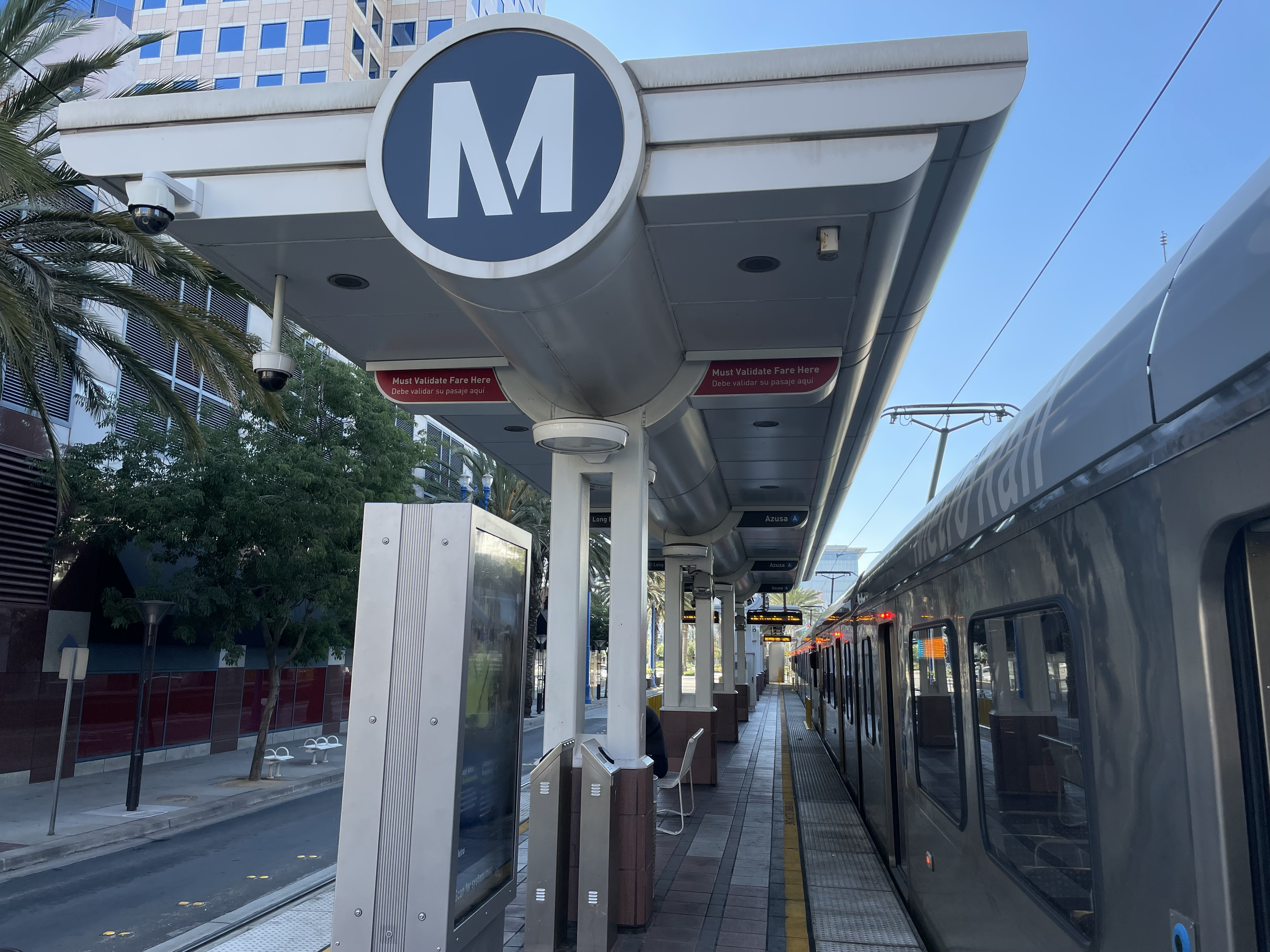
- Downtown Long Beach station platform

General information
- Location: 128 West First Street; Long Beach, California
- Coordinates: 33.7681°N 118.1932°W
- Owner: Los Angeles County Metropolitan Transportation Authority
- Platforms: 1 island platform
- Tracks: 2
- Connections: See Connections section

Construction
- Structure type: At-grade
- Parking: Paid parking nearby
- Cycle facilities: Long Beach Bike Share station and racks
- Accessible: Yes

History
- Opened: September 1, 1990; 35 years ago
- Rebuilt: October 20, 2014; June 1, 2019
- Former names: Transit Mall (1990–2013)

Passengers
- FY 2025: 2,647 (avg. wkdy boardings)

Services
Preceding station	Metro Rail	Following station
Pacific Avenue toward Pomona	A Line	1st Street One-way operation
Location

Downtown Long Beach station (formerly Transit Mall station) is an at-grade light rail station on the A Line of the Los Angeles Metro Rail system. The station is located in the middle of 1st Street between Pine Avenue and Pacific Avenue in Downtown Long Beach, California, after which the station is named. It is the southern terminus of the A Line.

It is a key part of the Long Beach Transit Mall, which extends along 1st Street between Pacific Avenue and Long Beach Boulevard. As the city's major transit center, this section of 1st Street is closed to private vehicles and only trains and transit vehicles are allowed.

In 2010, a $7 million project was undertaken by Long Beach Transit to upgrade the transit mall. New bus shelters were constructed, with improved lighting and new artwork. The project was completed in spring 2011.

During the 2028 Summer Olympics, the station will serve spectators traveling to and from venues located at the Long Beach Sports Park including handball at the Long Beach Arena, temporary facilities for Beach Volleyball and water polo, along with marathon swimming and rowing in Long Beach harbor.

== Service ==
=== Hours and frequency ===
A Line service hours are from approximately 4:30 a.m. and 11:45 p.m. daily. Trains operate every 8 minutes during peak hours, Monday to Friday. Trains run every 10 minutes, during midday on weekdays and weekends, from 9:00 a.m. to 7:00 p.m. Night and early morning service is approximately every 20 minutes every day.

=== Connections ===
The Long Beach Transit Mall is a major hub for municipal bus lines. As of December 15, 2024, the following connections are available:

- Flixbus
- Long Beach Transit: 21, 22, 23, 46, 51, 61, 71, 81, 91, 92, 93, 94, 96, 111, 112, 121, 151, 172, 173, 174, 181, 182, 191, 192, Passport
- LADOT Commuter Express: 142
- Los Angeles Metro Bus: 60 (late night only), 232
- Torrance Transit: 3, Rapid 3

=== Station ===
The station features the artwork Angel Train by Metro Art commissioned artist Patrick Mohr.

== Notable places nearby ==
The station is within walking distance of the following notable places:

- Aquarium of the Pacific
- RMS Queen Mary
- Long Beach Shoreline Marina
- Long Beach Civic Center
- Long Beach Performing Arts Center
- Pine Avenue Entertainment District
- Rainbow Harbor and Shoreline Village
- The Pike Entertainment Complex
- Grand Prix of Long Beach
