= ESTC =

ESTC may refer to:

- English Short Title Catalogue
- Lisbon Theatre and Film School (ESTC - Escola Superior de Teatro e Cinema)
- Eastside Transit Corridor
- Elastic (company), NYSE ticker ESTC
