= Chronology (disambiguation) =

Chronology is the science of locating events in time.

A chronology is a common term for a timeline.

It can also mean:

- Chronology (Bryn Haworth album), a 1989 release
- Chronology (Dom and Roland album), a 2004 release
- Chronology (Chronixx album), a 2017 release
- Chronology, a 1997 compilation by Buzzcocks
- Chronology Volume 1, a 2007 album by Christian rock band Third Day
- Chronology Volume 2, a 2007 album by Christian rock band Third Day
- "Chronology", a composition from Ornette Coleman's The Shape of Jazz to Come
- Chronology (video game), a 2014 puzzle-platform game
- Chronologie, a studio album by Jean-Michel Jarre

== See also ==
- Chronometry
- Horology, the study of time
- Timeline (disambiguation)
