= Timeline (disambiguation) =

A timeline is a graphical representation of a chronological sequence of events.

Timeline or time line may also refer to:

== Computing and technology ==
- TimeLine, project management software
  - TimeLine Product Group, former business unit of Symantec Corporation
- Timeline (Facebook), a feature of the social network Facebook

== Arts and media ==
=== Films ===
- Timeline (2003 film), a film based on Michael Crichton's 1999 novel of the same name
- Timeline (2014 film), a romantic-comedy-drama Thai film

=== Games ===
- Timeline (video game), a 2000 video game published by Eidos Interactive and based on the eponymous 1999 Michael Crichton novel
- Timeline (1985), a two-player chess variant designed by George Marino for Geo Games
- TimeLine (2003), 54-card boardgame designed by James Ernest for Cheapass Games

=== Music ===
- Time Line (AD album), 1984
- Time Lines, a 2005 album by Andrew Hill
- Time-Line, a 1983 album by Renaissance
- Timeline (Ayreon album), 2008
- Timeline (Richard Marx album), 2000
- Timeline (Mild High Club album), 2015
- Time Line (Ralph Towner album), 2005
- Timeline (The Vision Bleak album), 2016
- Timeline (Yellowjackets album), 2011
- Timeline, a member of the electro funk music group, Underground Resistance

=== Television ===
- Timeline (TV series), a 1989 educational PBS TV show
- Timeline, a BBC Two Scotland TV programme, the successor to Scotland 2016
- Timeline, a 2014 gameshow hosted by Brian Conley
- The Timeline, a documentary series developed by NFL Films

=== Other uses in arts and media ===
- Timeline (novel), a 1999 science fiction novel by Michael Crichton
- Transformers: Timelines, a collectible set of toys and fiction by Hasbro

== See also ==
- Alternate history
- Chronology
- List of timelines
- Timecode
- Timestream
- Timetable (disambiguation)
