= Time horizon =

Planned duration over which an investment or decision is expected to be held

A time horizon, also known as a planning horizon, is a fixed point of time in the future at which point certain processes will be evaluated or assumed to end. It is necessary in an accounting, finance or risk management regime to assign such a fixed horizon time so that alternatives can be evaluated for performance over the same period of time.

The most common horizons used in planning are one "quarter" (a quarter year, or three months), a year, two years, three years, four years (especially in a representative democracy where this is a quite common term of office and election cycle) and five years (in corporate planning). More far-sighted companies and government agencies may also use between ten and one hundred years. Thirty years is often used in mortgage contracts and US Treasury bonds such as the "long bond". The Forestry Commission in the UK plans over a century into the future.

Agreeing on a common time horizon for action is particularly important in global policy, as each participant will have very different time horizon habits. Achieving simultaneous policy is quite difficult without an agreement, as those taking action early may be seriously disadvantaged in competition with those taking action late on a regulatory matter. One attempt to bring about a global simultaneous policy is being attempted by the International Simultaneous Policy Organization's SIMPOL campaign.

== See also ==
- Gap financing
- Race to the bottom
- Timetable (disambiguation)
- Time preference
