= 2008 Los Angeles County Measure R =

Ballot measure in Los Angeles County, California for transportation projects

Measure R
- November 4, 2008
- County of Los Angeles Sales Tax

Results
| Choice | Votes | % |
|---|---|---|
| Yes | 2,039,214 | 67.93% |
| No | 962,569 | 32.07% |
- Los Angeles County Official Results

Measure R was a ballot measure during the November 2008 elections in Los Angeles County, California, that proposed a half-cent sales taxes increase on each dollar of taxable sales (originating in or made from Los Angeles County) for thirty years in order to pay for transportation projects and improvements. The measure was approved by voters with 67.22% of the vote, just over the two-thirds majority required by the state of California to raise local taxes. The project was touted as a way to "improve the environment by getting more Angelenos out of their cars and into the region's growing subway, light rail, and bus services." It will result in the construction or expansion of a dozen rail lines in the county.

== Funding ==
The ballot measure created an ordinance called the Traffic Relief and Rail Expansion Ordinance, which included an expenditure plan defining specific projects to be funded, timeframes for availability of funds, and expected levels of funding. The ordinance became effective on 2 January 2009 and is set to expire in year 2039. Projects to be funded include expansion of light rail and subway services, freeway expansions, and funds for local cities to spend on their own transportation infrastructure.

After the passage of Measure R in November 2008, the new sales tax rate in Los Angeles County rose to 8.75% (since 2013, 9-10%), second only to Alameda County in California (though there were a few cities whose sales tax rates exceeded the new rate). Before passage, the Los Angeles Economic Development Agency estimated that it would cost each county resident about $25 a year, and each family about $80.

=== Allocation ===
The tax is expected to raise $40 billion over thirty years. After subtracting 1.5% for administrative costs, the remaining money must be spent as follows:

- 35% for transit capital projects, e.g. new rail and bus rapid transit lines
- 3% for transit capital on the Metrolink commuter rail system
- 2% for miscellaneous transit capital, e.g. rail rolling stock, maintenance facilities
- 20% for highway capital projects
- 5% for operations on new rail lines
- 20% for bus operation improvements
- 15% for local return, i.e. transportation money that individual cities decide how to spend

== Transportation projects ==
Geographic map of the LA Metro system showing all transit projects included in Measure R

Examples of transportation projects and improvements cited by proponents of Measure R include beginning the so-called Subway to the Sea, get the Green Line light rail to Los Angeles International Airport, widen the 5 Freeway at the bottleneck before the Orange County line, and add carpool lanes. The sales tax froze regular fares until 2010 and froze fares for seniors, disabled people, students, and those on Medicare thru 14 September 2014.

Most of the projects depending on Measure R for money will require additional funding. This is because in order to secure political support, proponents aimed to offer "something for many constituencies", leading to an ambitious list of transportation projects, which relies in part on federal and state funds making up part of the funding of proposed projects, as has been the case for past projects. Planned expenditures included:

- Transit Projects
  - Eastside Transit Corridor
  - Crenshaw/LAX Line (K Line)
  - South Bay Green Line Extension
  - San Fernando Valley Interstate 405 Corridor Connection
  - San Fernando Valley Canoga Corridor
  - San Fernando Valley East North-South Rapidways
  - Southeast Gateway Line
  - D Line Extension
  - Capital Project Contingency
- Highway Projects
  - Alameda Corridor East Grade Separations Phase II
  - BNSF Grade Separations in Gateway Cities
  - Countywide Soundwall construction
  - High Desert Corridor
  - Interstate 5 / SR-14 additional capacity
  - Interstate 5 additional capacity Interstate 605 to Orange County
  - Interstate 5 additional capacity SR-134 to SR-170
  - Interstate 5 North additional capacity SR-14 to Kern County
  - Highway Operational Improvements in Arroyo Verdugo
  - Highway Operational Improvements in Las Virgenes/Malibu subregion
  - Interstate 405, Interstate 110, Interstate 105, and SR-91 Ramp and Interchange Improvements
  - Interstate 605 Hot Spot Interchanges
  - Interstate 710 North gap closure
  - Interstate 710 South early action
  - SR-138 additional capacity
  - Capital Project Contingency

== Political support ==
=== Proponents ===
Among prominent politicians, Los Angeles Mayor Antonio Villaraigosa, county Supervisor Zev Yaroslavsky, and Assemblyman Mike Feuer (D-Los Angeles) were the most vocal proponents. The Los Angeles County Federation of Labor and the Los Angeles Area Chamber of Commerce supported it.

Having donated $900,000, the Los Angeles County Museum of Art (LACMA) was the "largest single donor to the effort to raise the sales tax in the county and build more mass transit". According to LACMA surveys, the top three reasons people do not visit the museum pertain to transportation: prospective visitors "live too far, there's too much traffic, and the museum is inconvenient to freeways and mass transit".

=== Opponents ===
Los Angeles County Supervisors Michael D. Antonovich, Don Knabe, and Gloria Molina were opposed to the measure, claiming that the "spending plan favors the Westside" and denies other parts of the county such as San Fernando Valley their "fair share of sales tax revenues". MTA board member John Fasana opposed Measure R because he believed it does not "provide enough assurances" that funds will be spent as planned.

== Expansion of Measure ==
=== Measure J ===
Measure J
- November 6, 2012
- Los Angeles County Sales Tax for Transportation
- Outcome: Did not reach 2/3 supermajority; failed to pass

Results
| Yes | 66.11% |
| No | 33.89% |

The Los Angeles County Board of Supervisors decided to ask voters on the November 2012 ballot whether or not to extend the half-cent sales tax increase for an additional 30 years until 2069. The board's 10–3 vote came just one day before the opening of the expanded Metro Orange Line - the first project funded by Measure R. Proponents such as Mayor Villaraigosa maintain that it would save money by allowing Metro to take advantage of record low interest rates and construction costs, create thousands of jobs, and speed up the completion of certain projects. In order to fund more transportation projects at the present time, the measuring would permit "bonding against future revenues"—i.e., to "take out loans from the investment market that will not be paid back until beginning in 2039". The extension would not result in new transportation projects; it would merely allow projects on the current list to be completed more quickly, in 10 years instead of 30. The proposal, Measure J, went before the voters on November 6, 2012. It failed to pass, receiving 66.1% of the vote where 66.7% was required.

=== Measure M ===
Measure M
- November 8, 2016
- Los Angeles County Traffic Improvement Plan

Results
| Choice | Votes | % |
|---|---|---|
| Yes | 2,259,654 | 71.15% |
| No | 916,375 | 28.85% |
- Los Angeles County Official Results

On the November 2016 ballot, LACMTA proposed a $120 billion plan to expand upon Measure R, adding new transit projects and expediting others previously approved under Measure R. The plan, known as Measure M, would make measure R permanent and add an additional half-cent sales tax. Measure M passed with 70.15% of the vote, clearing the two-thirds majority required. The horizon year for the tax is 2057.

Measure M programmed funding for the following projects:

- LAX/Metro Transit Center connection to SkyLink
- D Line Extension Phase 3
- High Desert Corridor (cancelled in 2019)
- Interstate 5 capacity increase
- Foothill Extension
- North Hollywood to Pasadena Bus Rapid Transit Project
- East San Fernando Valley Light Rail Transit Project
- Southeast Gateway Line (Phases 1 & 2)
- K Line Track Enhancement
- SR-71 freeway gap
- Los Angeles River bicycle path
- Sepulveda Transit Corridor (Phases 1 & 2)
- Vermont Transit Corridor
- SR-57/SR-60 Interchange capacity increase
- K Line Extension to Torrance
- Interstate 710 South Corridor Project (Phases 1 & 2)
- Interstate 105 Express Lanes
- Eastside Transit Corridor
- K Line Northern Extension
- Interstate 405/Interstate 110 Interchange capacity increase
- Interstate 605/Interstate 10 Interchange
- SR-60/Interstate 605 HOV Direct Connectors
- Lincoln Boulevard Transit Corridor
- Interstate 110 express lane extension
- Interstate 405 South Bay curve project
- C Line extension to Norwalk/Santa Fe Springs Metrolink
- San Fernando Valley Transit Improvements
- G Line conversion to light rail
- City of San Fernando Bike Master Plan
- Los Angeles Streetcar

In March 2020, the City of Inglewood reallocated $233 million from Measure M highway improvement funds to help finance the Inglewood Transit Connector people mover.

== See also ==
- Los Angeles Metro Rail
- Los Angeles County Metropolitan Transportation Authority
- Twenty-eight by '28
