= Inglewood Transit Connector =

Proposed transit project in Inglewood, California

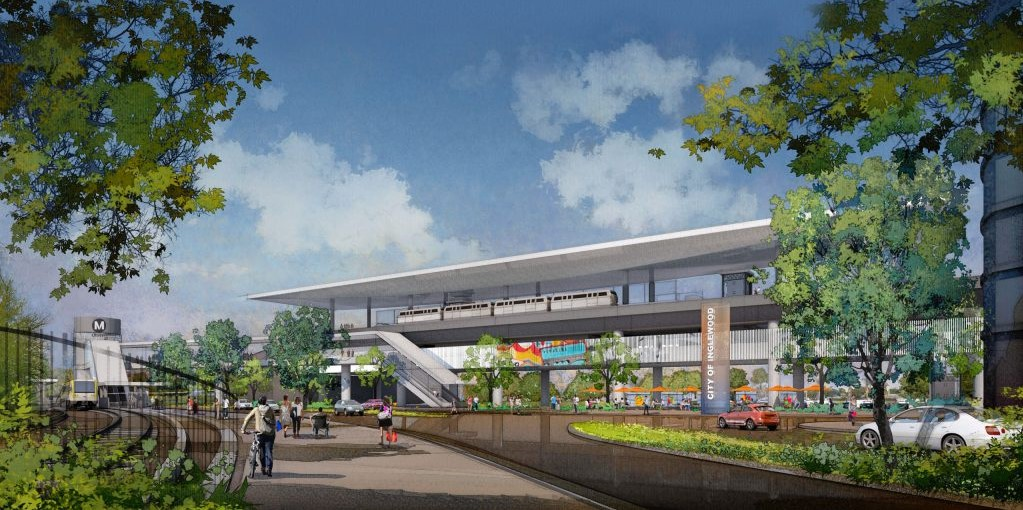
- Rendering of the proposed Inglewood Transit Connector

Overview
- Status: Active
- Owner: City of Inglewood
- Locale: Inglewood, California
- Termini: Market Street Station; Intuit Dome Station
- Stations: 5
- Website: inglewoodtransitconnector.com

Service
- Type: Automated people mover
- Operator: Elevate Inglewood Partners

Technical
- Line length: 1.6 mi (2.6 km)
- Character: Fully elevated

The Inglewood Transit Connector Project is a proposed transit improvement project with dedicated bus lanes in Inglewood, California, United States. The project was originally proposed as a 1.6-mile (2.6 km) fully elevated, automated people mover system connecting the Downtown Inglewood station on the K Line of the Los Angeles Metro Rail system to the major sports and entertainment venues in the city: Kia Forum, SoFi Stadium, Hollywood Park Casino, and Intuit Dome. The project planned to break ground in 2024 and begin operations in late 2027, ahead of the 2028 Summer Olympics that will use some of the venues. After funding rejections, the project transitioned to a transit improvement project with dedicated bus lanes, although the automated people mover is said to still be on the table for the future.

The project is managed by the Inglewood Transit Connector Joint Powers Authority (ITCJPA), a partnership between the City of Inglewood and the Los Angeles County Metropolitan Transportation Authority (Metro).

== History ==
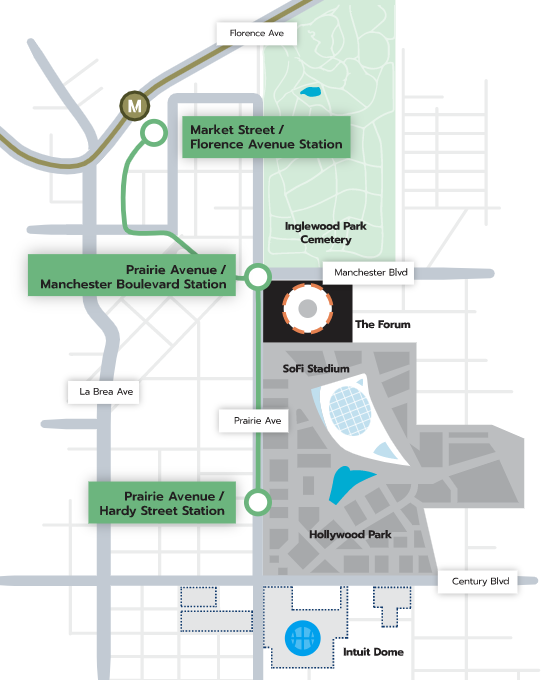
Map of the proposed Inglewood Transit Connector

The project was part of the Envision Inglewood plan, that was the culmination of several transportation and mobility initiatives to be undertaken by the City including a citywide event transportation management and operations plan, mobility plan, neighborhood protection plan, and the Inglewood Transit Connector Project that would connect the under-construction Downtown Inglewood station on the Metro K Line to Kia Forum, SoFi Stadium, mixed-use development at Hollywood Park, and Intuit Dome.

In April 2020, the City was awarded $95.2 million from the California State Transportation Agency's Transit and Intercity Rail Capital Program, and in July 2021 Metro allocated $233.7 million in Measure R sales tax funds. As of 2021, the City has secured approximately $328.9 million in committed funding for the implementation of the Project out of the $2 billion dollars needed. By the close of 2023, the project had secured $873 million in local, state, and federal funds. In January 2024, the FTA announced a $1 billion commitment towards the project via a Capital Investment Grant, covering 50% of the approximately $2 billion total project cost.

The City planned to complete the project using an alternative delivery approach known as public–private partnership. In December 2021, the City launched the procurement process for the project with two parallel requests for qualifications (RFQ) issued to the private sector: one for the design, construction, financing, operations and maintenance of the project and one for the proposed the transit technology to be used.

On April 1, 2024, the ITCJPA officially began pre-construction work on the project, starting with utility relocations on Prairie Avenue and intersecting streets between Manchester Avenue and Century Boulevard.

On July 22, 2024, the city of Inglewood announced that the project would be built and operated by Elevate Inglewood Partners. The partnership includes Tutor Perini Corporation as lead contractor, Parsons Transportation Group as lead design company, a joint venture of Alternate Concepts, Inc. and Plenary Americas as lead operations and maintenance provider, and Woojin Industrial Systems as rolling stock technology provider.

=== Loss of support and transition ===
Representative Maxine Waters, who had supported the project early on, came out against the project on July 18, 2024, writing a letter to Transportation Secretary Pete Buttigieg calling the project ridiculous and too costly as it would only serve the needs of visitors to the sports and entertainment venues and would not provide convenient connectivity for local residents. After the letter went out, the House stripped $200 million in funding for the project from a draft budget bill.

At about the same time, Rams owner Stan Kroenke and Clippers owner Steve Ballmer came out against the project over concerns that it would cut into their property and could lead to the loss of a traffic lane outside of their stadiums. After the funding denial and amid opposition by Waters, Kroenke and Ballmer, Inglewood mayor James Butts conceded that the project was likely dead. He told the Los Angeles Times, "I don’t give up on anything, but I am realistic. It was voted down. So, for all intents and purposes, that’s it."

Initial cost of the project in 2018 was between $600 and $700 million. Costs ballooned to $2.2 billion by 2024. With funds coming from the federal government, the State of California and from Los Angeles County, it was not enough to cover the cost. Inglewood proposed using Measure M funds allocated to the South Bay region of Los Angeles. The South Bay Cities Council of Government denied the project an additional $493 million in October 2024 which was needed to build the line. It jeopardized the $1 billion of federal matching funds. The loss of local support due to cost ultimately stopped the people mover project. The revised project will focus on traffic relief and developing connected, walkable neighborhoods for residents and visitors by adding mobility hubs, bus-only lanes, and bike infrastructure.

== System ==
The automated transit system was planned to be fully elevated and travel from the Metro K Line's Downtown Inglewood Station at Market Street / Florence Avenue southbound along Market Street, eastbound along Manchester Boulevard, southbound along Prairie Avenue and terminate at Hardy Avenue. The original Project planned to have three stations including one at Market Street / Florence Avenue, Manchester Boulevard / Prairie Avenue, and Hardy Street / Prairie Avenue. In 2026, the Manchester Boulevard / Prairie Avenue location served as one of the several bus transit hubs for the FIFA World Cup for games at Sofi Stadium.

In 2026, when the Project was switched to a bus transit, the mobility hubs were updated to include three new smaller ones at Hawthorne Boulevard / 111th Street (within walking distance of the C Line's Hawthorne / Lennox station), Market Street / Manchester Boulevard, and Market / Hillcrest Boulevard. The main hub will be at Market Street / Florence Avenue station from the original project, with a pedestrian bridge connecting to the K Line's Downtown Inglewood station. Routes will be a mix between dedicated bus lanes and mixed traffic, with Phase 2 planning to deliver the automated people mover as the original project intended.
