= Timetable (disambiguation) =

A timetable is a kind of schedule that sets out times at which specific events are intended to occur. It may also refer to:

- School timetable, a table for coordinating students, teachers, rooms, and other resources
- Time horizon, a fixed point of time in the future at which point certain processes will be evaluated or assumed to end
- Timeline, a project artifact. It is typically a graphic design showing a long bar labeled with dates alongside itself and (usually) events labeled on points where they would have happened. It is used to show events along a period of time
- "Time Table", a track on the 1972 album Foxtrot, by English progressive rock band Genesis
- Time Table (film), a 1956 American black-and-white crime film noir

== Transport ==
- Airline timetable, booklets that many airlines worldwide use to inform passengers of several different things, such as schedules, fleet, security, in-flight entertainment, food menu, restriction and phone contact information
- Public transport timetable, a listing of the times that public transport services arrive and depart specified locations
- Timetable and train order, a method of railroad traffic control

== See also ==
- Schedule
