= International Simultaneous Policy Organization =

International Simultaneous Policy Organisation
- Founded: 2000
- Founder: John Bunzl
- Location: Global
- Key people: John Bunzl (Coordinator) and Gill Wright (International Outreach)
- Website: http://www.simpol.org

The International Simultaneous Policy Organisation (ISPO) is a voluntary organization that promotes the Simultaneous Policy (Simpol) campaign. It was founded by British businessman, John Bunzl, in 2000.

== Description ==
The ISPO describes itself as "a growing association of citizens world-wide who aim to use their votes in a new, co-ordinated and effective way to drive all nations to co-operate in solving our planetary crisis". It believes that transnational citizen action is vital because "global markets and multinational corporations so comprehensively overpower individual nations that no politician dares make the first move to solve global problems for fear of competitive disadvantage".

ISPO aims to overcomes this paralysis by bringing all nations to adopt in principle - and then to simultaneously implement - the Simultaneous Policy (Simpol), a range of democratically formulated regulations to bring about economic justice, environmental security and peace around the world.

By supporting Simpol, ISPO's citizen-members pledge to vote in future elections for ANY political party or candidate - within reason - that has signed a pledge to implement Simpol's range of measures only when all or sufficient other governments have also signed. ISPO argues that, as more and more citizens act in this way, politicians will have no choice but to sign the Pledge if they wish to remain in office, or else they risk losing their seats to other politicians who have adopted it. One of its slogans is "Use Your Vote to Take Back the World!"

== What is Simultaneous Policy? ==
Simultaneous policy requires governments in all jurisdictions at once, worldwide, to implement a policy shift at once, so that none is disadvantaged or unfairly advantaged.

The idea of the need for simultaneity of sovereign state action is not itself a new idea - it is the basis of treaty and United Nations initiatives that nothing can be done on certain problems, such as disarmament, until all major players agree to a common timetable of implementing solutions.

However, according to the process offered by ISPO, what appears to be new is that citizens who "adopt" the Simultaneous Policy (Simpol) take the formulation of global policy into their own hands. Furthermore, according to ISPO, their adoption of Simpol represents their pledge to vote in future elections, not for a particular politician or political party, but for ANY politician or party - within reason - that pledges to implement Simpol's package of policies alongside other governments. With more and more parliamentary seats and even entire elections increasingly being won or lost on very small margins, a relatively small number of Simpol adopters have the opportunity, ISPO claims, to make it in the strong interests of all politicians and parties to pledge to implement Simpol's policy package while also making it potentially disastrous for them if they fail to do so. As such, ISPO claims that civil society, through its adoption of Simpol, can for the first time lead governments, rather than governments leading the people.

The International Labour Organization and GlobalGreens both recommend certain simultaneous policy initiatives, and closer coordination of their members in many nations. Such cooperation is seen as a way to work within a competitive global market economy without disadvantaging the most 'progressive' players who strongly protect ecology and the worker.

Simultaneous initiatives are seen as a way to avoid Prisoner's dilemma type problems, wherein there is a strong reward for defecting, and a risk for going along with a proposed plan if there is even one defector.

Another example problem of this nature is agricultural subsidies to domestic farmers. A nation abolishing such subsidies stands to lose much of its family farm infrastructure to cheap imports unless a simultaneous initiative in another country, or in tax, tariff and trade to make up for lost subsidies, takes place. As this example suggests, the policies that are put in place simultaneously may be more complex than initially realized, and may require the cooperation of multiple branches or levels of government within one country, in addition to global cooperation.

== Diversity of Support ==
Individuals and politicians who have adopted ISPO's simultaneous policy have come from all parts of the political spectrum.

"SP provides a global regulatory and governance framework within which global free markets can operate freely, fairly, and within sustainable environmental limits." John Bunzl.

== Scope ==
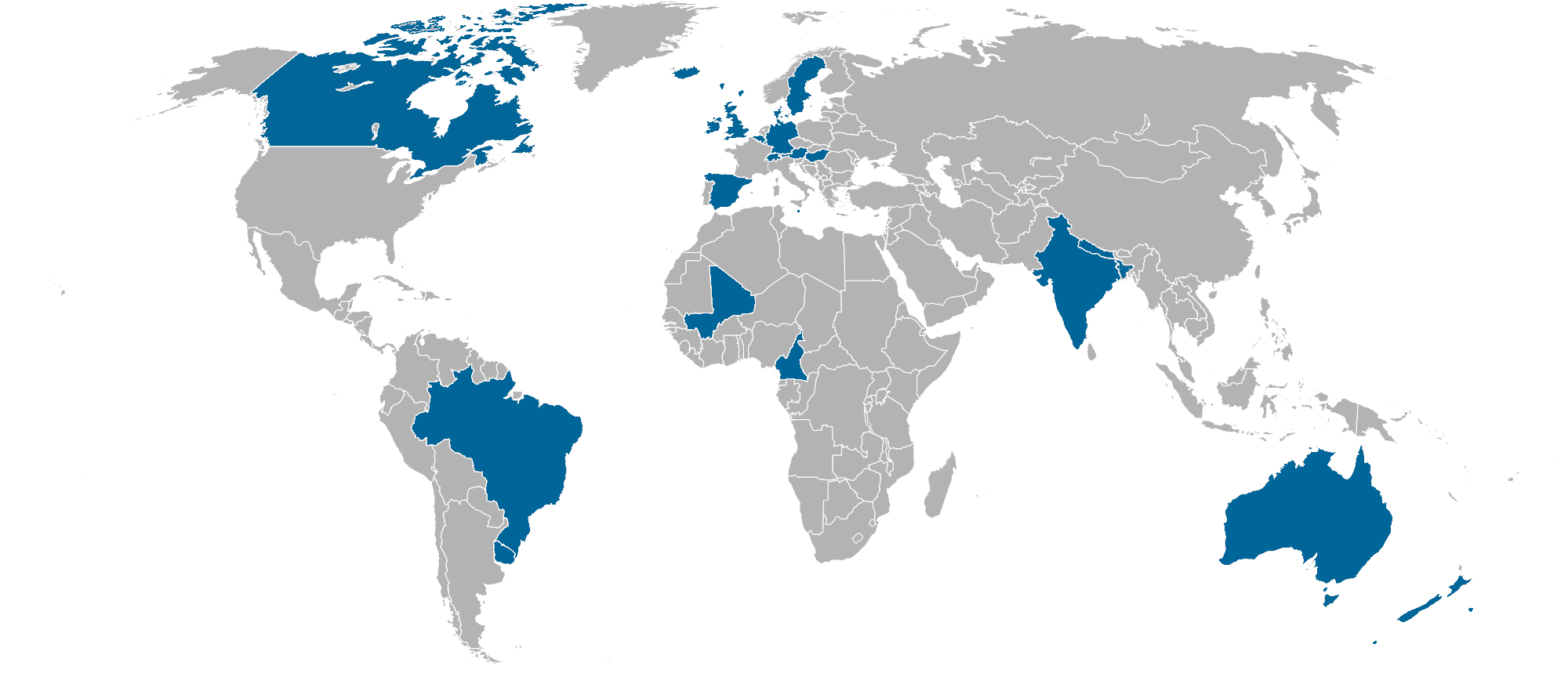
World map showing areas covered by Simultaneous Policy (Simpol) campaign in blue.

The Simultaneous Policy presently has campaigns running in twenty seven countries:

Australia, Austria, Bangladesh, Belgium, Brazil, Cameroon, Canada, Denmark, East Africa region, Germany, Hungary, Iceland, India, Ireland, Italy, Luxembourg, Mali, Malta, Nepal, New Zealand, Nigeria, Pakistan, Spain, Sweden, Switzerland, United Kingdom and Uruguay

As the United Kingdom was first to campaign it has more politicians who have signed the pledge. These politicians come from across the political spectrum:

- Conservative Party: Philip Hollobone MP (2006), John Penrose MP (2005), Henry Smith MP (2010)
- Green Party: Caroline Lucas MP (2004)
- Labour: Roger Godsiff MP (2007), John McDonnell MP (2005), Catherine McKinnell MP (2010), Grahame Morris MP (2010)
- Liberal Democrat: Tom Brake MP (2007), Annette Brooke MP (2010), Lorely Jane Burt MP (2006), Mike Crockart MP (2010), Lynne Featherstone MP (2006), Don Foster MP (2006), Duncan Hames MP (2005), Andrew George MP (2004), Mike Hancock MP (2004), Martin Horwood MP (2007), John Leech MP (2010), Stephen Lloyd MP (2010), Adrian Sanders MP (2005), Mark Williams MP (2006)
- Plaid Cymru: Elfyn Llwyd MP (2010)

Individuals who have signed but are no longer MPs are: Conservative Party: Sir Richard Body; Labour: Celia Barlow, Tony Benn; Liberal Democrat: Lembit Öpik, John Hemming

In addition, there exists a growing number of Simpol partner organisations that support the democratic aims and principles of the Simultaneous Policy. These include the Canadian Action Party and the Global Justice Movement.

The Australian Federal Election of October 2004 saw 59 candidates pledge their support for Simpol.

In the UK 200+ candidates for the elections of 2010 pledged to implement the Simultaneous Policy, of whom 24 were elected as MPs. Former President of East Timor José Ramos-Horta has pledged his support for the policy.

== See also ==
- National Popular Vote Interstate Compact
- Free trade zone
- Treaty
- Hegemony
- World government
