= Timeline (TV series) =

- Genre: Educational
- Created by: Leo Eaton
- Countries of origin: United States; United Kingdom; Spain; Turkey
- No. of episodes: 6

Production
- Production companies: Maryland Public Television (MPT); Holmes Associates; Televisión Española (TVE); Turkish Radio and Television Corporation (TRT)

Timeline is a 1989 American/British/Spanish/Turkish educational television series that aired on PBS, presenting historical events from the Middle Ages in the style of newscasts. Six episodes of the series were produced.

The series was created, written and directed by Leo Eaton through Maryland Public Television (MPT). Producers were Diane Holmes of Holmes Associates in London, UK, Fernando de Castro Lopez of Televisión Española (TVE), and Altug Savasal of Turkish Radio and Television Corporation (TRT). It was filmed on location during summer 1988 on the Isle of Man in the UK and in Spain and Turkey, with the anchor newsroom created at Maryland Public TV in the United States. Timeline evolved from a series of similar television shorts for children created by Gary Witt and produced by Leo Eaton earlier in the 1980s, called Newscast from the Past. Gary Witt was also a co-producer on Timeline.

In Timeline, news anchor Steve Bell (a real-life news anchor, playing himself) and four ethnically diverse field reporters – "Siboletto of Zimbabwe" (Fran Dorn), "Owen of Canarfon" (Robert Bathurst), "Luis de Jaen" (Iñaki Aierra) and "Selim Karasi" (Engin Cezzar) – report from six watershed events in human history between 1066 and 1492. The series owed some of its inspiration to Walter Cronkite's You Are There, which aired on CBS from 1953 to 1957. Timeline also included faux commercials for products and services first available at that time in history. While the premiere episode "The Crusades" aired to good ratings and received extensive press coverage, PBS's decision to broadcast each half-hour episode only on a bi-monthly basis (paired with comedian Mark Russell's half-hour satirical TV specials) provided no audience continuity and the series soon disappeared from public view.

== Production ==
With a budget in excess of two million dollars for just six half hours, Timeline was one of PBS's most expensive productions for that time. Funding was provided by Texas-based Meadows Foundation, PBS, the Corporation for Public Broadcasting, Maryland Public Television, Holmes Associates in London (UK), Televisión Española and Turkish Radio & Television.

While each partner country was responsible for crew and cast on their own locations, an international team of department heads supervised overall production. With creator and director Leo Eaton at its head, this team - consisting of series producer Diane Holmes, Hollywood production designer Peter Wooley, Spanish costume designer Gumersindo Andrés López, and British production manager Brian True-May – spent three months commuting between production centers in Madrid, Istanbul and London before filming finally began on the Isle of Man (UK) in the summer of 1978.

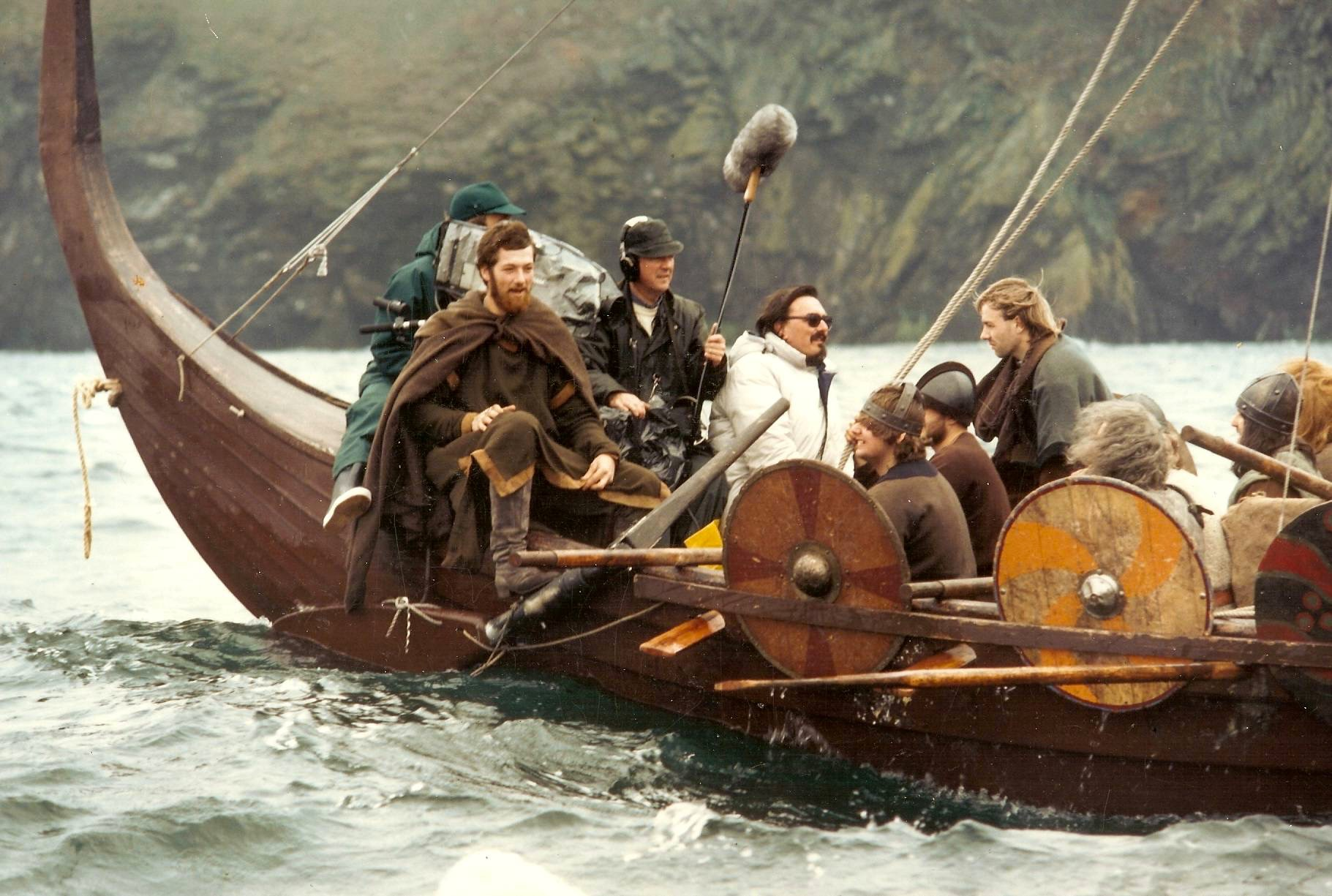
Director Leo Eaton and crew filming on Viking Longship in Isle of Man

The four field reporters were cast from the four partner countries. American actress Fran Dorn played Siboletto of Zimbabwe, British actor Robert Bathurst played Owen of Canarfon, Spanish actor Iñaki Aierra played Luis de Jaen and Turkish actor Engin Cezzar played Selim Karasi. News anchor Steve Bell (formerly news anchor of ABC's Good Morning America) played himself.

== Episode list ==
The show's episodes were originally aired out of order.

=== Episode 1 - "The Vikings" ===
"Vikings" was the third of the six 'history as news' episodes to be shown by PBS in 1989, focusing on 1066AD when William the Conqueror was preparing to invade England, just as the Norse invasion of England by Harald Hardradi had been defeated by England's Saxon King Harold. Reporters Owen of Canarfon (Robert Bathurst), Siboletto of Zimbabwe (Fran Dorn), Louis de Jaen (Inaqui Aierra) & Selim Karasi (Engin Cezzar) report from Normandy, England and from Iceland as they look at how the Vikings have developed from their initial pirate raids on England and Europe to become a major European power; the Normans are Viking descendants. With the future of England hanging in the balance, anchorman Steve Bell reveals the events that have led to this watershed moment in European history.

=== Episode 2 - "The Crusades" ===
"Crusades" was the first of the six 'history as news' episodes to be shown by PBS in 1989, focusing on the conquest of the Crusader kingdom of Jerusalem by Sultan Saladin, and giving the back story of the Crusades up to that point. Reporters Owen of Canarfon (Robert Bathurst), Siboletto of Zimbabwe (Fran Dorn), Louis de Jaen (Inaqui Aierra) & Selim Karasi (Engin Cezzar) report from both sides of the conflict, moderated by anchorman Steve Bell (himself).

=== Episode 3 - "The Mongols" ===
"The Mongols" was the fifth of the six 'history as news' episodes to be shown by PBS in 1989, focusing on the threat that the Mongols would invade Western Europe in 1247AD after overrunning much of Asia and creating one of the greatest empires ever to exist, stretching from China through Russia to the borders of Europe itself. Although Genghis Khan is now dead, his successors are continuing to expand the empire as European leaders struggle to understand this deadly threat from the east. Reporters Owen of Canarfon (Robert Bathurst), Siboletto of Zimbabwe (Fran Dorn), Louis de Jaen (Inaqui Aierra) & Selim Karasi (Engin Cezzar) report from both sides of the conflict, moderated by anchorman Steve Bell who explains the secrets of Mongol military success.

=== Episode 4 - "The Black Death" ===
"Black Death" was the second of the six 'history as news' episodes to be shown by PBS in 1989, focusing on the second pandemic of the Black Death, the plague that first decimated populations around the world in 1346–53. In 1361 it has returned again and reporters Owen of Canarfon (Robert Bathurst), Siboletto of Zimbabwe (Fran Dorn), Louis de Jaen (Inaqui Aierra) & Selim Karasi (Engin Cezzar) are following the path of contagion as it sweeps west from Asia to devastate Europe for the second time in a generation. As usual, anchorman Steve Bell reports from the Timeline studios.

=== Episode 5 - "The Fall of Constantinople" ===
"The Fall of Constantinople" was the fourth of the six 'history as news' episodes to be shown by PBS in 1989, focusing on the final destruction of the Byzantine Roman Empire when Ottoman Sultan Mehmet (the Conqueror) conquered Constantinople in 1453AD. Reporters Owen of Canarfon (Robert Bathurst), Siboletto of Zimbabwe (Fran Dorn), Louis de Jaen (Inaqui Aierra) & Selim Karasi (Engin Cezzar) report from both sides of the conflict, moderated by anchorman Steve Bell who reveals the events that have led up to this final destruction of an empire that has lasted for more than 1500 years.

=== Episode 6 - "Granada" ===
"Granada" was the sixth and final episode in the 'history as news' series first shown by PBS in 1989. In 1492 the long reconquest of Muslim Spain by Christian forces comes to an end when King Ferdinand and Queen Isabella of Spain accept the surrender of the City of Granada from Sultan Boabdil. On the heels of the army comes the Spanish Inquisition, and the Muslim and Jewish inhabitants of the city question what will happen next. Reporters Owen of Canarfon (Robert Bathurst), Siboletto of Zimbabwe (Fran Dorn), Louis de Jaen (Inaqui Aierra) and Selim Karasi (Engin Cezzar) report from both sides of the conflict, moderated by anchorman Steve Bell who explains the back story of a 'Reconquesta' that has taken 700 years.

== See also ==
- You Are There (series)
