= Eastside Transit Corridor =

Future light rail line extension in Los Angeles County, California

Eastside Transit Corridor Phase 2
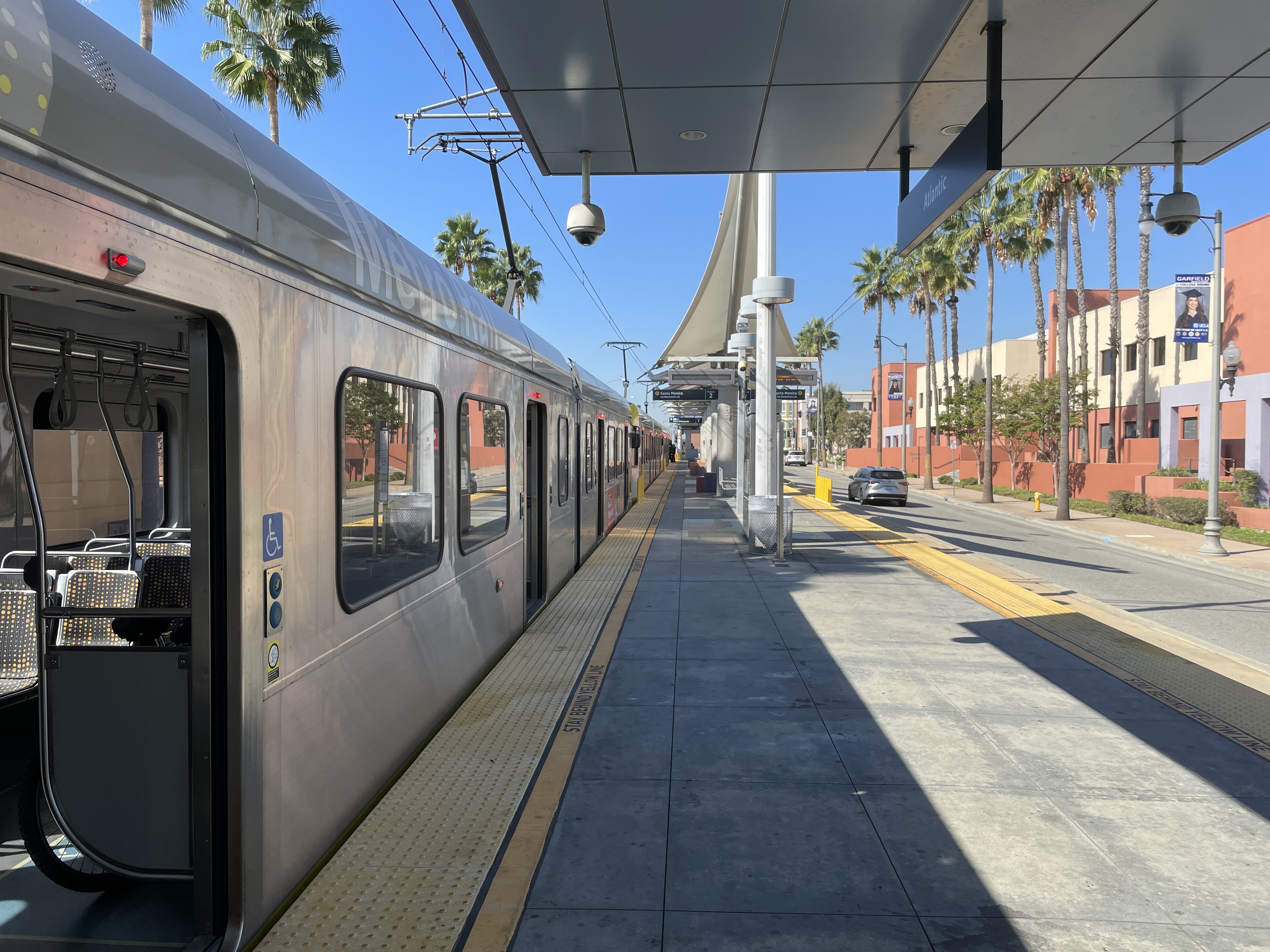
- Atlantic station in East Los Angeles, to be relocated

Overview
- Status: Studying ongoing
- Locale: Los Angeles, East Los Angeles, Commerce, Montebello, Pico Rivera, Whittier
- Termini: Atlantic; Greenwood (Phase 2A) Lambert (Phase 2B)

Service
- Type: Light rail
- System: Los Angeles Metro Rail
- Operator(s): Los Angeles Metro

History
- Opened: 2035; 9 years' time (Phase 2A); TBD (Phase 2B)

Technical
- Track gauge: 4 ft 8 1/2 in (1,435 mm) standard gauge
- Electrification: Overhead line, 750 V DC

The Eastside Transit Corridor Phase 2 project plans to extend the Los Angeles Metro Rail E Line further southeast to connect with the Gateway Cities, continuing from a relocated Atlantic station southeast to a new Lambert station in Whittier. The extension is considered Phase 2, following the Gold Line Eastside Extension, retroactively considered Phase 1, which extended the then-Gold Line from Union Station to the current Atlantic station.

== Overview ==
Los Angeles Metro has studied two alternative alignments for this extension. In 2015, Metro estimated the cost of both alignments of what was then known as the Gold Line Eastside Rail Extension at $6.0 billion (to be delivered in 2057). The plan included in the Measure M transportation funding measure is to build improvements in stages. In 2009, Metro published the Eastside Transit Corridor Phase 2 Final Alternatives Analysis Report, and in 2014 published a Draft Environmental Impact Statement/Environmental Impact Report. In February 2020, the Metro Board voted to eliminate the SR 60 alignment and combined alignment alternatives from consideration, and proceed only with the Washington Boulevard alternative of the project. The SR 60 line may be considered for construction in the future. Construction is scheduled to begin in 2029, with public service by 2035, though the project's timeline may be accelerated under the Twenty-eight by '28 initiative.

Metro merged the portion of the L Line east of Downtown Los Angeles into the E Line (which now uses the gold color instead of aqua) upon the completion of the Regional Connector Transit Project on June 16, 2023. This allows for a one-seat ride for travelers as far west as Santa Monica, with transfers to other lines at downtown stations.

In 2022, Metro recommended building the extension in phases — initially running as far as Greenwood Avenue in Montebello. Under the plan, the full extension would be studied to make way for the construction to Whittier when funds become available.

== Proposed routings and modes ==
The Transit Corridor Project was originally proposed as a light rail route along Washington Boulevard. Metro studied three alternatives during its Initial Operating Study: along California State Route 60, the original concept to Whittier, and a project that built both routings. The combined routes would have served the communities of Montebello, Commerce, Pico Rivera, Monterey Park, South El Monte, South San Gabriel, Rosemead, Santa Fe Springs and Whittier in the east side of the county. All alternatives begin at the E Line's Atlantic station and head east.

Metro ruled out the SR 60 Freeway and combined alternative, leaving just the Washington Boulevard alternative for further consideration and study. A new maintenance yard is included as part of the extension.

Alternatives	Alignments	New trips (daily)	Estimated cost (billions)
Alternative 1: LRT	SR-60 Alternative	TBD	TBD
Alternative 2: LRT	Washington Boulevard Alternative	TBD	TBD
Alternative 3: LRT	Combined Alternative	TBD	TBD

During the Initial Operating Segment study, Metro concluded that Alternative 1 and 3 would interfere with future SR 60 expansions. Metro would have to buy some property and remove homes needed for a maintenance facility yard, as no large vacant lots were found. In February 2020, Metro staff recommended Alternative 2, removing the route along the SR 60 freeway (Alternative 1) from further consideration, therefore also eliminating Alternative 3 in the process. Metro will focus on further studying and building the Washington Boulevard alternative.

=== Route selection: Alternative 2 ===
Projected opening	Station	City/Neighborhood	Notes
2035	Atlantic	East Los Angeles	To be relocated.
2035	Atlantic/Whittier	East Los Angeles	
2035	Commerce/Citadel	Commerce	To be adjacent to the Citadel Outlets.
2035	Greenwood	Montebello	
TBD	Rosemead	Pico Rivera	
TBD	Norwalk	Whittier	
TBD	Lambert	Whittier	

On April 25, 2024, Metro published the final environmental impact report (EIR) for the project, pending certification from its board of directors. Metro is also seeking to clear the project under the National Environmental Policy Act (NEPA) to qualify it for federal grant money. On May 23, 2024, the Metro board of directors certified the final EIR at a board meeting.
