= Neogov =

American software company

Governmentjobs.com, Inc.
- Trade name: Neogov
- Type: Private
- Industry: Software
- Founded: 2000; 26 years ago
- Founders: Ward Komers; Damir Davidovic
- Headquarters: El Segundo, California, U.S.
- Key people: Shane Evangelist (CEO)
- Services: Software as a service
- Website: neogov.com

Governmentjobs.com, Inc., doing business as Neogov, is an American software-as-a-service company that develops cloud-based human resource management used in the public sector. It is headquartered in El Segundo, California, and was founded by Ward Komers and Damir Davidovic in 2000. The company's software is used by government and educational institutions for applicant tracking, onboarding, training, payroll, and compliance management. Neogov also operates GovernmentJobs.com. As of 2022, Neogov's platform was used by over 13,000 organizations in government and education. Its current CEO is Shane Evangelist.

== Overview ==
The company operates under a software-as-a-service model to provide cloud-based human resource management. Its software is used by state and local organizations, including government and law enforcement agencies. Its recruiting software is used in applicant tracking, recruiting and screening. It provides onboarding and HR management software used for managing employee records, payroll, benefits and timekeeping. It has also developed platforms for learning management and employee training, performance management, and policy and compliance management.

The company also runs the employment portal GovernmentJobs.com, which hosted an estimated 40% of state and local government jobs filled between 2022 and 2024.

== History ==
The company was founded on January 6, 2000 by Ward Komers and Damir Davidovic, and is headquartered in El Segundo, California.

In October 2016, Neogov received an investment from private equity firm Warburg Pincus, which was the company's first major outside funding. This investment supported the company’s expansion and product development efforts. The company was included on the Inc. 5000 list of the fastest growing private companies in the United States several times between 2009 and 2019. Following the Warburg Pincus deal, Neogov began to grow through strategic acquisitions.

In 2017, the company made its first acquisition by purchasing FirstNet Learning, a Denver-based online workforce training company. In 2018, Neogov acquired High Line Corporation, an Ontario, Canada-based provider of HR, payroll, and benefits software. At the time, Neogov had over 6,000 public-sector and education clients after this acquisition. In December 2020, Neogov announced a planned merger with PowerDMS, a cloud-based policy compliance and law enforcement accreditation software company. The merger was completed in early 2021.

In 2021, Neogov received an investment from The Carlyle Group and Warburg Pincus. The terms were not publicly disclosed, but the investment reportedly valued Neogov at over $1 billion, making it a unicorn. Neogov subsequently undertook a series of acquisitions in the public safety tech sector. In January 2022, the company acquired three law enforcement technology firms, including employee scheduling software PlanIt Schedule, field training management software Agency360, and CueHit which provides citizen feedback and engagement tools for police departments. In June 2023, it acquired Discover eGov, an HR software company based in New York that provided software to civil service and local government.

It has frequently been included in the GovTech 100 list of public sector technology companies.

As of 2022, the company served over 13,000 agencies in the public sector. In September 2024, the company launched Vetted, which is used in the background investigation process in the hiring of law enforcement by government agencies.

In July 2025, private equity firms EQT AB and the Canada Pension Plan Investment Board (CPP Investments) agreed to buy Neogov from Warburg Pincus and Carlyle Group for approximately $3 billion. In September 2025, the acquisition received approval from the European Commission under the EU Merger Regulation.

In March 2026, the company acquired PowerDetails, a software platform used by public safety agencies to manage off-duty law enforcement scheduling and special event assignments. In April 2026, Neogov acquired Miller Mendel Inc., a provider of background investigation software used by law enforcement agencies.
