= El Segundo, California =

- City
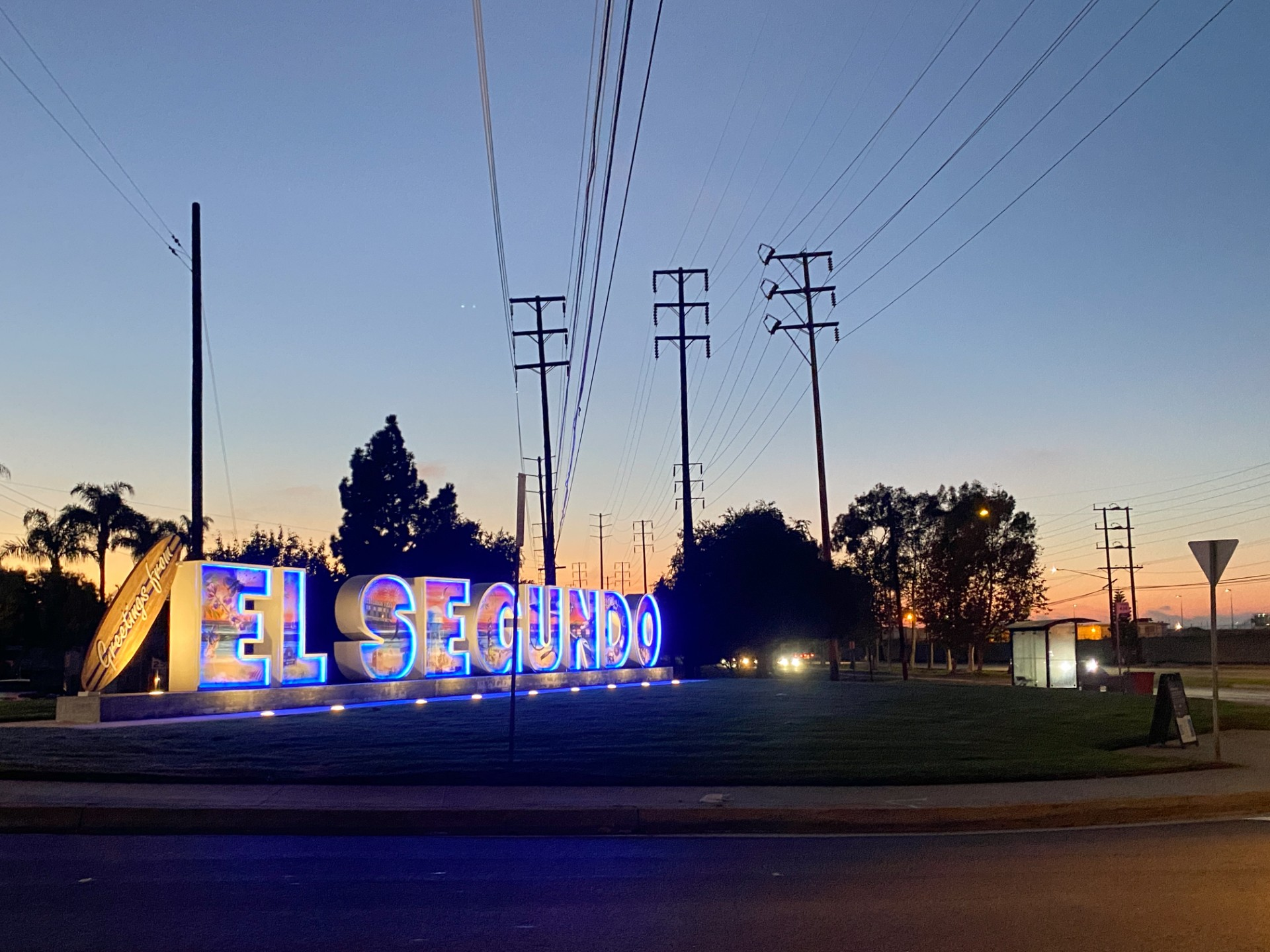
- El Segundo's new welcome signage installed in 2024

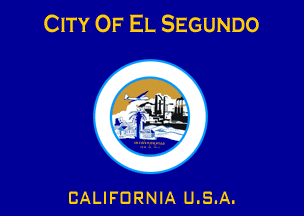
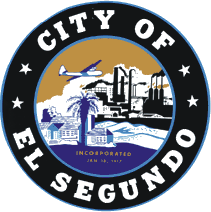
- Flag Seal
- Nickname: The Aerospace Capital of the World
- Interactive map of El Segundo, California
- Location of El Segundo in the United States
- Coordinates: 33°55′17″N 118°24′22″W
- Country: United States
- State: California
- County: Los Angeles
- Incorporated: January 18, 1917

Government
  - Type: Council Manager
  - Mayor: Chris Pimentel
  - Mayor Pro Tem: Ryan Baldino
  - City council: Drew Boyles; Lance Giroux; Michelle Keldorf
  - City Clerk: Susan Truax
  - City Treasurer: Matthew Robinson

Area
  - Total: 10.76 sq mi (27.87 km^{2})
  - Land: 5.46 sq mi (14.15 km^{2})
  - Water: 5.30 sq mi (13.72 km^{2})
- Elevation: 115 ft (35 m)

Population (2020)
  - Total: 17,272
  - Density: 3,161.6/sq mi (1,220.7/km^{2})
- Time zone: UTC−8 (Pacific)
  - Summer (DST): UTC−7 (PDT)
- ZIP Code: 90245
- Area codes: 310/424
- FIPS code: 06-22412
- GNIS feature IDs: 1660605, 2410417
- Website: elsegundo.gov

El Segundo (/ˌɛl səˈɡʌndoʊ/ EL sə-GUN-doh, Spanish: [el seˈɣundo]; Spanish for 'The Second') is a city in Los Angeles County, California, United States. Located on Santa Monica Bay, it was incorporated on January 18, 1917, and is part of the South Bay Cities Council of Governments. The population was 17,272 as of the 2020 census, a 3.7% increase from 16,654 in the 2010 census. A significant center of the oil and aerospace industries in Southern California, roughly three quarters of the city's land is dedicated exclusively to industrial and commercial uses, including a Chevron oil refinery which takes up more than a quarter of the city.

== History ==
The Tongva (or Gabrieleños) Native American tribes inhabited the area of El Segundo and the Los Angeles coastal area when the Spanish arrived. The area was once a part of Rancho Sausal Redondo ("Round Willow Patch Ranch"). Rancho Sausal Redondo extended from Playa Del Rey in the north to Redondo Beach in the south. Originally a Mexican land grant owned by Antonio Ygnacio Avila, the rancho was later purchased by a Scottish baronet named Sir Robert Burnett in 1860. After his return to Scotland in 1873, the property was purchased by the then-manager of the rancho, Daniel Freeman. Freeman sold portions of the rancho to several persons. George H. Peck owned the 840 acres (340 ha) of land where the Chevron Refinery now sits. The city acquired its name ("the second" in Spanish) due to being the second Standard Oil refinery on the West Coast when Standard Oil of California purchased the 840 acres of land in 1911. Peck also developed land in neighboring El Porto, where a street still bears his name.

The city was incorporated in 1917. The Standard Oil Company was renamed Chevron in 1984. The El Segundo refinery entered its second century of operation in 2011.

The Douglas Aircraft Company plant in El Segundo was one of the major aircraft manufacturing facilities in California during World War II. It was one of the major producers of SBD Dauntless dive bombers, which achieved fame in the Battle of Midway. The facility, now operated by Northrop Grumman, is still an aircraft plant.

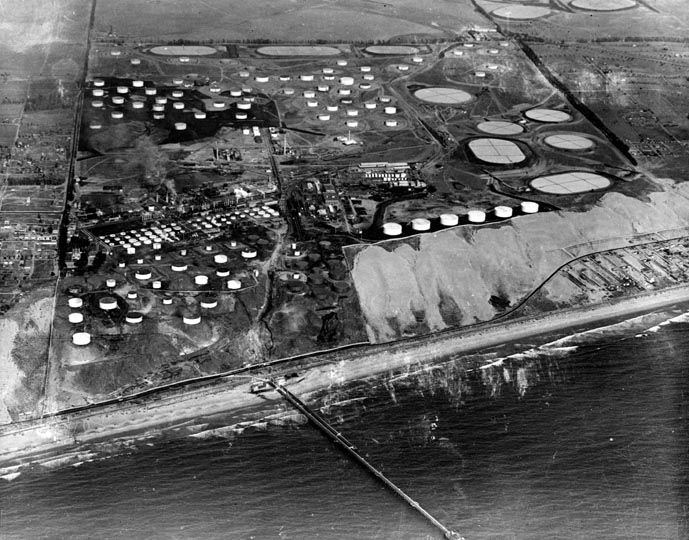
El Segundo and Standard Oil Refinery, c. 1920

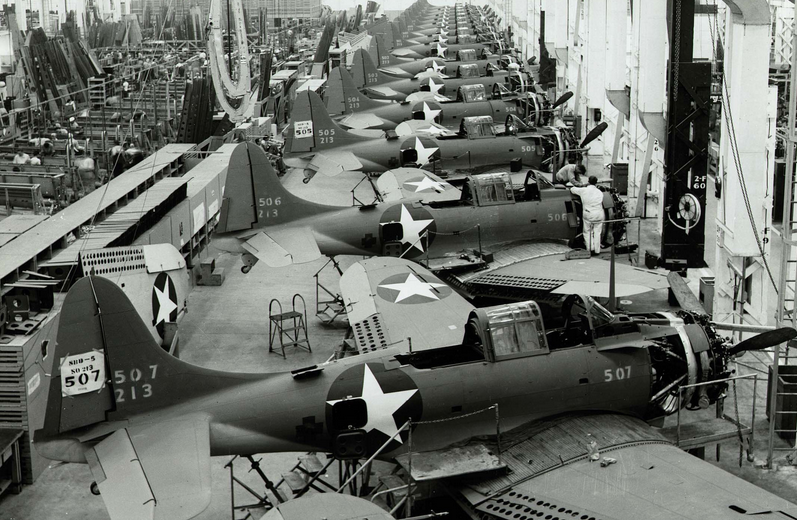
SBD Dauntless dive bombers being built by Douglas Aircraft Factory in El Segundo during World War II

In 2009, a pair of local artists discovered the Smoky Hollow area, which mainly consisted of commercial properties. Other artists started to migrate as they had been priced out of Venice Beach and Culver City. Not long after, the tech industry also discovered Smoky Hollow.

On the evening of October 2, 2025, an explosion occurred and a fire erupted at the Chevron refinery, which produces 276,000 barrels of crude oil daily.

== Geography ==
The northern and southern boundaries of the town are Los Angeles International Airport and Manhattan Beach, with the Pacific Ocean as the western boundary. Its eastern boundary is roughly marked by Aviation Blvd.

According to the United States Census Bureau, the city has a total area of 10.76 square miles (27.9 km^{2}), of which 5.46 square miles (14.1 km^{2}) is land and 5.3 square miles (14 km^{2}) is water.

The beachfront area neighboring the refinery was once dominated by industrial wharves servicing oil tanker ships, and heavily polluted by sewage and stormwater runoff. The major expansion of the Hyperion wastewater treatment plant in the 1980s was the impetus for rehabilitation of the beach. The old piers were demolished, an underwater oil terminal was constructed a few miles offshore, and an enormous amount of dredged sand was used to restore and dramatically enlarge the once narrow and polluted beach. The Marvin Braude Bike Trail runs along this new artificial beach, as the refinery wharves were one of the last remaining industrial facilities directly obstructing the shoreline of the Santa Monica Bay.

== Demographics ==
Historical population
Census	Pop.	Note	%±
1920	1,563		—
1930	3,503		124.1%
1940	3,738		6.7%
1950	8,011		114.3%
1960	14,219		77.5%
1970	15,620		9.9%
1980	13,752		−12.0%
1990	15,223		10.7%
2000	16,033		5.3%
2010	16,654		3.9%
2020	17,272		3.7%
U.S. Decennial Census; 1860–1870 1880-1890; 1900 1910 1920; 1930 1940 1950; 1960 1970 1980; 1990 2000 2010; 2020

El Segundo first appeared as a city in the 1920 U.S. census as part of the now defunct Redondo Township (pop. 5,016 in 1910).

=== Racial and ethnic composition ===
El Segundo city, California – Racial and ethnic composition Note: the US Census treats Hispanic/Latino as an ethnic category. This table excludes Latinos from the racial categories and assigns them to a separate category. Hispanics/Latinos may be of any race.
Race / Ethnicity (NH = Non-Hispanic)	Pop 1980	Pop 1990	Pop 2000	Pop 2010	Pop 2020	% 1980	% 1990	% 2000	% 2010	% 2020
White alone (NH)	12,308	12,897	12,356	11,515	10,626	89.50%	84.72%	77.07%	69.14%	61.58%
Black or African American alone (NH)	64	133	181	321	394	0.47%	0.87%	1.13%	1.93%	2.28%
Native American or Alaska Native alone (NH)	36	59	52	40	45	0.26%	0.39%	0.32%	0.24%	0.26%
Asian alone (NH)	241	733	1,005	1,427	1,804	1/75%	4.82%	6.27%	8.57%	10.44%
Native Hawaiian or Pacific Islander alone (NH)	241	733	47	30	61	1/75%	4.82%	0.29%	0.18%	0.35%
Other race alone (NH)	21	19	87	56	88	0.15%	0.12%	0.54%	0.34%	0.51%
Mixed race or Multiracial (NH)	x	x	540	656	1,268	x	x	3.37%	3.94%	7.34%
Hispanic or Latino (any race)	1,082	1,382	1,765	2,609	2,976	7.87%	9.08%	11.01%	15.67%	17.23%
Total	13.752	15,223	16,033	16,654	17,272	100.00%	100.00%	100.00%	100.00%	100.00%

=== 2020 census ===
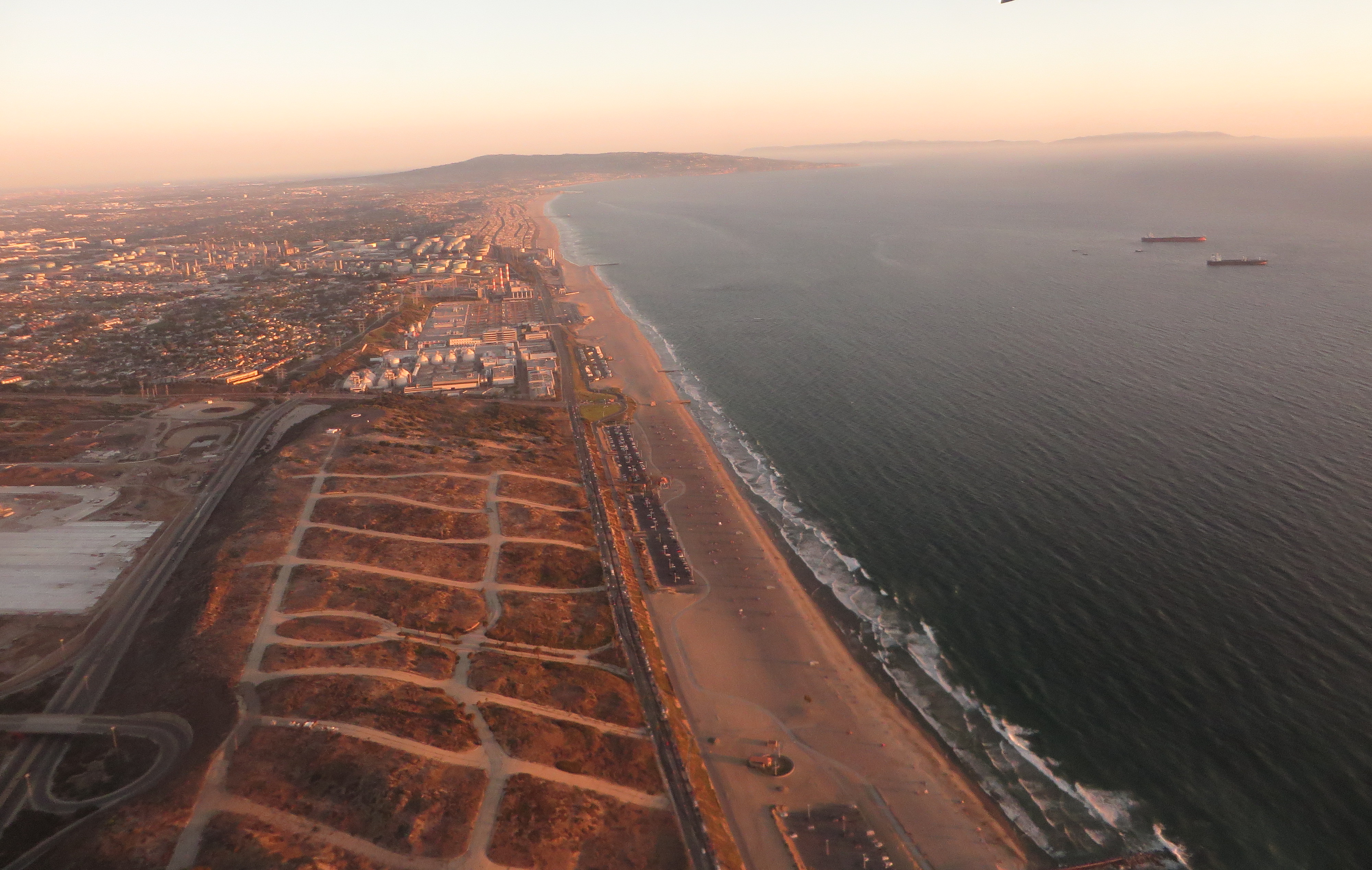
Palisades del Rey in foreground, with El Segundo in background

As of the 2020 census, El Segundo had a population of 17,272. The population density was 3,161.6 inhabitants per square mile (1,220.7/km^{2}). The age distribution was 20.6% under the age of 18, 7.6% aged 18 to 24, 30.7% aged 25 to 44, 28.2% aged 45 to 64, and 12.9% aged 65 or older. The median age was 39.0 years. For every 100 females, there were 99.6 males, and for every 100 females age 18 and over there were 98.6 males age 18 and over.

The census reported that 99.7% of the population lived in households, 0.1% lived in non-institutionalized group quarters, and 0.1% were institutionalized. 100.0% of residents lived in urban areas, while 0.0% lived in rural areas.

There were 7,175 households, of which 30.7% had children under the age of 18 living in them. Of all households, 45.2% were married-couple households, 7.0% were cohabiting couple households, 21.4% had a male householder with no spouse or partner present, and 26.3% had a female householder with no spouse or partner present. About 29.6% of all households were made up of individuals and 9.1% had someone living alone who was 65 years of age or older. The average household size was 2.4. There were 4,351 families (60.6% of all households).

There were 7,500 housing units at an average density of 1,372.9 units per square mile (530.1 units/km^{2}), of which 7,175 (95.7%) were occupied. Of occupied units, 42.5% were owner-occupied and 57.5% were renter-occupied. The housing vacancy rate was 4.3%, including a homeowner vacancy rate of 0.9% and a rental vacancy rate of 2.9%.

=== 2010 census ===
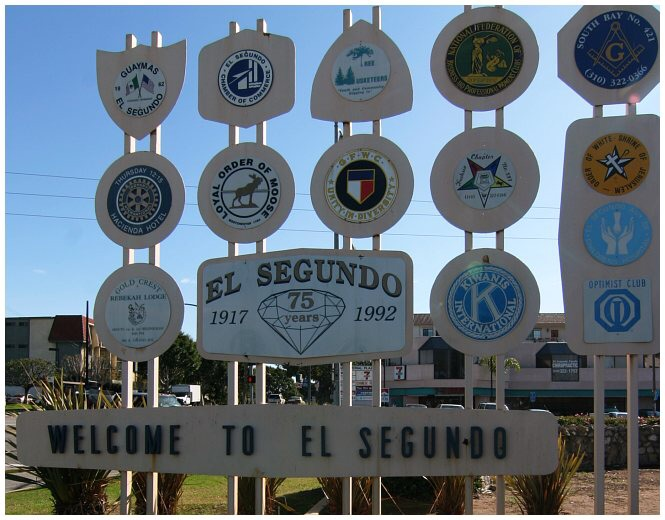
El Segundo's original welcome sign, replaced in 2024

The 2010 United States census reported that El Segundo had a population of 16,654. The population density was 3,047.9 inhabitants per square mile (1,176.8/km^{2}). The racial makeup of El Segundo was 12,997 (78.0%) White (69.1% non-Hispanic White), 337 (2.0%) African American, 68 (0.4%) Native American, 1,458 (8.8%) Asian, 38 (0.2%) Pacific Islander, 799 (4.8%) from other races, and 957 (5.7%) from two or more races. There were 2,609 people of Hispanic or Latino origin, of any race (15.7%).

The Census reported that 16,578 people (99.5% of the population) lived in households, 66 (0.4%) lived in non-institutionalized group quarters, and 10 (0.1%) were institutionalized.

Of the 7,085 households, 2,183 (30.8%) had children under the age of 18 living in them, 3,050 (43.0%) were married couples living together, 729 (10.3%) had a female householder with no husband present, 326 (4.6%) had a male householder with no wife present; and 369 (5.2%) were unmarried opposite-sex partnerships. About 31.8% were made up of individuals, and 8.0% had someone living alone who was 65 years of age or older. The average household size was 2.34. The city had 4,105 families (57.9% of all households); the average family size was 3.02.

22.3% of the population was under the age of 18, 6.7% was 18 to 24, 31.1% was 25 to 44, 29.8% was 45 to 64, and 10.1%o was 65 or older. The median age was 39.2. For every 100 females, there were 99.4 males. For every 100 females 18 and over, there were 98.8 males.

The 7,410 housing units had an average density of 1,356.1 units per square mile (523.6 units/km^{2}), of which 3,034 (42.8%) were owner-occupied and 4,051 (57.2%) occupied by renters. The homeowner vacancy rate was 0.4%; the rental vacancy rate was 4.1%. About 49.1% of the population lived in owner-occupied housing units and 50.4% in rental housing units.

According to the 2010 United States census, El Segundo had a median household income of $84,341, with 4.8% of the population living below the federal poverty line.

=== 2023 ACS 5-year estimates ===
In 2023, the US Census Bureau estimated that the median household income was $149,149, and the per capita income was $80,399. About 2.8% of families and 4.4% of the population were below the poverty line.

== Economy ==
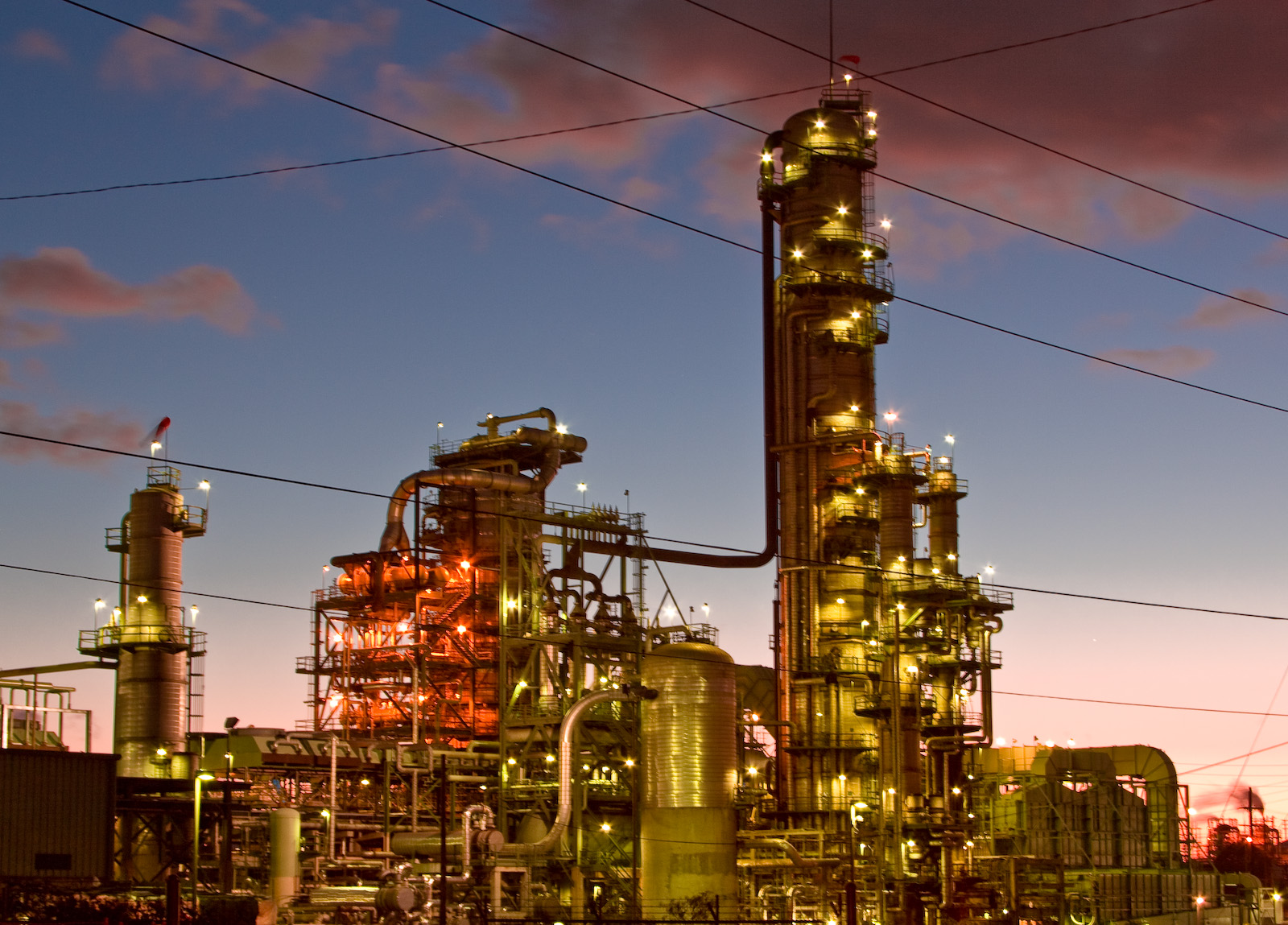
Chevron's El Segundo refinery in 2007

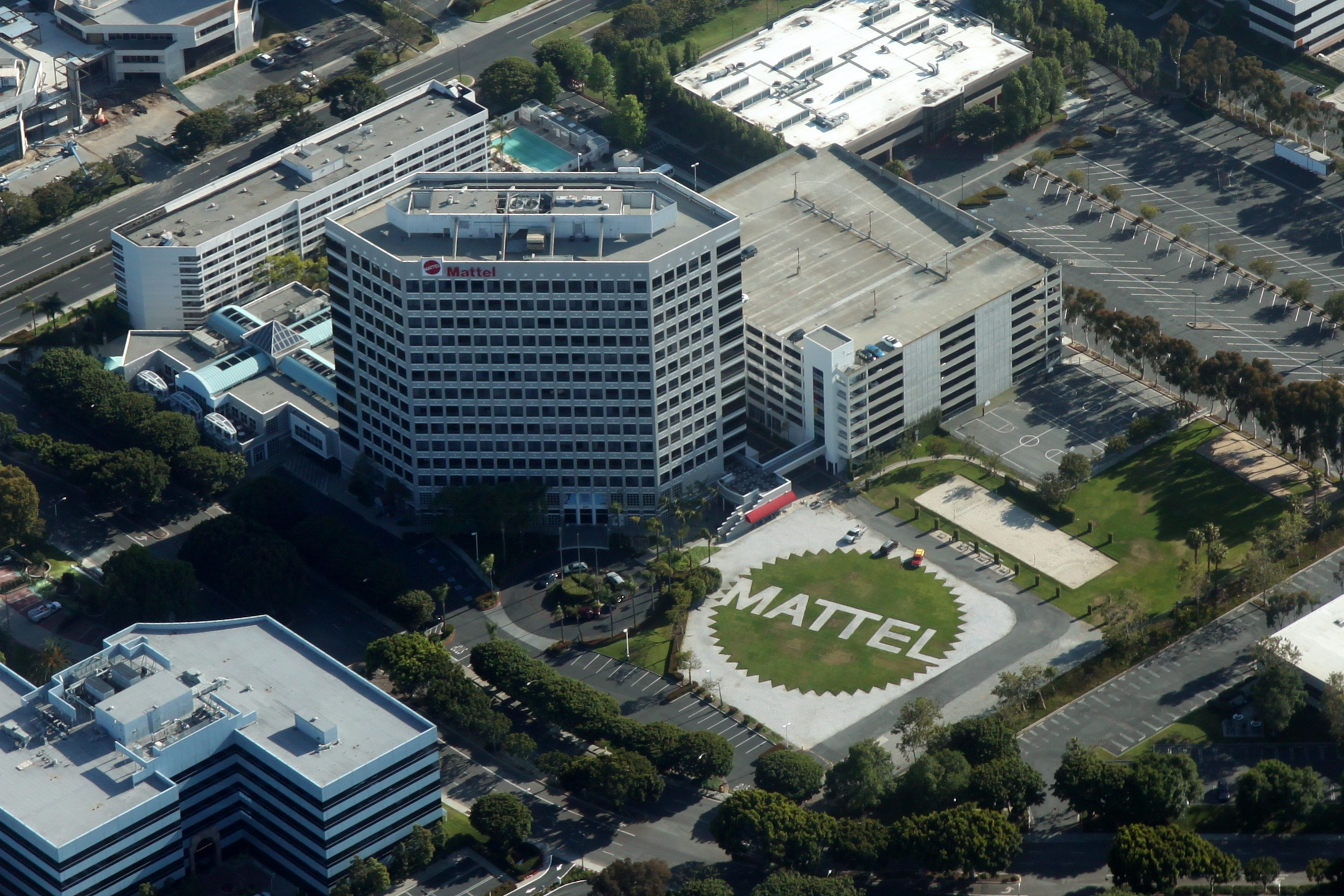
Headquarters of Mattel

=== Oil ===
The name was adopted in 1911 when Chevron built its second refinery, El Segundo, which is Spanish for "the Second". This refinery has received crude oil from the Amazon region of South America – more than 5,000 barrels per day. El Segundo is located next to the Hyperion sewage treatment plant and the El Segundo power plant. The El Segundo power plant is operated by the American energy company NRG. NRG was to create a new combined cycle power island, providing power for 240,000 households. The power plant, which came online in 2013, uses two generators: a Siemens gas turbine and an additional steam turbine. Prior to its dissolution, Unocal was headquartered in El Segundo.

=== Aerospace ===
In 1928, William Mines, an immigrant from Canada, leased land for a flying field. In 1930, Los Angeles Municipal Airport, later Los Angeles International Airport, opened north of El Segundo; its presence led to the concentration of aerospace and aviation-related firms in the El Segundo area. Many large aerospace companies have facilities in El Segundo, including the four largest aerospace companies in the US: Boeing, RTX Corporation, Lockheed Martin and Northrop Grumman; many smaller aerospace companies such as Wyle Laboratories and The Aerospace Corporation all have facilities in El Segundo. It is also home to the Los Angeles Air Force Base and the Space and Missile Systems Center, which is responsible for space-related acquisition for the military.

The current Boeing factory, the Boeing Satellite Development Center, was originally built by Nash Motors in 1946 and opened in 1948. In 1955, Hughes Aircraft Company purchased the 500,000-square-foot (46,000 m^{2}) building; it was converted to build missiles and also served as a test facility. At one time, MGM Grand Air had its headquarters in El Segundo.

=== "Gundo" and hard-tech resurgence ===
Aerospace manufacturing declined in the 1990s due to industry consolidation and offshoring. In the 21st century, the city has experienced a resurgence as a hub for hardware innovation and "hard-tech" startups, referred to as "Gundo" by locals and in the industry. The establishment of SpaceX in the city in 2002 helped trigger this revitalization. Former SpaceX employees have since founded numerous startups in the area, using the city's legacy of machine shops and industrial zoning.

The modern industrial ecosystem in El Segundo is characterized by a focus on "atoms" (hardware) rather than "bits" (software), and many of its startups aim to compete with Chinese manufacturing dominance in sectors such as defense, energy, and aerospace. Notable companies operating in the city's Smoky Hollow district include Varda Space Industries (space manufacturing), Neros (drone manufacturing), and General Matter (uranium enrichment). This concentration of defense-tech and high-precision manufacturing has attracted significant investment from venture capital firms, including Andreessen Horowitz and Founders Fund, establishing El Segundo as a hardware-focused counterpart to the software-centric culture of Silicon Valley.

=== Other industries ===
Toy manufacturer Mattel, AT&T Entertainment Hub (formerly DirecTV), and A-Mark Precious Metals are headquartered there, as well as sporting goods retailer Big 5 Sporting Goods and Stamps.com. Database company Teradata has a research and development facility in El Segundo, as well.

From 1982 until 1996, the headquarters of the Los Angeles Raiders of the National Football League was located in El Segundo. The headquarters of the Los Angeles Kings of the National Hockey League is also located in El Segundo. In 2024, the Los Angeles Chargers moved their headquarters and practice facility to El Segundo from Costa Mesa. The Los Angeles Lakers office headquarters and practice facility, the UCLA Health Training Center are also located in El Segundo. Their NBA G-League affiliate the South Bay Lakers played their games there from 2017 to 2026. The Los Angeles Sparks are planning to build a new training facility in El Segundo.

Film production companies are located in El Segundo, including Rhythm and Hues Studios and Lightstorm Entertainment. Human resources software company Neogov was founded in El Segundo in 2012.

The Los Angeles Times moved its newsroom from downtown Los Angeles to a 4.5-acre (18,000 m^{2}) campus in El Segundo in 2018.

On the eastern side of town located next to the Los Angeles Air Force Base (LAAFB) is L'Oreal USA's second headquarters In addition to Beyond Meat's headquarters just to the north

=== Top employers ===
According to the city's 2020–21 Comprehensive Annual Financial Report, the top employers in the city are:

#	Employer	# of Employees
1	Boeing	12,005
2	Raytheon Technologies	6,000
3	Northrop Grumman	2,422
4	The Aerospace Corporation	2,180
5	Mattel	1,545
6	Chevron	1,187
7	Internet Brands	661
8	Infineon Technologies	498
9	Karl Storz Endoscopy America Inc.	421
10	Big 5 Sporting Goods	290

=== Subsidiaries of companies ===
Nexon America, the North American branch of Korean online game publisher Nexon Co. Ltd. has its offices in El Segundo.

The North American branch of the Japanese video game publisher and developer Square Enix has its headquarters in El Segundo.

The Hong Kong–based toy manufacturer Playmates Toys has its U.S. headquarters in El Segundo.

Due to its proximity to Los Angeles International Airport, El Segundo became the host of several offices of airlines. In 1979, the United Airlines Reservation Center, a two-story, $4.5 million, 55,000-square-foot (5,100 m^{2}) facility in the International Center, was scheduled to begin construction. Austin Co., a firm in Irvine, was to build the facility, which was scheduled for opening in May of that year. Japan Airlines operates its United States headquarters, which was moved from New York City to El Segundo in around 2003. at Suite 620 of 300 Continental Boulevard; Cathay Pacific has an office in El Segundo. The airline moved its North America headquarters to Greater Los Angeles in 1990, and the headquarters were situated in El Segundo until 2005.

Air China operates its North American headquarters in the 13,000-square-foot (1,200 m^{2}) 2131 East Maple Avenue building, south of LAX, in El Segundo. Its current North American headquarters opened with a ribbon cutting ceremony and other festivities on Friday March 26, 2010. The call center reservations, marketing, and sales employees all moved into the building. The building includes a call center with space for 50 employees; when the building opened, half of the spaces had been filled.

Air New Zealand operates its United States headquarters in El Segundo. Other airlines with offices in El Segundo include Turkish Airlines, Thai Airways, Air Tahiti Nui, Aeroméxico, China Airlines Emirates, EVA Air, and Singapore Airlines.

Infineon Technologies acquired El Segundo-based company International Rectifier in 2015.

== Parks and recreation ==
Main Street in El Segundo

El Segundo has its own beach, as well as two public pools; both are outdoor pools, one of which is open only during the summer months. The El Segundo Parks and Recreation staff are the basis for the hit NBC program Parks and Recreation. El Segundo has two full-sized turf fields named Campus El Segundo Athletic Fields, which are open to the public.

=== Athletics ===
In 2023, El Segundo Little League won the world championship of the Little League World Series, defeating the team from Willemstad, Curaçao in the championship. Louis Lappe hit a walk-off home run to win the game, 6–5. It was the first championship for a team from California since 2011.

=== Theatre and film ===
EL Segundo is home to Old Town Music Hall, a 501(c)(3) non-profit organization dedicated to concerts, films from Hollywood's Golden Age, and silent films, accompanied by a Mighty Wurlitzer organ.

== Government ==
=== Local government ===
According to the city's most recent Comprehensive Annual Financial Report, its various funds had $99.0 million in revenues, $91.0 million in expenditures, $206.5 million in total assets, $33.6 million in total liabilities, and $50.4 million in cash and investments.

In the Los Angeles County Board of Supervisors, El Segundo is in the Second District, represented by Holly Mitchell.

=== State and federal representation ===
In the California State Legislature, El Segundo is in the 24th senatorial district, represented by Democrat Ben Allen, and in the 66th Assembly district, represented by Democrat Al Muratsuchi.

In the United States House of Representatives, El Segundo is in California's 36th congressional district, represented by Democrat Ted Lieu.

== Education ==
El Segundo High School

The El Segundo Unified School District serves the residential district of El Segundo, west of Pacific Coast Highway. It operates El Segundo High School.

Eastern El Segundo is part of the tax base for the Wiseburn Unified School District, and formerly for the Centinela Valley Union High School District (CVUHSD). There are no residential areas in the eastern part of the city. This portion of the city includes corporate operations providing significant tax revenue to the district (formerly districts).

Vistamar School is a private school in El Segundo.

Originally all of the city was located in the Wiseburn School District, which opened in 1896. When the Inglewood Union High School District, now known as the CVUHSD, opened in 1905, its territory included the Wiseburn district. In 1912 the El Segundo School District opened, taking territory from the Wiseburn School District. The territory of the El Segundo district continued to be in the Inglewood Union District. On November 22, 1925, the El Segundo High School District was formed and El Segundo withdrew from the Inglewood Union district.

== Media ==
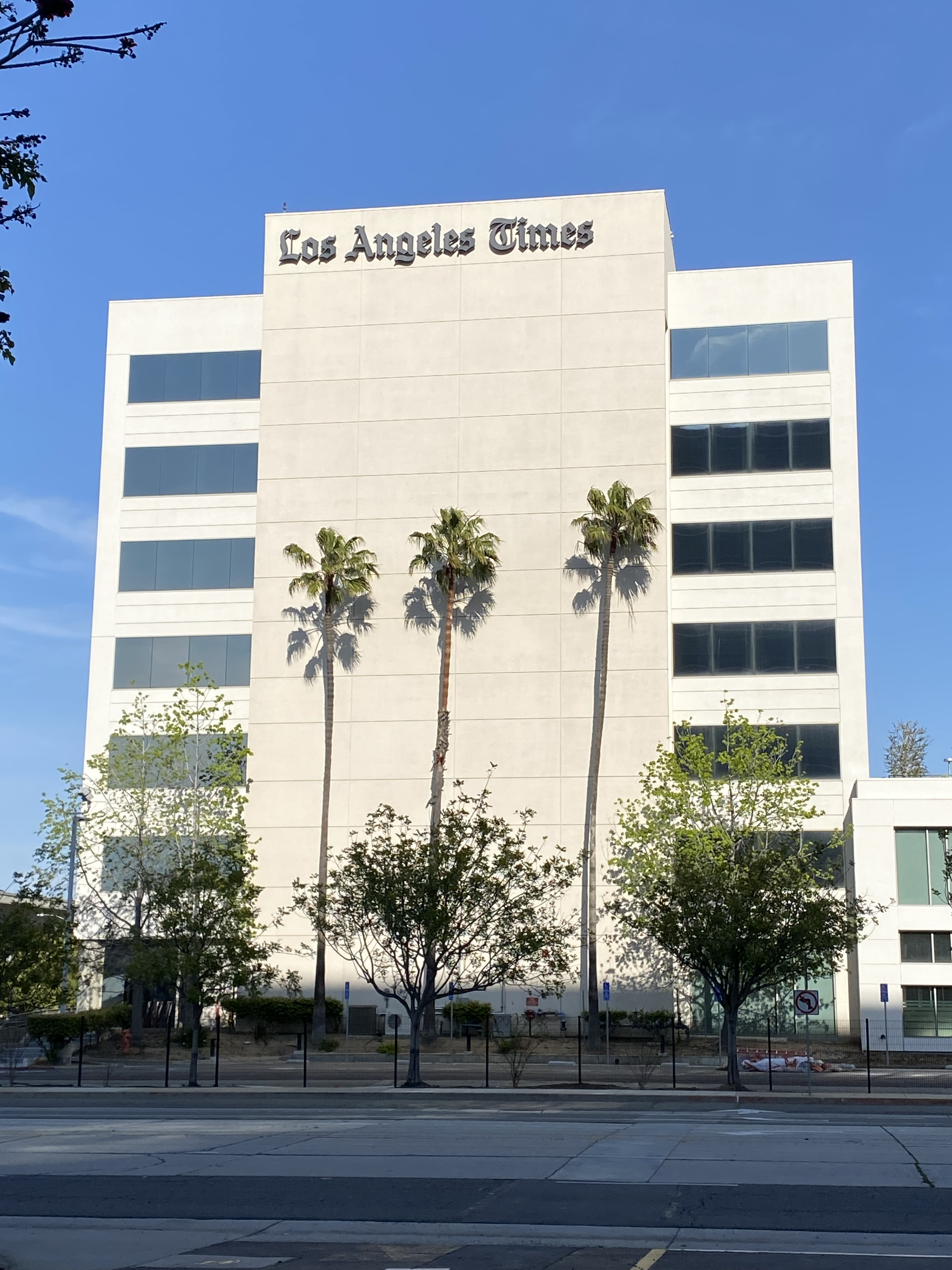
Los Angeles Times headquarters

The Los Angeles Times has been headquartered in El Segundo since 2018. The local Charter Spectrum news and sports channels, Spectrum News 1, Spectrum SportsNet, and SportsNet LA are based out of El Segundo.

The El Segundo Herald is the community newspaper for El Segundo. It was established in 1911, six years before the city was incorporated. It had its centennial anniversary of service to the community in 2011.

A monthly arts and culture publication, The El Segundo Scene, began printing in May 2018. Created and run by two El Segundo residents, the magazine serves El Segundo and its neighbors in the South Bay.

== Infrastructure ==
=== Transportation ===
State Route 1 passes through the city as Pacific Coast Highway, while Interstate 105 begins its journey at Sepulveda Boulevard (the continuation of State Route 1 north of El Segundo city limits) just outside the northern city limits of El Segundo and heads east to Norwalk. The Los Angeles Metro K Line runs through the Eastern industrial and office district before meeting the C Line near Interstate 105 and Aviation Boulevard and continuing along north for the rest of its length.

Amtrak's El Segundo Bus Stop (ESG) is located at the Los Angeles Metro Rail's Douglas station and is serviced by Amtrak Thruway. The stop is on Amtrak's 1c bus route that runs four times a day between Amtrak's Torrance Bus Stop (Alpine Village) and the Bakersfield Amtrak station where passengers transfer to and from trains on Gold Runner services; passengers can also connect with Pacific Surfliner at the Van Nuys Amtrak station.

Los Angeles International Airport (LAX) is located immediately to the north of El Segundo. In 2014, an air quality study found harmful ultrafine particles from the takeoffs and landings at LAX to be of a much greater magnitude than previously thought.

== Notable people ==
- Roseanne Barr, comedian, owns Full Moon and High Tides Productions
- George Brett, baseball player, Hall of Fame
- Ken Brett, baseball player
- Joe Caravello, NFL football player
- Dick Dale, guitarist, pioneer of Surf music
- Rusty Frank, author, choreographer, producer, dance historian
- The Ghost Inside, metalcore band
- Mike Gordon, Assemblymember and mayor of El Segundo
- Carl Koppelman, accountant and forensic sketch artist
- Dave LaRoche, baseball pitcher
- Vladimir Matyushenko, UFC fighter
- Christopher McCandless, adventurer who inspired the book Into the Wild and the 2007 film The Call of the Wild
- Dave McCoy, skier and businessman, founder of Mammoth Mountain, was born in El Segundo
- Scott McGregor, baseball pitcher
- Lars Nootbaar, MLB baseball player for the St. Louis Cardinals
- Bob Samuelson, volleyball player
- John Van Hamersveld, artist and surfer
- Erik von Detten, former actor, singer
- Paul Westphal, basketball player and coach
- Dave Williamson, stand-up comedian

== In popular culture ==
- A Tribe Called Quest's single "I Left My Wallet In El Segundo" revolves around a stop through the town on the way back to Brooklyn.
- El Segundo is frequently referenced by Fred G. Sanford in the TV series Sanford and Son.
- Although filmed in British Columbia, the music video for the song "First Date", by pop-punk band Blink-182, takes place in El Segundo in 1974.
- The fictitious Silicon Valley company Pied Piper tapped the real-life, El Segundo-headquartered company Wpromote to develop its mascot, Pipey.
- The movie Candy Cane Lane, starring Eddie Murphy, takes place in El Segundo.
- The Netflix original film Family Switch is in part filmed in El Segundo, and features many scenes at El Segundo High School.

== See also ==
- Automobile Driving Museum - a museum in El Segundo.
