= Wpromote =

American digital marketing agency

- Company type: Private
- Industry: Digital marketing
- Founded: 2001
- Founder: Michael Mothner
- Headquarters: El Segundo, California, United States
- Website: www.wpromote.com

Wpromote is a United States–based digital marketing agency headquartered in El Segundo, California.

== History ==
Wpromote was founded in 2001 by Michael Mothner while he was a student at Dartmouth College. Early work focused on paid search before expanding into broader digital marketing services.

The company has grown both organically and through acquisitions in the United States, including:

- Standing Dog (2016), a Texas-based online marketing agency;
- Prime Visibility (2017), a New York–based digital marketing firm;
- DemandWave (2017), a San Francisco–area B2B agency;
- Growth Pilots (2019), a paid media agency in San Francisco;
- Metric Digital (2020), a performance marketing agency with DTC focus;
- Visiture (2021), an ecommerce-focused agency in the Southeast U.S.

In October 2022, private equity firm ZMC made a strategic investment in Wpromote. Financing partners later referenced the transaction in deal announcements.

== In popular culture ==
In 2016, Wpromote’s El Segundo office was used as a filming location for an episode of the HBO series Silicon Valley; trade press covered the cameo and related exposure.
