= Old Town Music Hall =

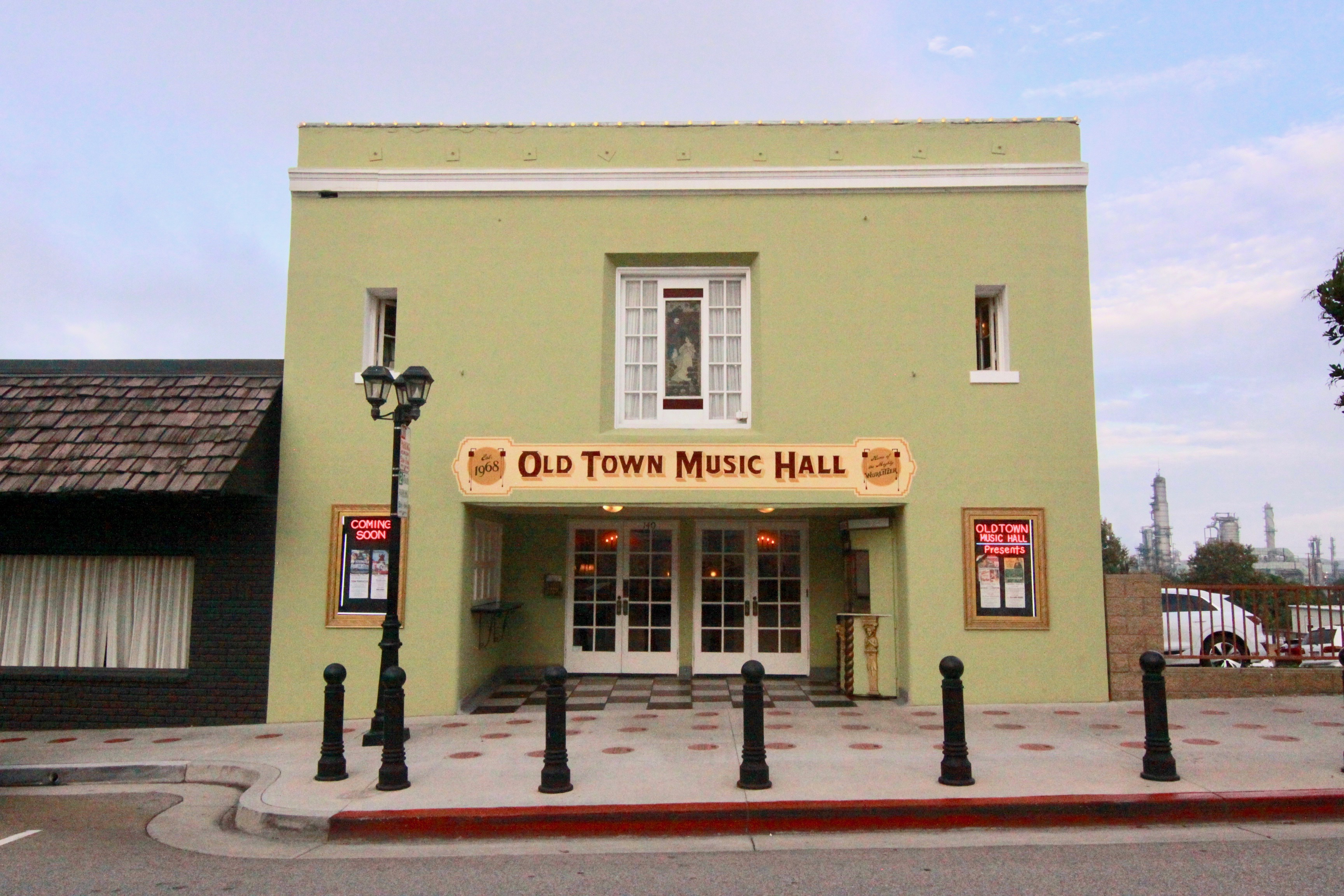
- Interactive map of Old Town Music Hall
- Former names: El Segundo State Theater, El Segundo Theatre
- Address: 140 Richmond St.
- Location: El Segundo, California
- Coordinates: 33°55′03″N 118°25′01″W
- Capacity: 176-188
- Type: Live theatre venue and film house

Construction
- Built: 1921
- Architect: Edward L. Mayberry Jr.

Website
- oldtownmusichall.org

Old Town Music Hall is a historic theatre located at 140 Richmond St., El Segundo, CA. It was founded in 1921.

== History ==
The theatre opened as El Segundo State Theater in 1921, a 188-seat venue that hosted live performances for the employees of the nearby Standard Oil Refinery. Many websites attribute the architect as Edward L. Mayberry Jr., but the building we see was not his design. He did list plans as drawn for the theater in Southwest Builder and Contractor (Vol 55, June 11, 1920, page 13). However a later entry (Southwest Builder and Contractor, Vol 56-57:1, December 10, 1920, page 235) suggests architects were John P. Krempel and Walter E. Erkes with offices at 538 Bradbury Building, The Mayberry plans were for a 500 seat two story theater while the Krempel/Erkes plans were for a smaller, one-story theater. The theatre was upgraded for motion picture viewing and continued to serve this purpose until the mid-1930s when it experienced a closure until 1944, reopening as the El Segundo Theatre. In 1957, the name State Theatre was restored and the venue remained active through the mid-1960s. At this juncture, two musicians, Bill Coffman and Bill Field, purchased a 2,600-pipe Mighty Wurlitzer organ from the Fox West Theater in Long Beach, CA, and found a home for it at the State. They reopened the State as Old Town Music Hall in November 1968, specializing in concerts, films from Hollywood’s Golden Age, and silent films, accompanied by the organ. Since 1990, the theater has operated as a 501(c)(3) non-profit organization.

== Gallery ==
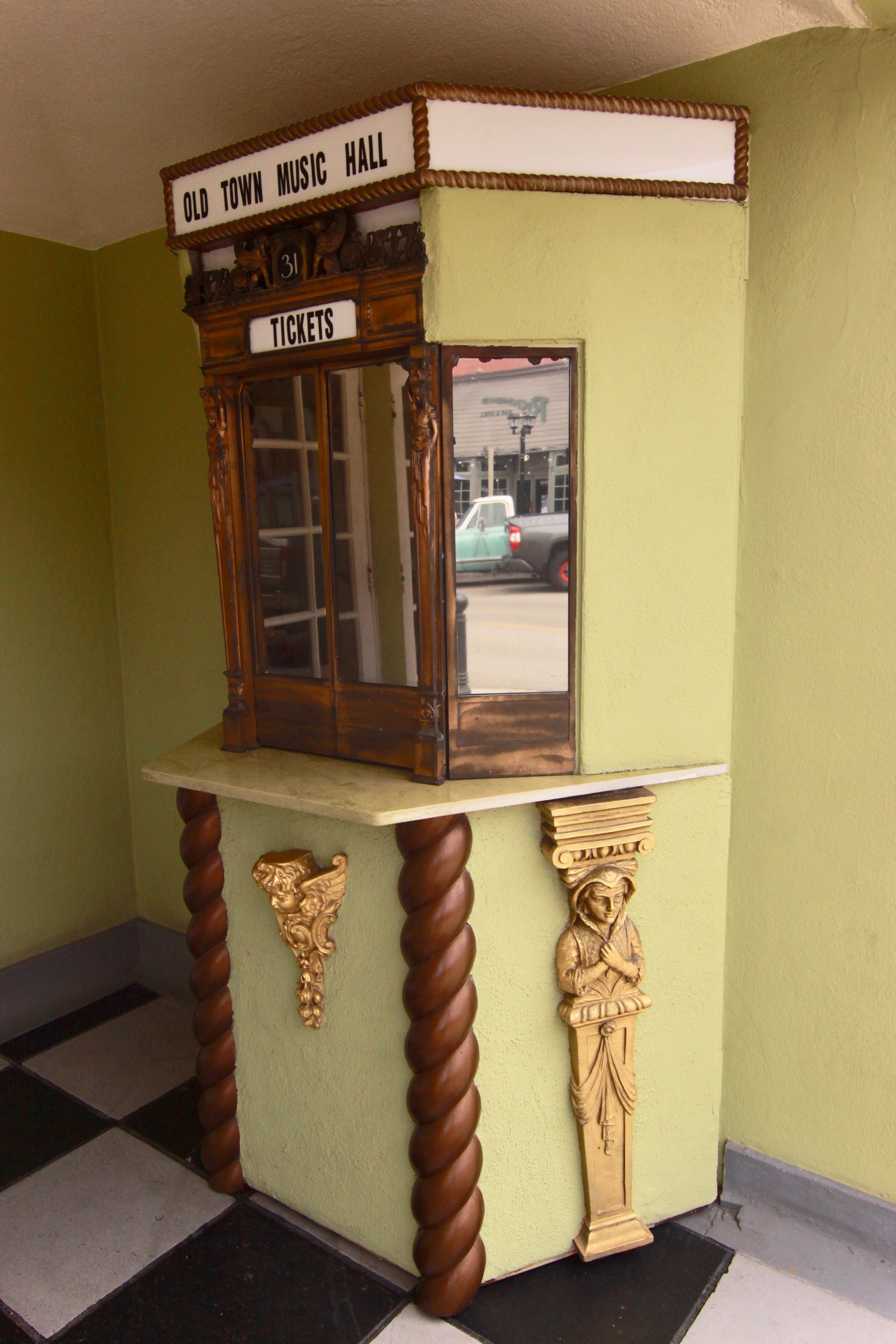

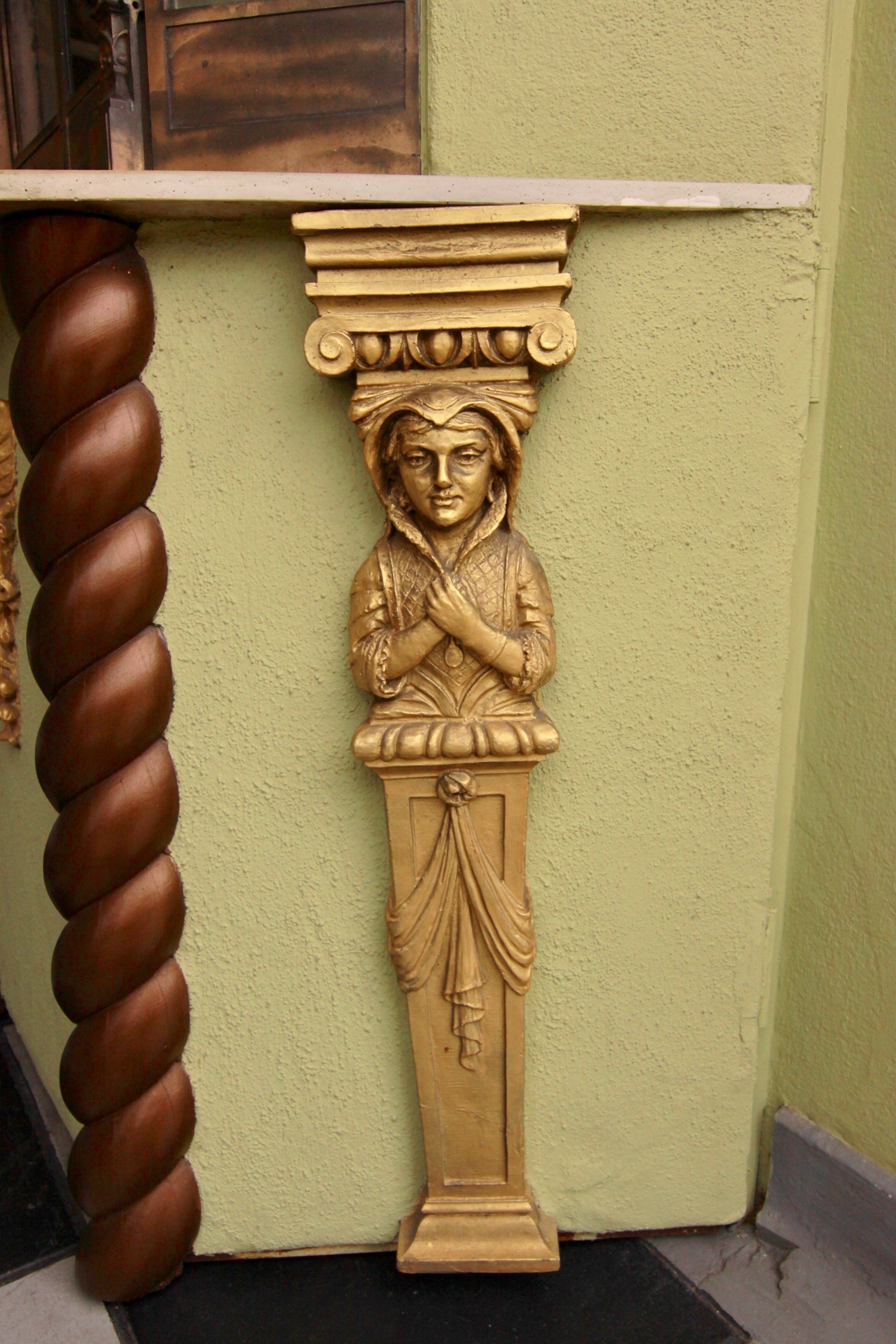

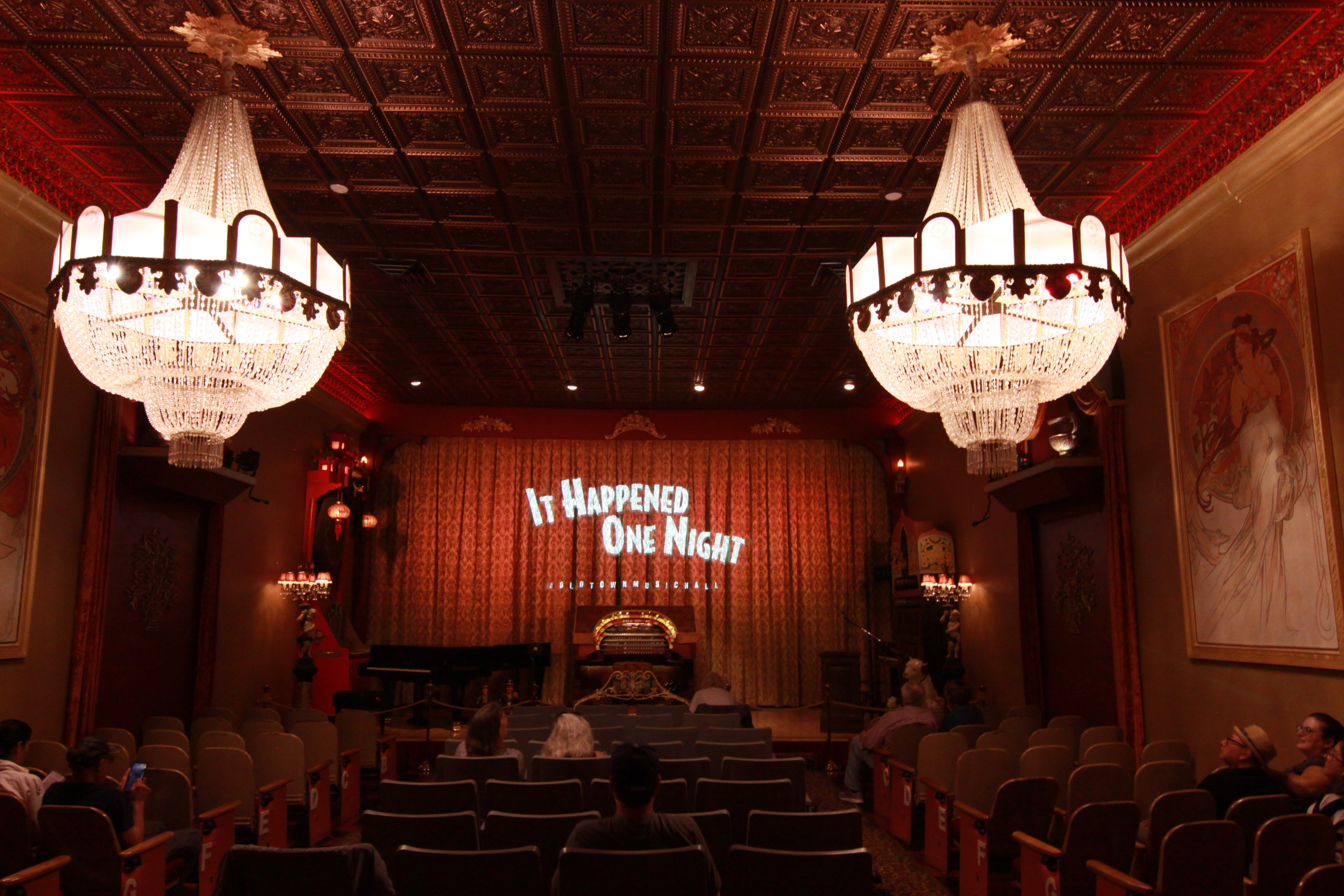

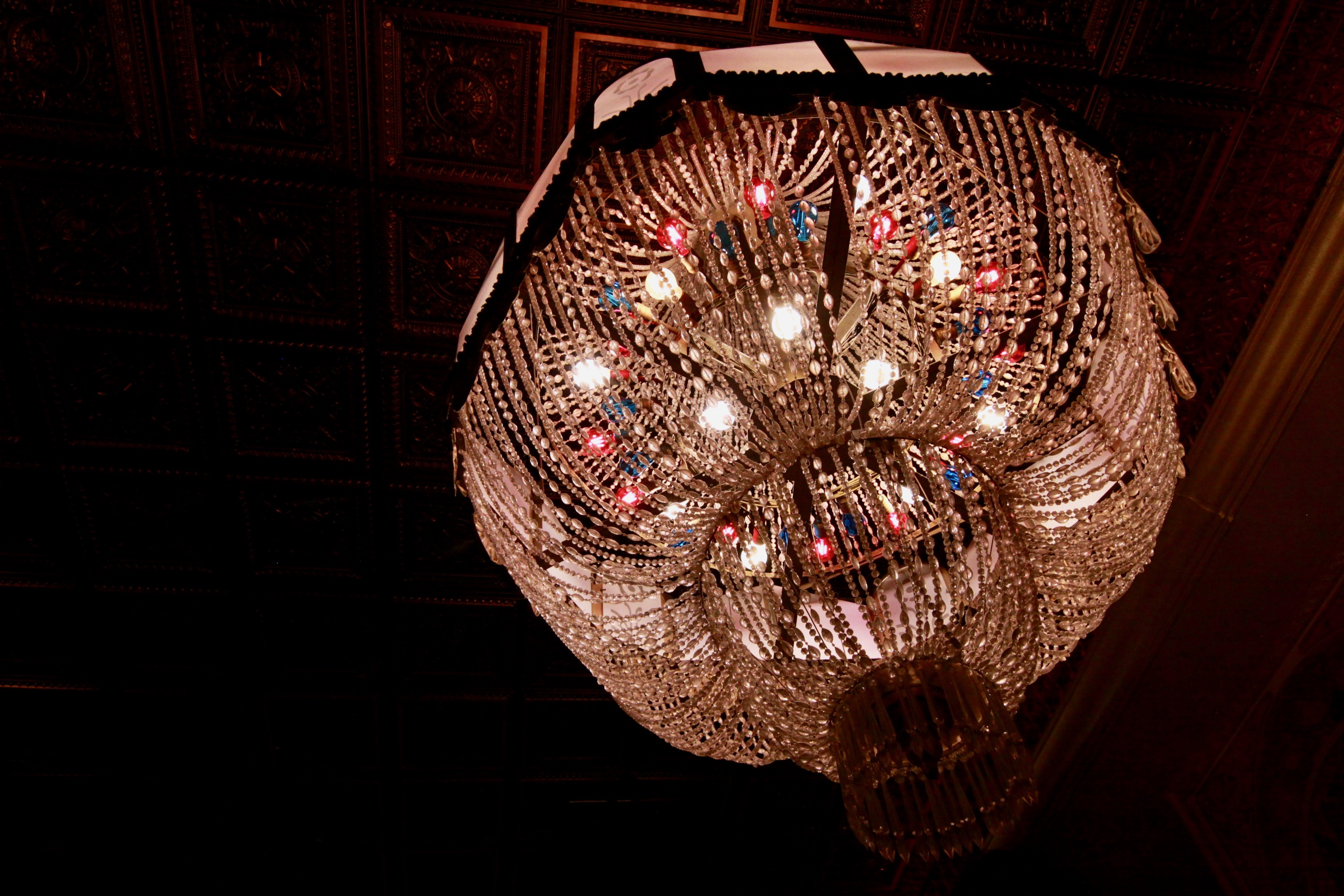

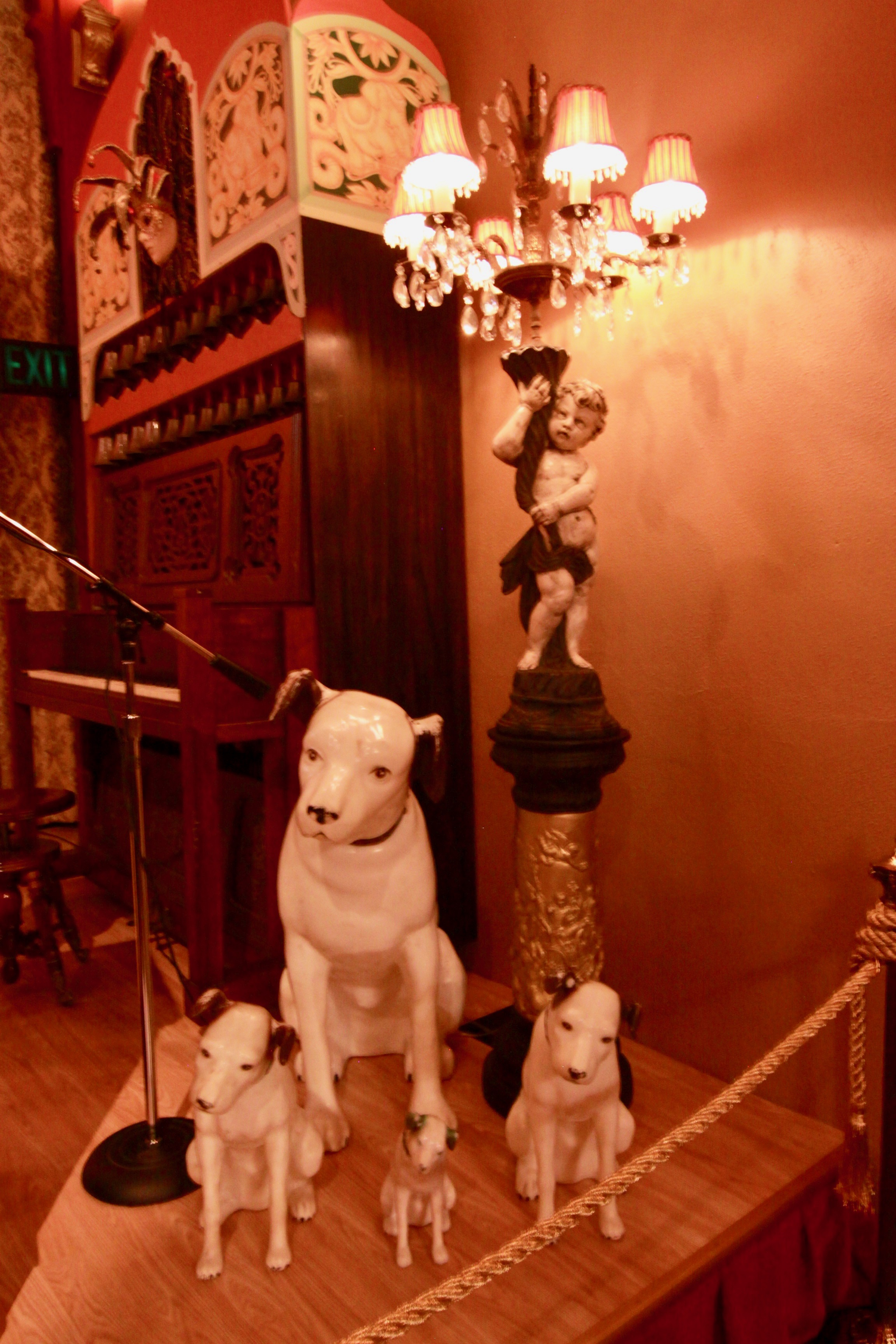

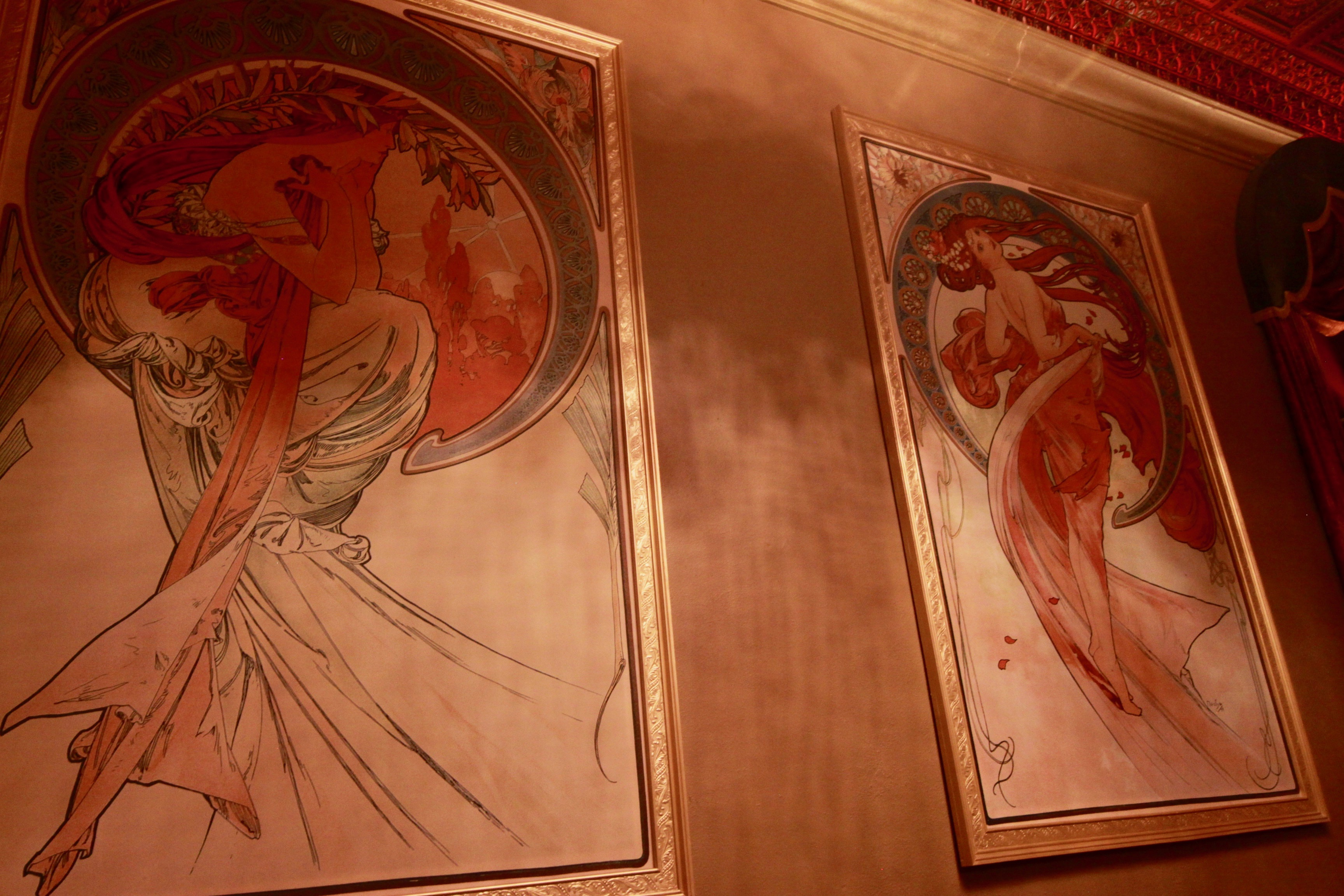

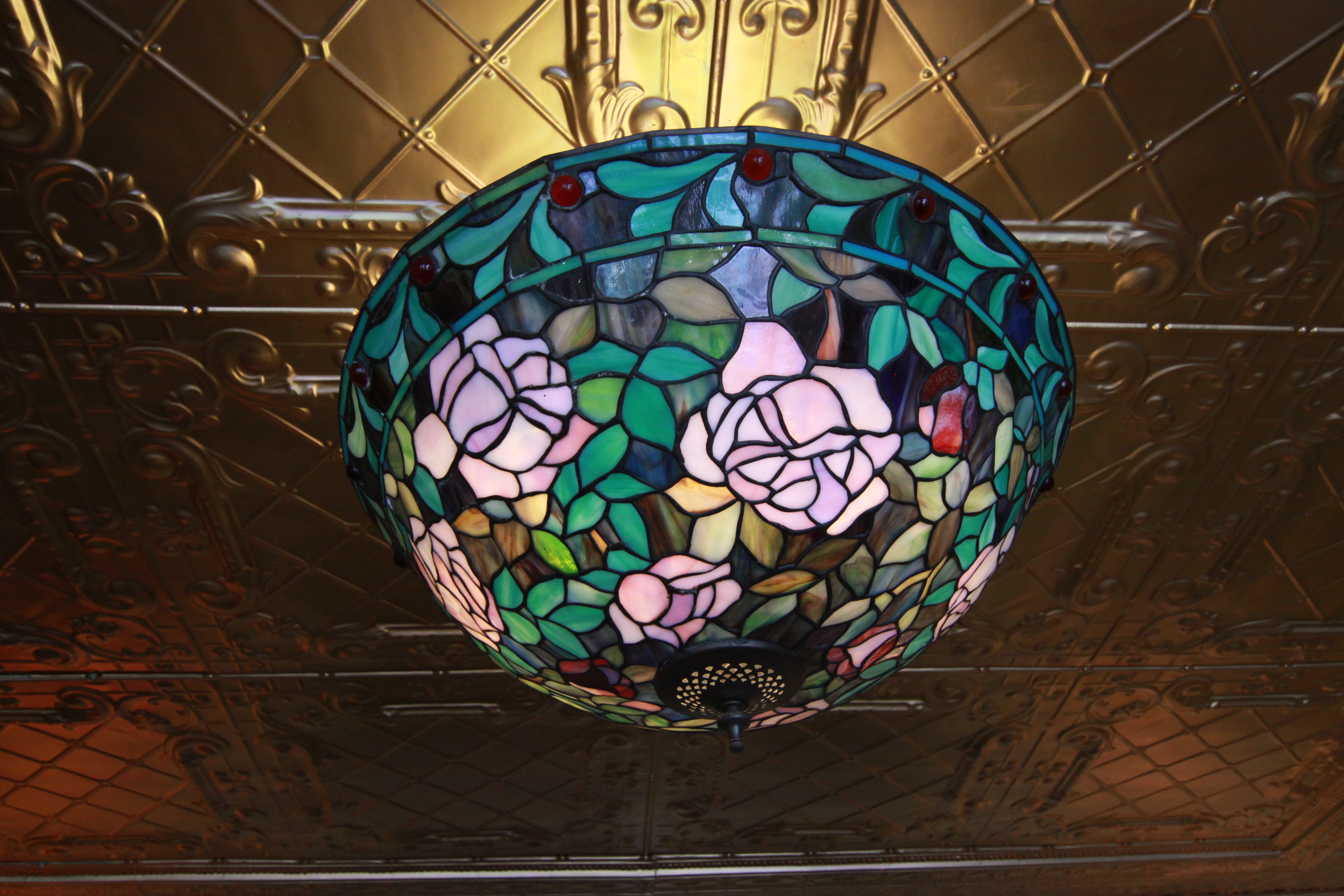

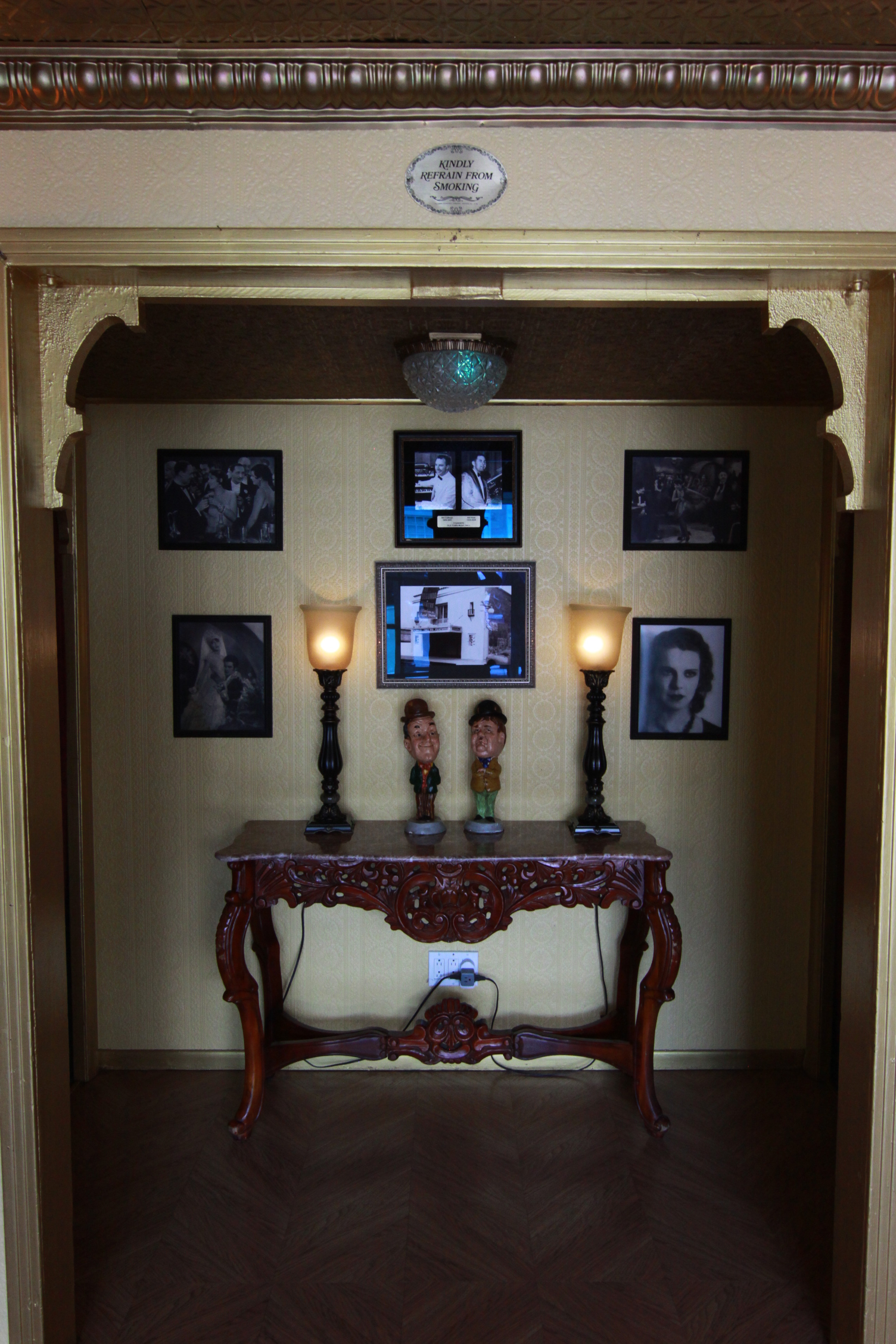

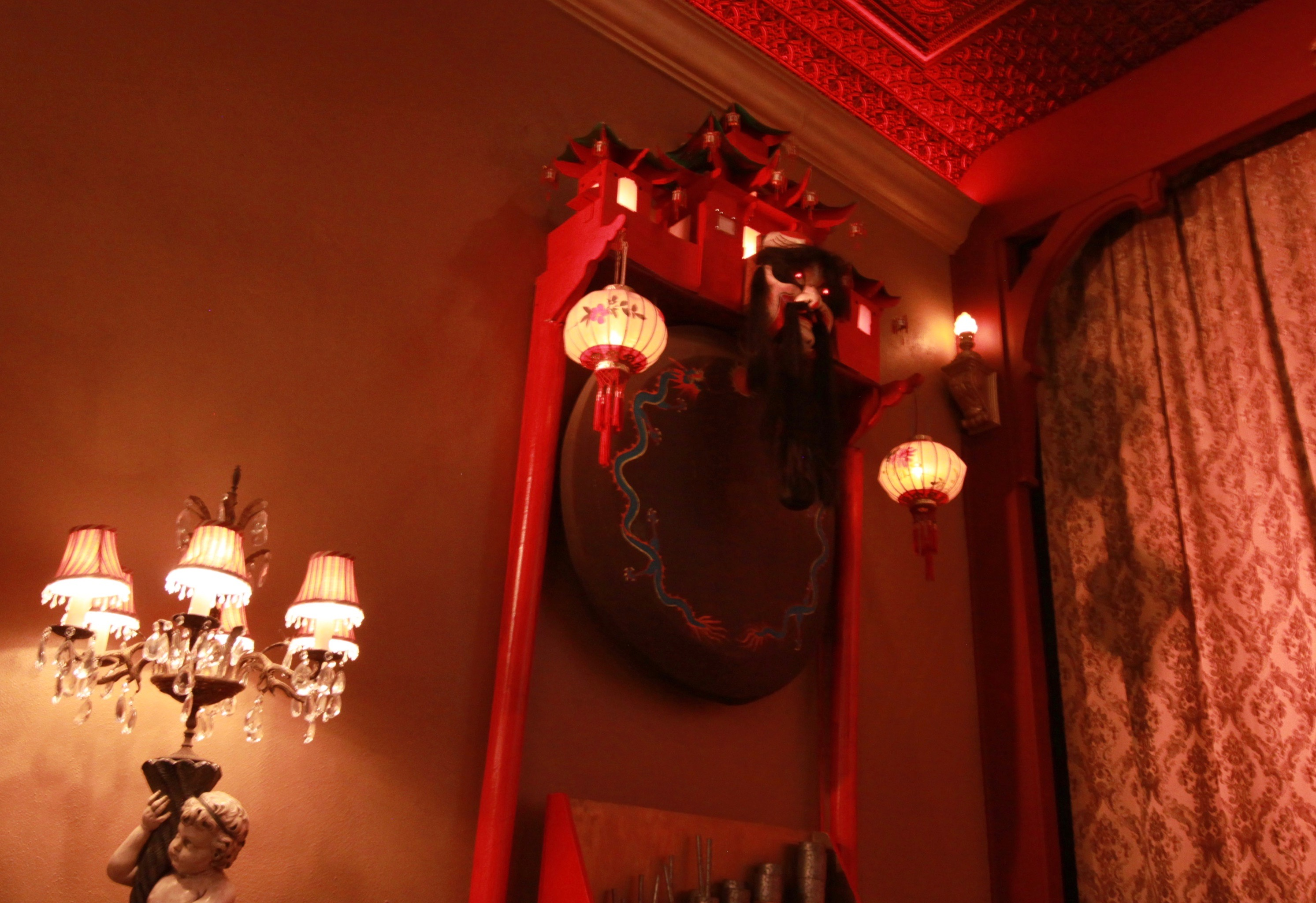

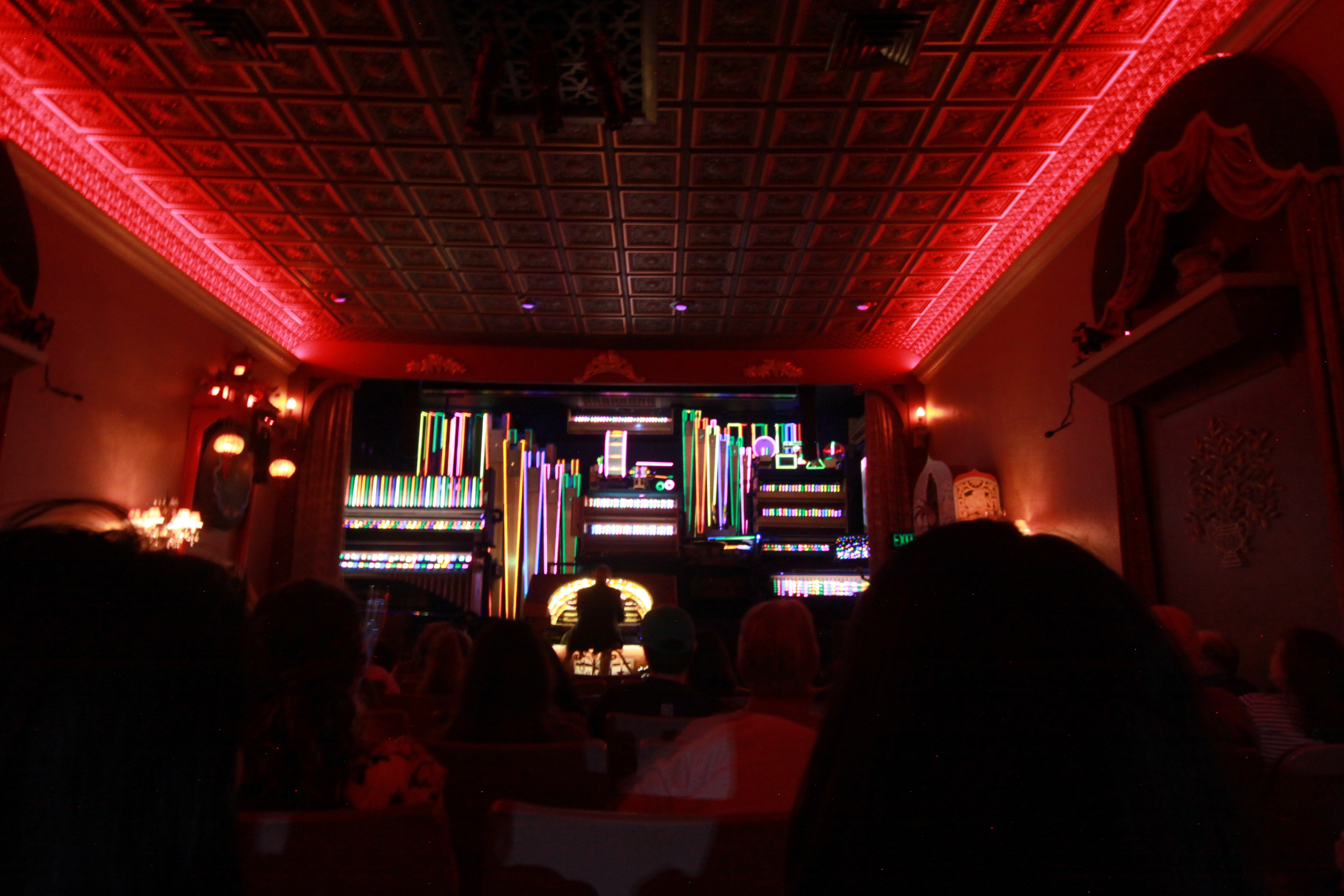

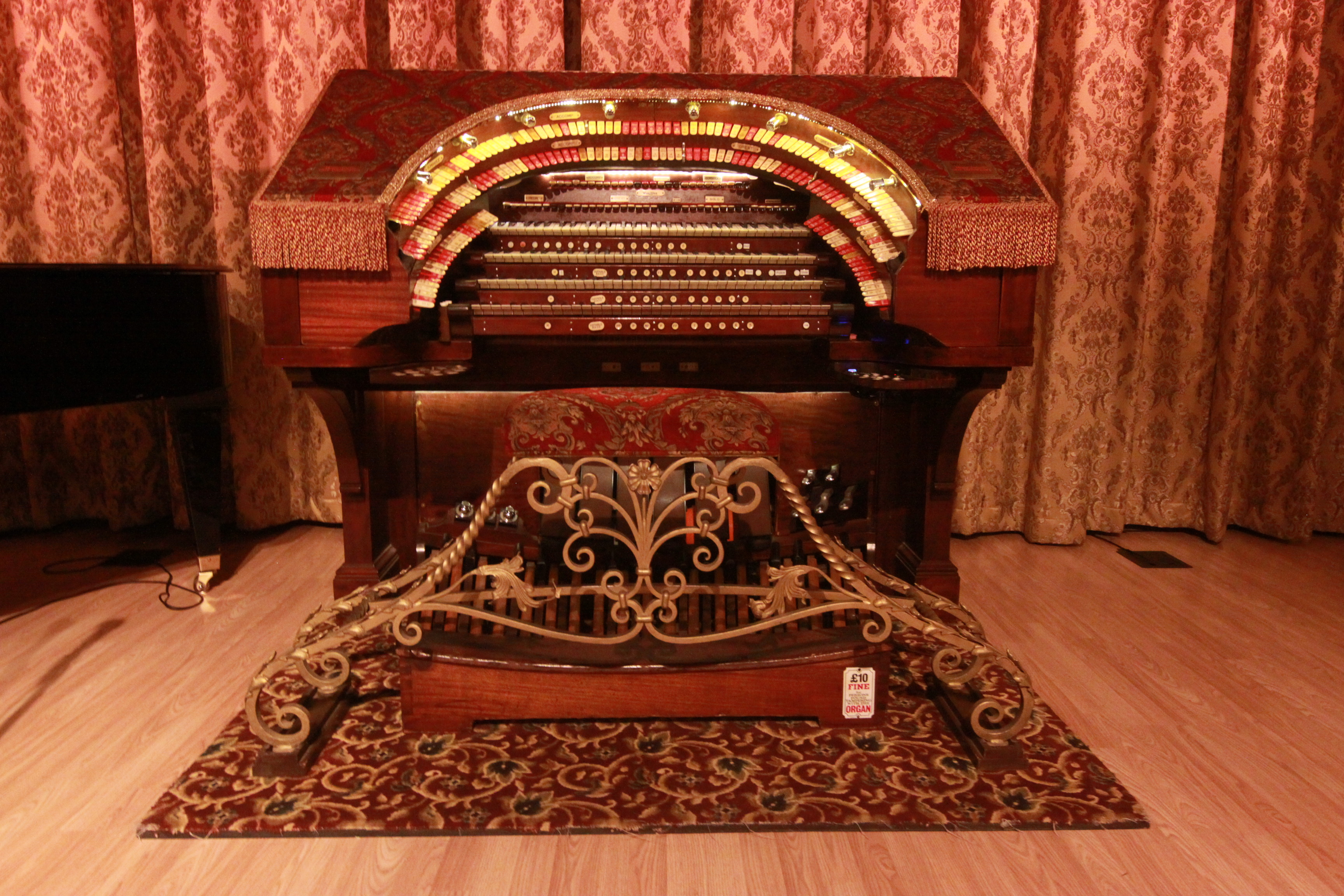
