= List of Los Angeles Metro Busway stations =

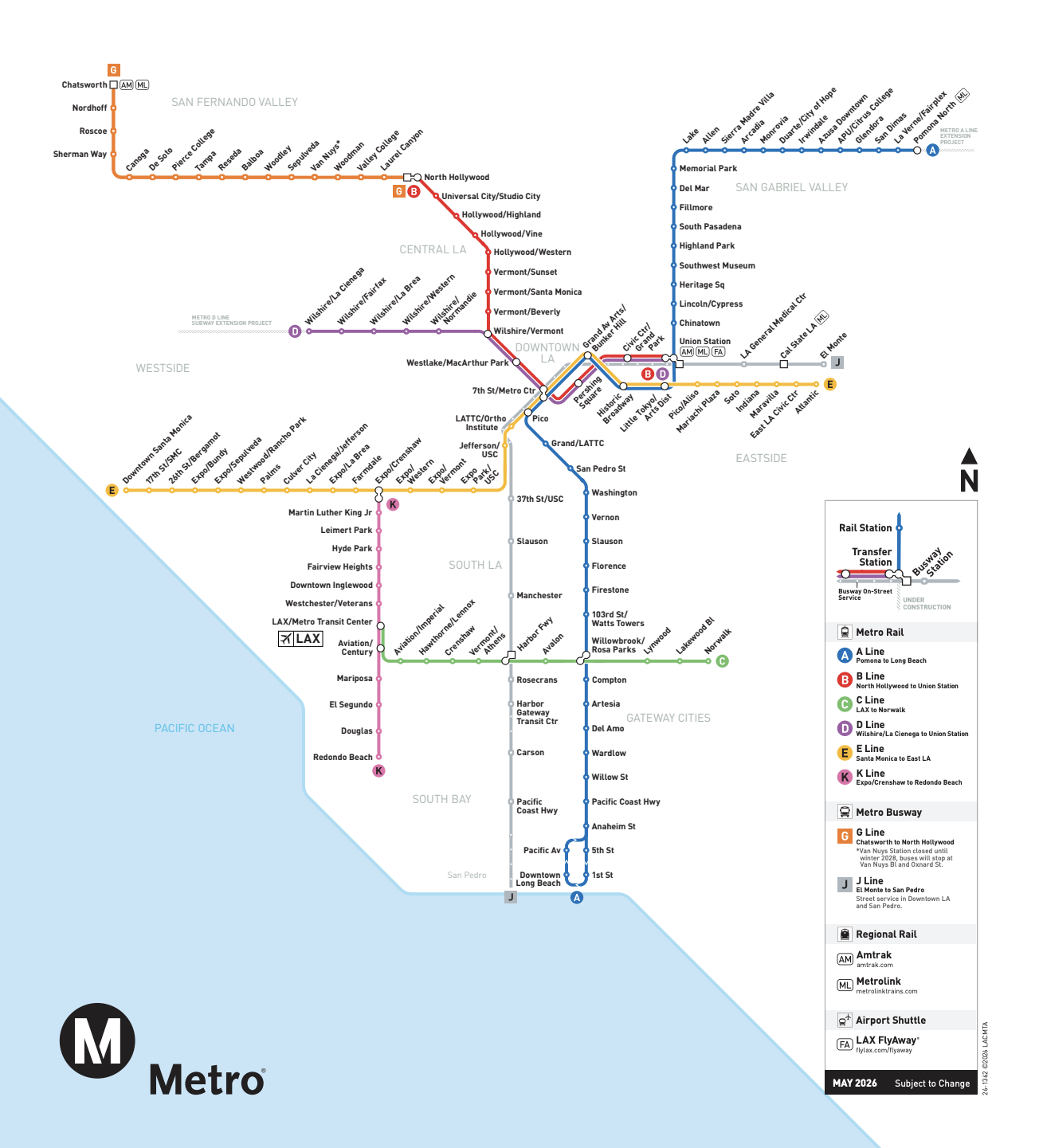
Metro Rail and Busway system map

The Los Angeles Metro Busway system consists of two bus rapid transit routes in Los Angeles County, California, operated by Los Angeles Metro. The bus rapid transit lines which compose the Metro Busway network include the G Line and the J Line. The Metro Busway network operates on dedicated busways, shared-use busways, and streets.

== Lines ==
Metro Busway lines
Line name	Stations	Street Stops	Termini	Ridership (October 2012)
G Line	17	—N/a	Chatsworth (west); North Hollywood (east)	32,069
J Line	12	31	El Monte (north); Harbor Gateway Transit Center (south); San Pedro (south)	13,765

== Stations ==
The following table lists all stations served by Metro Busway lines (Metro G and J Lines). The list does not include Metro J line street stops.

**	Termini
†	Transfer stations and termini

Station	Image	Line	Location	Connections	Service began	Service ended
37th Street/USC	37th Street/USC station platforms	J Line	Exposition Park		December 13, 2009	
Balboa	A bus at Balboa station	G Line	Winnetka		October 29, 2005	
Cal State LA	Cal State LA station westbound platform	J Line	East Los Angeles	SB	December 13, 2009	
Canoga	Canoga station platforms 1 and 2	G Line	Canoga Park		December 27, 2006	
Carson		J Line	Carson		December 13, 2015	
Chatsworth †	Chatsworth station platform	G Line	Chatsworth	Pacific Surfliner; VC	June 30, 2012	
De Soto	De Soto station platform	G Line	Winnetka		October 29, 2005	
El Monte †	El Monte station entrance plaza	J Line	El Monte		December 13, 2009	
Harbor Freeway	The northbound platform at Harbor Freeway station	J Line	South Los Angeles	C Line	December 13, 2009	
Harbor Gateway Transit Center †	Harbor Gateway Transit Center platform	J Line	Harbor Gateway		December 13, 2009	
LA General Medical Center	L.A. County+USC Medical Center station platform	J Line	Boyle Heights		December 13, 2009	
Laurel Canyon	Laurel Canyon/Valley Village station platform	G Line	Valley Village		October 29, 2005	
Manchester	Manchester station platform	J Line	South Los Angeles		December 13, 2009	
Nordhoff	Nordhoff station platform	G Line	Chatsworth		June 30, 2012	
North Hollywood **	A bus at North Hollywood station	G Line	North Hollywood	B Line	October 29, 2005	
Pacific Coast Highway	Pacific Coast Highway station	J Line	Carson		December 13, 2015	
Pierce College	Pierce College station platform	G Line	Winnetka		October 29, 2005	
Reseda	Reseda station platform	G Line	Winnetka		October 29, 2005	
Roscoe	Roscoe station platform	G Line	Canoga Park		June 30, 2012	
Rosecrans	Rosecrans station platform	J Line	Harbor Gateway		December 13, 2009	
Sepulveda	Sepulveda station platform	G Line	Van Nuys		October 29, 2005	
Sherman Way	Sherman Way station platform	G Line	Canoga Park		June 30, 2012	
Slauson	Slauson station southbound platform	J Line	South Los Angeles		December 13, 2009	
Tampa	Tampa station platform	G Line	Tarzana		October 29, 2005	
Valley College	Valley College station platform	G Line	Valley Glen		October 29, 2005	
Van Nuys	Van Nuys station platform	G Line	Van Nuys		October 29, 2005	
Warner Center **	Warner Center station platform in 2015	G Line	Woodland Hills		October 29, 2005	June 24, 2018
Woodman	Woodman station platform	G Line	Valley Glen		October 29, 2005	
Woodley	Woodley station platform	G Line	Van Nuys		October 29, 2005	
