= List of Los Angeles Metro stations =

List of Los Angeles Metro stations may refer to:

- List of Los Angeles Metro Rail stations, list of light rail and rapid transit stations
- List of Los Angeles Metro Busway stations, list of bus rapid transit stations
