= Sepulveda Transit Corridor =

Planned rapid transit line in Los Angeles, California

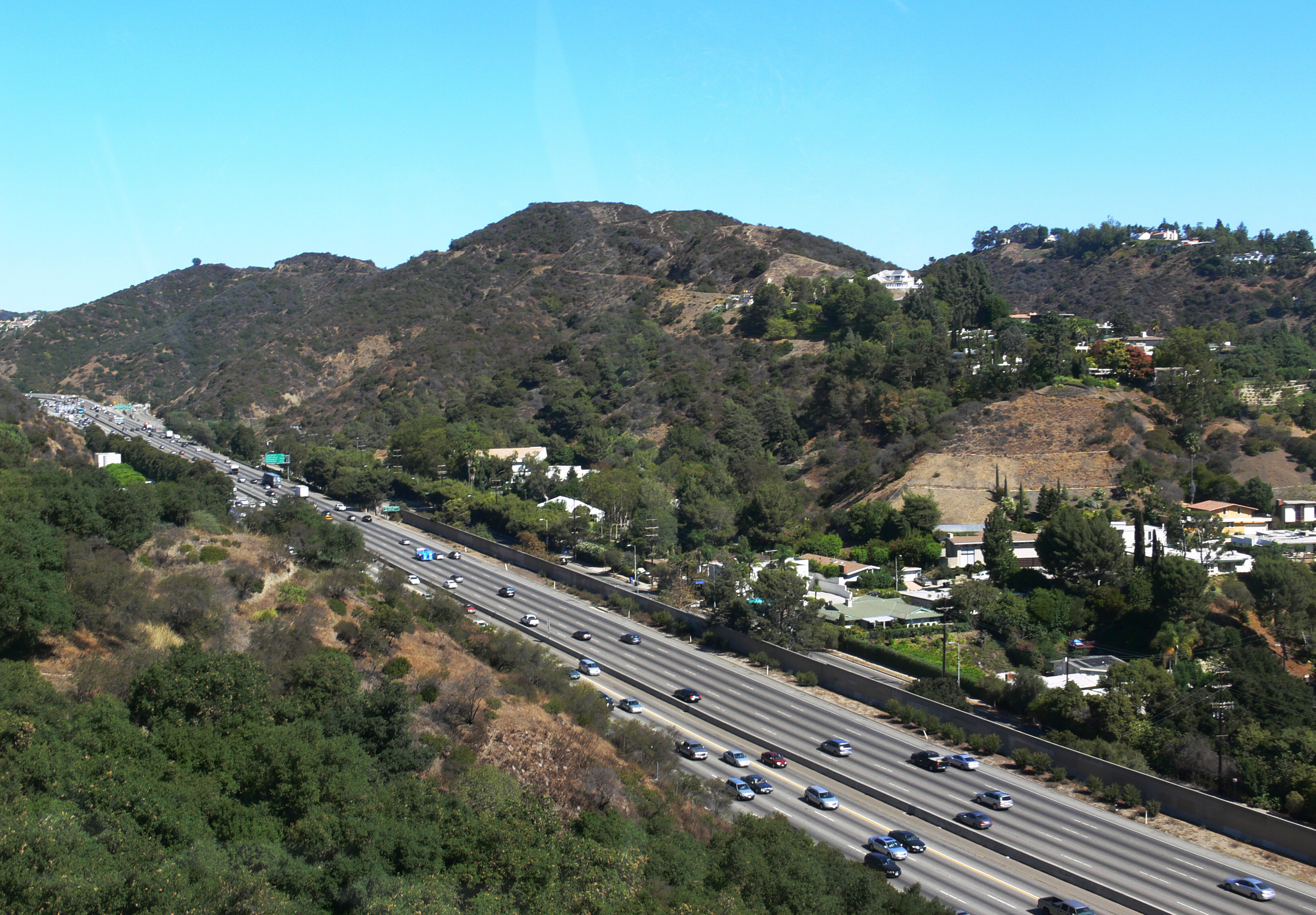
- Sepulveda Pass and I-405, as seen from the Getty Center Tram in 2008

Overview
- Status: Environmental review
- Locale: San Fernando Valley; Westside
- Termini: Van Nuys G Line (IOS) Van Nuys Metrolink (future); Westwood/UCLA (IOS) Expo/Sepulveda (future)
- Stations: 7
- Website: metro.net/projects/sepulvedacorridor

Service
- Type: Rapid transit
- System: Los Angeles Metro Rail
- Operator: Los Angeles Metro

History
- Planned opening: 2033–2035 (expected)

Technical
- Line length: 13 miles (21 km)
- Num of tracks: 2
- Character: Fully underground
- Track gauge: 4 ft 8 1/2 in (1,435 mm) standard gauge

The Sepulveda Transit Corridor is a two-phased planned rapid transit line in Los Angeles, California, to be operated by the Los Angeles Metro. Its first phase aims to connect the San Fernando Valley to the Los Angeles Basin through the Sepulveda Pass. A second phase would further extend the line southwards to connect with Los Angeles International Airport. The corridor is intended to relieve the heavily congested I-405 freeway through Sepulveda Pass and provide a fast public transit option on this north–south link.

Phase 1 of the project would connect the G Line in the Valley to the D Line and E Line on the Westside and the K Line near Los Angeles International Airport. The initial operating segment (IOS), an underground connection between the G Line and the D Line, was approved by the Los Angeles Metro board in January 2026. The project has moved into the environmental review phase of planning, and construction is expected to be funded via a combination of local Measure M revenue and applications to federal grants. Pending these two requirements, the first phase is projected to open in 2033–2035.

== Current traffic situation ==
The proposed transit line will traverse the Sepulveda Pass largely parallel to the existing I-405 freeway, which connects US 101 to its north in the San Fernando Valley with I-10 to its south in the L.A. Westside. I-405 is the busiest highway corridor in the United States, serving 379,000 vehicles per day. A five-year construction project to widen the I-405 at the cost of $1.6 billion was completed in 2014, but its impact on reducing congestion remains disputed.

Currently, what is essentially Phase 1 of the project is being serviced by LA Metro with Metro Rapid Line 761, which uses Sepulveda Boulevard to traverse the Sepulveda Pass. Its southern terminus is Expo/Sepulveda station on the E Line. It connects to the G Line at its Van Nuys station and Amtrak and Metrolink at their Van Nuys station, before terminating at the Sylmar/San Fernando station. It takes about an hour to connect the E and G Lines. Route 233 serves the Sepulveda Pass at night.

What is currently designated as Phase 2 of the project is served by Culver CityBus lines 6 and Rapid 6 via Sepulveda Boulevard, with the latter only operating weekdays. The lines' northern terminus is the UCLA Gateway Plaza (Westwood/Strathmore). Both lines 6 and Rapid 6 meet the aforementioned Metro 761 in Westwood Village at the Westwood Blvd/Weyburn Ave intersection and at the 761's southern terminus, the Metro E Line's Expo/Sepulveda station. The southern terminus is the Aviation/Imperial C Line station. As such, the lines indirectly serve LAX, requiring a transfer to a free shuttle bus that serves the station and LAX terminals. They were rerouted to the LAX/Metro Transit Center once it opened in 2025; the station features bus bays and direct connections to the LAX terminals by way of SkyLink. Rapid 6 is unique in that it has traffic intersection signal priority in the City of Los Angeles, whereas most agencies do not have signal priority outside of their base city. Line 6 completes its run as scheduled in 1 hour 4 minutes with average traffic while the Rapid 6 completes its run with 15 minute headways in 54 minutes as scheduled with average traffic.

Total transit time from the Aviation/Imperial C Line station to the Van Nuys G Line station with the current bus service is about 2 hours plus transfer time. The completion of both phases of this project is estimated to reduce total transit time to about 45 minutes.

== History ==
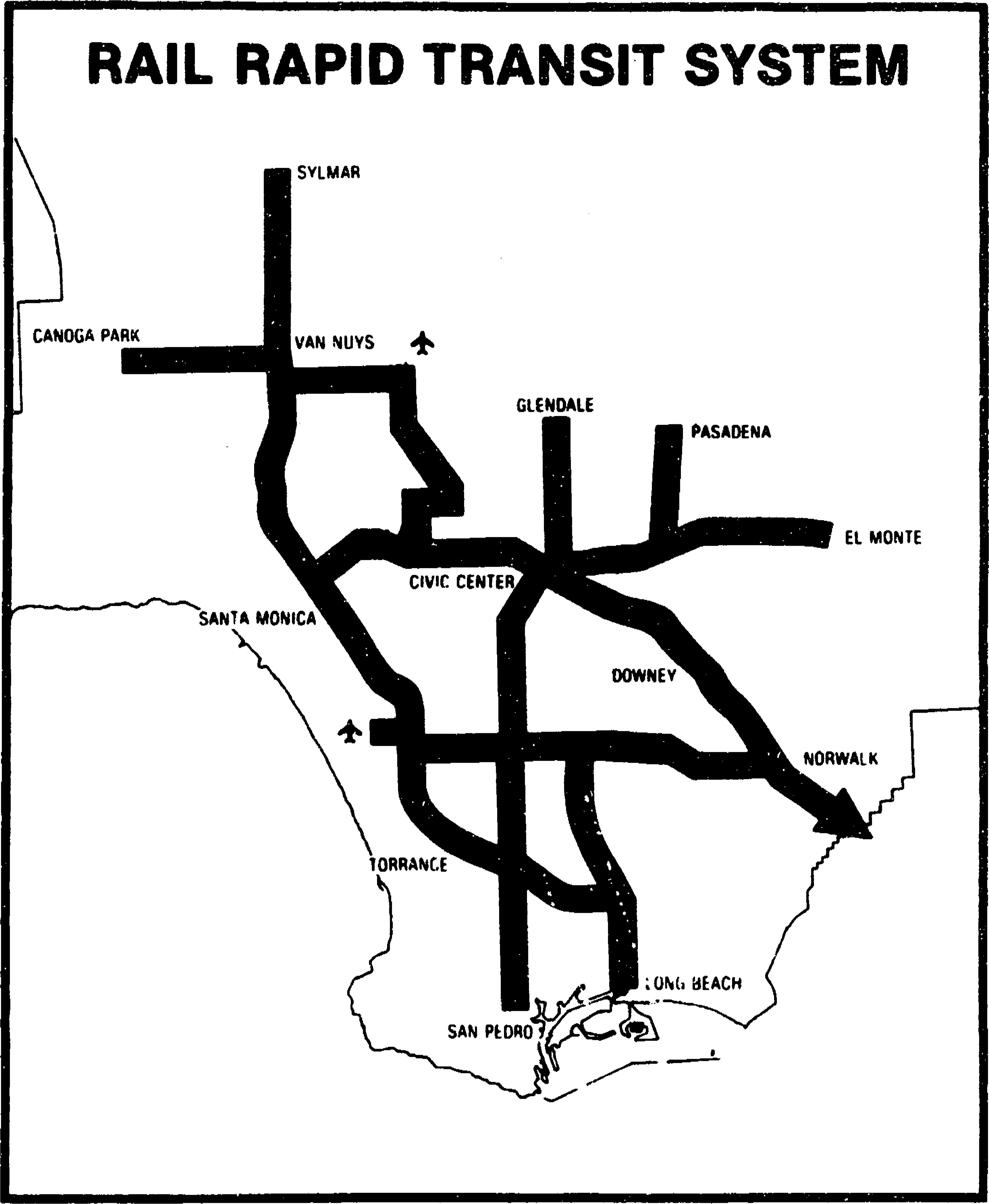
Rail system map included in the official 1980 Proposition A election pamphlet, including the Sepulveda Transit Corridor

The line is a long-established goal in Los Angeles transit planning. Proposition A, which imposed a half-cent sales tax in Los Angeles County to fund a regional transit system, was passed in 1980, and a Sepulveda Pass line was in the project map that was part of the proposition's documentation.

Los Angeles Metro has $10 billion in funds available for construction planned to begin in 2026. The plan included in the Measure M transportation funding measure is to build improvements in three stages: additional lanes to be used for express bus service to open by 2028, an 8.8-mile (14.2 km) transit project between the G Line's Van Nuys Station and the D Line Extension’s Wilshire/Westwood Station by 2035, and a planned extension to LAX with a 2059 completion date. In April 2017, Metro issued a request for proposal to study alternatives, and several companies sent unsolicited proposals to accelerate the project via public-private partnerships. The project was initially included in the Twenty-eight by '28 initiative, but was removed in March 2024.

=== Initial proposed routings and modes ===
In June 2018, Metro released its initial six alternative rail concepts for the corridor. All of the proposals provided connections between the G Line (at Sepulveda, Van Nuys, or both) and the E Line (at Expo/Sepulveda or Expo/Bundy), as well as to the D Line Extension, currently under construction, and to the East San Fernando Valley Light Rail Transit Project, currently being planned. The proposals fell into four categories:

- A standalone heavy rail (HRT) line, primarily underground but possibly with some elevated sections in the Valley.
- A continuation of the East San Fernando Valley Light Rail Transit Project, primarily underground but with a possible elevated spur to Sepulveda station.
- A monorail or rubber-tired metro line, underground on the Westside, elevated in the Valley, and running at grade or elevated along the 405.
- A further extension of the heavy rail D Line, with a wye that would allow direct connections between the Valley and the E Line as well as from both to downtown. This option would be mostly underground but could include elevated sections in the Valley.

In January 2019, Metro released a refined second set of rail concepts for the corridor, eliminating light rail and rubber-tired metro technology from consideration and narrowing it down to four concepts:

- Three routings for a heavy rail line, primarily underground but possibly with some elevated sections in the Valley.
- A monorail, underground on the Westside, elevated in the Valley along Sepulveda Boulevard, and running at grade or elevated along the 405, terminating at the Van Nuys Metrolink station.

In July 2019, Metro released a third refined rail concept after community input. These mainly covered the same routes but with a station added at Santa Monica Boulevard Station in reaction to public feedback. Both costs and ridership projections were higher for these proposals.

The feasibility study for both phases was completed and presented in November 2019, with no significant refinement from the July 2019 presentation. The study said that additional research was needed on whether the project would need to relocate or maneuver around a nine-foot wide DWP water pipe called the "Sepulveda Feeder." Additional studies were also called for on general station locations, tunnel design configuration, rider transfer patterns, and the identification of costs and cost reductions. The study also called for more information to be gathered on the impact of the Santa Monica Fault near Santa Monica Boulevard. The Metro Board then commenced the NEPA and CEQA scoping process.

Two consortia were chosen to prepare pre-development materials for the two potential modes. Initially, monorail proposals were being developed by BYD LA SkyRail Express, while heavy rail (HRT) work proposals were being developed by Bechtel. By December 2021, six alternatives had been prepared for further consideration: three heavy rail options and three monorail options (one of which included a separate automated people mover to serve UCLA). Ultimately, the Metro Board approved one of the HRT proposals in January 2026.

== Phase 1: Valley–Westside ==
=== Status overview ===
As of January 2026, Metro is in the environmental review stage of planning for the first phase, to traverse Sepulveda Pass. This involves the development of an environmental impact report (EIR) under the California Environmental Quality Act (CEQA), and subsequently, an environmental impact statement (EIS) under the National Environmental Policy Act (NEPA). The draft EIR was completed and circulated for a 90 day public comment period from June–August 2025. Next, metro staff recommended a modified alternative 5 as the locally preferred alternative (LPA) to the board of directors. After the LPA was identified, the final EIR, draft EIS, and final EIS will be prepared to complete the environmental review process. Environmental review is followed by detailed engineering and design, and then construction. Revenue service is projected to start in 2033–2035 if environmental review and funding proceed according to plan.

=== Project alternatives ===
As of October 2025, LA Metro considered five project alternatives to connect the San Fernando Valley to the Los Angeles Basin through the Sepulveda Pass, all of which are developed in a partnership with private consortia: Alternatives 1 and 3 were based around a monorail system that would be built along the existing I-405 freeway for substantial parts. They are developed by LA SkyRail Express (LASRE). Alternatives 4 and 5 were based around automated heavy rail and a new rail tunnel under Bel Air. They are being developed by Sepulveda Transit Corridor Partners (STCP). Alternative 6 was based on driver-operated heavy rail, as implemented on the B- and D-Line. As required under CEQA, a no-build alternative was also evaluated. Alternative 2 was dropped in July 2024.

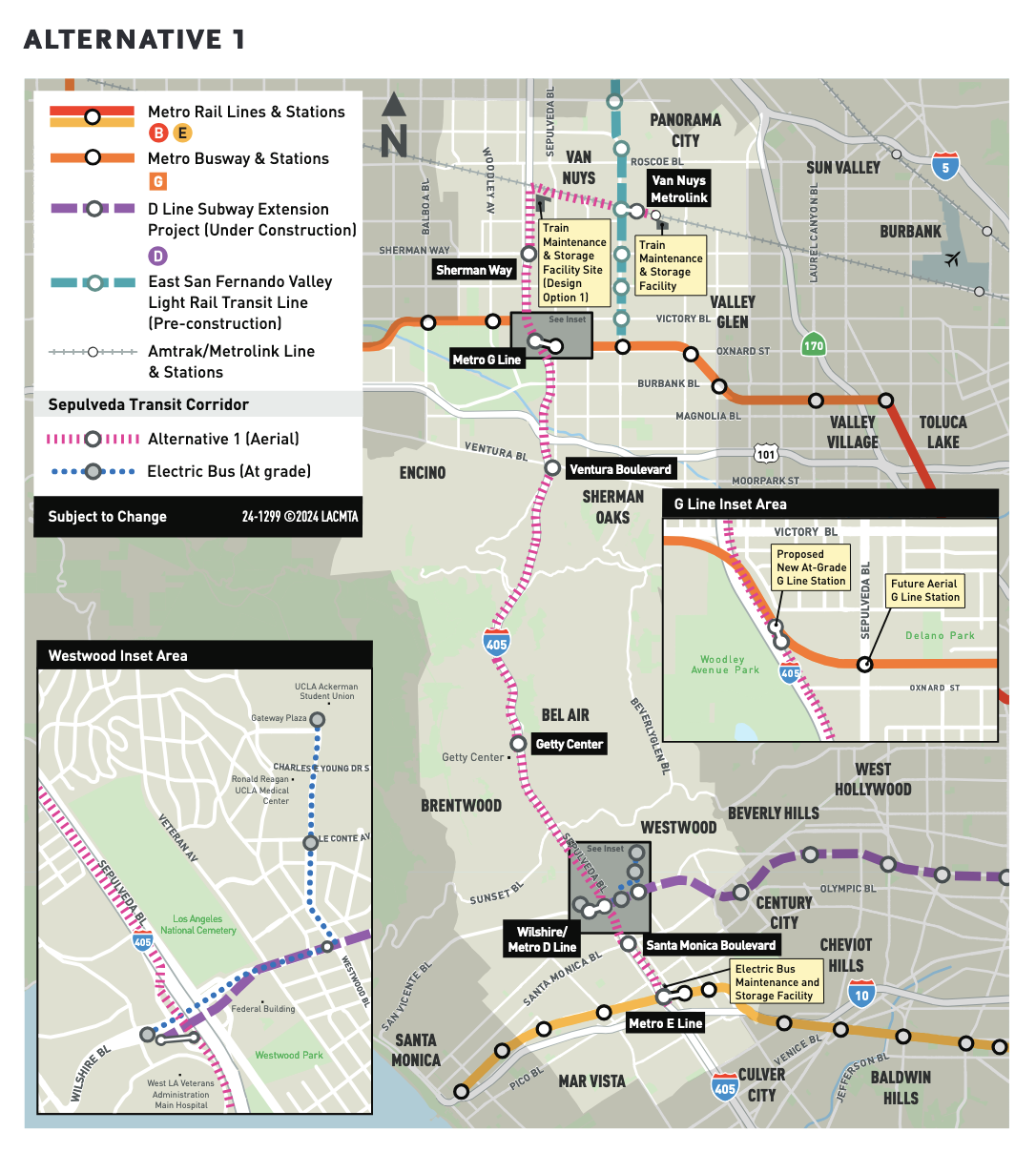
Alternative 1: Aerial Monorail

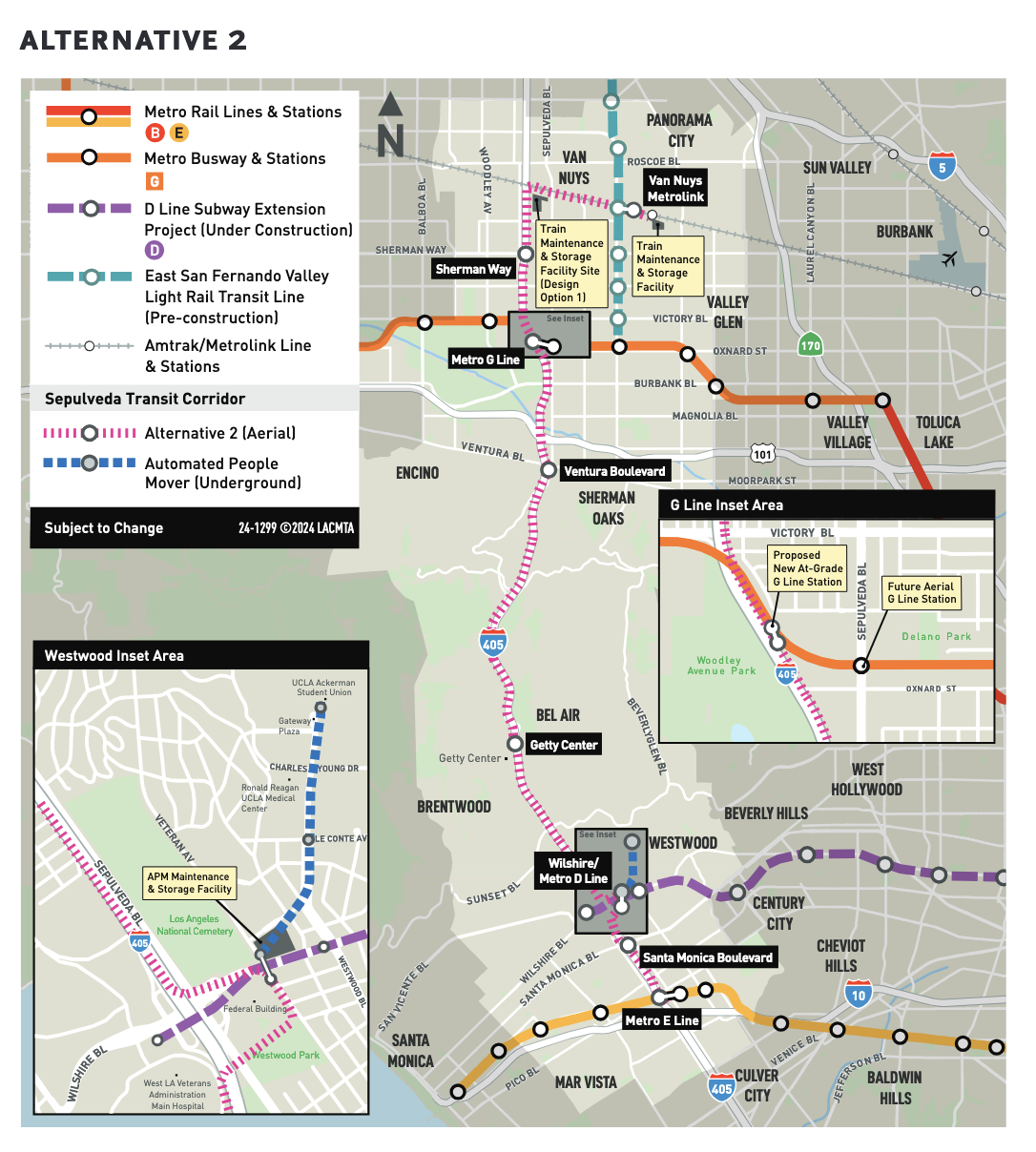
Alternative 2 (eliminated): Aerial Monorail

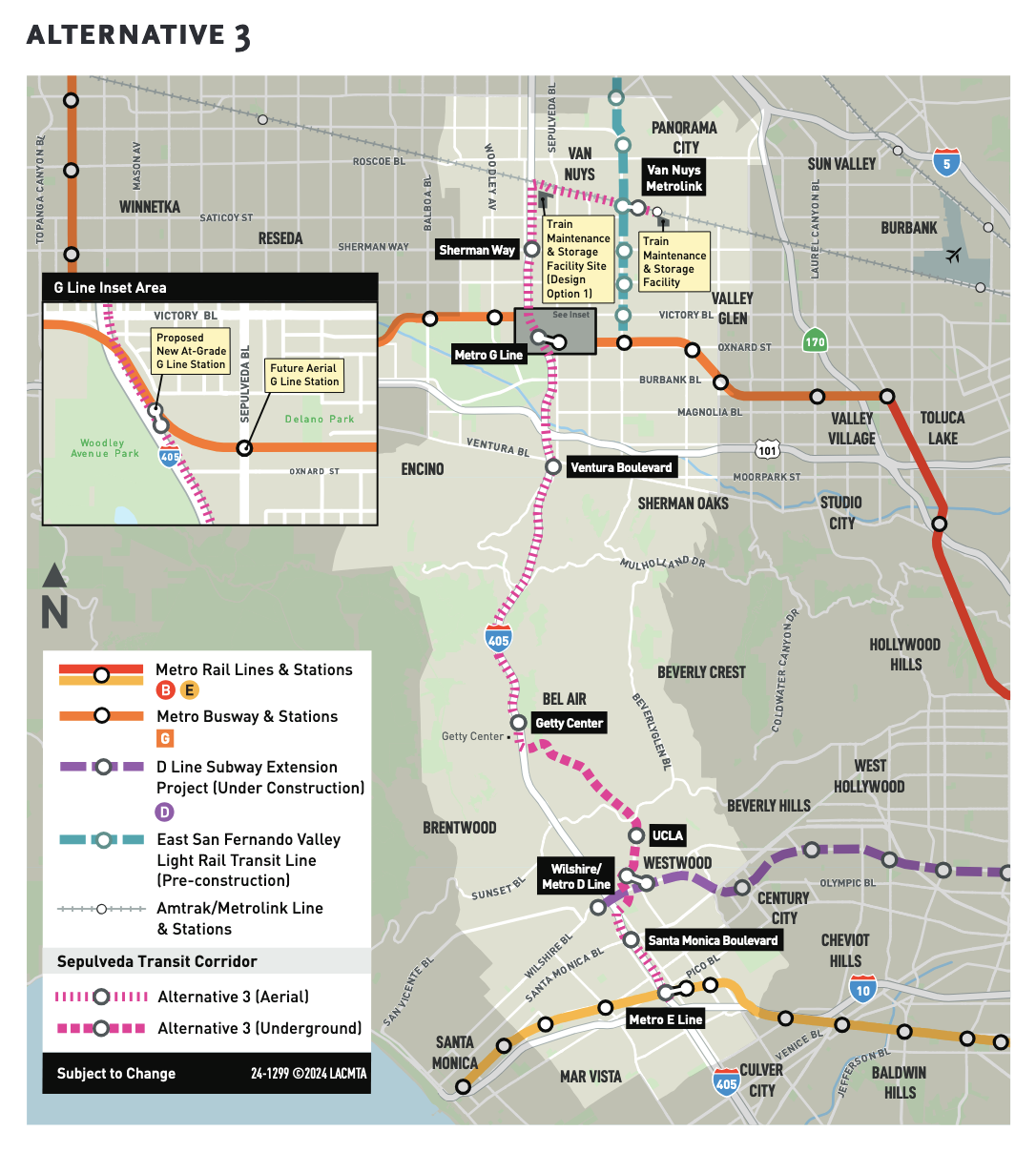
Alternative 3: Aerial Monorail with partial tunneling

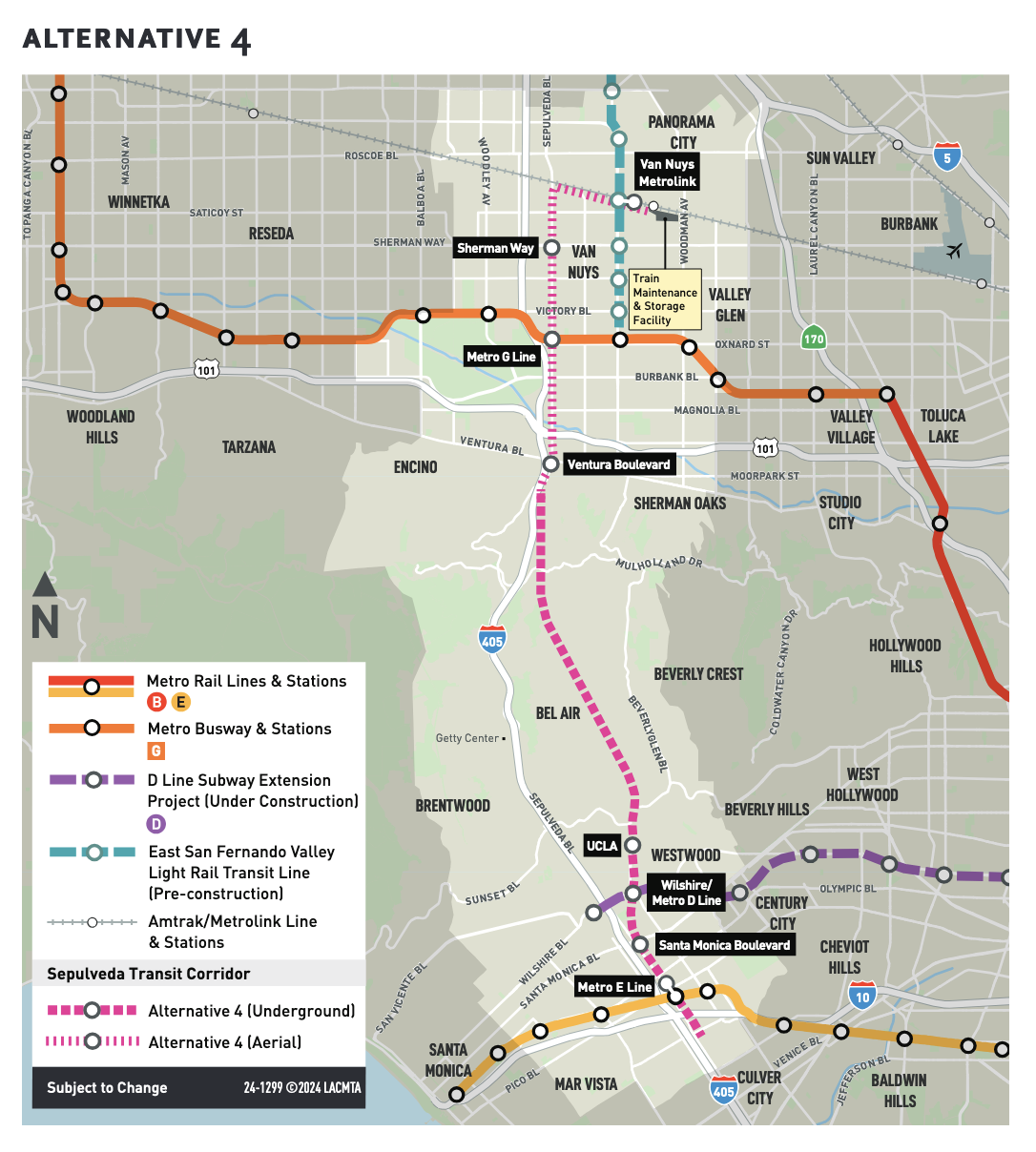
Alternative 4: Automated heavy rail, partially aerial in Van Nuys

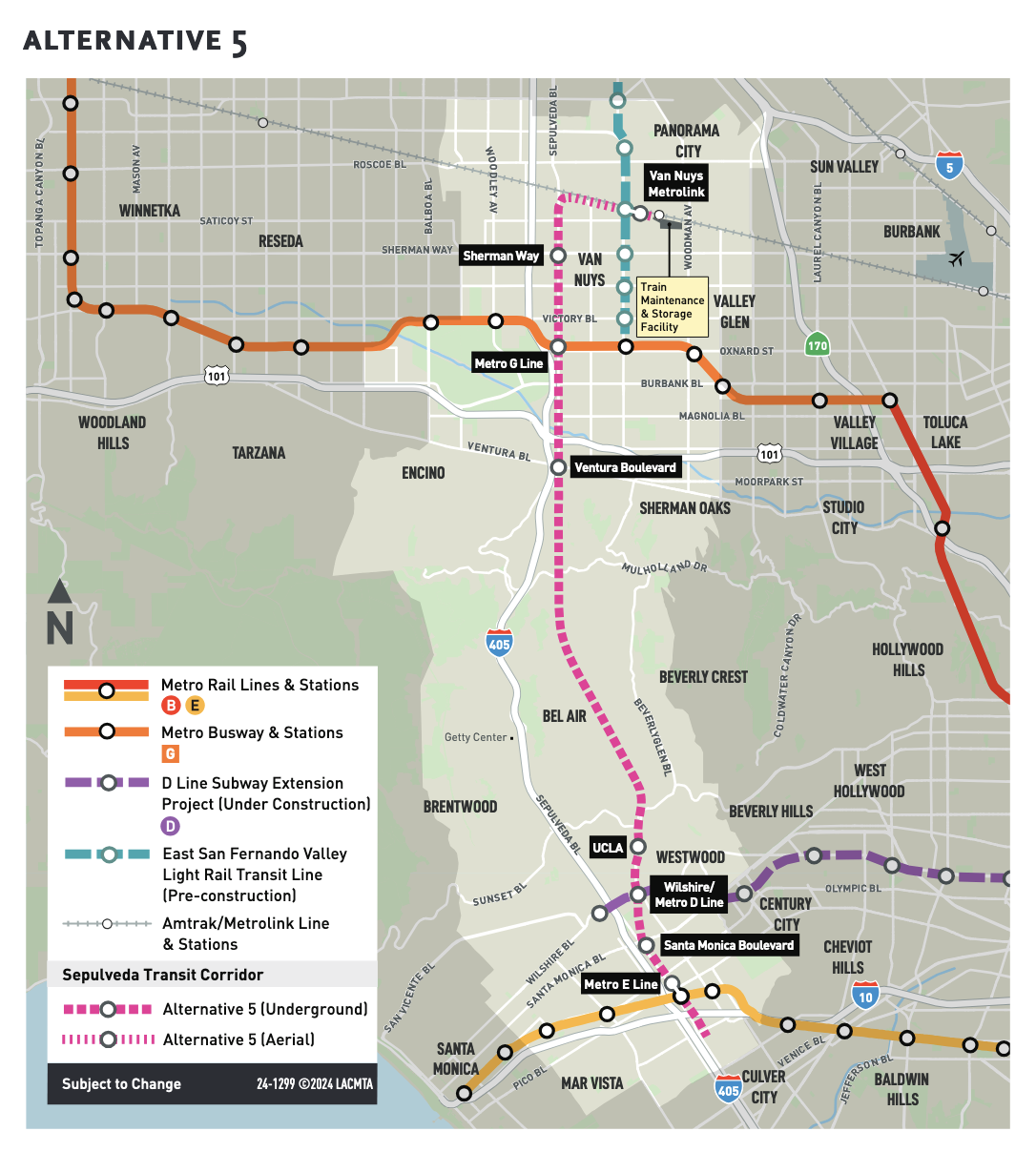
Alternative 5: Automated heavy rail, fully tunneled until Van Nuys

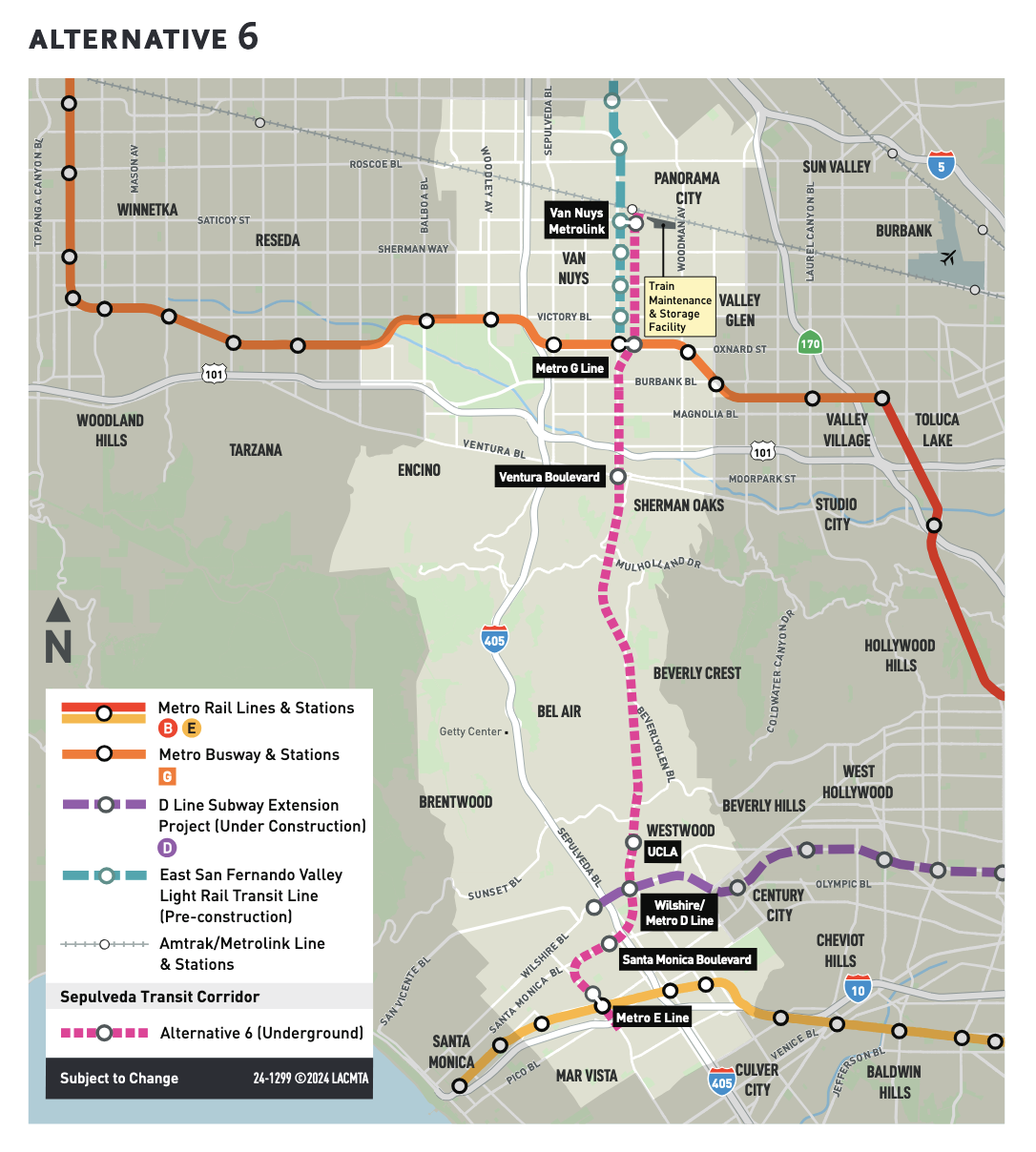
Alternative 6: Driver-operated heavy rail

=== Project development history ===
In March 2021, Los Angeles Metro awarded contracts to two consortia to develop alternatives to separately advance the project via different modes. Plans for an automated heavy rail are being developed by Sepulveda Corridor Transit Partners (SCTP), a consortium led by construction firm Bechtel, along with other partners including the European rail vehicle and systems firms Stadler Rail and Siemens Mobility, engineering firms Systra and T.Y. Lin, and French transit operator RATP Dev. The rival design approach is a monorail as planned by LA SkyRail Express (LASRE), a consortium led by British infrastructure investor John Laing plc along with other partners including Chinese EV manufacturer BYD, Swedish construction firm Skanska, and French transit operator Keolis.

In April 2021, Metro advanced the five routes to the next study stage, including three routes selected as part of Metro's public-private partnership solicitation for the line. The P3 proposals came from Bechtel and BYD Company, with Bechtel submitting the same heavy rail alignment and station proposals as HRT-4, and BYD submitting two monorail proposals that differed from the original MRT-1 alternative studied by Metro.

In November 2021, the CEQA notice for the project alternatives were released, with an environmental scoping period in February 2022. Rail options were refined to three monorail and three heavy rail alternatives. Monorail options 1 and 2 did not include a station on the UCLA campus and proposed connecting transit options instead. The alternatives considered for the Draft Environmental Impact Report north to south routes from the Valley to E Line are in the following table:

Alternatives in the November 2021 CEQA notice
DEIR Alternative	Description	Ridership (daily)
Alternative-1: MRT w/ Aerial I-405 alignment	A monorail line heading west from the Van Nuys Metrolink station then heads south on Sepulveda Boulevard. Eight total aerial station stops, similar to Metro C line stations on the center medians of a freeway. Stops include Van Nuys G Line station, US-101 freeway, the Getty Center freeway entrance, I-405 station with a bus to UCLA, a station near Westwood D Line station (with a bus to UCLA) and at Santa Monica Boulevard before terminating at the Expo/Sepulveda station E Line. A 19-minute ride.	64,798
Alternative-2: MRT w/ Aerial I-405 alignment	Similar to Alt-1, A monorail line heading west from the Van Nuys Metrolink station then heads south on Sepulveda Boulevard. Eight total aerial station stops, similar to Metro C line stations on the center medians of a freeway. Stops include Van Nuys G Line station, US-101 freeway, and the Getty Center freeway entrance. Last three stations at Wilshire/I-405 (w/ APM to UCLA), Santa Monica Boulevard/I-405 and terminating at the Expo/Sepulveda station E Line. All along I-405. A 19-minute ride.	69,985
Alternative-3: MRT w/ I-405 alignment	Similar to Alt-1 except with a tunnel, A monorail line heading west from the Van Nuys Metrolink station then heads south on Sepulveda Boulevard. Nine total stops, including the Van Nuys G Line station, US-101 freeway, and the Getty Center freeway entrance. A 3.3-mile underground tunnel between the Getty Center/I-405 station with a station at UCLA and at Wilshire boulevard. Returning to aerial south of Wilshire Boulevard. Last two stations at Santa Monica Boulevard/I-405 before terminating at the Expo/Sepulveda station E Line. A 19-minute ride.	86,013
Alternative-4: HRT Sepulveda Blvd alignment	A Heavy Rail Transit line on Sepulveda Blvd., aerial in the San Fernando Valley and underground south of the Santa Monica Mountains. Eight total stations, Four aerial in the Valley and four underground in the Westside area. Includes a station on the UCLA campus. Would make direct transfer stations out of Wilshire/Westwood Station on the D Line and at Expo/Sepulveda station on the E Line. A 14-minute ride.	120,546
Alternative-5: HRT Sepulveda Blvd alignment	A Heavy Rail Transit line on Sepulveda Blvd., same Alignment as Alt: 4, all underground except northern terminus Van Nuys Metrolink station. Seven total stations before terminating at the Expo/Sepulveda station E Line. It would be a 14-minute ride.	121,624
Alternative-6: HRT All Underground Van Nuys Blvd alignment	A Heavy Rail Transit line down Van Nuys Blvd., Heads south from Van Nuys Metrolink station, all underground. Three stations in the Valley and four on the west side. The southern terminus would be Expo/Bundy station. Direct stations within UCLA, Wilshire/Westwood D line station. Seven total stations. It would be a 14-minute ride.	107,096

In October 2023, Metro released ridership estimates for the six Sepulveda Line options, with the results greatly favoring the heavy rail option. Estimates showed that the heavy rail alternatives (4–6) not only had higher ridership than the monorail alternatives (1–3) by between 21,000 and 57,000 daily riders, but the heavy rail alternatives also were 8–14 minutes faster and had quicker connections to other lines in the LA Metro system, such as the D and E lines.

On July 3, 2024, Metro formally eliminated Alternative 2. This follows a request from LASRE for its elimination, along with Metro's independent review and public input in May 2024. In May 2025, Metro released preliminary cost estimates for each route in advance of releasing the draft environmental impact report (DEIR). Alternative 1 (monorail, aerial) budget was placed at $15.4 billion, Alternative 3 (monorail, partially tunneled) at $20.8 billion, Alternative 4 (tunneled HRT, partially aerial) at $20 billion, Alternative 5 (fully tunneled HRT) at $24.2 and Alternative 6 (driver-operated, tunneled) at $24.4 billion. All proposed budgets include the FTA's 40% cost contingencies mandate. Metro released the draft environmental impact report on June 3, 2025.

=== Alternative details ===
The following table shows all potential metro stations and the alternatives for which they applied:

Station Options	Alt. 1 MRT	Alt. 2 MRT	Alt. 3 MRT	Alt. 4/5 (Note: Alternatives 4 and 5 only differ in how they treat the Sherman Way, G Line, and Ventura Boulevard stations. Alternative 4 has them as elevated stations, while Alternative 5 lists them as underground.) HRT	Alt. 6 HRT	Connecting rail services	Community
Van Nuys Metrolink	check	check	check	check	check	Amtrak: Pacific Surfliner & Coast Starlight; Metrolink: VC; Future station of the East San Fernando Valley Light Rail Transit Project	Van Nuys
Sherman/I-405	check	check	check	-	-		Van Nuys
Sherman/Sepulveda	-	-	-	check	-		Van Nuys
G Line/Sepulveda	-	-	-	check	-	G Line	Van Nuys
Van Nuys Metro	-	-	-	-	check	G Line; Future southern terminus station of the East San Fernando Valley Light Rail Transit Project	Van Nuys
G Line/I-405	check	check	check	-	-	G Line	Van Nuys
US 101/I-405	check	check	check	-	-		Sherman Oaks
Ventura/Van Nuys	-	-	-	-	check		Sherman Oaks
Ventura/Sepulveda	-	-	-	check	-		Sherman Oaks
Getty Center	check	check	check	-	-		Pass Area
Westwood/VA Hospital	-	-	-	-	-	D Line (by 2027). Electric bus per Alternatives 1 and 3	Westwood
UCLA	-	-	check	check	check		Westwood
Westwood/UCLA	-	-	check	check	check	D Line (by 2027)	Westwood
Wilshire/I-405	check	check	-	-	-	With bus or people mover to UCLA.	Westwood
Santa Monica Boulevard	check	check	check	check	check		West Los Angeles
Expo/Sepulveda	-	-	-	check	-	E Line	West Los Angeles
Expo/Bundy	-	-	-	-	check	E Line	West Los Angeles
Expo/I-405	check	check	check	-	-		West Los Angeles

=== Route selection: Modified Alternative 5 ===
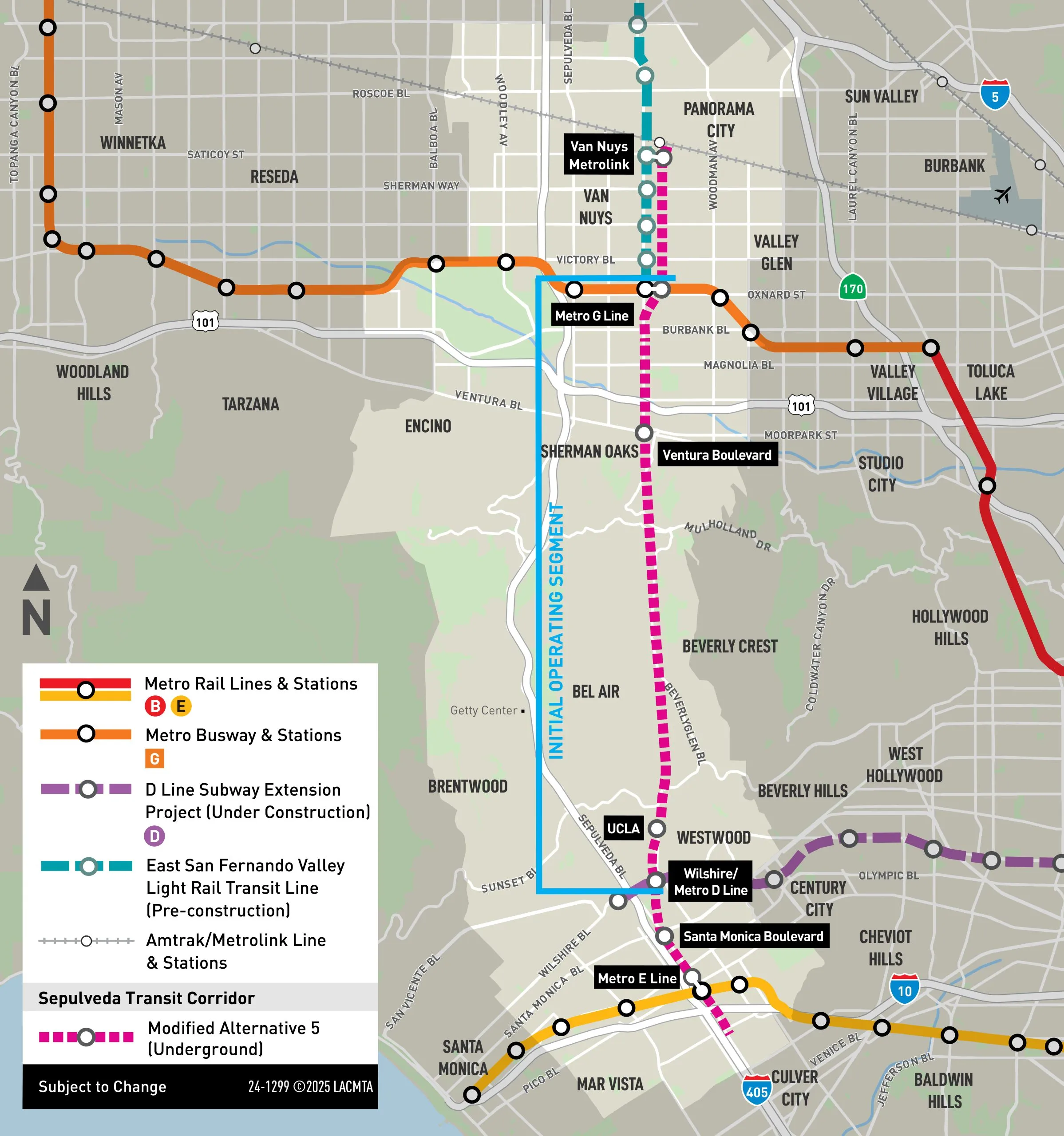
Map of Modified Alternative 5

In early January 2026, Metro staff recommended a modified version of Alternative 5 for the locally preferred alternative (LPA) to the Metro board of directors. The modified alternative would instead follow the alignment of Alternative 6 in the San Fernando Valley, utilize a different, yet to be determined location for the maintenance and storage facility (MSF), and will be constructed in phases; the section between the G and D lines will be opened first as an initial operating segment (IOS) while the remainder of the line will be constructed as additional funding is obtained. Metro's Planning and Programming Committee unanimously approved Modified Alternative 5 as the LPA at its meeting on January 14, 2026, with final approval being unanimously given by the full board at its January 22, 2026 board meeting.

Phase	Date opening	Station	City/Neighborhood	Connecting services
Future	TBA	Van Nuys Metrolink	Van Nuys	Amtrak: Pacific Surfliner & Coast Starlight; Metrolink: VC; Future station of the East San Fernando Valley Light Rail Transit Project
Initial Operating Segment (IOS)	2033	Van Nuys G Line	Van Nuys	G Line; Future southern terminus station of the East San Fernando Valley Light Rail Transit Project
Initial Operating Segment (IOS)	2033	Ventura Boulevard	Sherman Oaks	
Initial Operating Segment (IOS)	2033	UCLA	Westwood	
Initial Operating Segment (IOS)	2033	Westwood/UCLA	Westwood	D Line
Future	TBA	Santa Monica Boulevard	West LA	
Future	TBA	Expo/Sepulveda	West LA	E Line

==== Maintenance and storage facility locations ====
Three maintenance and storage facility (MSF) options were proposed during the alternatives stage.

- Monorail Transit options for alternatives 1, 2 and 3. Monorail MSF above existing Metro G Line Sepulveda Station Parking Lot.
- Heavy Rail Transit MSF for alternative 6. Van Nuys at Arminta.
- Heavy Rail Transit MSF for alternative 4 and 5. Woodman at Van Nuys Metrolink Station.

Once the alternative 5 option was chosen, metro began to study five separate locations.

- Option 1: Westfield Fashion Square Mall parking lot.
- Option 2: Oxnard Street between Kester Avenue and Sepulveda Boulevard.
- Option 3: On existing Metro parking lot near G Line's Van Nuys station.
- Option 4: North of Victory Boulevard, immediately west Van Nuys Boulevard.
- Option 5: At the Plant Shopping Center, east of Van Nuys Boulevard, north of Van Nuys Metrolink station.

=== Controversy and public opinion ===
The planned project sparked a vigorous debate that centered on the two different proposed modes: the aerial monorail following I-405 or heavy rail in a subway tunnel under Bel Air.

Supporters of the heavy rail option included UCLA, which would be served with direct station access on campus under all heavy rail options.

A scoping process carried out by Metro from November 2021 to February 2022 showed a majority of the public favoring heavy rail over monorail: 93% to 7%, respectively. Heavy rail alternatives were cited by comments as having better transfer options to other lines, faster travel times, and more familiarity with the Los Angeles Metro Rail system. Metro conducted a public survey during July and August 2022 to gauge public opinions about the Sepulveda Transit Corridor Project; after details of both rail types were presented to residents, a heavy rail underground option stood at 71% approval, with respondents citing shorter travel time and fewer surface impacts.

State assemblywoman Laura Friedman, chair of the California State Assembly Transportation Committee, implied her support for the heavy rail alternatives, citing the monorail alternatives having their stations located in I-405 as well as the need for a station at UCLA.

The heavy rail option is summarily opposed by a group of homeowners in the affluent Bel Air neighborhood, under which the subway tunnel would be built. An organized effort against this option is primarily led by Fred Rosen, the former CEO of Ticketmaster and leader of opposition group 'Keep Bel Air Beautiful'. Jamie Meyer, president of the Bel Air Association, called the proposal a "mind boggling expensive and potentially dangerous subway under our community". Local congressman Brad Sherman, who was seen as pivotal in the debate due to his position for lobbing for federal funding, sent a letter to Metro with the local homeowners' concerns, though he declined to take a side until the environmental review was completed. Main concerns brought forth by the heavy rail opponents were worries about noise and traffic disruptions during construction, as well as vibrations during operation. Metro dismisses all these claims. Further points included fiscal sustainability in light of the high upfront costs and Metro's record of cost overruns. The opponent group has threatened to litigate their claims. Supporters argued that litigation is unlikely to succeed, but may contribute to increasing costs and lead to delays.

== Phase 2: Westside–LAX ==
=== Initial alternatives analysis ===
Prior to the selection of the LPA in January 2026, Metro studied both monorail and heavy rail alternatives for Phase 2 of the corridor. Five proposed concepts begin at either Expo/Bundy station or Expo/Sepulveda station, contingent on the terminus of the first phase of the project. All routes terminate at the LAX/Metro Transit Center. This terminus station will offer transfers to the C Line, K Line, and SkyLink.

Concepts include routing south along Sepulveda Boulevard, Overland Avenue, Centinela Avenue, and I-405, with possible intermediate stops at Venice Boulevard, Culver City Transit Center, the Howard Hughes Center, and Sepulveda Boulevard at Manchester Boulevard. The Sepulveda Boulevard route option would be completed as below-grade heavy rail, while the I-405 option could be completed as either a combination of elevated and below-grade heavy rail or a combination of elevated and below-grade monorail.

Metro's July 2019 updated concepts for Phase 2 added a stop along Santa Monica Boulevard per public popular demand. They added the fifth concept, extending the east/west Purple Line Extension terminus south towards LAX, creating a one-seat HRT trip from LAX to Downtown Los Angeles along Centinela Avenue.

All north-to-south routes from the E Line to LAX are:

DEIR Alternative	Description	Ridership (daily)
Alternative 1: HRT or MRT I-405 route	A heavy rail transit (HRT) line heading south from the Expo/Sepulveda station on the I-405 median with an aerial stop at Venice Blvd/I-405. Leaves the aerial route and continues underground with stations on Centinela/Sepulveda and Manchester/Sepulveda near LAX. The southern terminus station is at the LAX/Metro Transit Center. A 38-minute ride.	MRT: 173,000 HRT: 228,000
Alternative 2: Centinela route	A heavy rail transit (HRT) line heading south underground from either Expo/Bundy station or Expo/Sepulveda station with stops at Venice/Centinela, Culver/Centinela, Jefferson/Centinela, and Manchester/Sepulveda with its southern terminus station at the LAX/Metro Transit Center. A 31-minute ride.	229,000
Alternative 3: HRT Sepulveda route	A heavy rail transit (HRT) line heading south underground from the Expo/Sepulveda station along Sepulveda Boulevard with stops at Venice/Sepulveda, Jefferson/Sepulveda and Manchester/Sepulveda near LAX. The southern terminus station is at the LAX/Metro Transit Center. A 30-minute ride.	236,000
Alternative 4: HRT Overland Avenue route	A heavy rail transit (HRT) line heading south underground from the Expo/Sepulveda station to Overland Avenue. Stations located on Overland/Venice Blvd. and Overland/Jefferson Blvd, Jefferson/Sepulveda, and Manchester/Sepulveda near LAX. The southern terminus station is at the LAX/Metro Transit Center. A 31-minute ride.	233,000
Alternative 5: D Line Extension routes	A heavy rail transit (HRT) extension south of the under-construction D Line extension terminus station of Westwood/VA Hospital station or Westwood/UCLA station, a stop on Santa Monica Boulevard and then follow the Centinela Ave route alternative (alt 2) as underground HRT. The southern terminus station is at the LAX/Metro Transit Center. A 31-minute ride.	275,000

=== Alternative details ===
The following table shows all potential metro stations and the alternatives for which they apply:

Station Options	Alt 1	Alt 2	Alt 3	Alt 4	Alt 5	Connecting rail services	Community
Westwood/UCLA or Westwood/VA Hospital (Under Construction as HRT)	-	-	-	-	check	D Line (NET 2027)	Westwood
Expo/Bundy or Expo/Sepulveda (Already Built as LRT)	check	check	check	check	check	E Line	West Los Angeles
Venice/I-405	check	-	-	-	-		Mar Vista/Westdale
Venice/Centinela	-	check	-	-	check		Mar Vista
Venice/Sepulveda	-	-	check	-	-		Mar Vista/Westdale
Venice/Overland	-	-	-	check	-		Washington Culver
Jefferson/Overland	-	-	-	check	-		Studio Village
Culver/Centinela	-	check	-	-	check		Del Rey/Culver West
Slauson/Sepulveda	-	-	check	check	-		Fox Hills
Jefferson/Centinela	-	check	-	-	check		Playa Vista
Howard Hughes Center	check	-	-	-	-		Westchester/Fox Hills
Manchester/Sepulveda	check	check	check	check	check		Westchester
LAX/Metro Transit Center	check	check	check	check	check	SkyLink (2026); C Line; K Line	Westchester

Alternative 5's concept for the Westside-LAX phase of the Sepulveda Transit Corridor Project would extend the Purple Line subway south down Centinela Ave along the same route as the other proposed Centinela Ave concepts (Alt 2). This concept would provide a one-seat ride from SkyLink to Downtown Los Angeles but would require passengers from the San Fernando Valley to transfer at Westwood/UCLA station to travel further south.

Phase one's southern terminus chosen in 2026 is the Expo/Sepulveda station, connecting with the E Line, presumably, phase two will begin at this station and not on Bundy Drive. The second phase of the Sepulveda Transit Corridor Project is not due to break ground until 2048.

== Advocacy ==
Transit advocates have proposed combining the East San Fernando Valley Light Rail Transit Project and the Sepulveda Transit Corridor Project into a single study to connect Sylmar, Van Nuys, the G Line, Sherman Oaks, UCLA, and the future Westwood/UCLA D Line station. Metro studies declined the LRT merge option and stated HRT would provide faster times and more occupancy on trains. Future extension phases south to the E Line, LAX, South Bay, or beyond are also being advocated and proposed. Metro proposed a Centinela Avenue route to LAX or thru Sepulveda Boulevard. No studies have been allocated funds.

Phase 1 of the project was part of Metro's Twenty-eight by '28 initiative, which aimed to complete its list of expansions in time for the 2028 Summer Olympics. By March 2024, the initiative was revised, removing the Sepulveda project, replaced by Sepulveda adjacent I-405 HOV lanes.
