= G Line (Los Angeles Metro) =

Bus rapid transit line in Los Angeles, California

- G Line bus traveling on the exclusive busway near Chatsworth, 2013

Overview
- Other name: Orange Line (2005–2020)
- Owner: Los Angeles Metro
- Line number: 901
- Termini: Chatsworth; North Hollywood
- Stations: 17
- Website: metro.net/riding/guide/g-line

Service
- Type: Bus rapid transit
- System: Los Angeles Metro Busway
- Depot: Division 8 (West San Fernando Valley)
- Rolling stock: New Flyer Xcelsior XE60; BYD K series K11M
- Ridership: 4,433,252 (2024) ▲0.6%

History
- Opened: October 29, 2005; 20 years ago

Technical
- Line length: 17.7 miles (28.5 km)
- Character: At-grade in private right-of-way
- Operating speed: 55 mph (89 km/h) (max.); 20 mph (32 km/h) (avg.)
Route map
G Line highlighted in orange

The G Line (formerly the Orange Line) is a bus rapid transit line in Los Angeles, California, operated by Los Angeles Metro. It operates between the Chatsworth and the North Hollywood stations in the San Fernando Valley. The 17.7-mile (28.5 km) G Line bus route uses a dedicated, exclusive right of way for the entirety of its route with 17 stations located at approximately one-mile (1.6 km) intervals. To improve performance, fares are paid via contactless payment at boarding or via TAP cards, which are sold at vending machines on station platforms. It is one of the two lines in the Los Angeles Metro Busway system, along with the J Line.

The line, which opened on October 29, 2005, follows part of the Southern Pacific Transportation Company's former Burbank Branch Line, which provided passenger rail service from 1904 to 1920; it was subsequently used by Pacific Electric streetcars from 1911 to 1952. At North Hollywood station, the G Line connects with the B Line subway, which offers service to again Downtown Los Angeles via Hollywood. The G Line Bikeway runs alongside part of the route.

In 2020, the line was renamed from Orange Line to the G Line while retaining the color orange in its square icon as part of a complete renaming of lines by Metro.

== Service description ==
Because of its many differences from standard bus service, Metro has branded the G Line as part of the region's network of light and heavy rail lines, and it appears on the same system map as the rail lines. The buses are painted in the silver-and-gray color scheme of Metro Rail vehicles. The G Line is rarely referred to by its line number (901), but it sometimes appears on documents and destination signage.

The G Line's icon color, and former Orange Line name, were inspired by the many citrus trees that once blanketed the San Fernando Valley. In the planning stages, the G Line was known as the San Fernando Valley East-West Transitway and later the Metro Rapidway.

=== Operation ===
G Line buses operate 24 hours a day. At peak hours (between 6 am and 7 pm eastbound, 5 am and 6 pm westbound), every other bus is a short turn, only operating between North Hollywood and Canoga station.

=== Station list ===
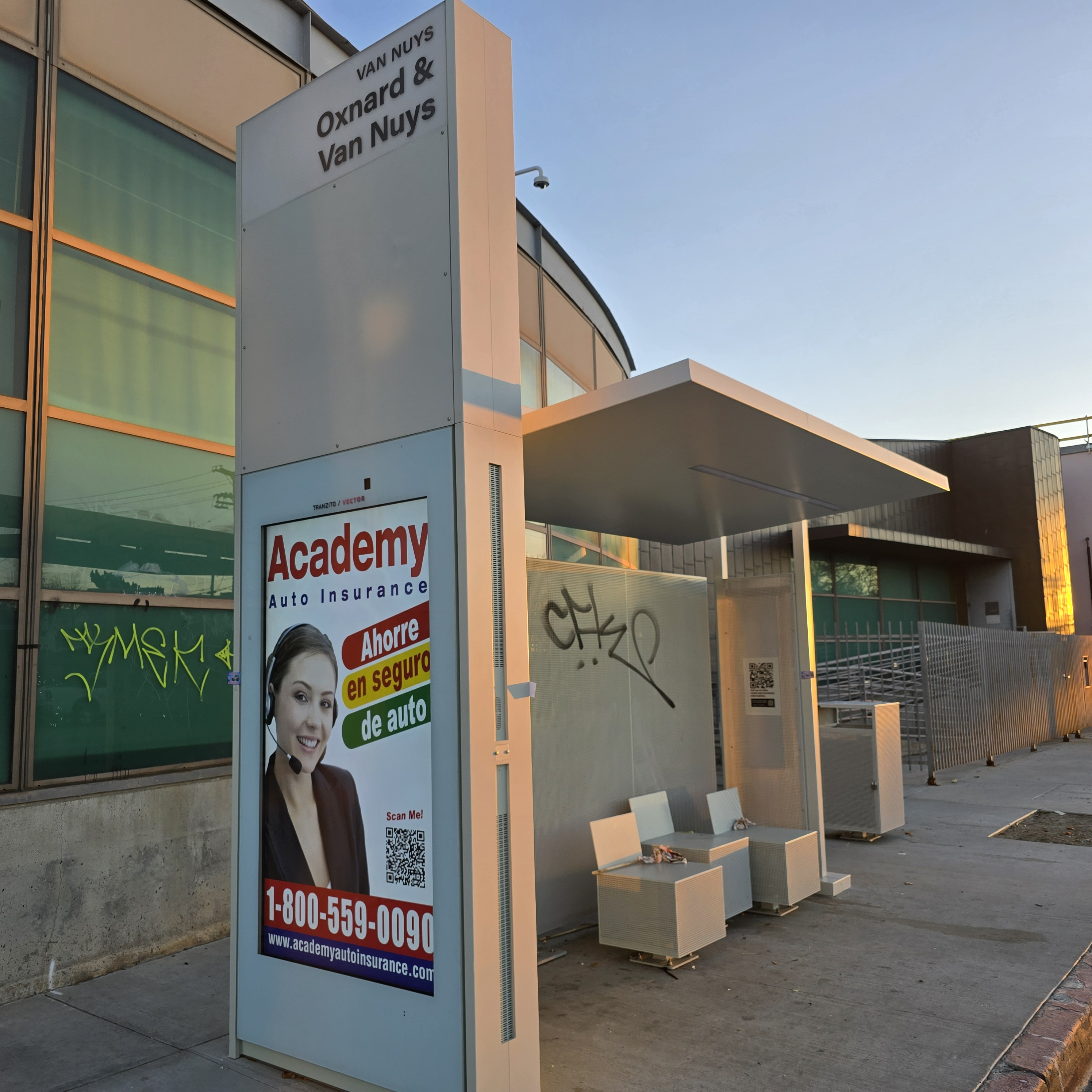
During construction at Van Nuys station, the G Line stops at the local bus stops at Oxnard & Van Nuys.

The following is the complete list of stations, from west to east. Each station is located within the city limits of Los Angeles.

Stations	Date Opened	Neighborhood	Major connections and notes
Chatsworth	June 30, 2012	Chatsworth	Pacific Surfliner; Ventura County; Park and ride: 609 spaces
Nordhoff	June 30, 2012	Chatsworth	
Roscoe	June 30, 2012	Canoga Park	
Sherman Way	June 30, 2012	Canoga Park	Park and ride: 207 spaces
Canoga	December 27, 2006	Canoga Park	Park and ride: 246 spaces
De Soto	October 29, 2005	Winnetka	
Pierce College	October 29, 2005	Winnetka	Park and ride: 392 spaces
Tampa	October 29, 2005	Tarzana	
Reseda	October 29, 2005	Tarzana	Park and ride: 442 spaces
Balboa	October 29, 2005	Lake Balboa	Park and ride: 273 spaces (closed)
Woodley	October 29, 2005	Van Nuys	
~~Sepulveda~~	October 29, 2005	Van Nuys	Park and ride: 260 spaces Station closed until 2027 for construction, temporary street stop on Erwin Street
~~Van Nuys~~	October 29, 2005	Van Nuys	Station closed until 2027 for construction, temporary street stop on Oxnard Street; Future connection to East San Fernando Valley Light Rail Transit Project (2031); Future connection to Sepulveda Transit Corridor
Woodman	October 29, 2005	Valley Glen	
Valley College	October 29, 2005	Valley Glen	
Laurel Canyon	October 29, 2005	Valley Village	
North Hollywood	October 29, 2005	North Hollywood	Park and ride: 1,085 spaces Future connection to North Hollywood to Pasadena Bus Rapid Transit Project

=== Ridership ===
Annual ridership
Year	Ridership	%±
2009	6,825,390	—
2010	7,087,074	+3.8%
2011	7,522,082	+6.1%
2012	8,528,167	+13.4%
2013	9,164,407	+7.5%
2014	8,742,210	−4.6%
2015	8,422,122	−3.7%
2016	7,754,858	−7.9%
2017	7,373,450	−4.9%
2018	7,008,626	−4.9%
2019	6,714,108	−4.2%
2020	3,523,695	−47.5%
2021	3,358,303	−4.7%
2022	4,162,794	+24.0%
2023	4,406,310	+5.8%
2024	4,433,252	+0.6%
Source: Metro

== History ==
The majority of the G Line is built on part of the former Southern Pacific Railroad Burbank Branch, part of which saw Pacific Electric Red Car service (see San Fernando Line and Owensmouth Line); passenger service on this segment ended in 1952, but the right of way remained undeveloped and was acquired by Metro in 1991. As the Metro Rail system was being designed in the 1990s, initial plans were to build an extension of the Metro Red Line there, since the purchased right-of-way's eastern terminus was at the site of the planned North Hollywood station. However, political developments stymied these plans: community objections to surface transit along the route resulted in a 1991 law mandating that any line along the route be built as a deep-bore tunnel, but a 1998 ballot measure driven by perceptions of mismanagement banned the use of county sales tax to fund subway tunneling. Prevented from using the route for rail, Metro proceeded to create its first bus rapid transit line along the corridor, and despite further lawsuits from area residents, the line opened on October 29, 2005, at a final cost of US$324 million or US$23 million per mile (US$534 million and US$37.9 million in 2025 adjusted for inflation).

Then-County Supervisor Zev Yaroslavsky said they initially mirrored the busway concept based on a similar transit system he, then-Mayor Richard Riordan, and other elected officials toured in Curitiba, Brazil.

On June 23, 2009 construction began on a four-mile (6.4 km) extension from Canoga northward along the Southern Pacific trackbed to the Metrolink station in Chatsworth. Metro's board approved the plan on September 28, 2006, and it was completed in 2012 at a cost of US$215 million (US$302 million in 2025 adjusted for inflation). This created two branches at the western end of the line beyond Canoga station; the older branch proceeded outside the busway on city streets to Warner Center. In 2018, this branch was eliminated and replaced with a frequent service local shuttle, leaving the entirety of the Orange Line on the dedicated right-of-way.

== Proposed developments ==
=== Grade separation and crossing gates ===
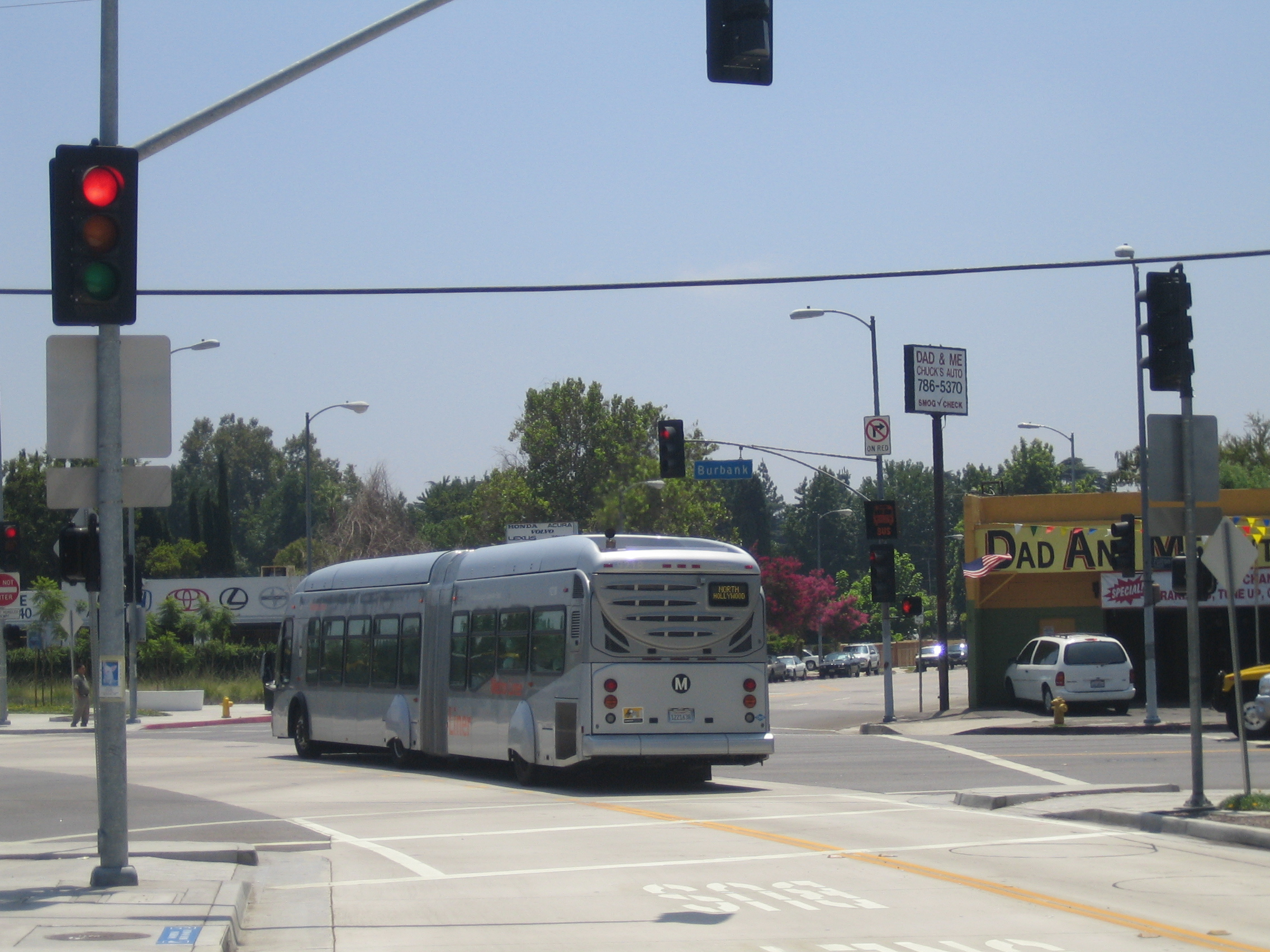
Bus at an unprotected level crossing at Burbank Boulevard and Fulton Avenue

In the first year that the busway was open, there were ten injury collisions between vehicles and buses, which were heavily covered in the media. Metro noted that the buses had about the same accident rate as other bus lines in the city on a per-mile basis, and has stated that the line's accident rate is "less than half" of Metro's entire fleet of buses. They also pointed out that the A Line also had a significant number of collisions in its early years.

Under pressure, Metro ordered buses to slow from 25 or 30 miles per hour (40 or 48 km/h) to 10 mph (16 km/h) at intersections. Starting in December 2005, red light cameras were installed at most intersections.

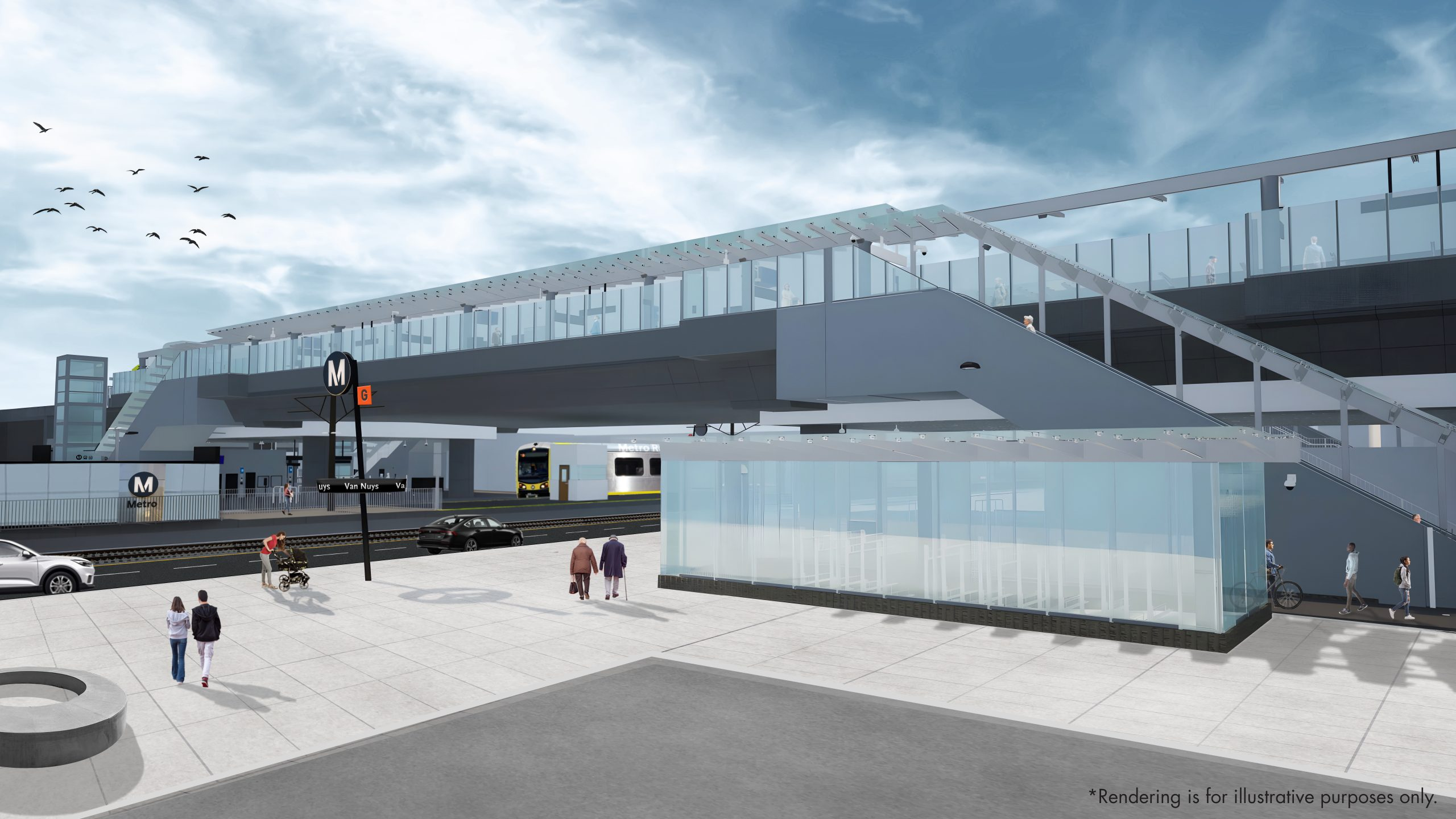
A rendering of the future elevated Van Nuys station

As part of the LA Metro system enhancements approved by voters in 2016 with Measure M, Metro is implementing several major upgrades to the G Line. These include railroad-style four-quadrant crossing gates with traffic signal preemption at all at-grade intersections between North Hollywood station and just east of Van Nuys station, a new elevated Van Nuys station, and bridges over Van Nuys Boulevard, Vesper Street, and Sepulveda Boulevard. Improved traffic signal priority will also be introduced at all other intersections. All work is being designed to accommodate the future conversion of the busway to light rail.

These upgrades aim to reduce the time G Line buses spend waiting at red lights, allow buses to pass through intersections at higher speeds, and cut end-to-end travel time along the route by 29%. The total estimated cost of the project is $283 million.

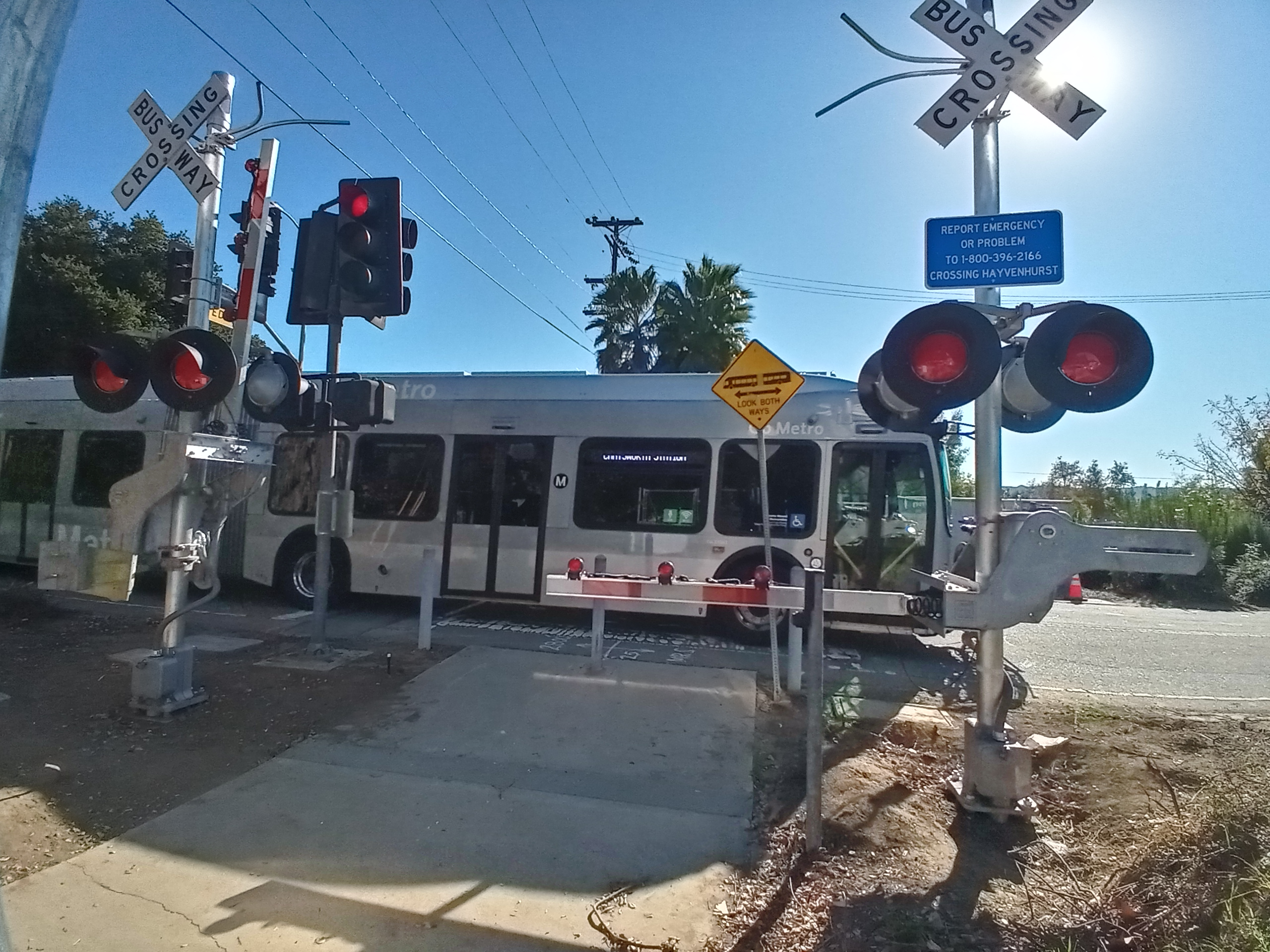
Prototype crossing with red lights, gates and "Busway Crossing" crossbucks, the very first in the United States

To prepare for the project, Metro built a prototype railroad-style crossing gate system at the Hayvenhurst Avenue pedestrian crossing, the first of its kind on a busway in the United States. The installation was completed in February 2022.

Pre-construction work began with the Los Angeles Department of Water and Power burying aerial power lines at the busway intersection with Sepulveda Boulevard.

As part of construction, Van Nuys station has been closed since February 21, 2025, to allow for the construction of the elevated station and bridges. During this closure, G Line buses are detoured off the busway and onto Oxnard Street between Sepulveda and Woodman stations, with a temporary stop at Oxnard Street and Van Nuys Boulevard. The detour and station closure are expected to remain in effect until December 2027, when the elevated station, bridges, and all intersection priority improvements are scheduled for completion.

=== Capacity enhancements ===
There is concern that the G Line will reach its engineered capacity and has already exceeded its designed capacity during peak periods.

One way to increase capacity is by platooning, running convoys of two or more buses together, similar to how rail systems operate with multiple cars per train.

Another option is using longer vehicles to expand the capacity on each bus. In 2007, Metro purchased a prototype 65-foot (20 m) bus, but no additional units were ever ordered. In 2015, California passed a bill permitting 82-foot (25 m) bi-articulated buses to operate on the G Line busway, surpassing the length of the current allowing 60-foot (18 m) articulated buses. Metro has yet to implement this option.

=== Conversion to light rail ===
In April 2015, a report prepared for Metro estimated that conversion of the G Line to light rail would take two to three years and cost between US$1.2 and 1.7 billion. This price would include both upgraded infrastructure and the purchase of rail vehicles. The report noted that if not upgraded in some way shortly, the G Line would soon reach capacity at rush hours. Full conversion to light rail is planned to take place by 2050. Different braking distances of LRT vs. BRT might be an essential concern of safety tests.

== Incidents ==
On October 27, 2005, two days before the line's official opening, a motorist driving with a suspended license ran a red light and collided with an eastbound bus at Vesper Avenue. There were no injuries.

In November 2005, there were two collision-caused injuries. In the first, a fare inspector on the bus was taken to a hospital for minor injuries after a 65-year-old female driver made an illegal right turn against a red light and struck an Orange Line bus near the crossing at Corbin Avenue in Reseda. In the second, one person was seriously injured and 14 others hospitalized after an elderly motorist ran a red light while using a mobile phone. After the second collision, Metro instructed all buses to slow down at intersections and installed white strobe lights on the sides of the buses to improve visibility. They said they would review any and all ideas to improve safety on the line.

In October 2006, a delivery truck hit the side of a bus. One person was seriously injured, and 16 received minor injuries.

== Fleet ==
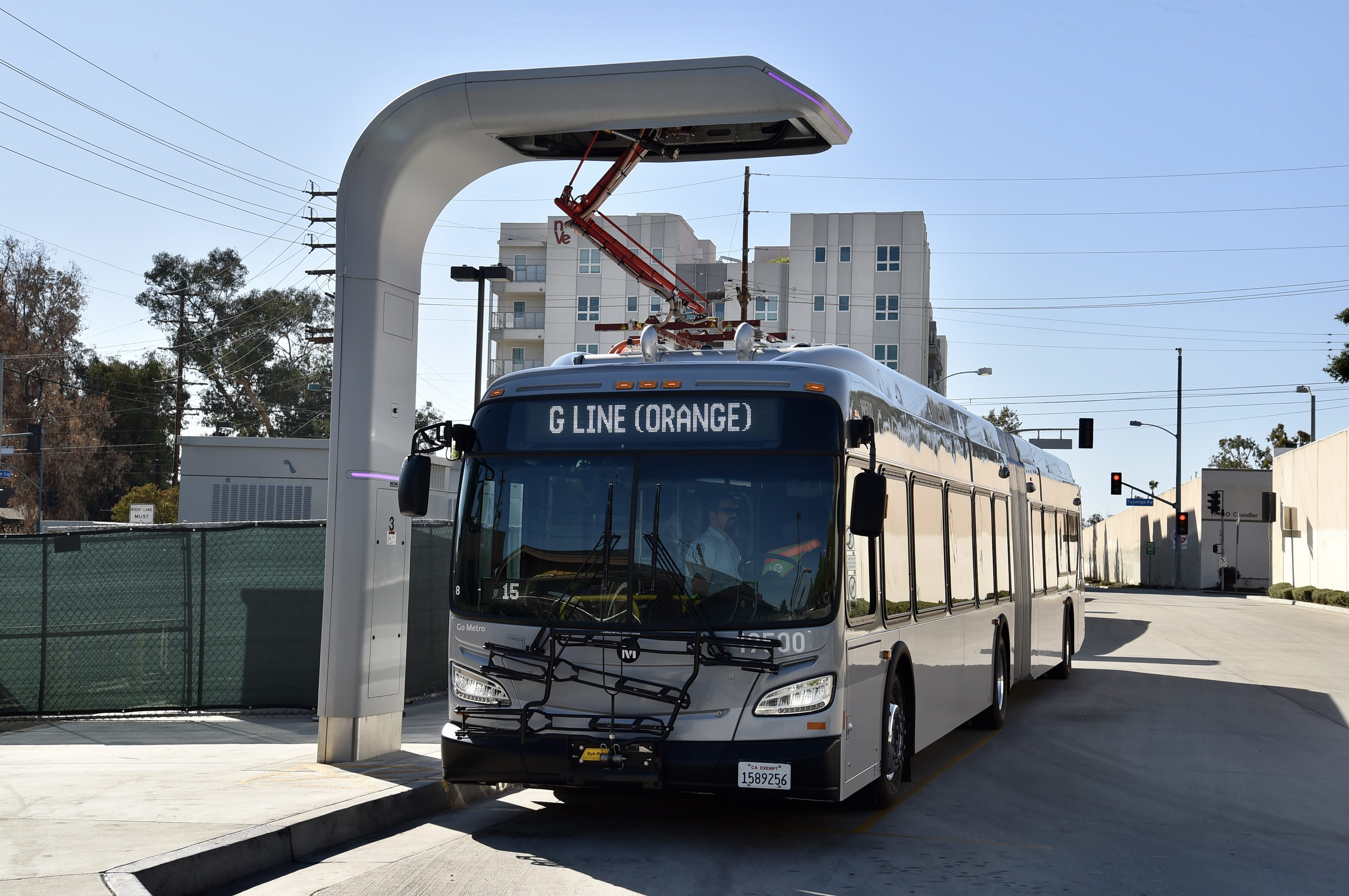
G Line bus using on-route charger at North Hollywood station

The G Line has a dedicated fleet of 60-foot (18 m) articulated buses that each have 57 seats—about 50% more than 40-foot (12 m) non-articulated buses—and have three doors (versus two on non-articulated buses). The G Line uses a proof-of-payment system whereby fares are paid before boarding. The G Line fleet is stored and maintained at Metro's Division 8 depot in Chatsworth, which has direct access to the busway.

Prior to 2021, the former G Line fleet used NABI 60-BRT buses which ran on compressed natural gas (CNG). In 2021, all NABI 60-BRT buses were replaced with 40 New Flyer Xcelsior XE60 battery electric articulated buses. Additional features of the battery electric buses include dual air conditioning units, two additional hub-mounted motors on the middle axle, an active suspension system, USB charging ports at each seat, and public Wi-Fi. They also lack the large cooling fans of the CNG buses, which makes them quieter. The G Line also uses 5 BYD K series K11M buses, which are also battery electric and were originally intended for the J Line.

Each battery-electric bus has a battery capacity of 320 kW⋅h, which provides a range of about 150 miles (240 km). There are ten 150 kW slow chargers at the bus depot, as well as 450 and 600 kW on-route rapid chargers at the Canoga, Chatsworth, and North Hollywood stations. The on-route chargers, which are manufactured by Siemens to the SAE J3105-1 standard, add about 40 miles (64 km) of range from a seven to ten-minute charge. Both types of chargers have overhead pantographs that connect to roof-mounted contacts on the buses. The depot chargers use a one-to-many scheme, whereby 150 kW from a single charger is distributed to multiple overhead pantographs. The electrification project cost US$80 million, including the buses (US$1.15 million each), charging equipment, and infrastructure improvements.

== Bike path ==
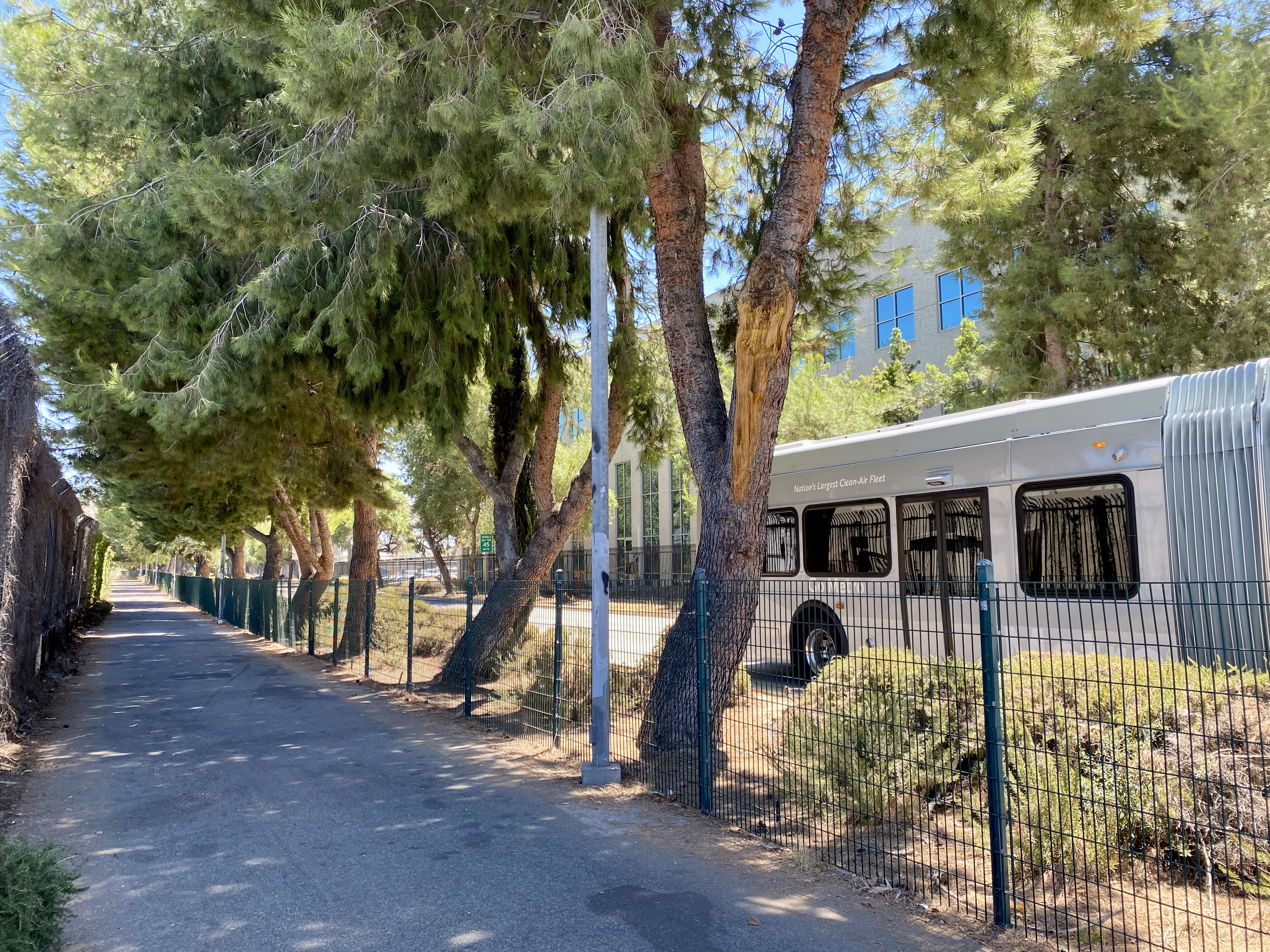
Bike path near Sepulveda station

The G Line Bikeway is an active transportation bicycle path that shares the right-of-way with the G Line busway.

The Bikeway ran alongside Van Nuys station before its closure on February 21, 2025, and 1.36 miles (2.19km) of the Bikeway between Sepulveda Boulevard and Tyrone Avenue were closed along with the station. The Bikeway is planned to be rebuilt along with the construction of the viaduct, but final design has not been finalized or published. During Phase A of construction, the Bikeway detour begins at Sepulveda station, follows Erwin Avenue, Delano Street, and Calvert Street with small north-south sections on Noble and Sylmar Avenues. During Phase B, the detour will become smaller, allowing bike riders to reconnect to the Bikeway at Kester Avenue. The new Van Nuys station will be built on a viaduct, and the closed section of the Bikeway is planned to open completely in December 2027.

== See also ==
- List of Los Angeles Metro Busway stations
- List of Los Angeles bike paths
