= East San Fernando Valley Light Rail Transit Project =

Light rail transit project in Los Angeles, California

Overview
- Status: Under construction
- Locale: San Fernando Valley
- Termini: Van Nuys/San Fernando; Van Nuys
- Stations: 11
- Website: metro.net/projects/east-sfv

Service
- Type: Light rail
- System: Los Angeles Metro Rail
- Rolling stock: P3030 LRV

History
- Planned opening: 2032

Technical
- Line length: 6.7 mi (10.8 km)
- Number of tracks: 2
- Character: Median-running at grade
- Track gauge: 1,435 mm (4 ft 8 1/2 in) standard gauge
- Electrification: Overhead line, 750 V DC

The East San Fernando Valley Light Rail Transit Project (formerly the East San Fernando Valley Transit Corridor Project) is a transit project constructing a light rail line on the east side of Los Angeles's San Fernando Valley, running on a north–south route along Van Nuys Boulevard.

The project is being planned by Los Angeles Metro and has been given high priority by Metro in its long-range plan, and funding for the project is included in Measure R and Measure M. The project's timeline was accelerated under the Twenty-eight by '28 initiative.

In June 2018, Metro staff recommended the corridor be built as an at-grade rail line without tunneling, making it a part of the Los Angeles Metro Rail system. In December 2020, Metro approved the Final EIR with the option to build the line in two phases. The second phase, which ran along the Metrolink Antelope Valley Line's right of way, would eventually be replaced by a proposed infill interchange station with the latter in December 2025.

On December 2, 2022, Metro officially began advanced utility relocation for the line. On October 19, 2026, Metro officially began major construction for the line. The tentative completion date for the first phase of the project is 2031.

== Overview ==
East San Fernando light rail map

The northern end of the proposed line is Sylmar/San Fernando station, providing a connection to the Metrolink Antelope Valley Line, and the southern end would be the G Line's Van Nuys station. An important intermediary stop would be at the currently existing Van Nuys Metrolink and Amtrak station, where passengers could transfer to the Ventura County Line, Amtrak routes, and the proposed Sepulveda Transit Corridor to the Westside. The Metro staff recommendation included 14 stations for the 9.2-mile (14.8 km) line.

The Pacific Electric San Fernando Line ran a north–south line between Downtown Los Angeles and San Fernando, partially on Van Nuys Avenue, from 1911 to 1952 before being dismantled and converted to bus service. The project route was portrayed in the project map included in the 1980 Proposition A documentation. Metro Rapid bus lines that serve the route as of 2022 are route 761 on Van Nuys Boulevard, with additional Metro Local lines supplementing both. Planning for the line will take into consideration other major planned infrastructure projects, including a Sepulveda Transit Corridor rail link, the conversion of the G Line from bus rapid transit to light rail, and double tracking of the Metrolink Antelope Valley Line.

The Draft Environmental Impact Report was completed and released in September 2017, and the final clearance was granted by the Federal Transit Administration in February 2021.

By 2020, funds were being acquired, with $800 million coming from Measure M, $200 million from Road Repair and Accountability Act gas tax, and $200 million from other state-level sources. In 2022, the Federal Transit Administration issued a Letter of Intent to provide $909 million to fund the project. In 2024, this turned into a signed agreement for an $893 million federal grant from the United States Department of Transportation. This grant was received by Metro on September 6, 2024. In January 2023, the project was awarded another $600 million out of the state's Transit and Intercity Rail Capital Program, originating from the state's budget surplus in prior years. The capital project cost for the first phase is estimated to be $3.635 billion.

== History ==
Six initial alternatives were developed during the environmental review process:

Alt.	Description	New trips	Cost (in billion US$)
No build		—N/a	—N/a
Transportation systems management		466	0.04
1	Curb-running bus rapid transit (BRT)	30,900	0.3
2	Median-running BRT	31,500	0.4
3	Median-running light rail transit (LRT) with low-floor vehicles	35,800	1.3
4	Median-running LRT with high platform stations and some underground portions	47,400	2.8

=== Route selected: Modified Alternative 4 ===
In June 2018, Metro staff recommended a modified version of Alternative 4, but entirely at grade. The underground section between Sherman Way and Roscoe stations was eliminated due to the high costs of tunneling.

Metro approved the project with $1.3 billion in funds, initiating the final EIR. The northern terminus will be the Sylmar/San Fernando Metrolink station. The light rail train will run southeast for two and a half miles (4.0 km) on San Fernando Road to Van Nuys Boulevard. It then heads south on Van Nuys Boulevard for five miles (8.0 km) reaching the Van Nuys Metrolink station. Its southern terminus will be the Van Nuys G Line station near L.A.'s Van Nuys City Hall two miles (3.2 km) further south.

Date opening	Station	City/Neighborhood	Connecting services
IOS; 2031	Van Nuys/San Fernando	Pacoima	Metrolink: Antelope Valley Line
IOS; 2031	Laurel Canyon	Pacoima	
IOS; 2031	Arleta	Arleta	
IOS; 2031	Woodman	Arleta	
IOS; 2031	Nordhoff	Panorama City	
IOS; 2031	Roscoe	Panorama City	
IOS; 2031	Van Nuys Metrolink	Van Nuys	Amtrak: Pacific Surfliner & Coast Starlight, Metrolink: Ventura County Line; Future terminus of the Sepulveda Transit Corridor
IOS; 2031	Sherman Way	Van Nuys	
IOS; 2031	Vanowen	Van Nuys	
IOS; 2031	Victory	Van Nuys	
IOS; 2031	Van Nuys G Line	Van Nuys	G Line; Future Sepulveda Transit Corridor station

By 2023, Metro initiated a new study of the northern phase of the project to better plan for how to share the right of way with an expanded Antelope Valley Line. Since development of the ESFVLRT began, Metrolink had released plans to double track their line, which was not adequately accounted for in the initial plans. Metro staff would prepare a report recommending that the second phase be canceled in lieu of adding a new infill station to the Metrolink line at Pacoima to provide connections to the Van Nuys/San Fernando station. The staff report was first presented to Metro's Planning and Programming Committee at their November 19, 2025 meeting, where it was approved, leading it to be presented to Metro's board of directors at its December 4, 2025 meeting, where it was unanimously approved.

=== Construction ===
The initial operation section (IOS) is planned to be built from the Van Nuys G Line station to San Fernando Road. Groundbreaking for advanced utility relocation occurred on December 2, 2022, and groundbreaking for major construction occurred on October 19, 2026, with operations to begin in 2031.
