= Reseda station =

Rapid-transit bus stop in San Fernando Valley, Los Angeles, California

Reseda
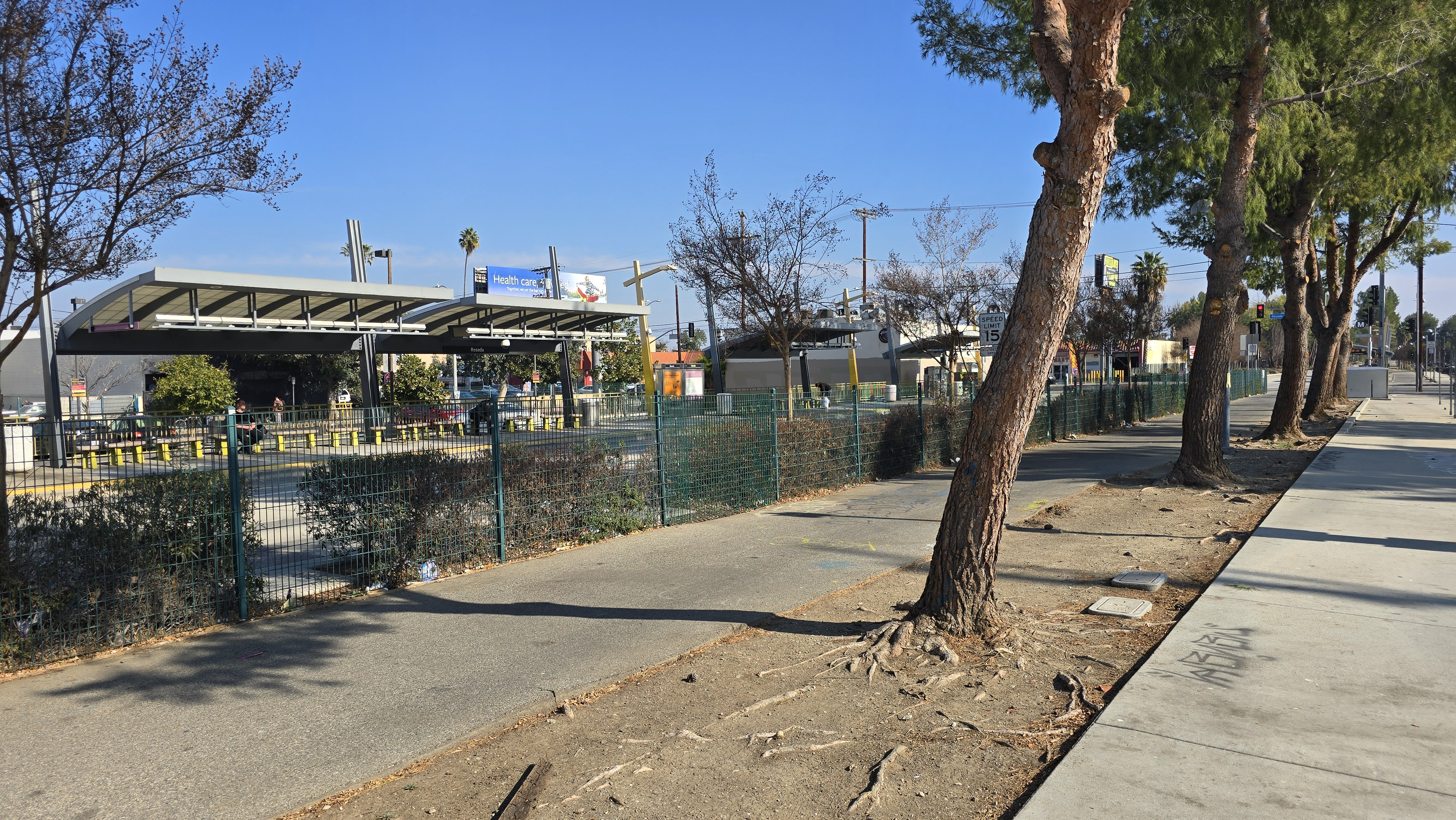
- Reseda station in 2025

General information
- Location: 6064 & 6065 North Reseda Boulevard; Los Angeles, California
- Coordinates: 34.1804°N 118.5360°W
- Owner: Los Angeles County Metropolitan Transportation Authority
- Platforms: 2 side platforms
- Connections: Los Angeles Metro Bus

Construction
- Parking: 442 spaces
- Cycle facilities: Racks and lockers
- Accessible: Yes

History
- Opened: October 29, 2005

Passengers
- FY 2025: 951 (avg. wkdy boardings)

Services
Preceding station	Metro Busway	Following station
Tampa toward Chatsworth	G Line	Balboa toward North Hollywood
Location

Reseda station is a station on the G Line of the Los Angeles Metro Busway system. It is named after adjacent Reseda Boulevard, which travels north–south and crosses the east–west busway route. The station is in the Los Angeles neighborhood of Tarzana.

== Service ==
=== Hours and frequency ===
G Line buses run 24 hours a day. Buses operate every eight minutes during peak hours on weekdays. They operate every ten minutes during the daytime on weekdays and most of the day on weekends. Night service on all days is every 20 minutes.

=== Connections ===
As of January 19, 2025, the following connections are available:

- Los Angeles Metro Bus: 240
