= Van Nuys station (Los Angeles Metro) =

Bus rapid transit station in Los Angeles, California

Van Nuys
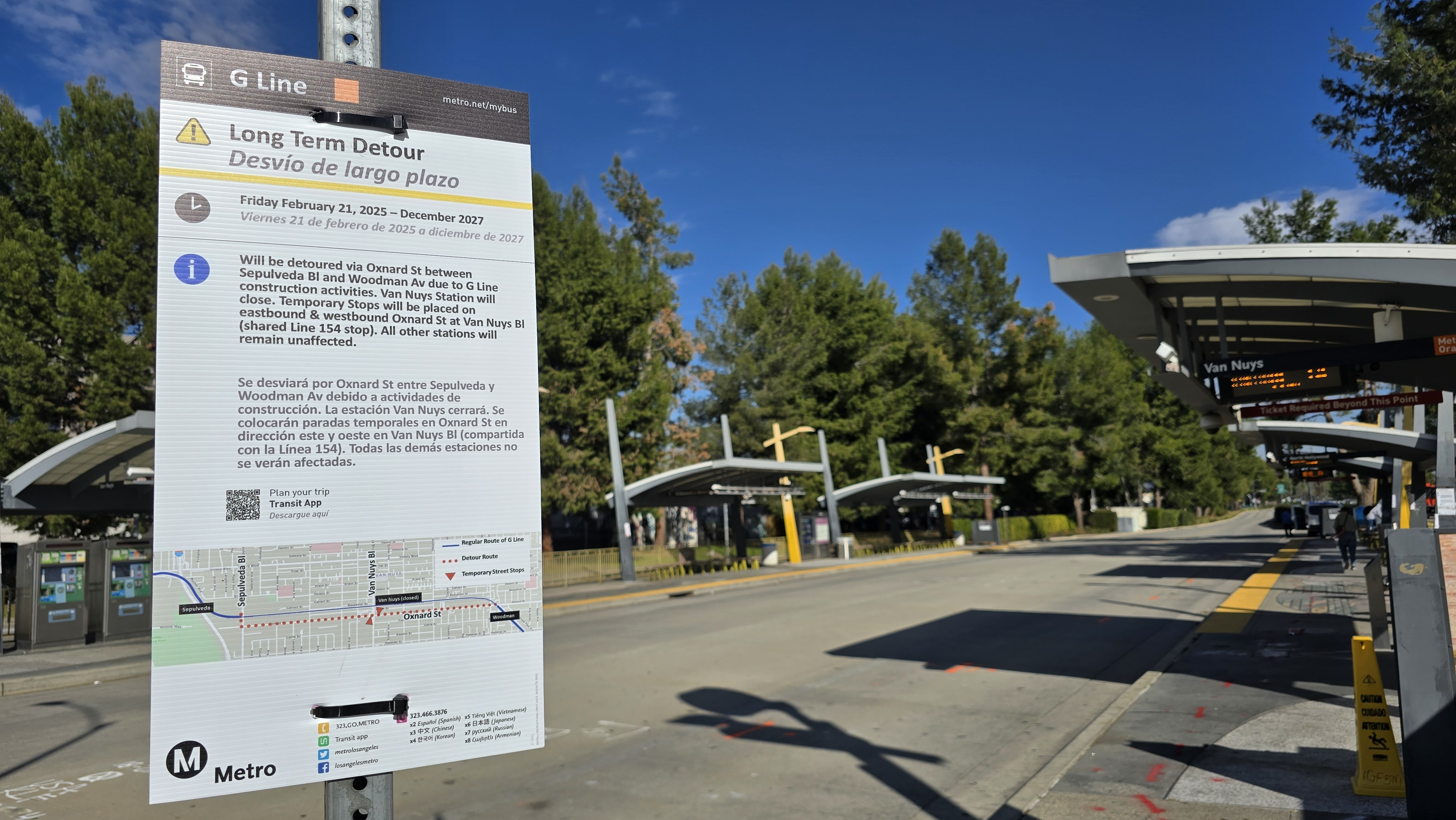
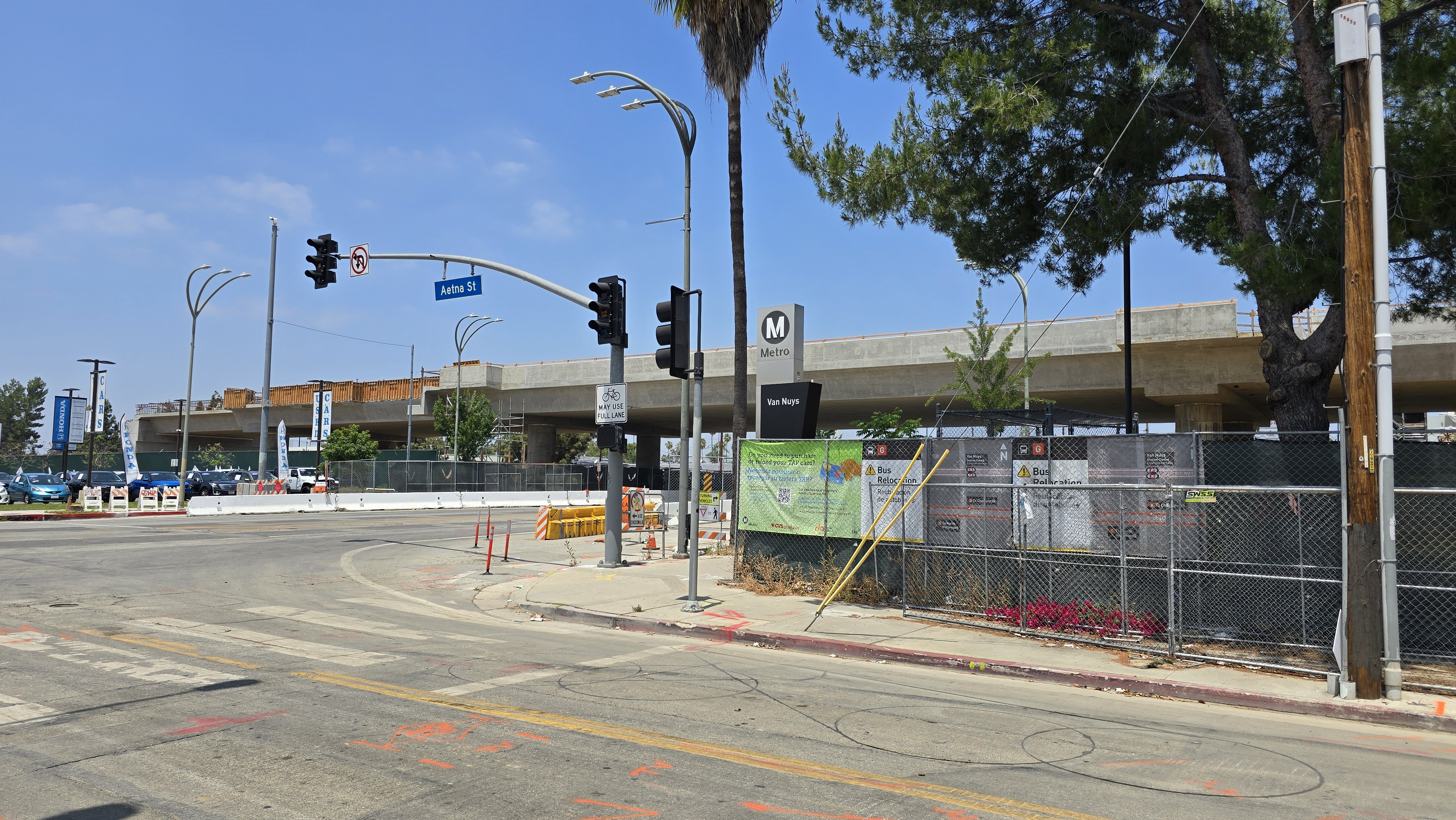
- Van Nuys station on February 19, 2025, two days before its closure The viaduct of Van Nuys station spanning Van Nuys Boulevard, with much of its falsework removed, May 2026

General information
- Location: 6060 & 6062 Van Nuys Boulevard; Los Angeles, California
- Coordinates: 34.1805°N 118.4487°W
- Owner: Los Angeles County Metropolitan Transportation Authority
- Platforms: 2 side platforms
- Connections: Los Angeles Metro Bus; LADOT DASH

Construction
- Parking: 307 spaces
- Cycle facilities: Racks and lockers
- Accessible: Yes

History
- Opened: October 29, 2005
- Opening: December 2027; 1 year's time
- Closed: February 21, 2025; 19 months ago

Passengers
- FY 2026: 992 (avg. wkdy boardings)
Former services
Preceding station	Southern Pacific Railroad	Following station
Encino toward Chatsworth	Burbank Branch	Koster toward Burbank
Preceding station	Pacific Electric	Following station
North Sherman Way toward Canoga Park	Owensmouth	Whitley toward Subway Terminal
North Sherman Way toward San Fernando	San Fernando	Whitley toward Subway Terminal
Future services
Preceding station	Metro Busway	Following station
Sepulveda toward Chatsworth	G Line	Woodman toward North Hollywood
Preceding station	Metro Rail	Following station
Victory toward Van Nuys/San Fernando	East San Fernando Valley Light Rail Transit Project	Terminus
Location

Van Nuys station is a temporarily closed bus rapid transit station on the G Line of the Los Angeles Metro Busway system. It has been closed since February 21, 2025, for the G Line Improvements Project, with G Line buses detoured to a temporary stop on Oxnard Street, one block south of the busway. It is being rebuilt as an elevated station on a viaduct over Van Nuys Boulevard and Vesper Avenue, north–south roads that run perpendicular to the station. Once completed it will continue serving the Van Nuys neighborhood of Los Angeles in the San Fernando Valley. The project is expected to be completed in December 2027.

The construction also impacts the G Line Bikeway, which previously ran alongside the busway. A 1.36-mile (2.19 km) section between Sepulveda Boulevard and Tyrone Avenue was closed to allow utility lines to be relocated under the bike path. After work is completed, the bikeway will be rebuilt. A detour routes cyclists onto nearby neighborhood streets.

== Service ==
=== Connections ===
As of February 20, 2025, the following connections are available:

- Los Angeles Metro Bus: 154, 233, 237, Rapid 761
- LADOT DASH: Van Nuys/Studio City

== History ==
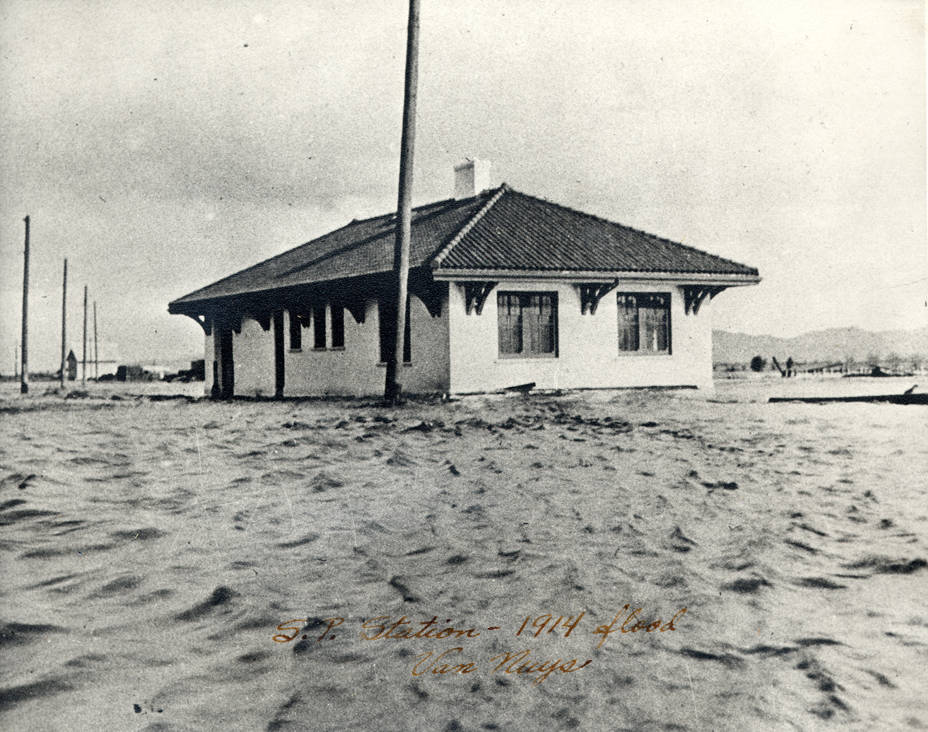
Van Nuys Southern Pacific depot during a flood, 1914

The corridor on which Van Nuys station sits was a rail line, the Burbank Line, built through the San Fernando Valley by Southern Pacific in 1893.

When the Montalvo Cutoff was constructed in 1904, most traffic was diverted over a new mainline which ran diagonally across the valley and the tracks were relegated to branch status.

In 1911, Pacific Electric opened its Owensmouth Line, travelling north–south on Van Nuys Boulevard between Chandler Boulevard and Sherman Way. This is why Chandler Boulevard's western terminus features a wide radius turn onto Van Nuys Boulevard, and why Sherman Circle, a similar wide-radius turn road connecting Van Nuys Boulevard and Sherman Way, survives to this day.

The Orange Line (now the G Line) began operations over the former Burbank branch with new facilities to serve rapid buses on October 29, 2005.

Van Nuys station was closed at 12:01am on February 21, 2025. The next G Line bus, scheduled at 12:15am, was diverted onto Oxnard Street for a long-term detour, expected to last three years as a new elevated Van Nuys station is built. During the detour, G Line buses will still stop at the corner of Oxnard and Van Nuys, one block south of the station.

When the East San Fernando Valley Light Rail Transit Project is built, it will take over a portion of the old Owensmouth Line between the G Line and Sherman Way.

=== Future development ===
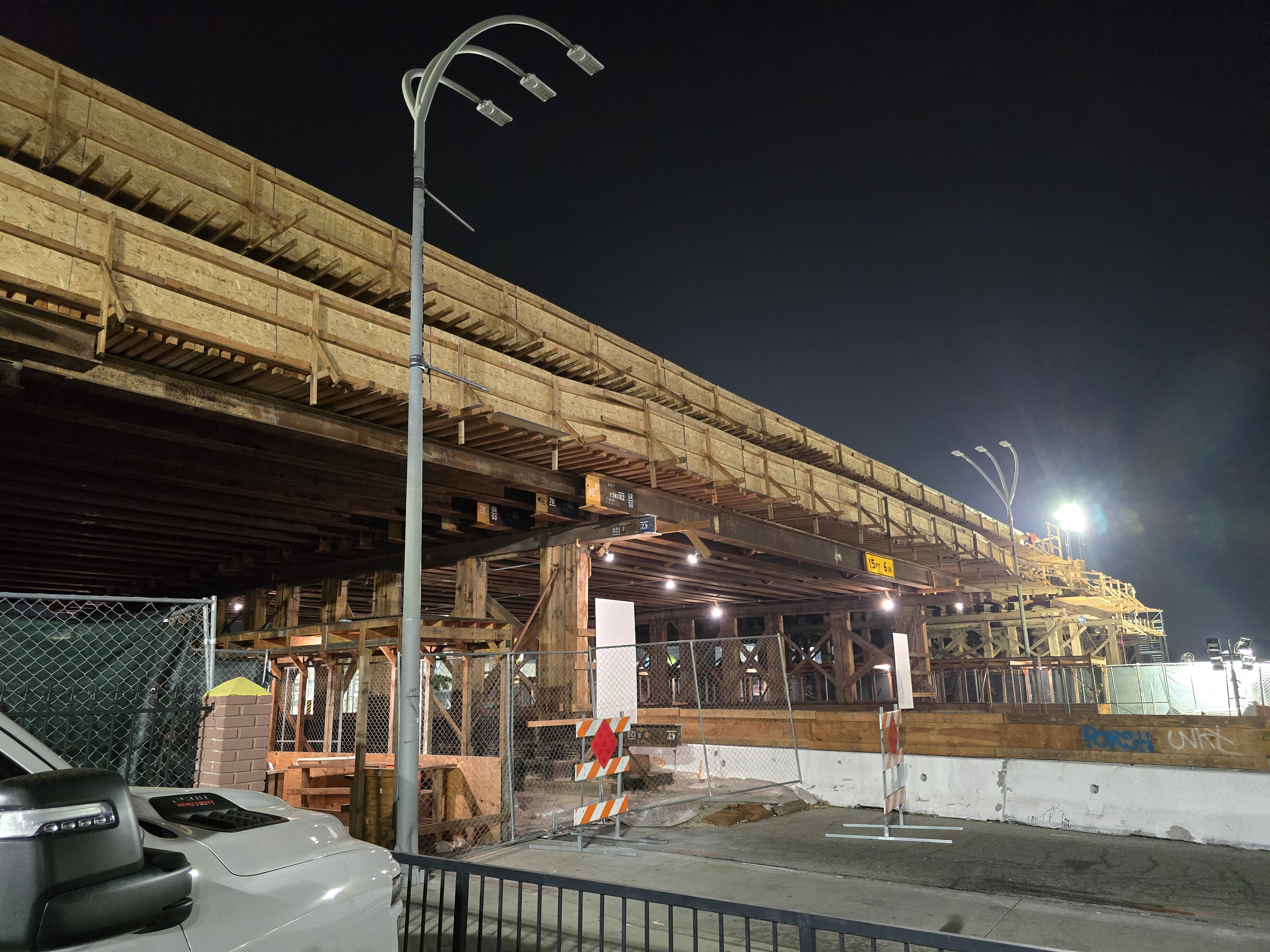
The viaduct for the elevated Van Nuys station under construction in December 2025

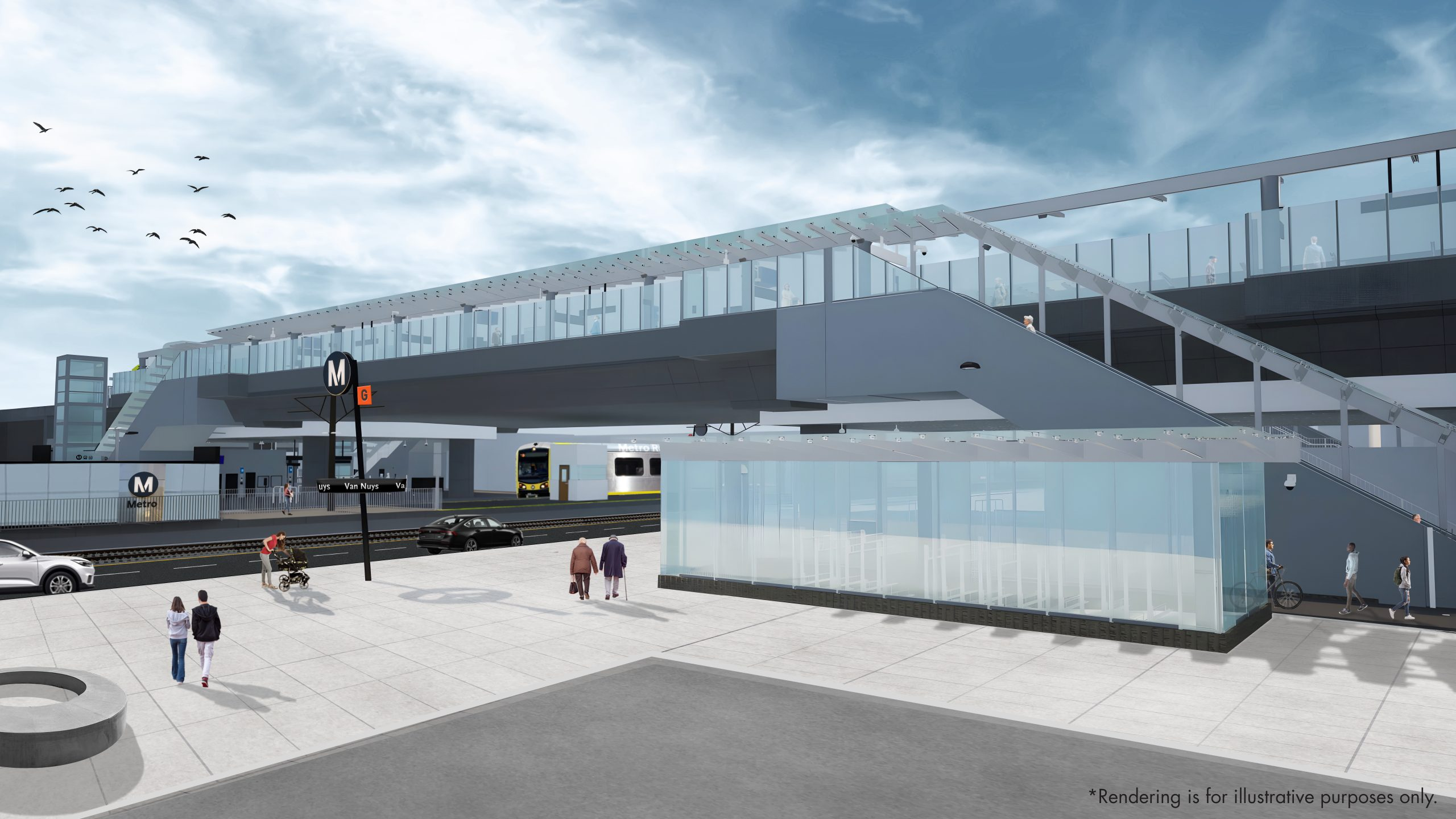
A rendering of the new elevated Van Nuys station. The rail line seen beneath the bridge is the future East San Fernando Valley Light Rail Transit Project.

As part of the G Line Improvements Project, Van Nuys is being rebuilt as an elevated station, to make the G Line more reliable, safer and faster by eliminating interference from traffic. The station viaduct will cross both Van Nuys Boulevard and Vesper Avenue.

Van Nuys station will serve as the southern terminus of the East San Fernando Valley Light Rail Transit Project light rail line in 2031. In June 2018, Metro staff recommended light rail as the preferred transport mode along this route. This route will connect to Amtrak and Metrolink's Van Nuys train station and Sylmar/San Fernando Metrolink station to the north. Additionally, the Sepulveda Transit Corridor HRT service will also be added to connect to the station as early as 2033.

== Nearby notable places ==
- Van Nuys City Hall
- Van Nuys Branch Library
