= Tampa station (Los Angeles Metro) =

Bus station in Los Angeles, California

Tampa
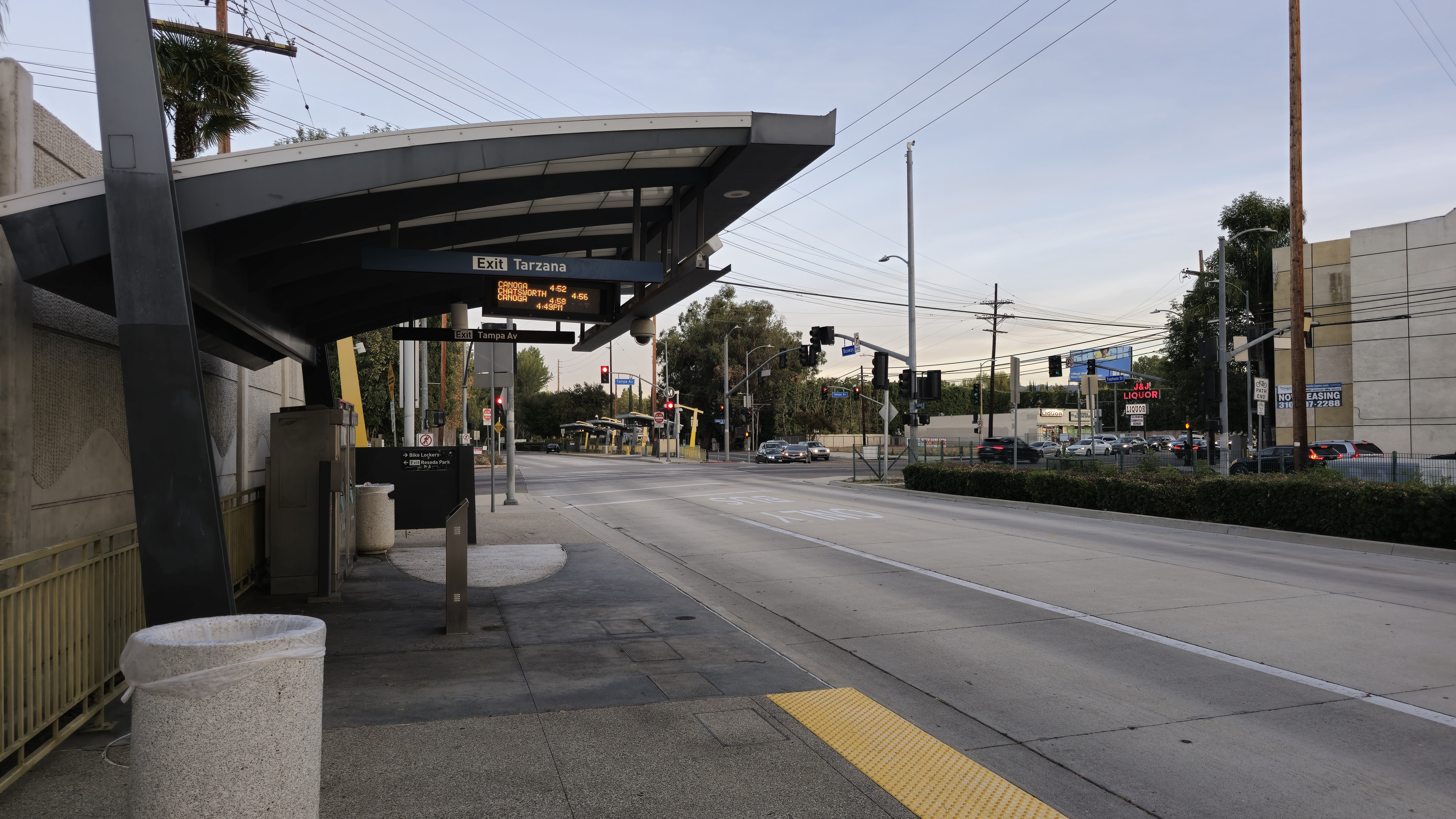
- Tampa station platform in 2024

General information
- Location: 6100 & 6101 Tampa Avenue; Los Angeles, California
- Coordinates: 34.1812°N 118.5535°W
- Owner: Los Angeles County Metropolitan Transportation Authority
- Platforms: 2 side platforms
- Connections: Los Angeles Metro Bus

Construction
- Cycle facilities: Racks and lockers
- Accessible: Yes

History
- Opened: October 29, 2005

Passengers
- FY 2025: 258 (avg. wkdy boardings)

Services
Preceding station	Metro Busway	Following station
Pierce College toward Chatsworth	G Line	Reseda toward North Hollywood
Location

Tampa station is a station on the G Line of the Los Angeles Metro Busway system. It is named after adjacent Tampa Avenue, which travels north–south and crosses the east–west busway route. The artwork at this station is by Sandow Birk. The station is in the Tarzana neighborhood of Los Angeles.

== Service ==
=== Hours and frequency ===
G Line buses run 24 hours a day. Buses operate every eight minutes during peak hours on weekdays. They operate every ten minutes during the daytime on weekdays and most of the day on weekends. Night service on all days is every 20 minutes.

=== Connections ===
As of January 19, 2025, the following connections are available:

- Los Angeles Metro Bus: 242
