= Sepulveda station =

Los Angeles Metro Busway station

Sepulveda
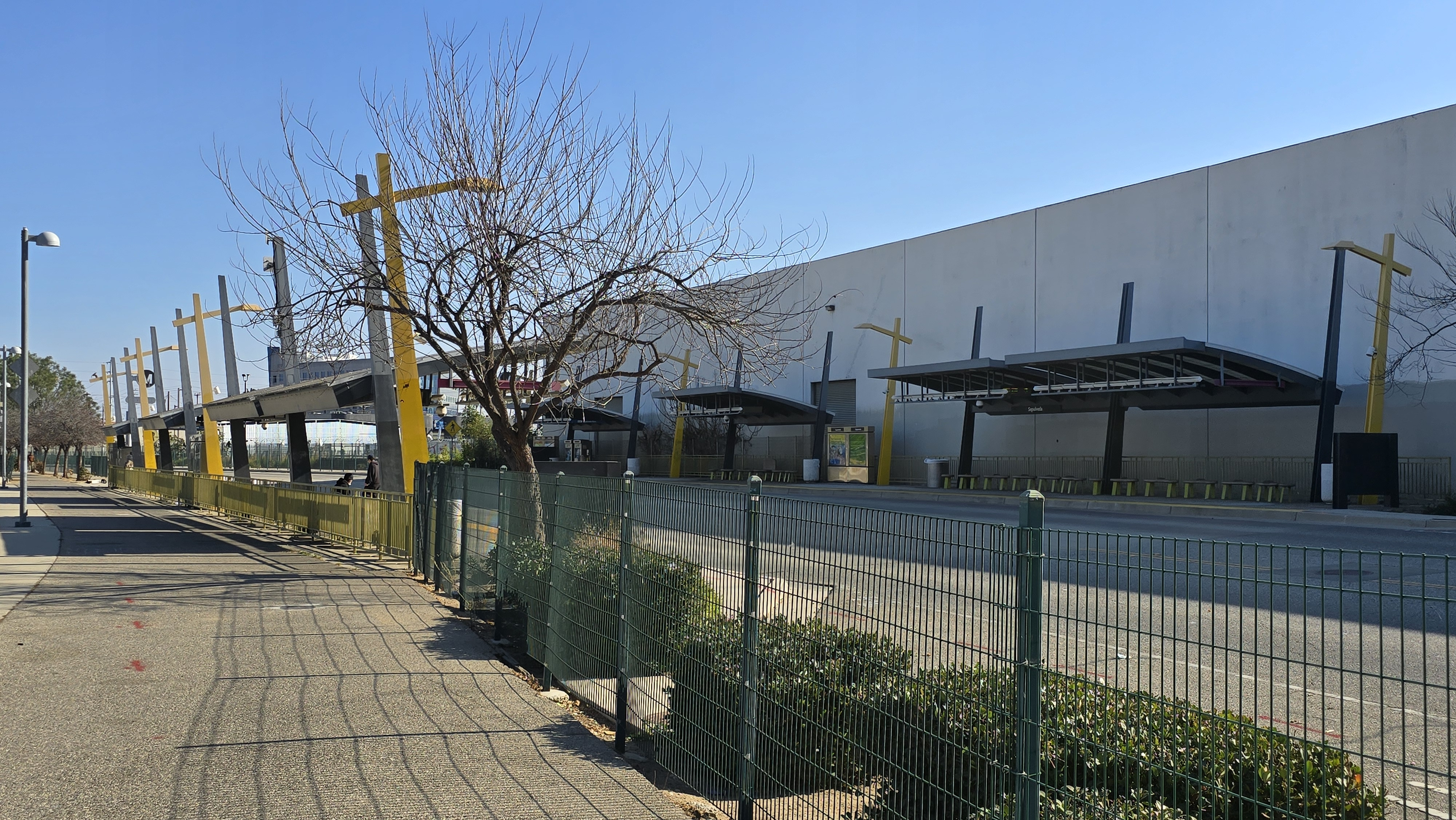
- The Sepulveda detour station as it appeared in September 2026, to be used until the completion of the viaduct of the G Line Improvement Project Sepulveda station as it appeared in January 2025, photographed from the G Line Bikeway

General information
- Location: 15430 & 15432 West Erwin Street; Los Angeles, California
- Coordinates: 34.1809°N 118.4688°W
- Owner: Los Angeles County Metropolitan Transportation Authority
- Platforms: 2 side platforms
- Connections: Los Angeles Metro Bus

Construction
- Parking: 260 spaces
- Cycle facilities: Racks and lockers
- Accessible: Yes

History
- Opened: October 29, 2005

Passengers
- FY 2026: 722 (avg. wkdy boardings)

Services
Preceding station	Metro Busway	Following station
Woodley toward Chatsworth	G Line	Van Nuys Detoured to Oxnard/Van Nuys toward North Hollywood
Location

Sepulveda station is a temporarily closed station on the G Line of the Los Angeles Metro Busway system. It is named after nearby Sepulveda Boulevard, which travels north-south and crosses the east-west busway route. The boulevard, in turn, is named for the Sepúlveda family of California. Unique among G Line stations, Sepulveda's platforms were not located at the cross street, but rather about a block west of it. The station is in the Van Nuys neighborhood of the City of Los Angeles, in the central San Fernando Valley.

Sepulveda station's stop has been moved to a temporary detour north of the station platforms, by Erwin Street, due to construction of the G Line Improvements Projects, with a viaduct to grade separate busses over Sepulveda Boulevard. The station is planned to reopen in December 2027, with the conclusion of construction.

== Property development ==
Various development proposals have been considered for the excess station parking and adjacent commercial parcels between Sepulveda Boulevard on the east, the transit station on the south, Interstate 405 on the west, and the Victory Park neighborhood to the north. A comprehensive study, including conceptual land usage strategies, was prepared for LA Metro by students of the UCLA Department of Urban Planning in mid-2010. Subsequently, conceptual development guidelines for the site were prepared by Metro.

Thus far, a development project including an LA Fitness is built on land formerly housing a Wickes Furniture building. Between December 2011 and February 2012, the former Wickes Furniture building was demolished for this project. By October 2012, the LADWP has put up new wooden and metal power poles along Sepulveda Blvd next to the project. The LA Fitness building was built and opened to the public in March 2013.

== Future development ==
Initially scheduled for fall 2019 or spring 2020, Metro announced their intent to grade separate the G Line over Sepulveda Boulevard. LADWP installed new power poles for undergrounding the existing power lines at the intersection before the construction of the bridge's framework. These plans were delayed due to lack of funds from Measure M. The grade separation viaduct began preliminary work between Woodman station and Sepulveda in 2025.

== Service ==
=== Hours and frequency ===
G Line buses run 24 hours a day. Buses operate every eight minutes during peak hours on weekdays. They operate every ten minutes during the daytime on weekdays and most of the day on weekends. Night service on all days is every 20 minutes.

=== Connections ===
As of January 19, 2025, the following connections are available:

- Los Angeles Metro Bus: 234

== Station artwork ==
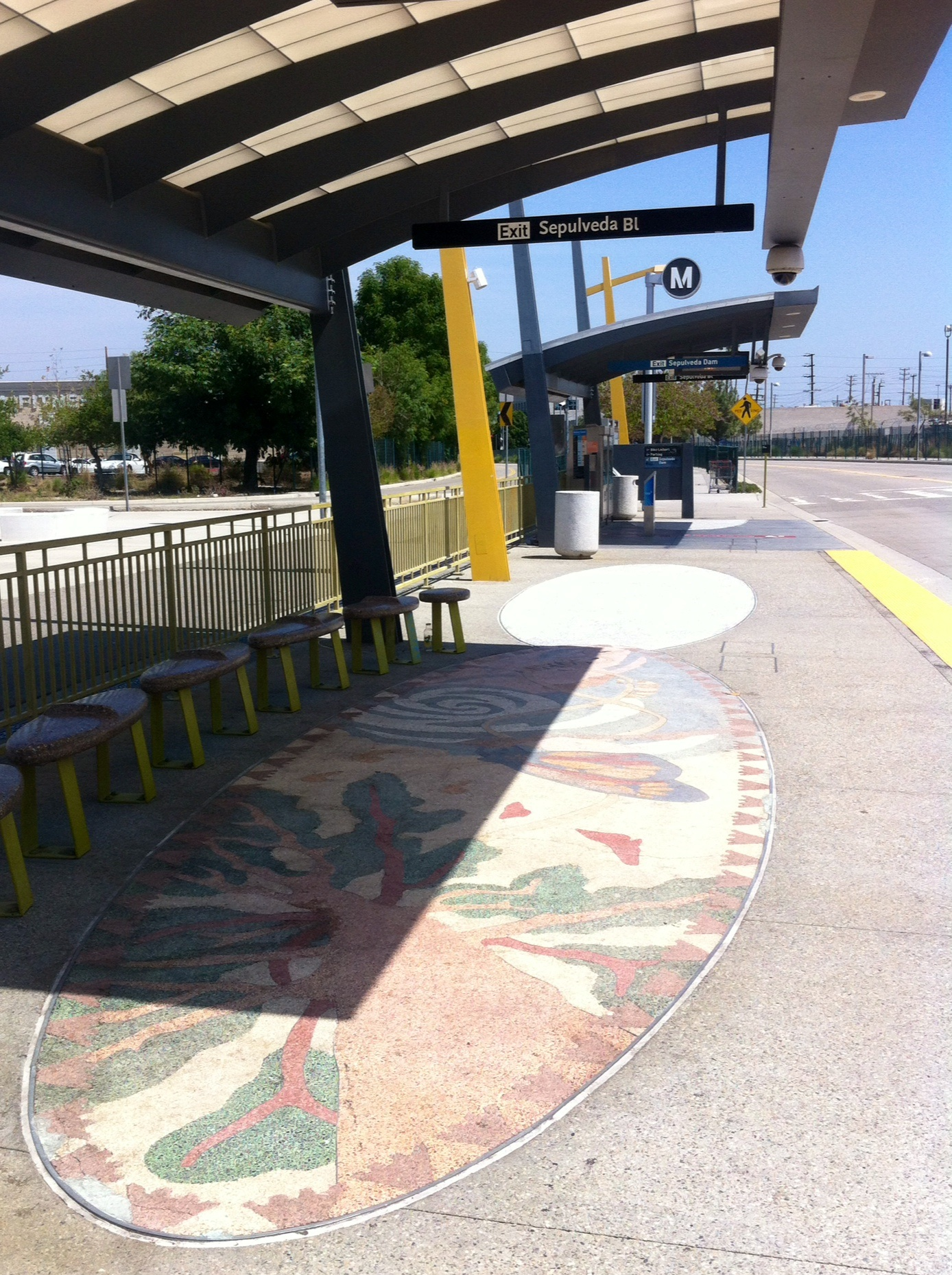
The entrance and floor mural of the station.

The platform features a painting that shows a pre-Columbian glyph and a map of the monarch butterfly's migratory path.
