= Balboa Boulevard =

Los Angeles roadway

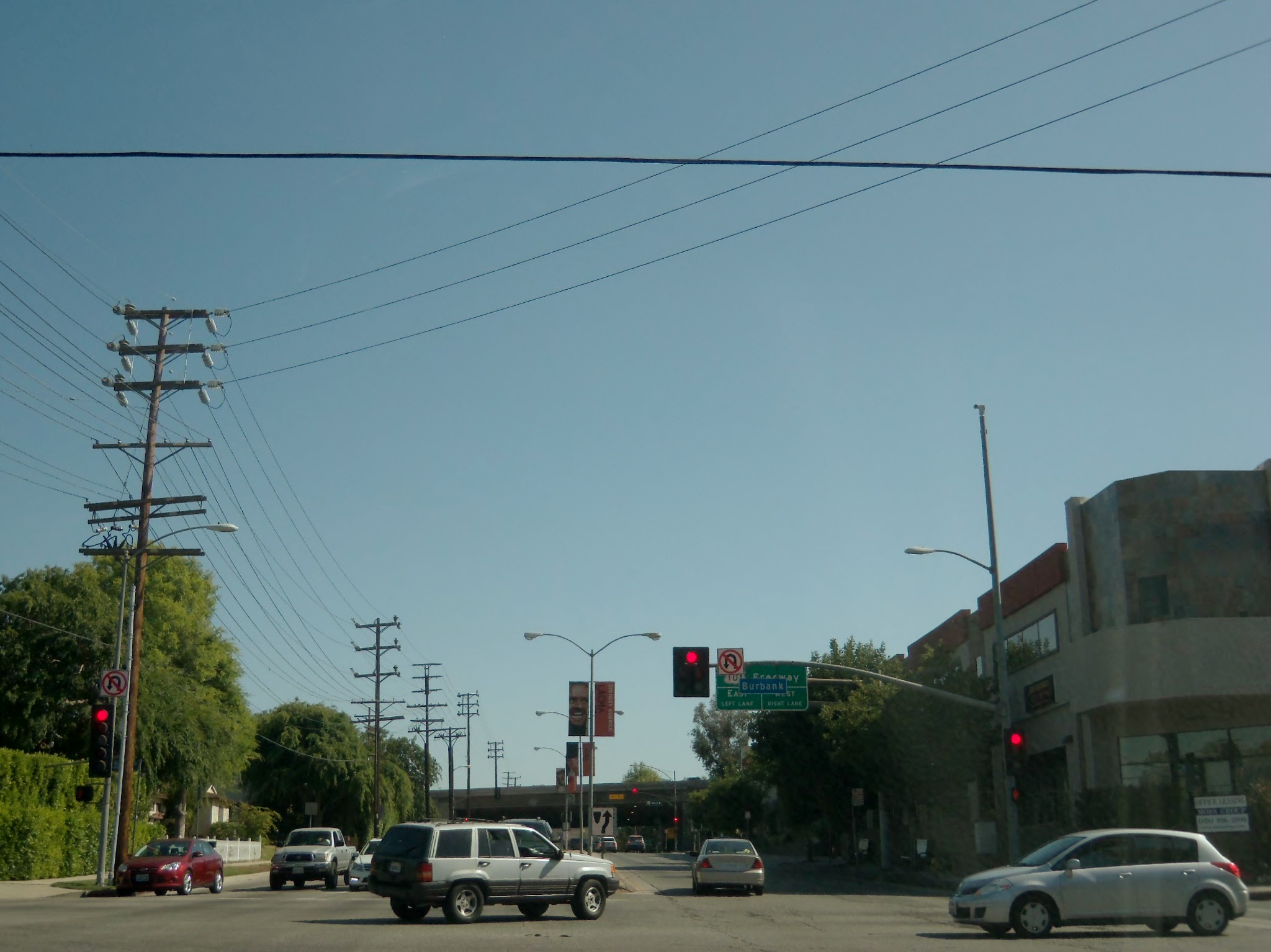
- Balboa Boulevard looking south near U.S. Route 101
- Interactive map of Balboa Boulevard
- Namesake: Vasco Núñez de Balboa
- Length: 12 mi (19 km)
- Nearest metro station: Balboa
- South end: Ventura Boulevard in Encino; 34.1593°N 118.5011°W
- Major junctions: SR 118 in Granada Hills; US 101 in Encino
- North end: Foothill Boulevard in Newhall Pass; 34.3193°N 118.4872°W

Balboa Boulevard is a major north–south arterial road in the city of Los Angeles; it cuts through many communities and is one of the main thoroughfares in the San Fernando Valley.

== Name ==
Balboa Boulevard was named after Vasco Núñez de Balboa, a Spanish explorer who with his crew was the first European to see the Pacific Ocean from the Americas. Several of the San Fernando Valley's north-south streets were originally named after historic explorers, including Balboa, De Soto, Alvarado, Cabrillo, Cortez, and Diaz, but Balboa Boulevard and De Soto Avenue are the only street names that remain.

== Route ==
The southern end of Balboa Boulevard starts at Ventura Boulevard in the Encino section of Los Angeles. From there, it passes under the Ventura Freeway (US 101), goes through a portion of the Sepulveda Dam Recreation Area, and runs through the communities of Lake Balboa, Van Nuys, Northridge, North Hills, and Granada Hills.

As Balboa Boulevard passes through Granada Hills, it passes over the Ronald Reagan Freeway (SR 118) before ending at Foothill Boulevard in the vicinity of the Newhall Pass interchange.

== Notable destinations ==
Notable destinations on Balboa Boulevard include (from south to north) Encino Chamber of Commerce, Children's Hospital Los Angeles outpatient specialty center, Sepulveda Dam Recreation Area, Lake Balboa Park, Valley Relics Museum, Knollwood Country Club, and Joseph Jensen Water Treatment Plant. The Cascades, an important part of the Los Angeles Aqueduct, is also located near Balboa's northern terminus.

Several schools are also located on Balboa Boulevard, including (from south to north) Birmingham High School, Daniel Pearl Magnet High School, Balboa Gifted/High-Ability Magnet Elementary School, and Valley Academy of Arts and Sciences.

== Transit ==
Metro Local lines 235 and 236 run along Balboa Boulevard. The G Line serves a station at its intersection with Victory Boulevard in Lake Balboa.
