= Woodley station (Los Angeles Metro) =

Metro station in Los Angeles, California

Woodley
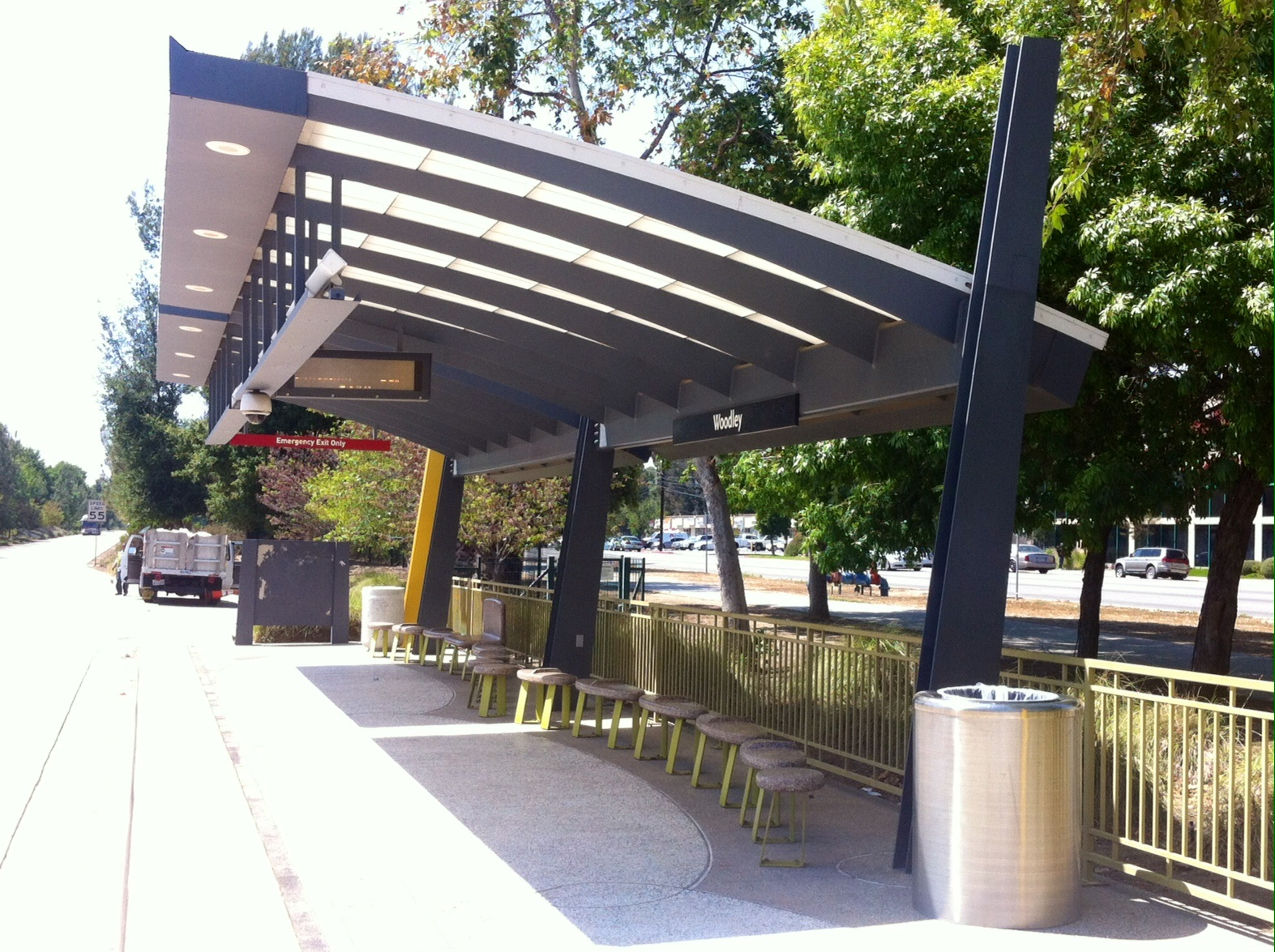
- Woodley station platform, 2015

General information
- Location: 6380-6381 North Woodley Avenue; Los Angeles, California
- Coordinates: 34.1862°N 118.4837°W
- Owner: Los Angeles County Metropolitan Transportation Authority
- Platforms: 2 side platforms
- Connections: Los Angeles Metro Bus

Construction
- Cycle facilities: Racks and lockers
- Accessible: Yes

History
- Opened: October 29, 2005

Passengers
- FY 2025: 332 (avg. wkdy boardings)

Services
Preceding station	Metro Busway	Following station
Balboa toward Chatsworth	G Line	Sepulveda toward North Hollywood
Location

Woodley station is a station on the G Line of the Los Angeles Metro Busway system. It is named after adjacent Woodley Avenue, which travels north–south and crosses the east–west busway route. The station is in the Van Nuys neighborhood of Los Angeles, in the San Fernando Valley. The station serves the Sepulveda Basin Recreation Area.

During the 2028 Summer Olympics, the station will serve spectators traveling to and from events at the Sepulveda Basin Recreation Area.

== Service ==
=== Hours and frequency ===
G Line buses run 24 hours a day. Buses operate every eight minutes during peak hours on weekdays. They operate every ten minutes during the daytime on weekdays and most of the day on weekends. Night service on all days is every 20 minutes.

=== Connections ===
As of January 19, 2025, the following connections are available:

- Los Angeles Metro Bus: 164, 237

== Notable places nearby ==
The station is within walking distance of the following notable places:

- Sepulveda Basin Recreation Area
- The Japanese Garden
- Woodley Park
