= Victory Boulevard =

Victory Boulevard may refer to:

- Victory Boulevard (Staten Island)
- Victory Boulevard (Los Angeles)
