= Sepulveda Dam =

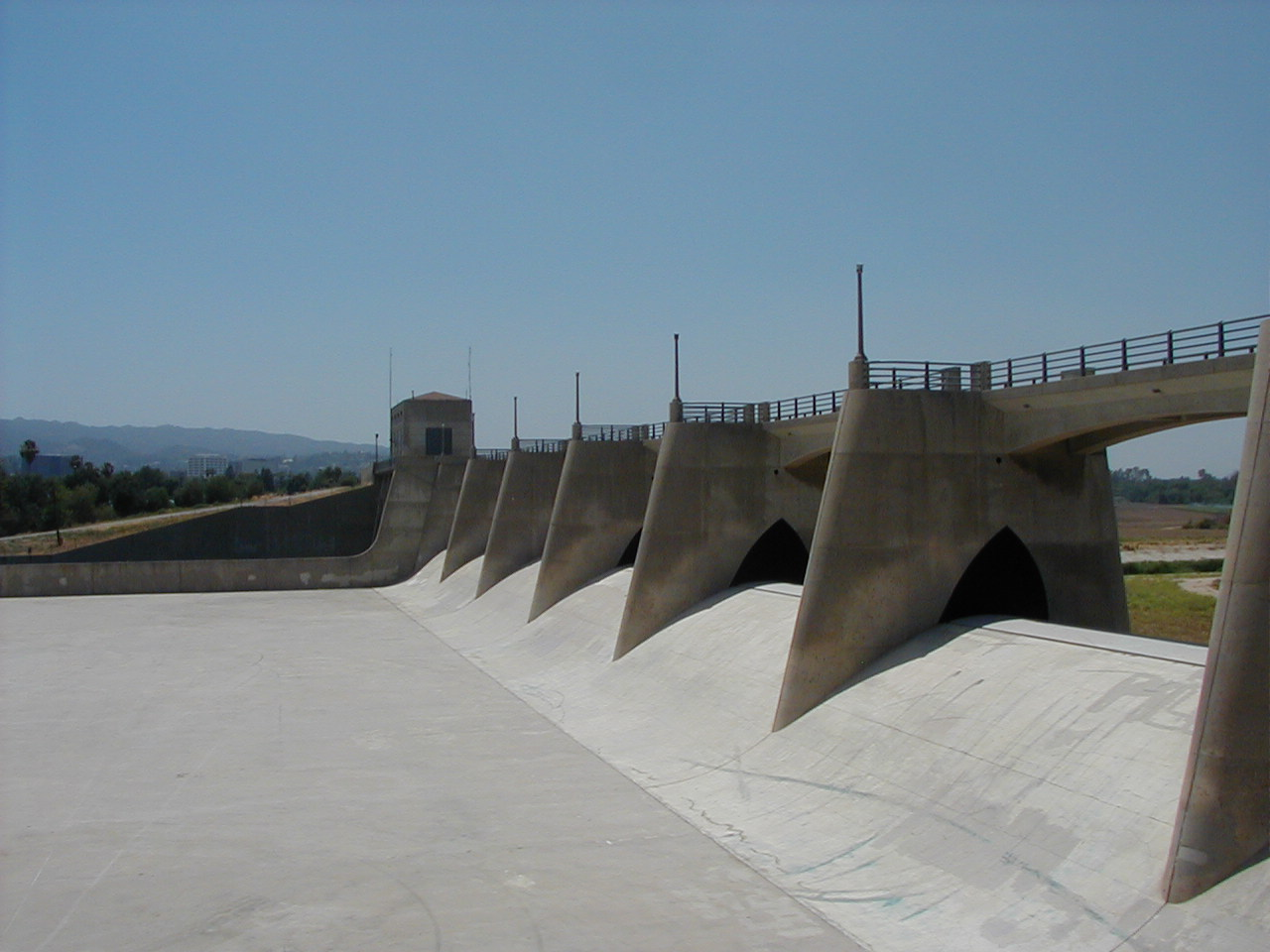

- Location in the San Fernando Valley
- Country: United States
- Location: San Fernando Valley, California
- Coordinates: 34.1671°N 118.4732°W
- Purpose: Flood control
- Status: Operational
- Construction began: 1940; 86 years ago
- Opening date: 1941; 85 years ago
- Construction cost: $6,650,561
- Owners: U.S. Army Corps of Engineers, Los Angeles District

Dam and spillways
- Impounds: Los Angeles River
- Height (thalweg): 57 feet (17 m)
- Length: 2.93 miles (4.72 km)
- Elevation at crest: 725 feet (221 m)
- Width (crest): 30 feet (9.1 m)
- Spillway type: Concrete ogee

Reservoir
- Total capacity: 17,300 acre⋅ft (21,300,000 m^{3})
- Website; Corps Lakes Gateway - Sepulveda Dam

The Sepulveda Dam is a dry dam constructed by the U.S. Army Corps of Engineers to withhold winter flood waters along the Los Angeles River. Completed in 1941, at a cost of $6,650,561 (equivalent to $145,575,000 in 2025), it is located south of center in the San Fernando Valley, approximately eight miles (13 km) east of the river's source in the western end of the Valley, in Los Angeles, California.

Sepulveda Dam, along with Hansen Dam located in the north San Fernando Valley, was constructed in response to the historic 1938 floods which killed 144 people. The dam's 17,300-acre-foot (21,300,000 m^{3}) capacity would allow it to hold back roughly 2 1/4 inches (57 mm) of runoff from the 141 square miles (370 km^{2}) of catchment upstream. It was placed at what was the then-current edge of the city. East of the dam, the river was crowded into a narrow channel by the city's growth. The Sepulveda Flood Control Basin is a large and undeveloped area in the center of the Valley, used mostly for wildlife refuge and recreation. After the 1938 Los Angeles River flood, the channelization of all the Valley's dry washes was created with dry, concrete-lined river bottoms. Currently these are being devolved in part as interconnecting bike paths.

Behind the dam, the Sepulveda Basin is home to several large recreation areas including Woodley Park, a model aircraft field, The Japanese Garden, a wildlife refuge, a water reclamation plant, and an armory. The facilities are compatible with occasional inundation from reservoir impoundment.

== History ==
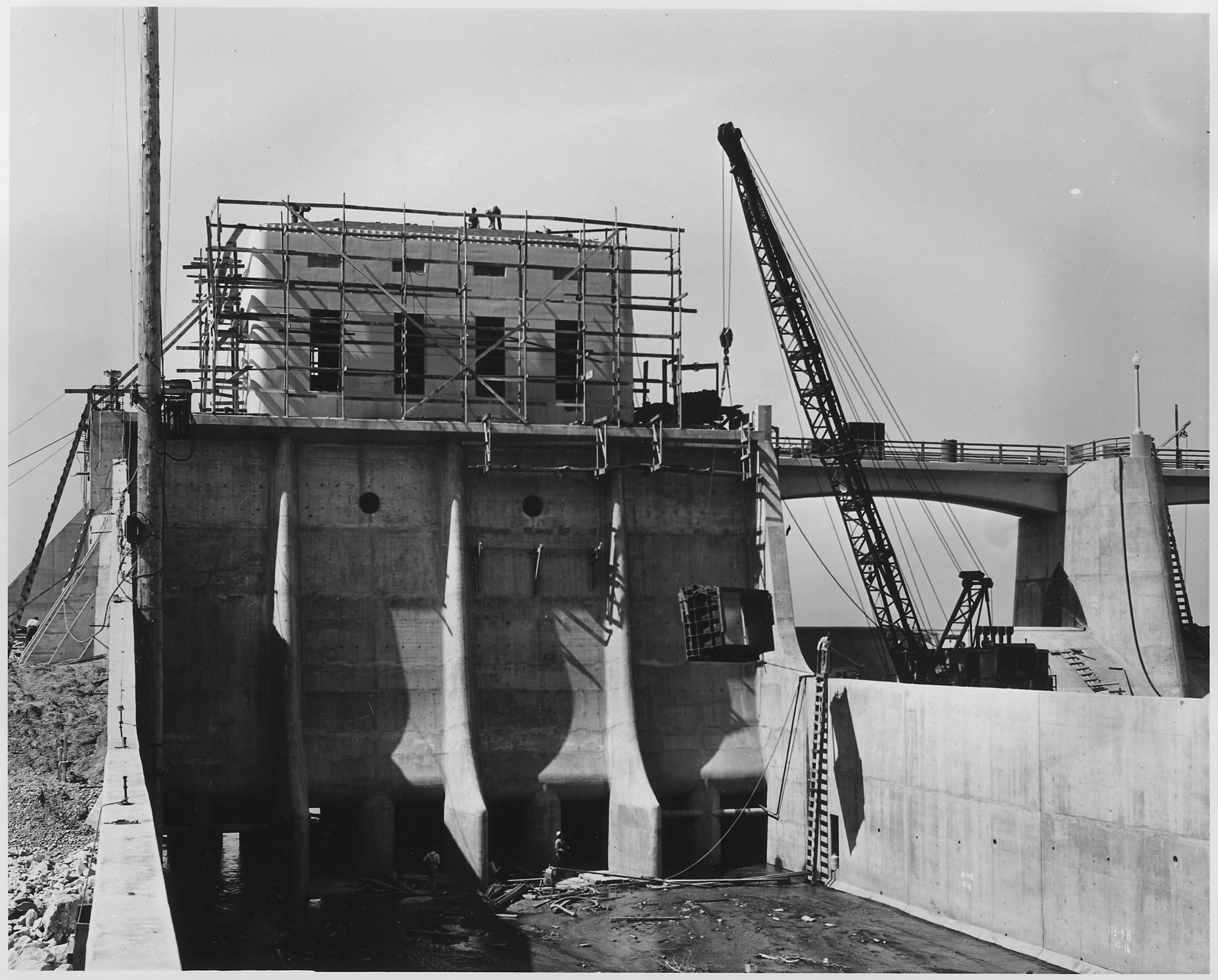
Looking upstream in the outlet channel. Form work has been stripped from the outlet control tower and service bridge and one of the outlet control slide gate frames is being lowered into position for installation.

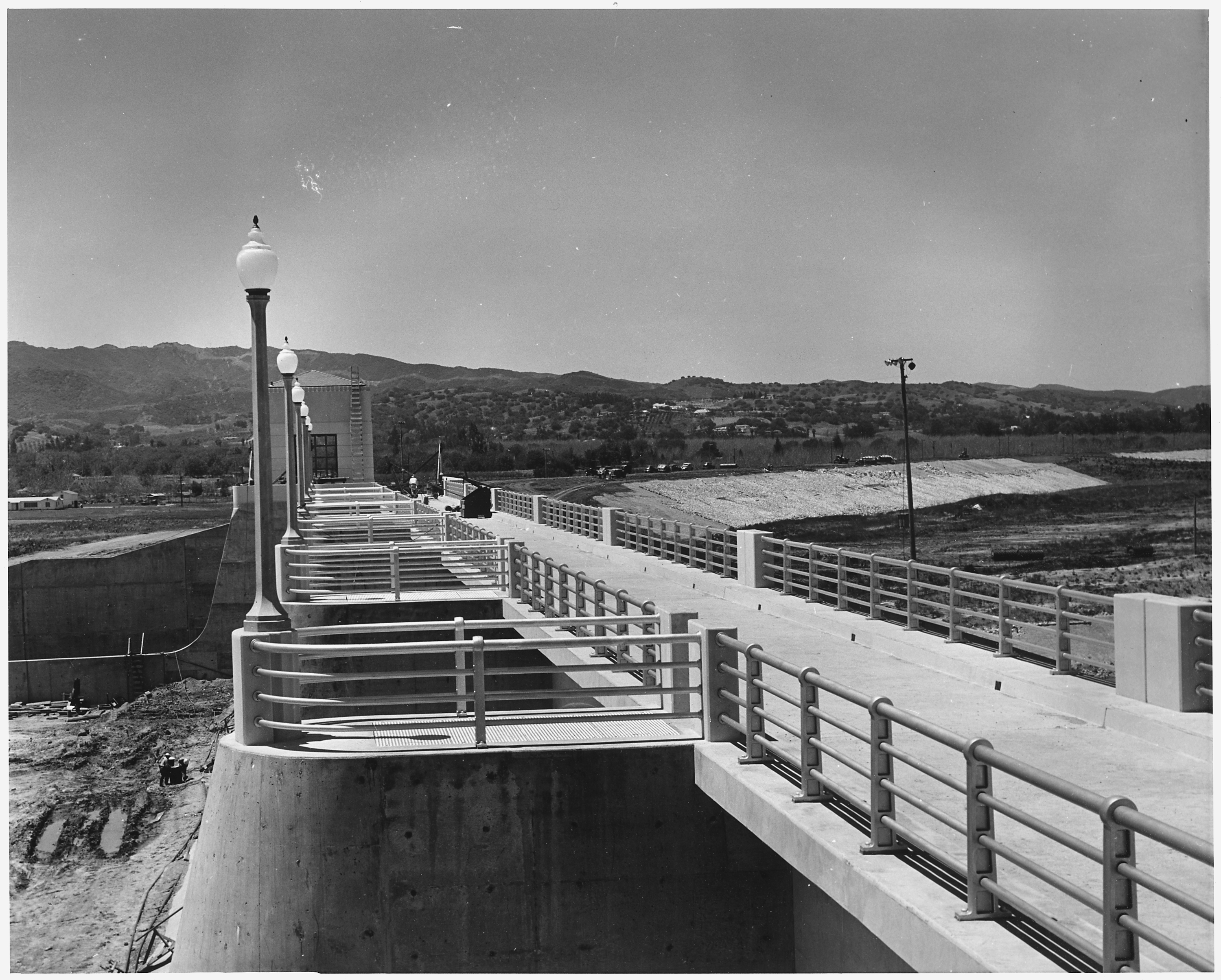
Westerly view along the top of the spillway showing the completed service bridge and handrails.

When the 1914 flood caused $10 million in damages to the developing basin areas, a public outcry began for action to address the recurring flooding problems. During the following year, the Los Angeles County Flood Control District was formed. Some of the early flood control efforts included smaller areas of channelization and the planning for needed reservoirs. Taxpayers approved bond issues in 1917 and 1924 to build the first major dams. However, they were not willing to provide enough funding for the much needed and substantial infrastructure downstream of these dams. After two more destructive floods in the 1930s, most notably the 1938 flood, federal assistance was requested. The Army Corps of Engineers took a lead role in channelizing the river and constructing several dams which would create flood control basins behind them. Channelization began in 1938, and by 1960 the project was completed to form the present 51-mile (82 km) engineered waterway. Included in this work were Hansen Dam, completed in 1940 and followed by Sepulveda Dam in 1941. In 1973, Burbank Boulevard was built through the Sepulveda Basin, and Woodley Ave was also built in the recreation area in 1975.

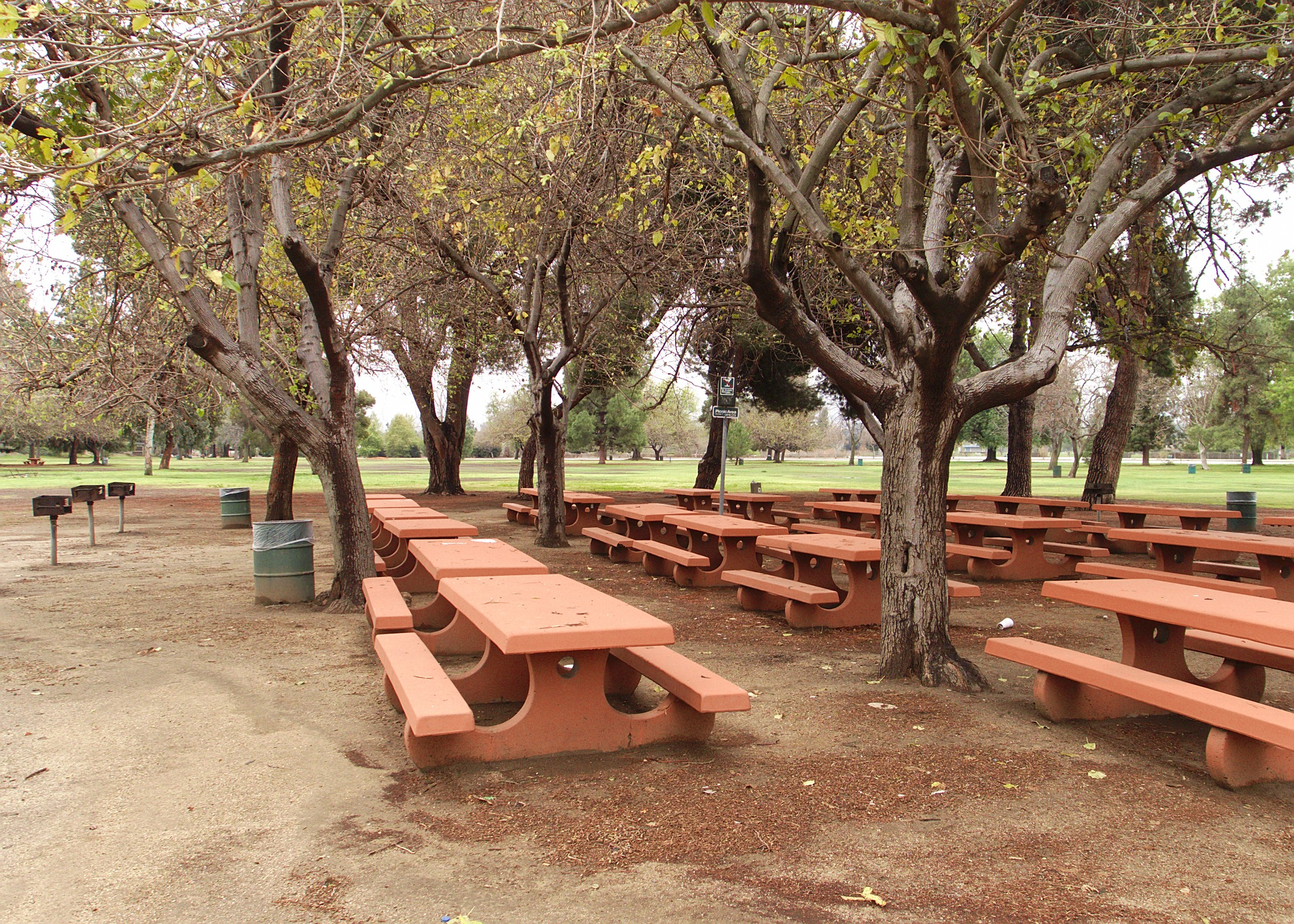
Woodley Park group picnic area.

== Access ==
Transit users can exit the G Line at either Balboa station or Woodley station.

== Sepulveda Basin Recreation Area ==
The 2,000-acre (810 ha) Sepulveda Basin Recreation Area is a flood control basin in Encino managed by the Los Angeles City Department of Recreation and Parks.

During the 2028 Summer Olympics, the area around the dam will host basketball (3x3), BMX racing/BMX freestyle, modern pentathlon, and skateboarding.

=== Woodley Park ===
Woodley Park is a large city park located on Woodley Avenue between Victory and Burbank Boulevards. The Leo Magnus Cricket Complex, a dog park, and group picnic areas are within the park. The park was opened in 1975.

The Japanese Garden is a 6.5-acre (2.6 ha) public Japanese garden located on the grounds of the Tillman Water Reclamation Plant adjacent to Woodley Park.

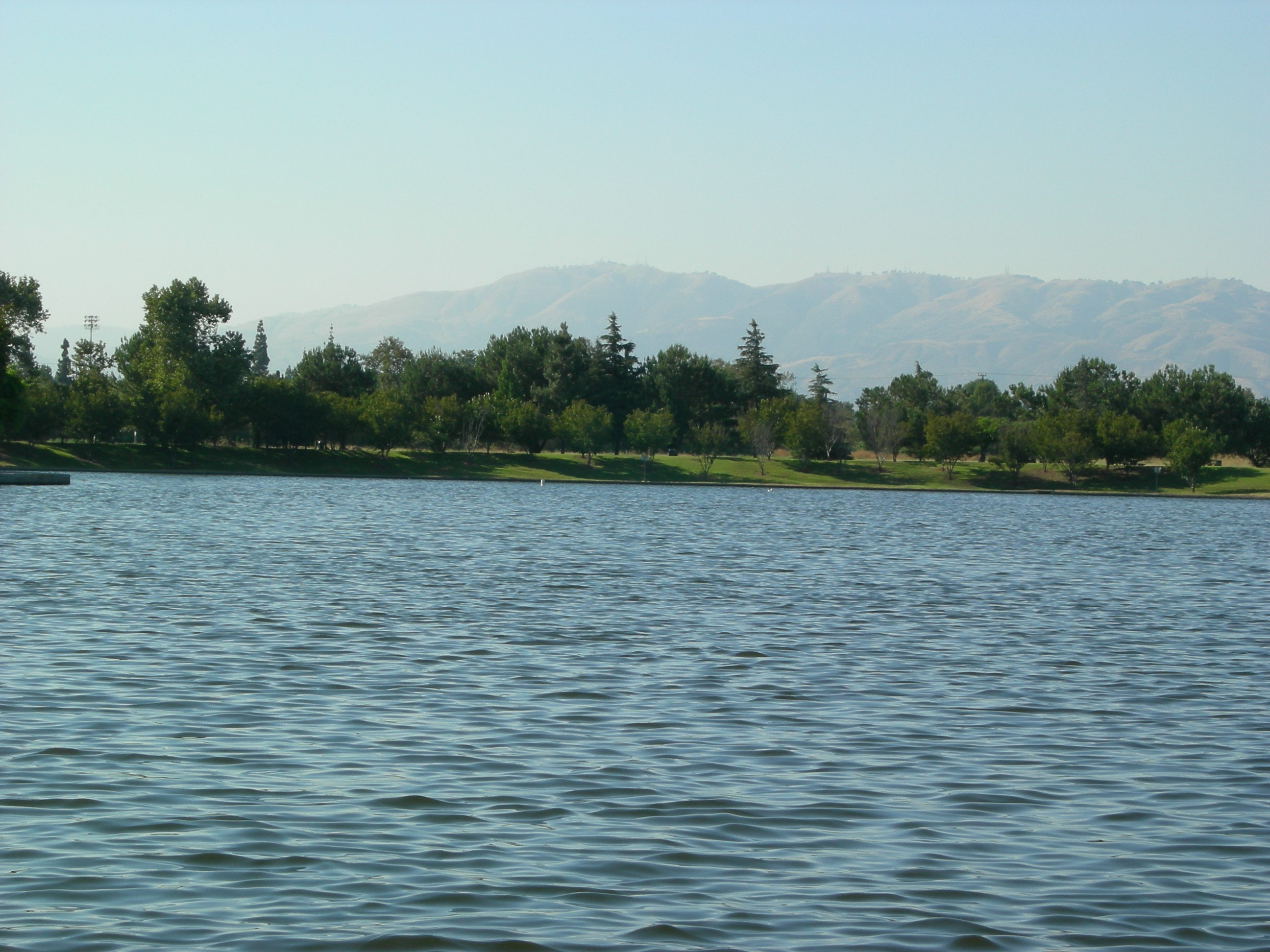
Lake Balboa Park.

=== Lake Balboa Park ===
Lake Balboa Park, also known as Anthony C. Beilenson Park, is an 80-acre (32 ha) park and water recreation facility with boat rentals and fishing. Lake Balboa is a 27-acre (11 ha) lake filled with water reclaimed from the Tillman Water Reclamation Plant. It also has barbecue pits, children's play area, picnic tables, and covered picnic pavilions. There are many Flowering cherry trees (Prunus serrulata 'Pink Cloud') in the park.

The Balboa Station on the G Line is located at the north end of the park, at Balboa Boulevard.

=== Sepulveda Basin Wildlife Reserve ===
The Sepulveda Basin Wildlife Reserve is at the southeast end of the Sepulveda Flood Control Basin and Recreation Area. It has two sections, the North Reserve and South Reserve, located north and south of Burbank Boulevard. Both have nature paths and hiking trails. Access and parking are in eastern Woodley Park near to the Tillman Water Reclamation Plant, or from Burbank Boulevard east of Woodley Avenue.

Haskell Creek flows through the nature preserve, and there are several wildlife ponds. Over 200 species of birds have been seen in the basin. Many, attracted by the water, gather here during fall and spring migrations. The Sepulveda Basin Wildlife Reserve is an ongoing habitat restoration project, with locally native California plants. Native trees include Fremont's cottonwood (Populus fremontii), Coast live oak (Quercus agrifolia ), Valley Oak (Quercus lobata), California Black Walnut (Juglans californica), and California sycamore (Platanus racemosa).

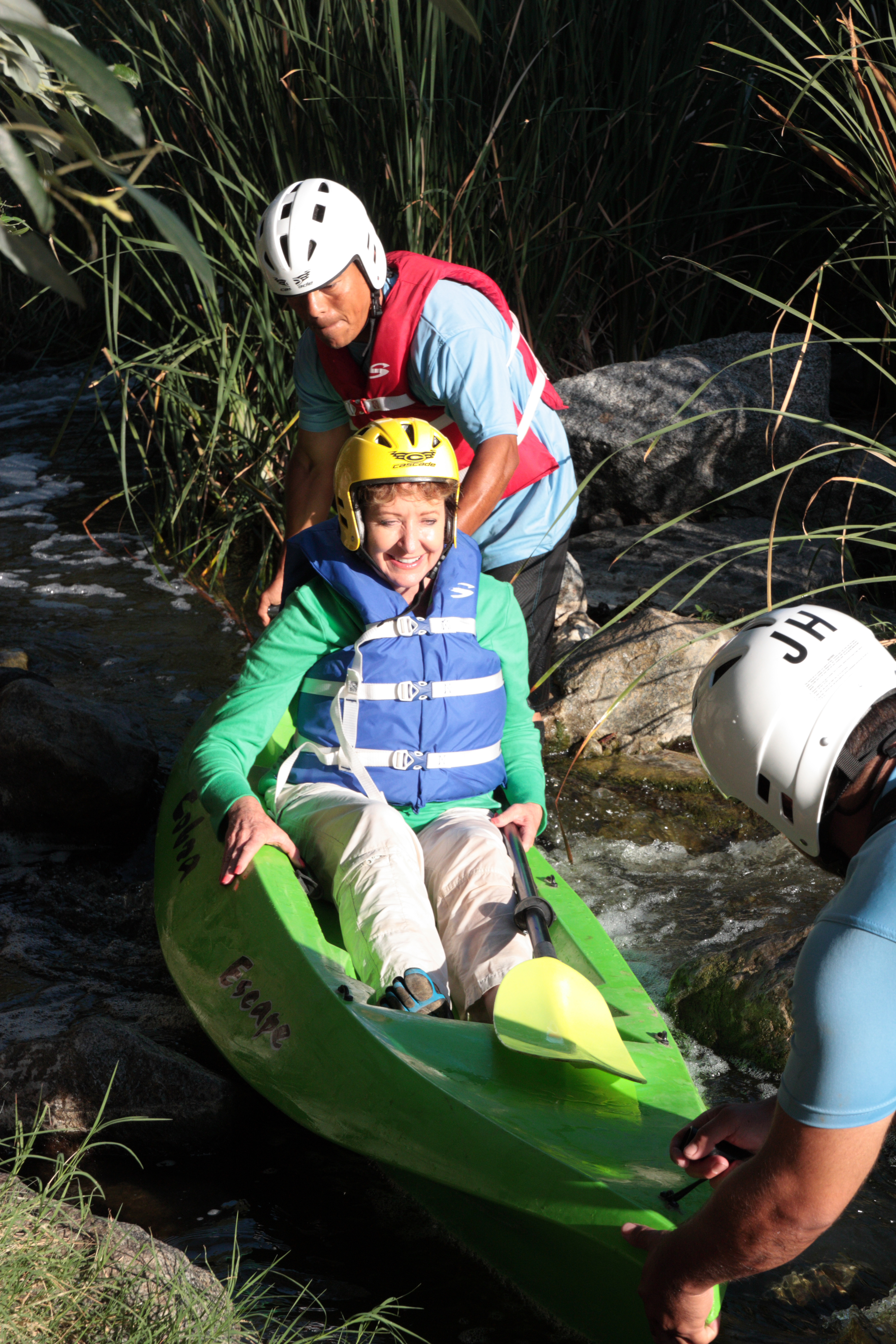
Sepulveda Basin River Recreation Zone.

=== Sepulveda Dam Recreation Area Bike Path ===
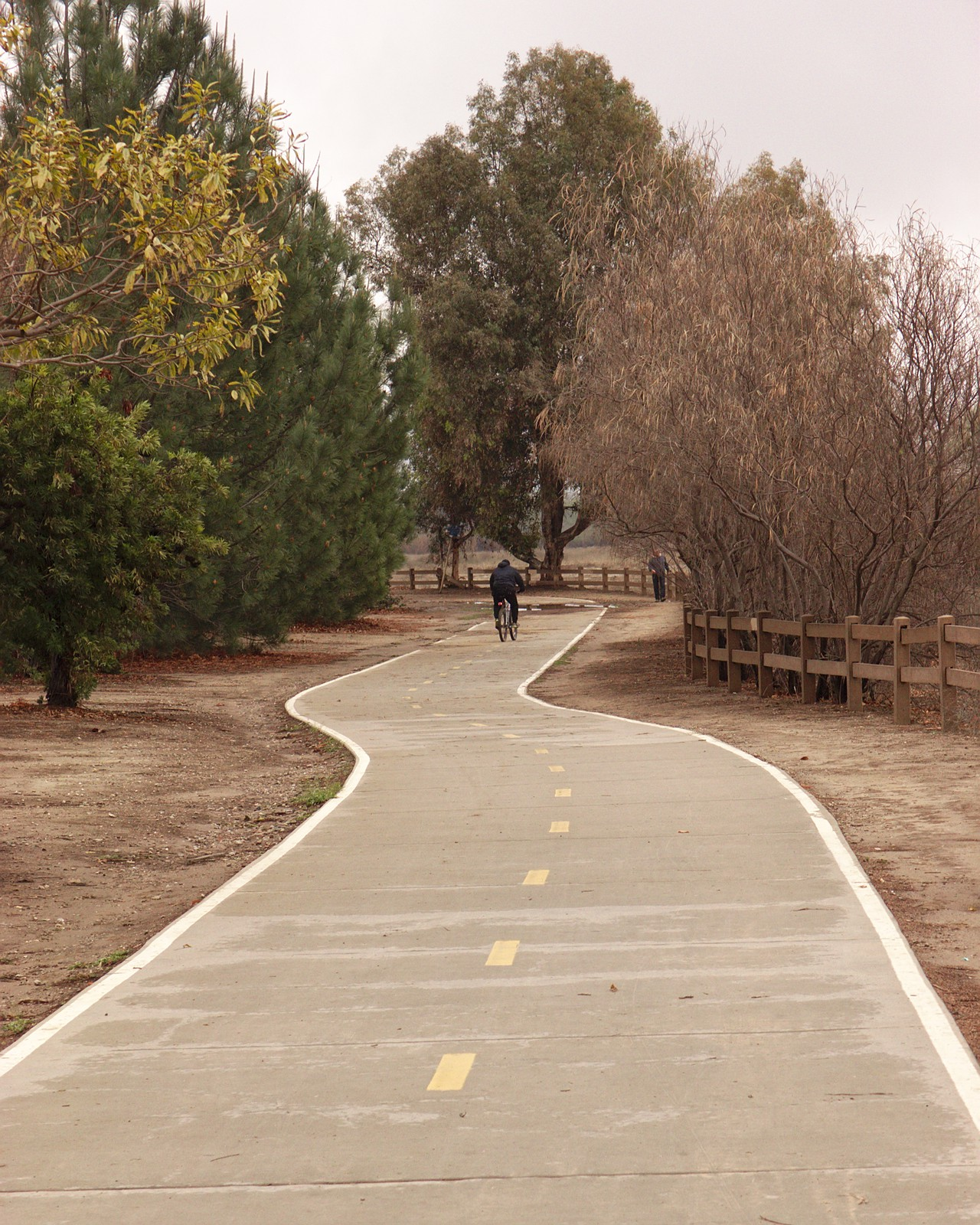
Sepulveda Dam Recreation Area Bike Path

The Sepulveda Dam Recreation Area Bike Path is a 9-mile (14 km) bicycle path route looping around the recreation area. This bike path runs from Victory Boulevard near the San Diego Freeway (I-405), westward to White Oak Avenue, south on White Oak to Burbank Boulevard, east on Burbank to Woodley Boulevard, and north on Woodley returning to Victory Boulevard. Public access is continuous along it. The ride features no steep or sustained hills, and has a maximum grade of no more than 2%.

A shorter route heads south on Balboa Boulevard, which crosses a natural stretch of the Los Angeles River that lined with native Arroyo willows, California sycamores, and other California native plants.

The bikeway "cruises around the Balboa Sports Center and several golf courses, and has several open areas with spectacular views of into the mountains to the north and east."

The loop sections along Victory and Burbank can be frequented by joggers. The bike path can seasonally have burr-bearing weeds, which may cause flats in less durable tires. The Apollo II Model Airplane Field is visible from the path.

There is ample free parking available in the public park, sports field, and/or golf course parking lots on Burbank, Woodley and Balboa Boulevards.

"Not all of [the park’s bike paths] show up on the official city Rec and Parks map or Google maps. The bike paths connect to play areas along Lake Balboa, several bathrooms, natural areas (including a natural soft-bottom stretch of the L.A. River), and to the cross-valley Orange Line bike path."

To access the park from the Orange Bikeway start at Victory Boulevard and Balboa Boulevard, go south, then turn east on a bike way.

The Sepulveda Basin bike paths are accessible from Granada Hills via the 6.5-mile (10.5 km) Class III path on Woodley Ave.

=== Sepulveda Basin River Recreation Zone ===
The Sepulveda Basin River Recreation Zone extends from above Balboa Boulevard to the confluence of Haskell Creek below Burbank Boulevard. It is open for recreational non-motorized boating during the summer, with restricted access to some protected wildlife areas along the banks.

=== Other facilities ===
Other recreation facilities within the Sepulveda Dam Recreation Area include:

- Balboa Sports Complex, with a children's play area, community room, indoor gym; and lighted: baseball diamonds, basketball courts, soccer fields, football field, handball courts, tennis courts, and volleyball courts.
- Hjelte Sports Center, with softball diamonds.
- Sepulveda Garden Center, a community garden with 800 garden plots on 20 acres (8.1 ha), and public activity center building.
- Sherman Oaks Castle Park, with miniature golf, an arcade, and batting cages.
- Encino Golf Course, Balboa Golf Course, and Woodley Lakes Golf Course (all 18-hole).
- Apollo XI Field for model airplanes.

== See also ==
- Los Encinos State Historic Park
- List of parks in Los Angeles
