= Balboa station =

Rapid-transit bus stop in San Fernando Valley, Los Angeles, California

Balboa
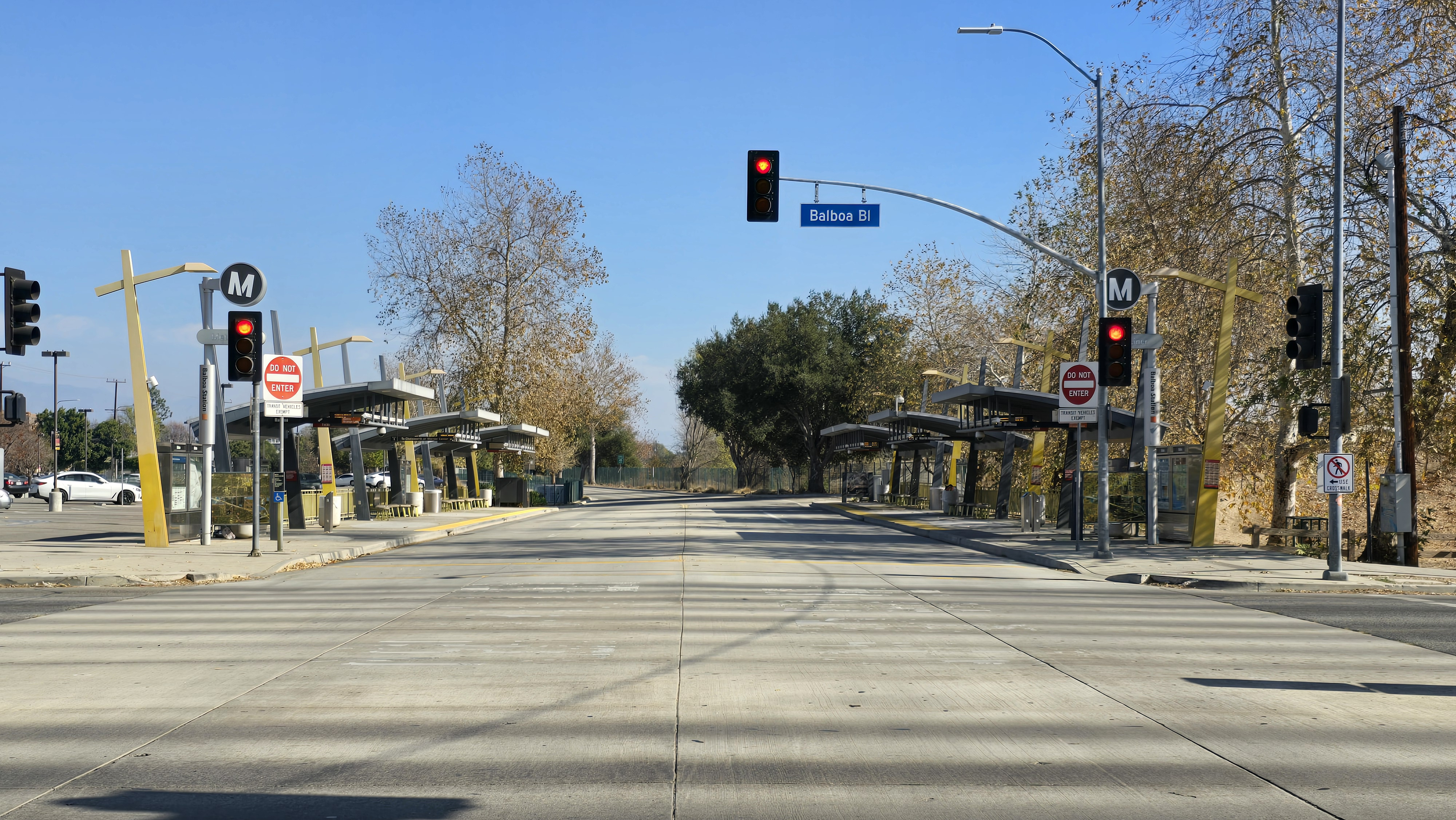
- Balboa station in 2025

General information
- Location: 6338 & 6340 North Balboa Boulevard; Los Angeles, California
- Coordinates: 34.1859°N 118.5011°W
- Owner: Los Angeles County Metropolitan Transportation Authority
- Platforms: 2 side platforms
- Connections: Los Angeles Metro Bus; LADOT Commuter Express

Construction
- Parking: 273 spaces
- Cycle facilities: Racks and lockers
- Accessible: Yes

History
- Opened: October 29, 2005

Passengers
- FY 2025: 596 (avg. wkdy boardings)

Services
Preceding station	Metro Busway	Following station
Reseda toward Chatsworth	G Line	Woodley toward North Hollywood
Location

Balboa station is a station on the G Line of the Los Angeles Metro Busway system. It is named after adjacent Balboa Boulevard, which travels north–south and crosses the east–west transitway route. The station is in the Lake Balboa district of Los Angeles, in the central San Fernando Valley. The station serves the Sepulveda Basin Recreation Area.

During the 2028 Summer Olympics, the station will serve spectators traveling to and from events at the Sepulveda Basin Recreation Area.

== Service ==
=== Hours and frequency ===
G Line buses run 24 hours a day. Buses operate every eight minutes during peak hours on weekdays. They operate every ten minutes during the daytime on weekdays and most of the day on weekends. Night service on all days is every 20 minutes.

=== Connections ===
As of January 19, 2025, the following connections are available:

- LADOT Commuter Express: 573, 574
- Los Angeles Metro Bus: 164, 235, 236

== Nearby destinations ==
The station is within walking distance of the following notable places:

- Birmingham High School
- Daniel Pearl Magnet High School
- Lake Balboa Park
- Sepulveda Basin Recreation Area
- G Line, Los Angeles River and Victory Boulevard bicycle paths
