= The Japanese Garden =

Japanese garden in Los Angeles

- Japanese: 水芳園, romanized: Suihō-en
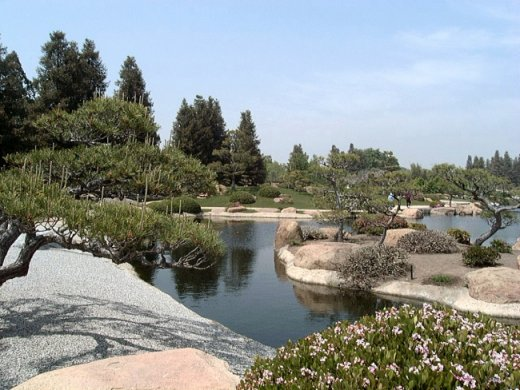
- View of The Japanese Garden.

- Location within the Los Angeles metropolitan area Location within California Location within the United States
- Type: Botanical garden
- Location: Lake Balboa, California
- Coordinates: 34.1837°N 118.4808°W
- Area: 6.5 acres (2.6 ha)
- Opened: 1980
- Website: thejapanesegarden.com

The Japanese Garden is a 6.5-acre (2.6 ha) public Japanese garden in Los Angeles, located in the Lake Balboa district in the central San Fernando Valley, adjacent to the Van Nuys and Encino neighborhoods. It is specifically on the grounds of the Tillman Water Reclamation Plant adjacent to Woodley Park, in the Sepulveda Basin Recreation Area.

The garden's Japanese name is Suihō-en (水芳園) meaning "garden of water and fragrance." The idea of having a Japanese Garden adjacent to a water reclamation plant was conceived by Donald C. Tillman. The garden's purpose was to demonstrate a positive use of reclaimed water, in what is usually considered a delicate environment, a Japanese garden. The ponds and irrigation use reclaimed water from the adjacent water reclamation plant.

== Design ==
The gardens were designed by Koichi Kawana and created from 1980 to 1983. Their formal dedication was on June 14, 1984. The Japanese Garden has been ranked 10th out of 300 public Japanese gardens in the United States by the Journal of Japanese Gardening.

As one first enters The Japanese Garden, one walks through a dry Zen meditation garden (Karesansui) containing a large grass-covered mound, representing Tortoise Island, a symbol of longevity, and a Three Buddhas (Trikaya) arrangement of stones. Next comes an expansive chisen, or "wet strolling" garden with waterfalls, lakes, trees, and stone lanterns. At path's end is the Shoin Building with an authentic 4½ tatami (7 m^{2}) tea house and adjacent tea garden.

== Film and television ==
The gardens and adjacent facilities have been used as scenery in many films and television series, particularly low-budget science-fiction and action films. In the 1990s, Los Angeles mayor Richard Riordan mandated that city facilities be made available at much lower cost than similar locations to benefit the entertainment industry in Los Angeles. Productions filmed at the garden include Star Trek: The Next Generation, where it stood for various planets and locations on Earth, including Starfleet Academy. The Shoin building was also used as the spa in the 2003 film Bruce Almighty.

== Gallery ==
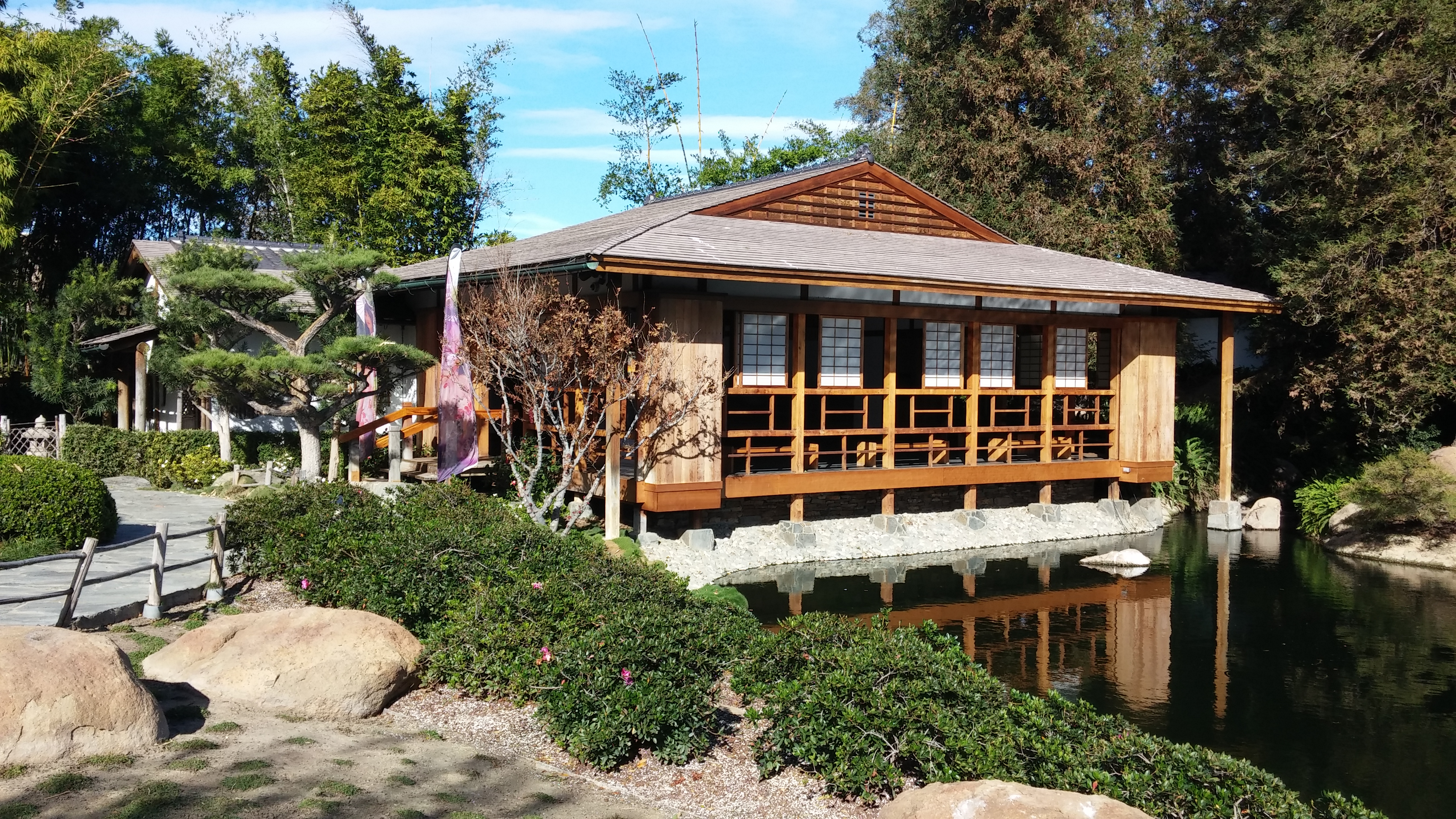
The Shoin building, which adjoins the tea house

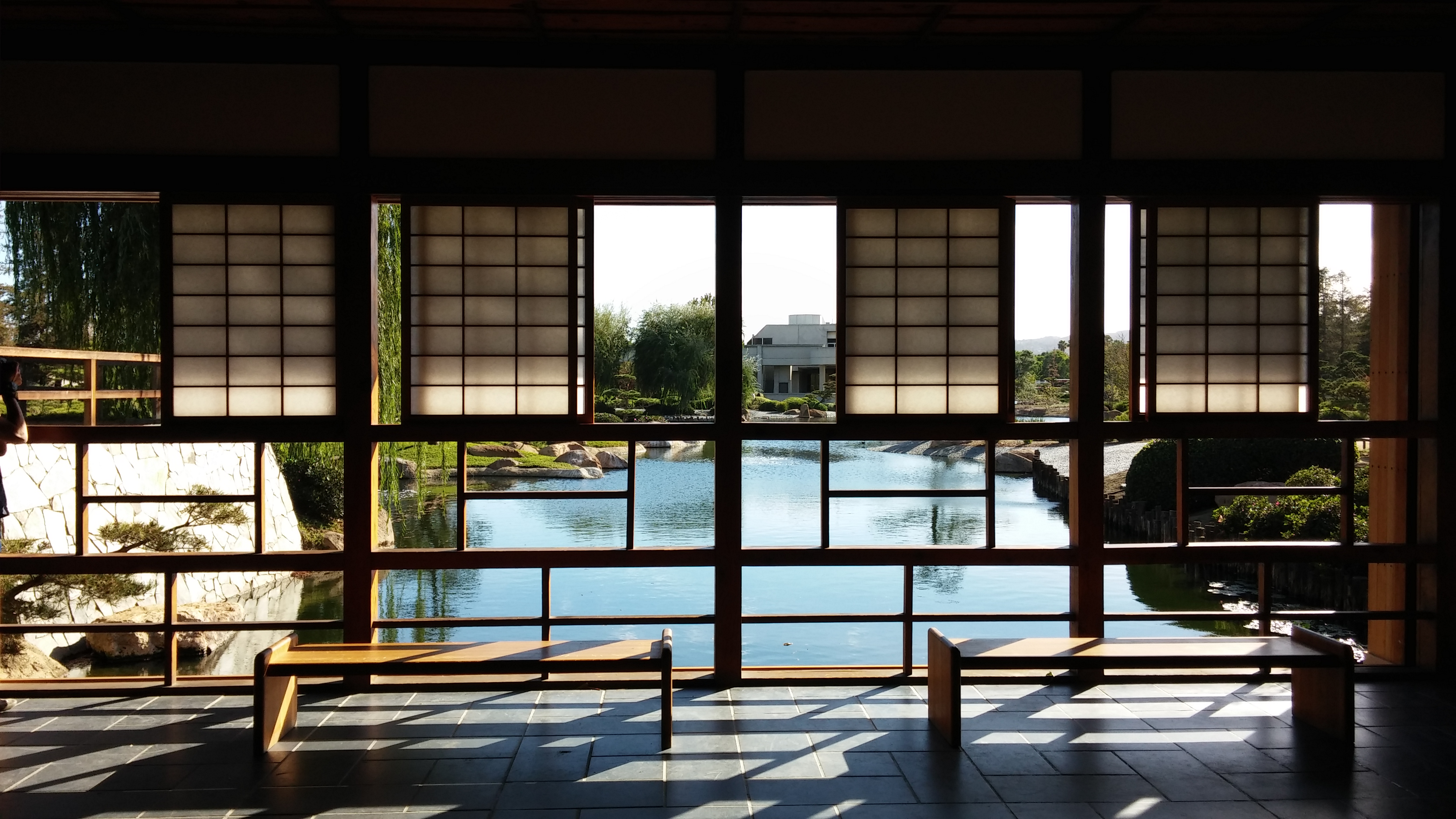

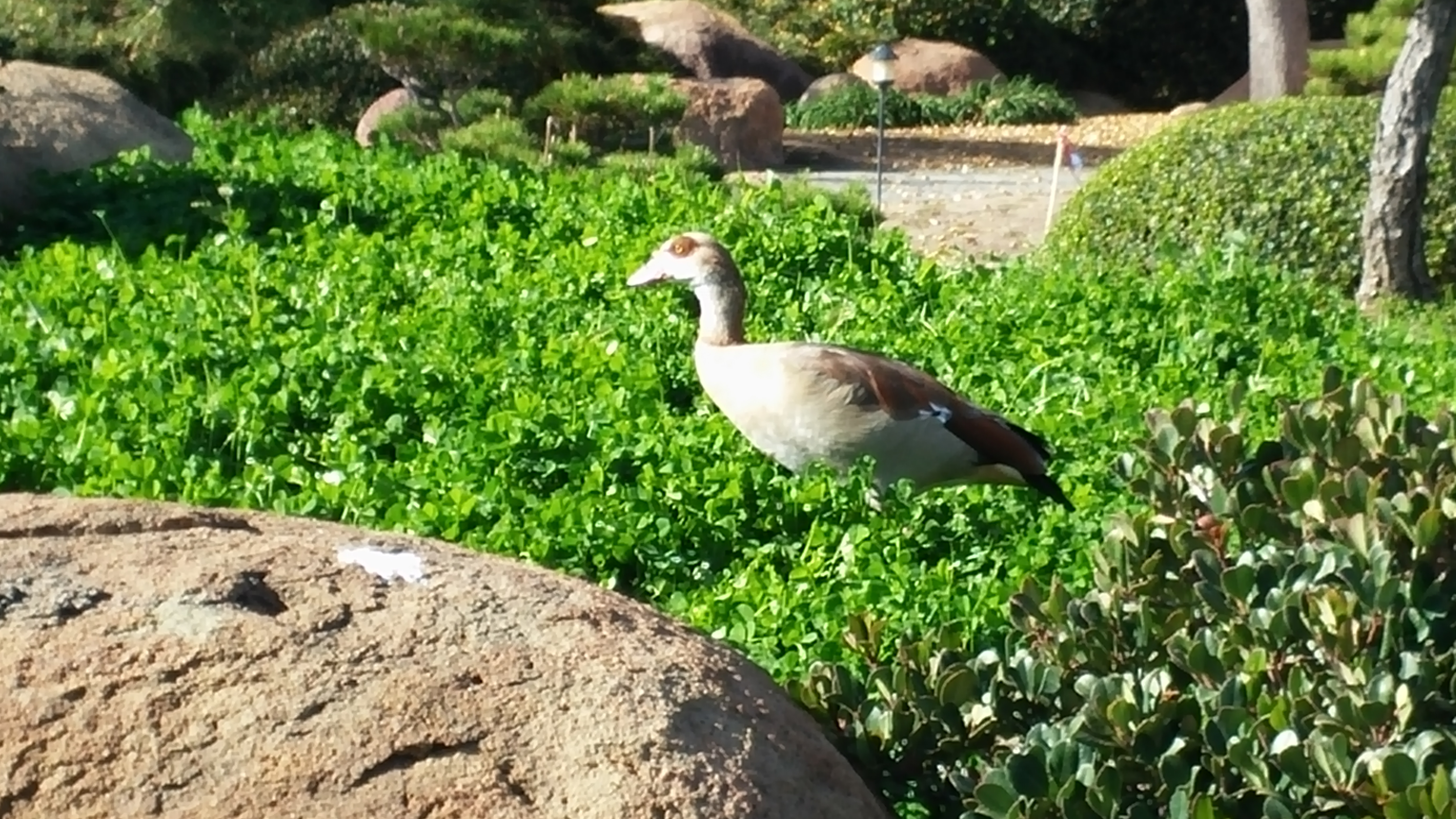

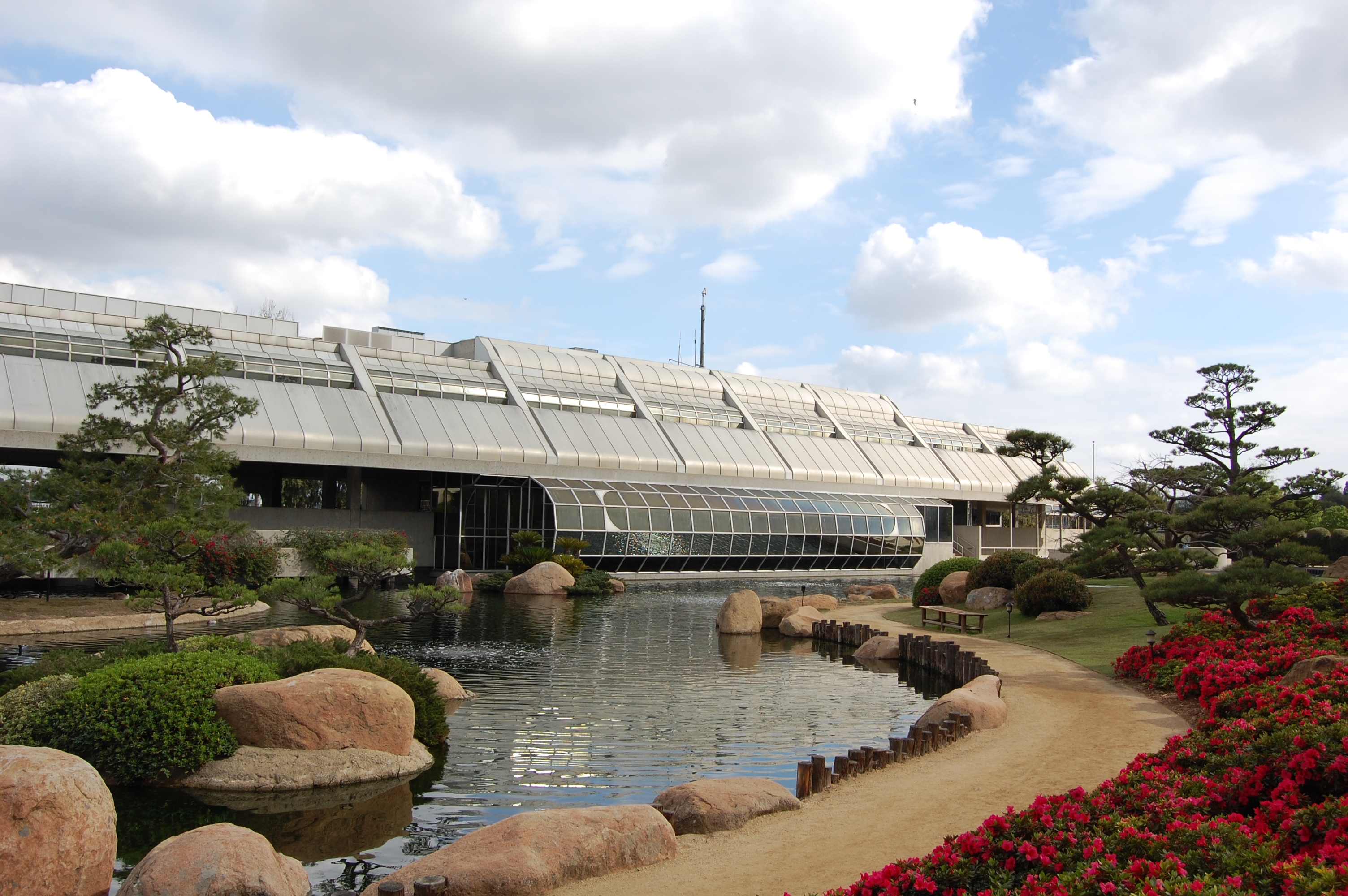
Garden path, pond, and administrative building of the Tillman Water Reclamation Plant

== See also ==
- Gardens in California
- Japanese gardens in the United States
- Parks in the San Fernando Valley
