= Woodley Park (Los Angeles) =

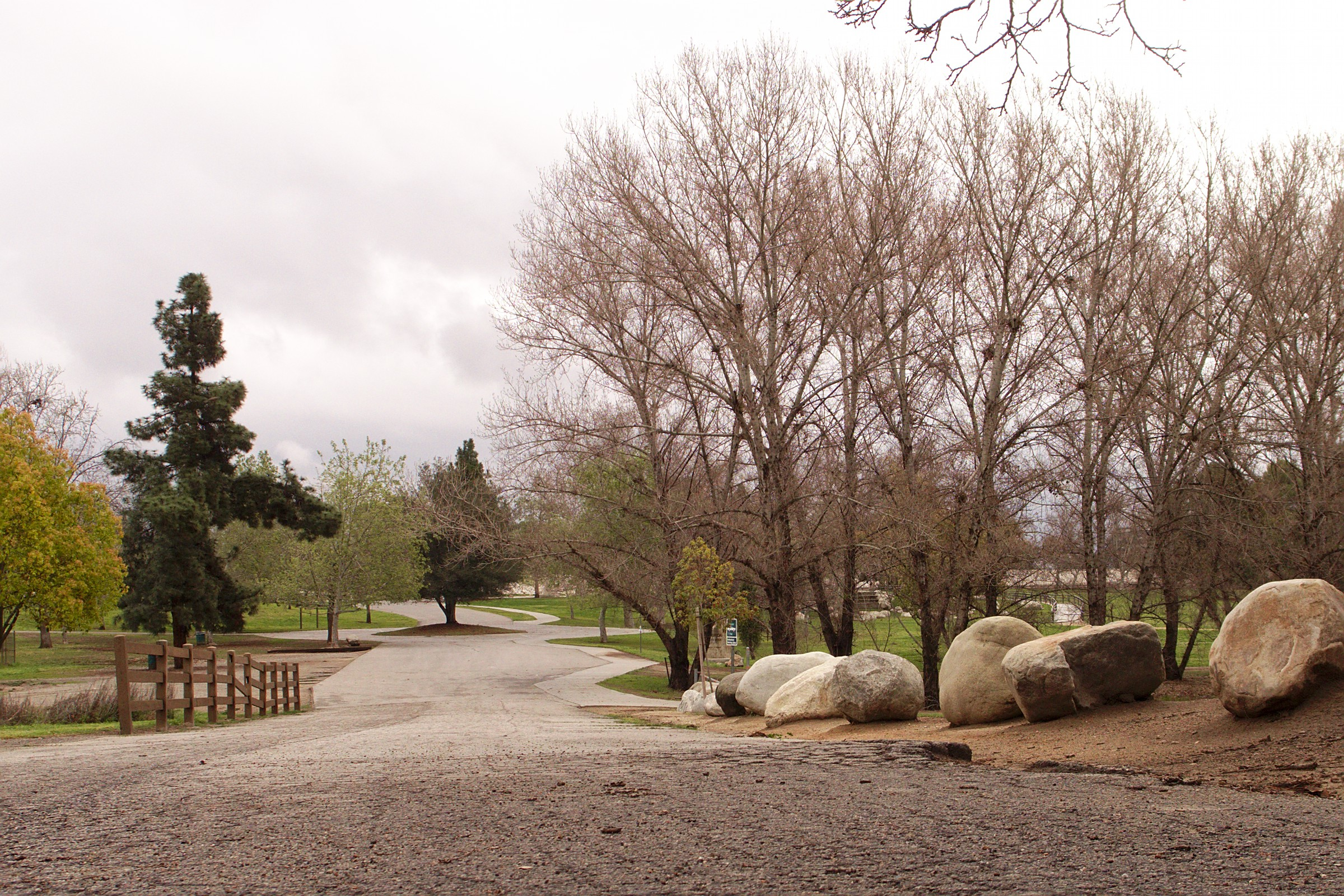

- Location within San Fernando Valley
- Location: San Fernando Valley, California, U.S.
- Coordinates: 34°10′46″N 118°28′44″W
- Operator: City of Los Angeles

Woodley Park is a recreation area managed by the City of Los Angeles and located along Woodley Avenue between Victory and Burbank Boulevards in the Lake Balboa neighborhood of Los Angeles, California. The area is located within the large Sepulveda Basin Recreation Area in the central San Fernando Valley.

The Tillman Water Reclamation Plant is adjacent to the park and surrounded by The Japanese Garden, a large Japanese garden open to the public.

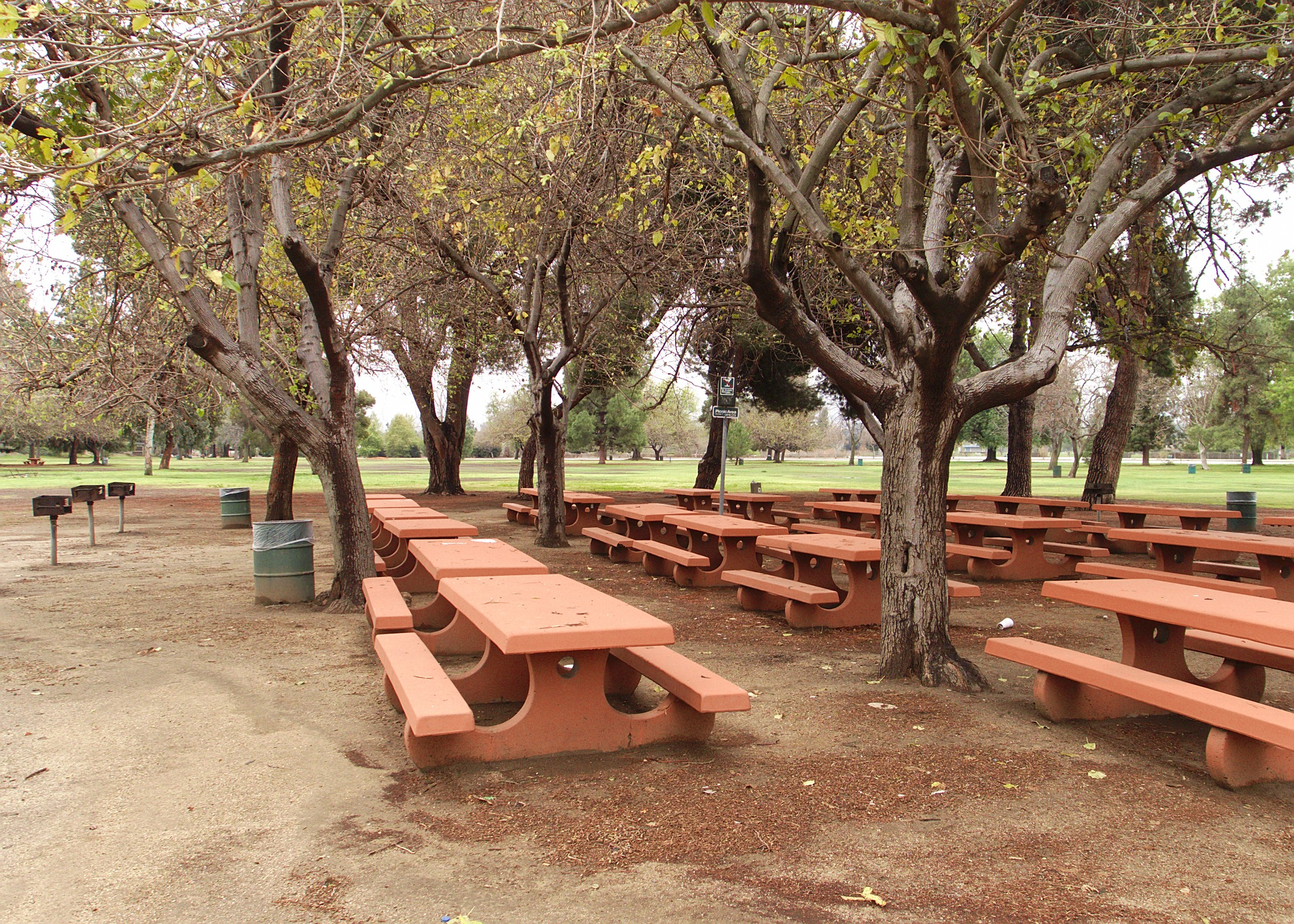
Picnic area in Woodley Park.

== Recreation ==
- Picnic areas
- Archery club and archer training grounds, some who have become world and Olympic champions in the late 1990s and early 2000s

=== Cricket ===
Woodley Park has five cricket grounds in the Leo Magnus Cricket Complex, and draws many of the best cricket players in the Los Angeles area.

On many weekends, Woodley Park hosts a number of games of cricket being played by expats of Britain and Commonwealth counties, and British influenced countries, including India, Pakistan, Sri Lanka, Australia, South Africa, New Zealand, and the Caribbean.

The 1995 and 2002 U.S. national cricket championships were held at the park.

=== Events ===
Events in Woodley Park can/have included:

- Classic car shows.
- Bagpiping troupe weekly practice, in the late 1980s.
- Boy Scout Jamboree for the western Los Angeles County Boy Scout Council in 1999
- In approximately the mid 1970s Bonnie Raitt did free anti nuclear power plant concerts.

Crime

Woodley Park was a scene of major drug dealing in the mid-1980s, a drug "supermarket" that was one of the most notorious areas in the San Fernando Valley for open drug sales. Increased police patrols, undercover operations, and surveillance by civilian volunteers curtailed the scene.

- A stabbing death occurred in 1986
- the murder of a homeless man kicked to death by two dozen men after an argument in 1988, and shootings at two public events in mid-1992, including at a reggae festival and, fatally, at an African-American college Greek organization event.

== Dog park ==
Approximately 1.5 acres (0.61 ha) of the park were set aside in the late 1980s as a dog park area. The city did not allocate funds until the 1990s for the construction of a fence needed for safer use by dogs and people.
