= Victory Boulevard (Los Angeles) =

Arterial road traversing the San Fernando Valley in Los Angeles

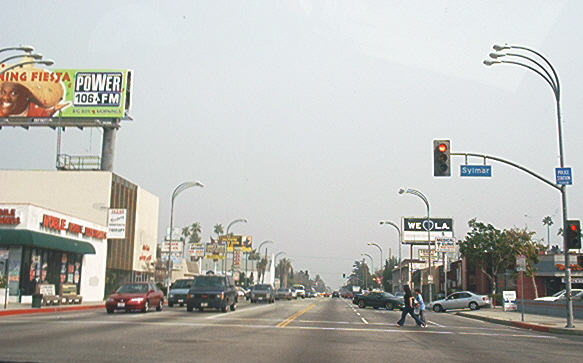
- Victory Boulevard in Van Nuys, 2002
- Namesake: To honor soldiers returning from World War I
- Maintained by: Bureau of Street Services, City of L.A. DPW, City of Burbank, City of Glendale
- Length: 25 mi (40 km)
- Nearest metro station: : Canoga; De Soto; Pierce College; Balboa; Woodley
- West end: Upper Las Virgenes Canyon Open Space Preserve
- Major junctions: SR 27; I-405; SR 170
- East end: Riverside Drive / SR 134

Victory Boulevard is a major mostly east–west arterial road that runs for 25 miles (40 km) traversing almost the entire length of the San Fernando Valley in Los Angeles and Burbank, California. About two miles (3.2 km) of the boulevard runs north–south before reaching its eastern terminus.

== History ==
When Van Nuys was plotted in 1911, Victory Boulevard was called 7th Avenue. Around 1916, the name was changed to Leesdale Avenue when the city of Los Angeles annexed the San Fernando Valley after the Los Angeles Aqueduct was completed. In the mid-1920s, the Leesdale Improvement Association unveiled plans to expand Leesdale Avenue as an 80-foot-wide (24 m) "great east-and-west boulevard" through the Valley. At that time, the city also changed the name to Victory Boulevard, in honor of soldiers returning from World War I, and paved the boulevard as far west as Balboa Boulevard where it ended. Victory Boulevard did not extend to the West Valley until the 1950s.

== Transit ==
The Metro Local Lines 96 and 164 runs along Victory Boulevard.

The G Line parallels Victory Boulevard for much of its route and has five stops on the boulevard: Canoga, De Soto, Pierce College, Balboa and Woodley. The G Line Bikeway is also routed along the boulevard for much of its route.

The East San Fernando Valley Light Rail Transit Project plans to have a stop at Victory and Van Nuys Boulevard in Van Nuys.

Chandler Boulevard Bike Path's eastern terminus is one block from Victory Boulevard.

== Communities ==
From west to east:

- West Hills – It is west of Shoup Avenue to the Victory Trailhead entrance of Ahmanson Ranch Park in the Simi Hills, Victory Boulevard marks the southern border of West Hills and northern border of adjacent Woodland Hills.
- Woodland Hills – It is between the western city limits, and Corbin Avenue on the east, Victory Boulevard marks the northern border of Woodland Hills, with West Hills, Canoga Park, and Winnetka to the north.
- Canoga Park – Victory Boulevard marks the southern border of Canoga Park between Shoup, and DeSoto, with Woodland Hills to the south
- Winnetka – DeSoto Avenue is the western boundary, Corbin Avenue is the eastern boundary, with the Los Angeles River and Woodland Hills to the south.
- Reseda – Victory Boulevard marks the southern border of Reseda between Corbin Avenue and White Oak Avenue, with Tarzana to the south..
- Tarzana – Victory Boulevard marks the northern border of Tarzana between Corbin Avenue (west) and Lindley Avenue (east)
- Lake Balboa – between White Oak and I-405 (the San Diego Freeway)
- Encino – Victory Boulevard marks the northern border of Encino between Lindley Avenue and White Oak
- Van Nuys – between I-405 (the San Diego Freeway) and Hazeltine Avenue
- Valley Glen – between Hazeltine Avenue and the Hollywood Freeway (SR 170)
- North Hollywood – between the Hollywood Freeway (SR 170) and Clybourn Avenue
- Burbank – between Clybourn Avenue and Allen Avenue
- Glendale – between Allen Avenue and Riverside Drive/Sonora Avenue

== Notable landmarks ==
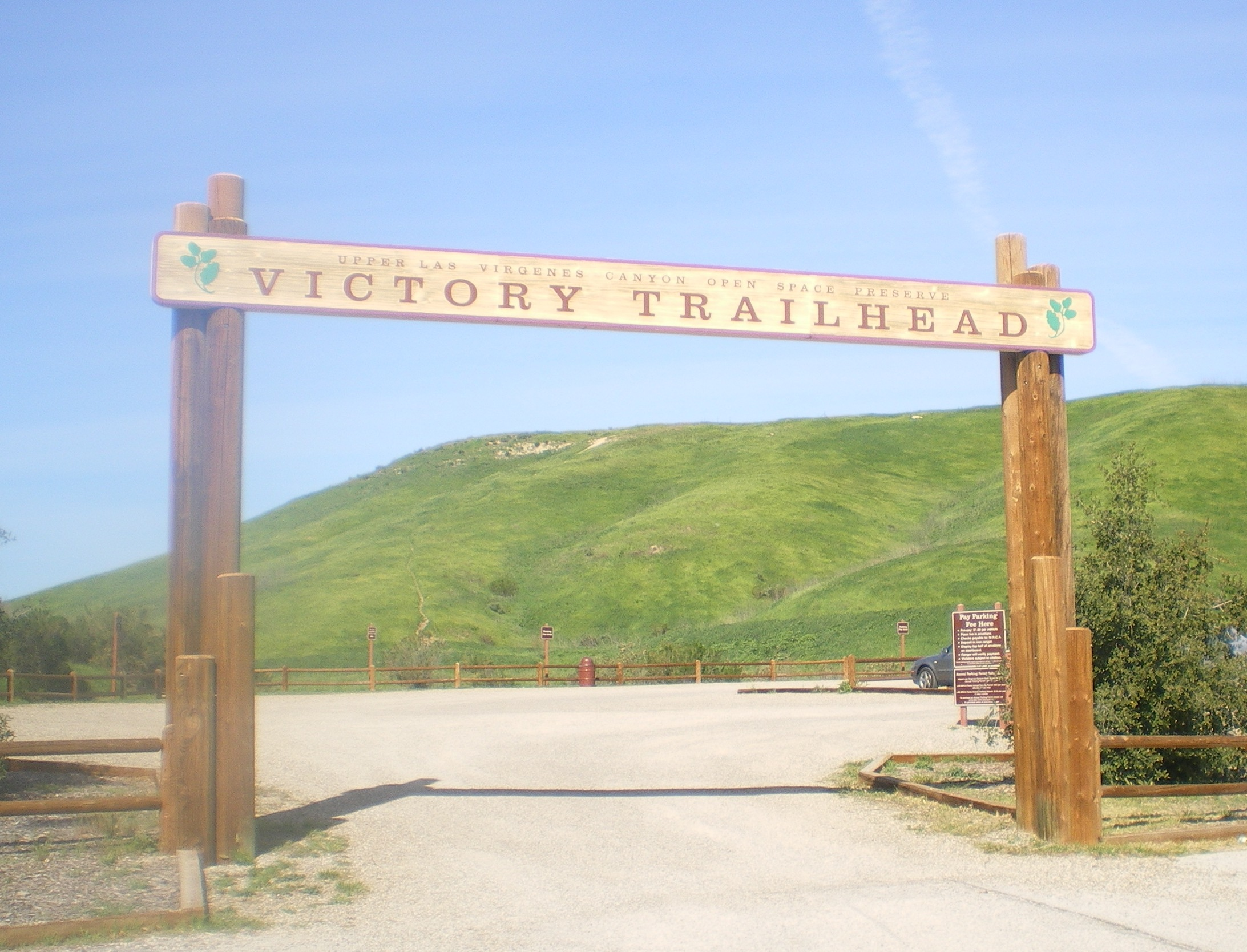
The Victory Trailhead, Upper Las Virgenes Canyon Open Space Preserve

From west to east:

- Upper Las Virgenes Canyon Open Space Preserve (formerly Ahmanson Ranch)— a 3,000-acre (1,200 ha) public nature preserve park of the Santa Monica Mountains Conservancy, located at the western terminus of Victory Boulevard near the West Hills—Woodland Hills boundary
- Fallbrook Center – 75-acre (300,000 m^{2}), 1-million-square-foot (93,000 m^{2}), open-air shopping center located at Victory Boulevard and Fallbrook Avenue in West Hills.
- Westfield Topanga – opened in 1964 as Topanga Plaza, California's first enclosed shopping mall, located on Topanga Canyon Boulevard at Victory Boulevard. The mall was extensively renovated from 2006 to 2008 and features 230 stores.
- Los Angeles Pierce College – opened in 1947 as an agricultural college and the San Fernando Valley's first institution of higher learning, Pierce College today is a two-year public college with almost 100 disciplines and 20,000 students, located on 426 acres (172 ha) in the Chalk Hills, with 2,200 trees, thousands of rose bushes, a nature preserve, botanical garden, and a forest area boasting giant redwoods; Pierce still maintains large sections of tillable and range land and a 226-acre (91 ha) farm at the west side of campus, with an equestrian center and small herds of cattle, sheep and goats
- Reseda Park and Recreation Center – park and recreation center located at 18411 Victory Boulevard. Includes barbecue pits, baseball diamond, basketball courts, children's play area, community room, picnic tables, seasonal pool, tennis courts, and volleyball courts.
- Reseda High School – a public high school in the Los Angeles Unified School District established in 1955; used as the setting for the high school in The Shield, several episodes of Buffy the Vampire Slayer and in the feature film Grosse Pointe Blank
- Sherman Oaks Center for Enriched Studies – located in Tarzana, SOCES is the largest magnet school in the Los Angeles Unified School District, 1780 students in grades 4–12; #1 High School API test score in LAUSD

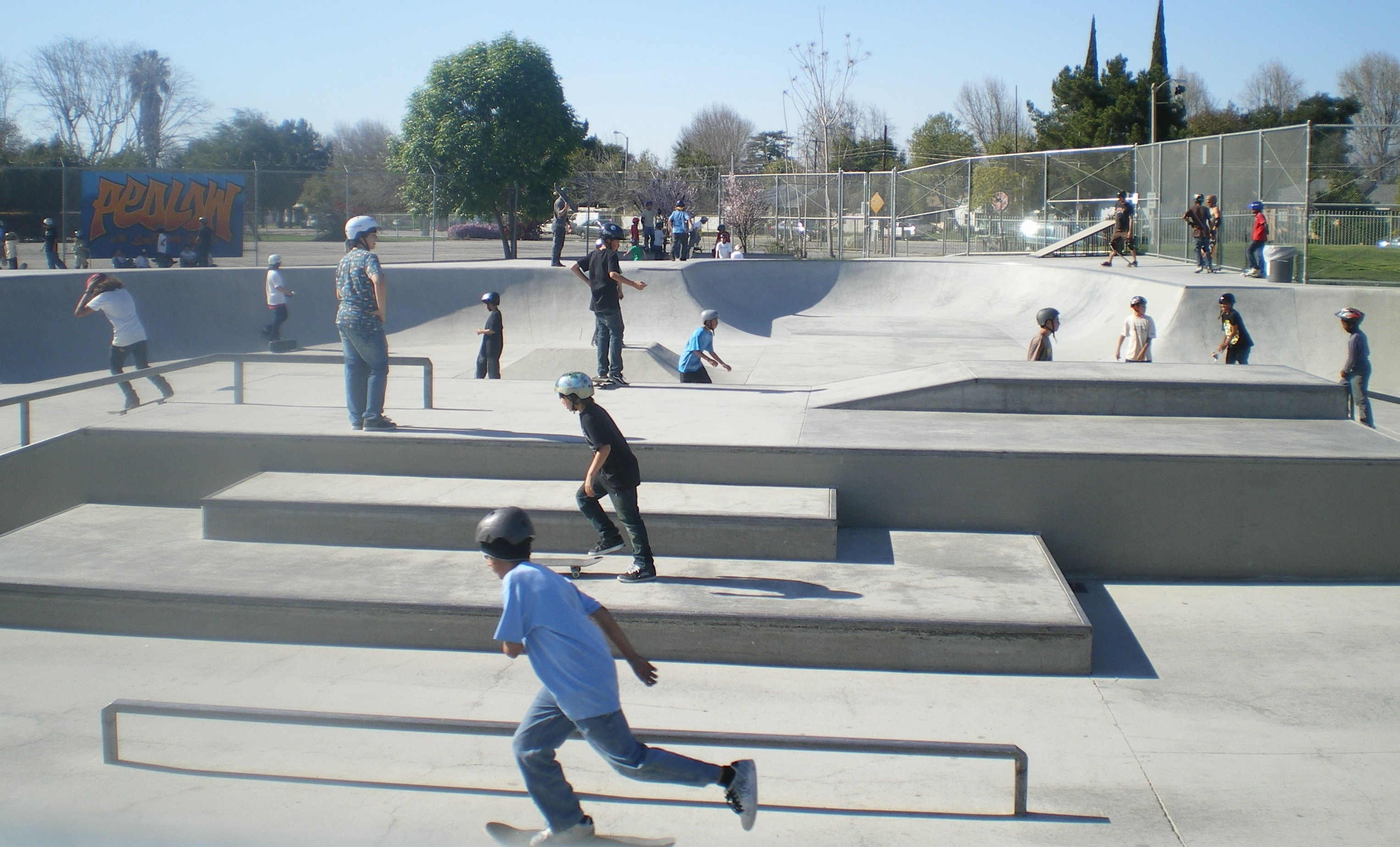
Pedlow Skate Park in Encino

- Sepulveda Basin Off-Leash Dog Park
- Pedlow Field Skate Park
- Birmingham High School, Lake Balboa – built in 1953 on the site of a U.S. Army hospital; from 1976 to 1979, the San Fernando Valley's first professional sports team, the Los Angeles Skyhawks of the American Soccer League, played their home games at Birmingham Stadium on Victory Boulevard. In May 1967, a rock concert at the football field at Birmingham High featured Jefferson Airplane, the Doors, the Merry-Go-Round, the Peanut Butter Conspiracy, the Sunshine Company, and the Nitty Gritty Dirt Band
- Lake Balboa – a 27-acre (11 ha) lake south of Victory Boulevard filled with water reclaimed from the Tillman Water Reclamation Plant featuring fishing, boating, remote-control boating and jogging/walking
- Van Nuys Golf Course
- Valley Plaza shopping center along Victory and Laurel Canyon Boulevards, opened in 1951 and by 1956 it claimed to cover 100 acres with 1,039,000 square feet of retail space, the third-largest in the nation at that time
- Valhalla Memorial Park Cemetery, North Hollywood – cemetery founded in 1923; the Portal of the Folded Wings, a tribute to the pioneers of aviation, is on the National Register of Historic Places
- Ralph Foy Park
- Nickelodeon studios
- Griffith Park – located at the eastern terminus of Victory Boulevard, Griffith Park is LA's largest park covering 4,210 acres (1,700 ha) with attractions including the Autry National Center, Greek Theatre, Griffith Observatory, L.A. Equestrian Center, Los Angeles Zoo, and Travel Town

=== Gallery of landmarks ===
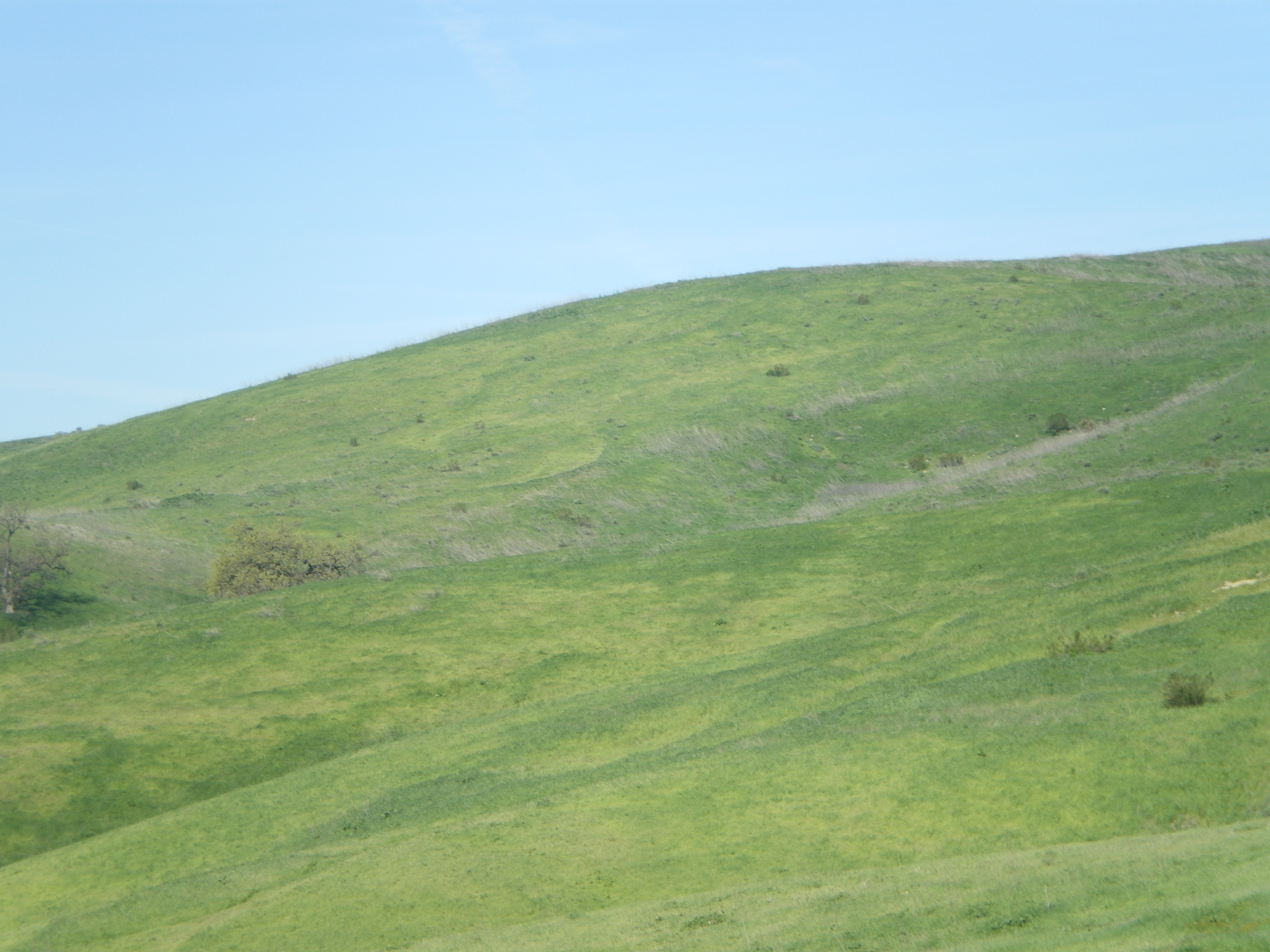
Upper Las Virgenes Canyon Open Space Preserve

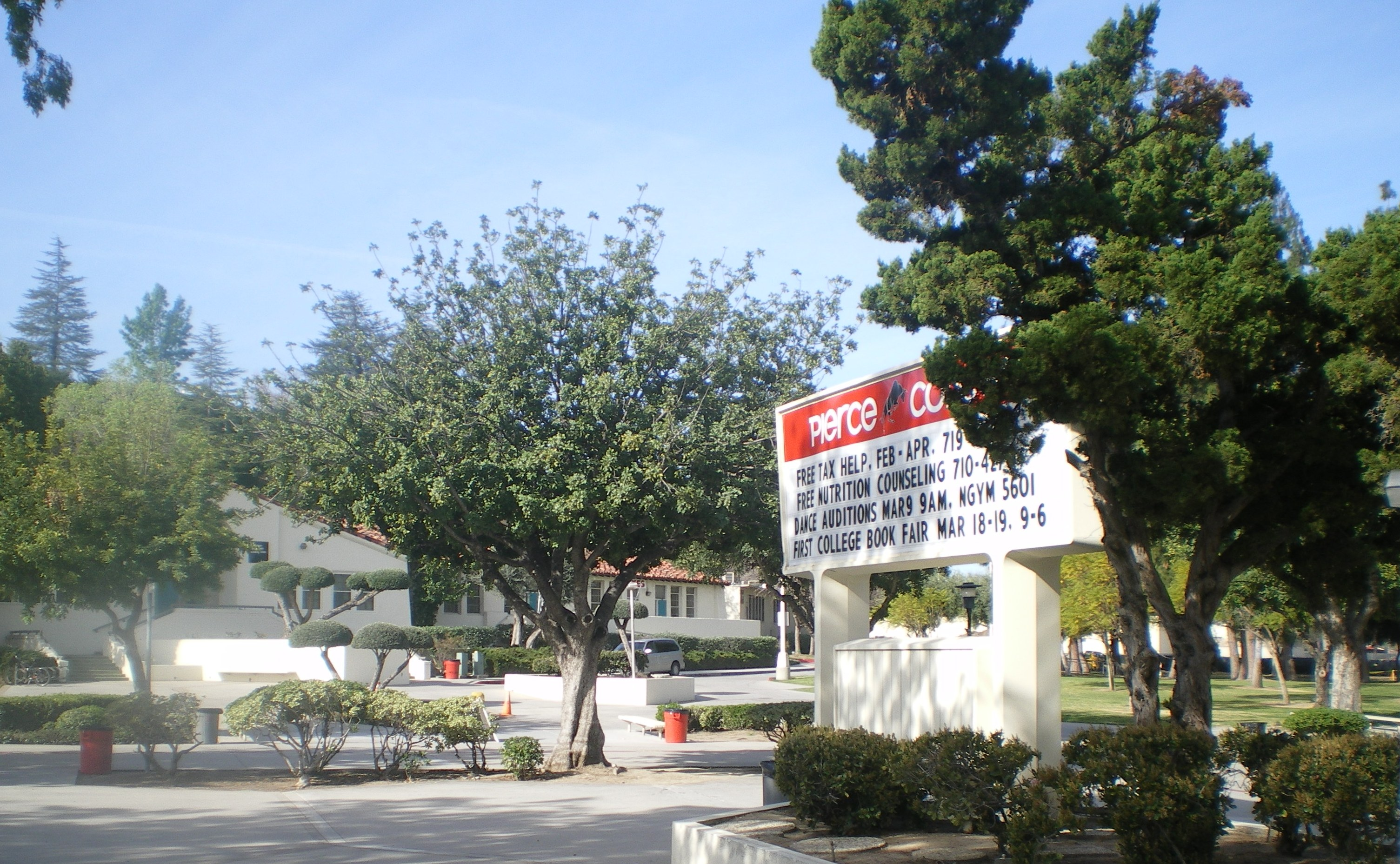
Pierce College, Woodland Hills

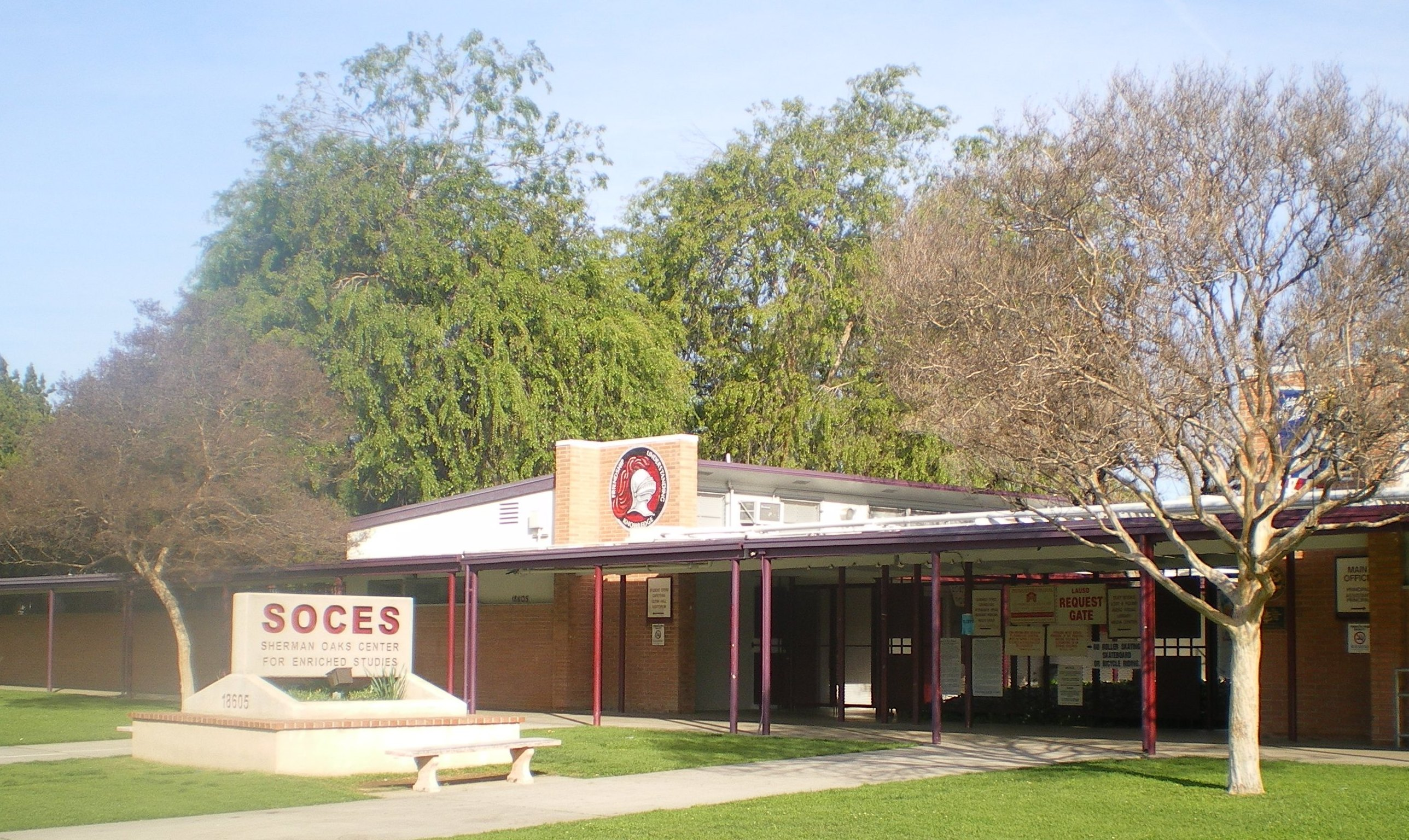
Sherman Oaks Center for Enriched Studies

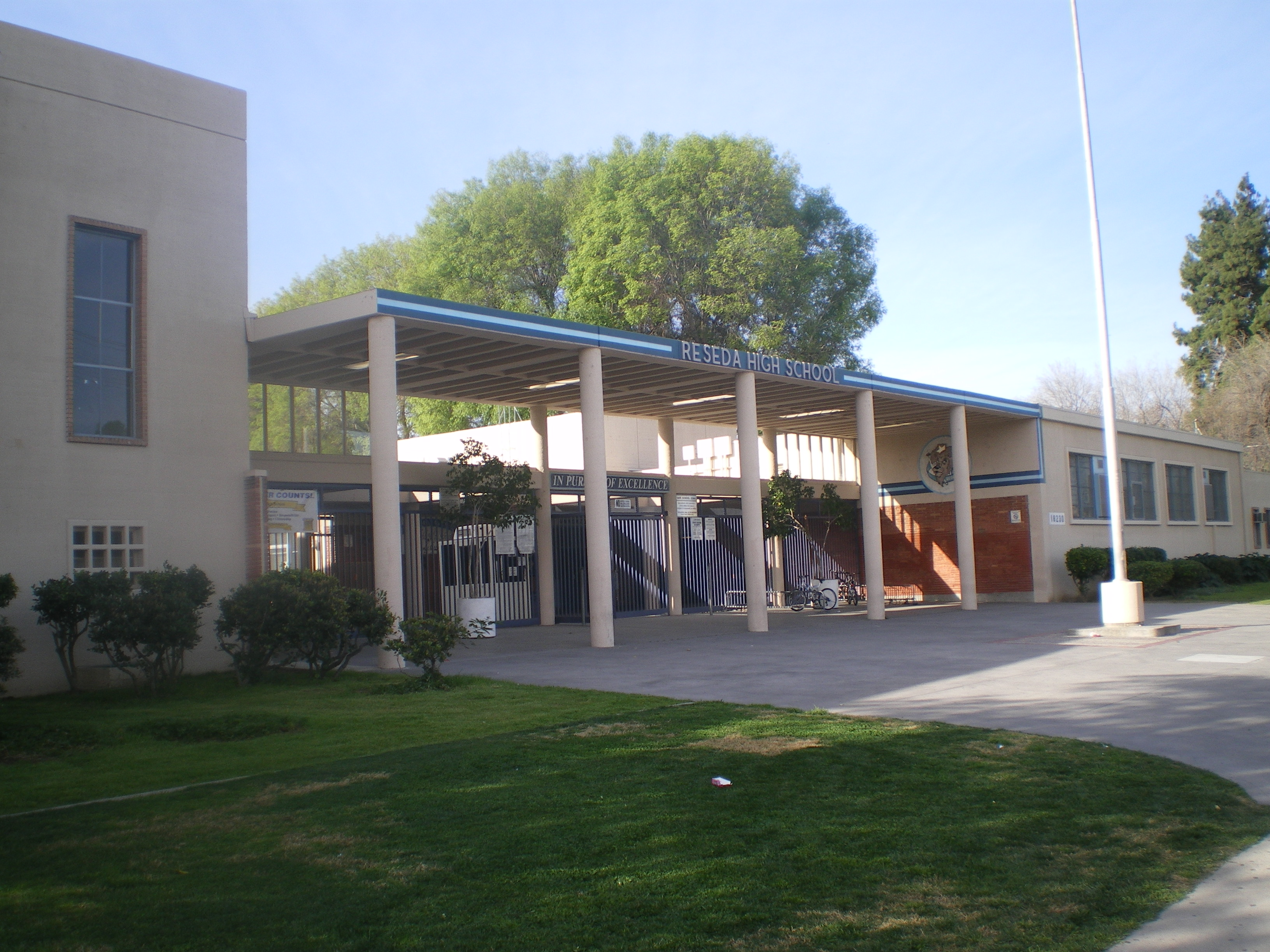
Reseda High School

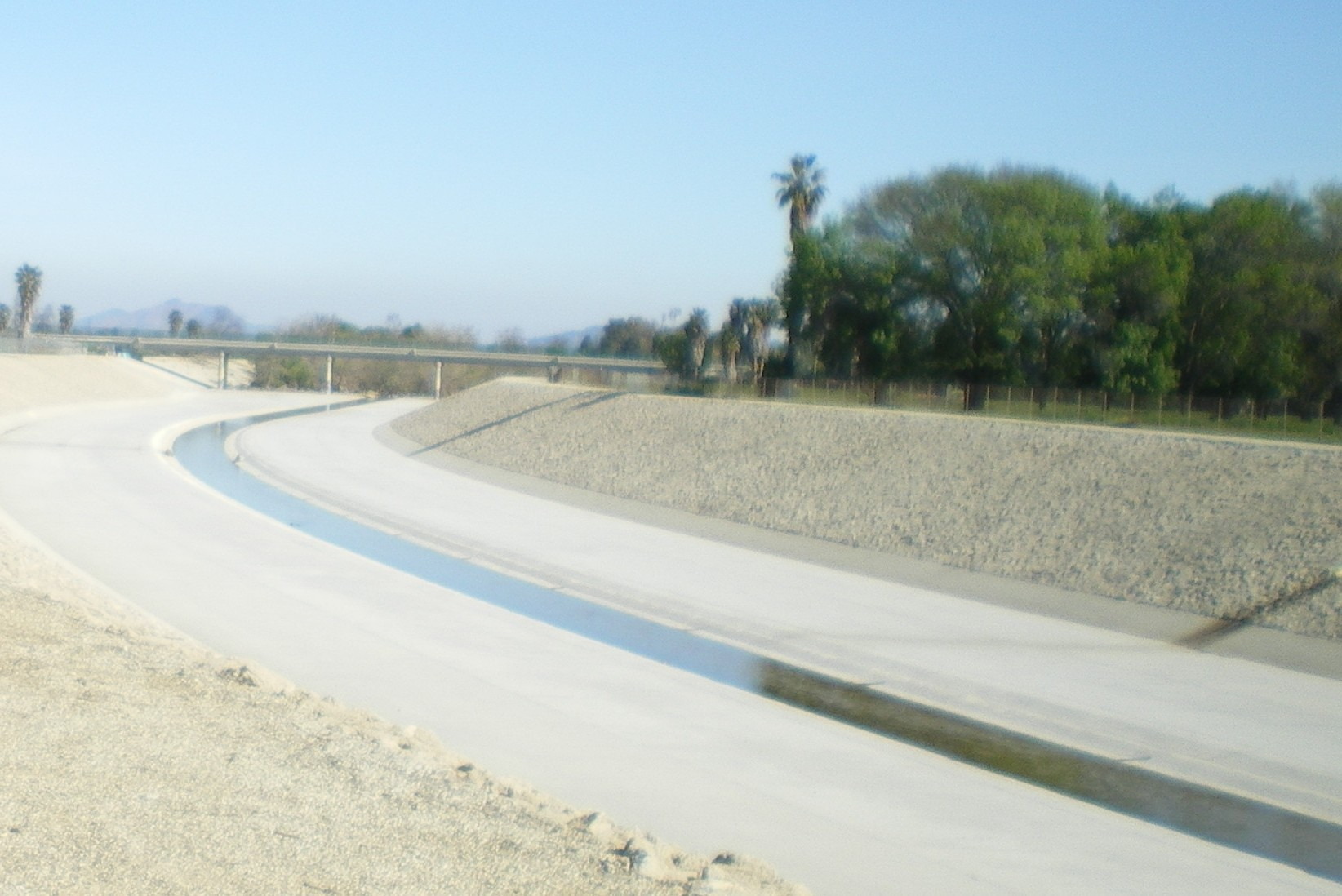
Los Angeles River at Victory and White Oak

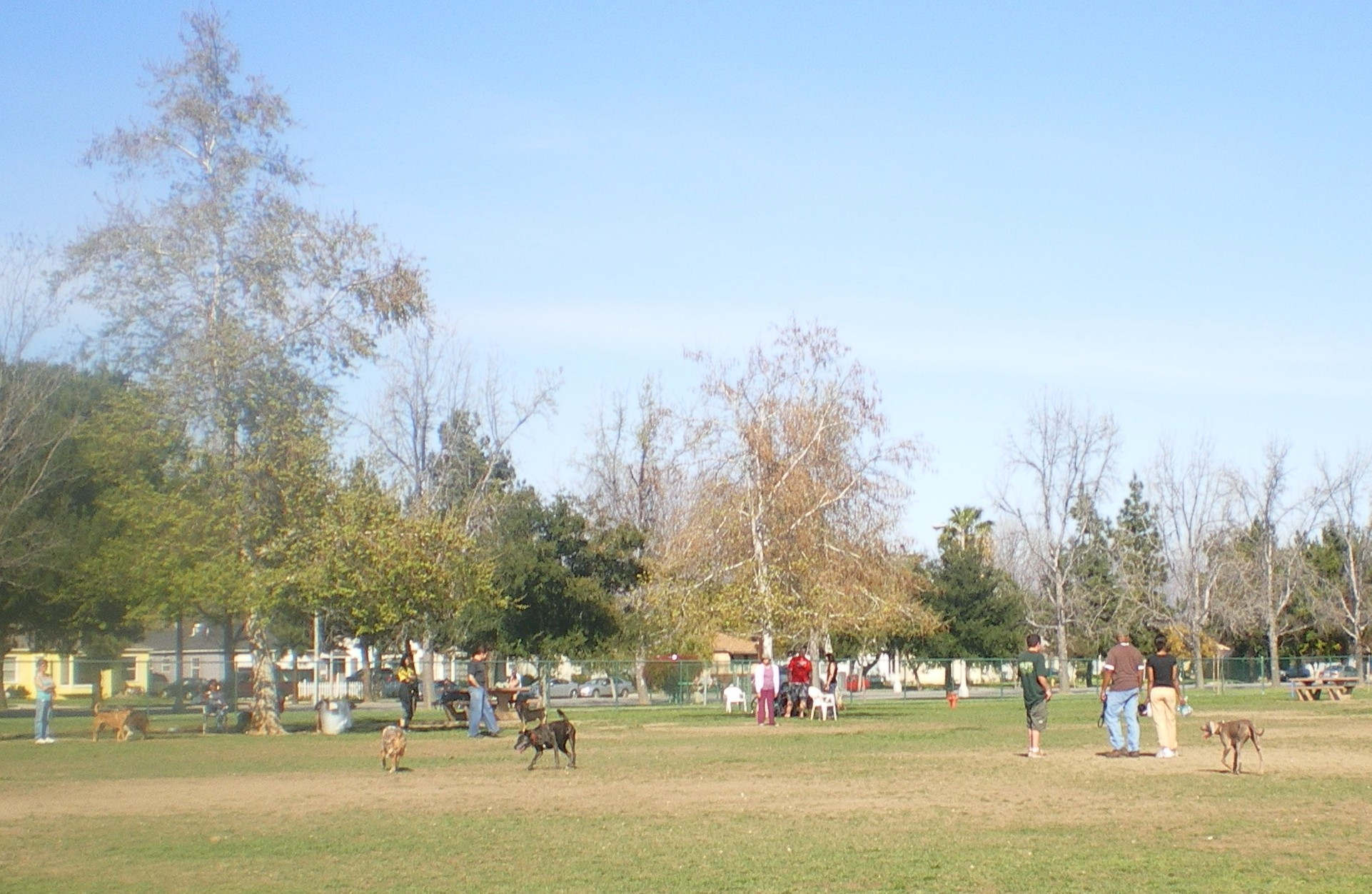
Sepulveda Off-Leash Dog Park

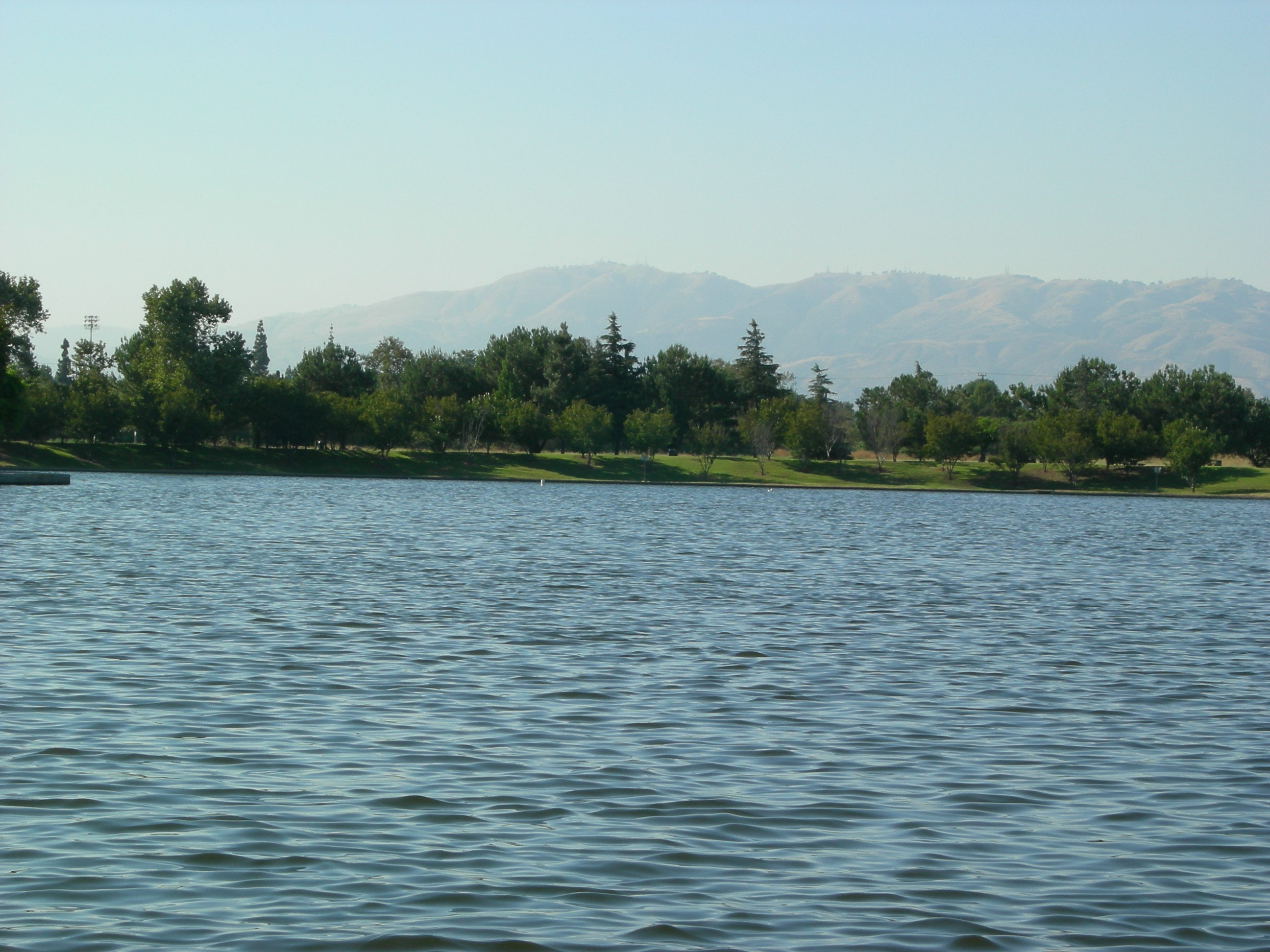
Lake Balboa

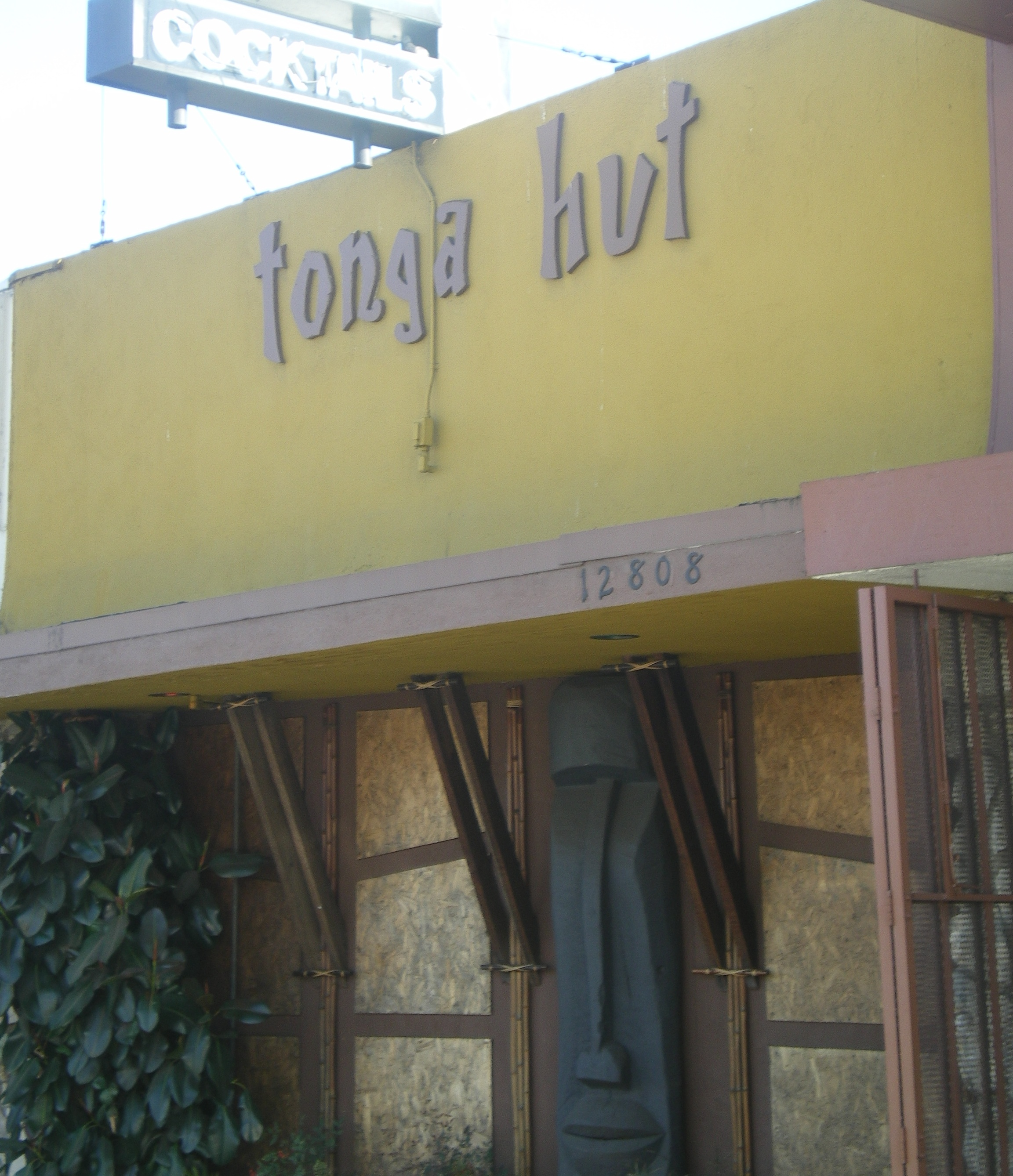
Tonga Hut in North Hollywood

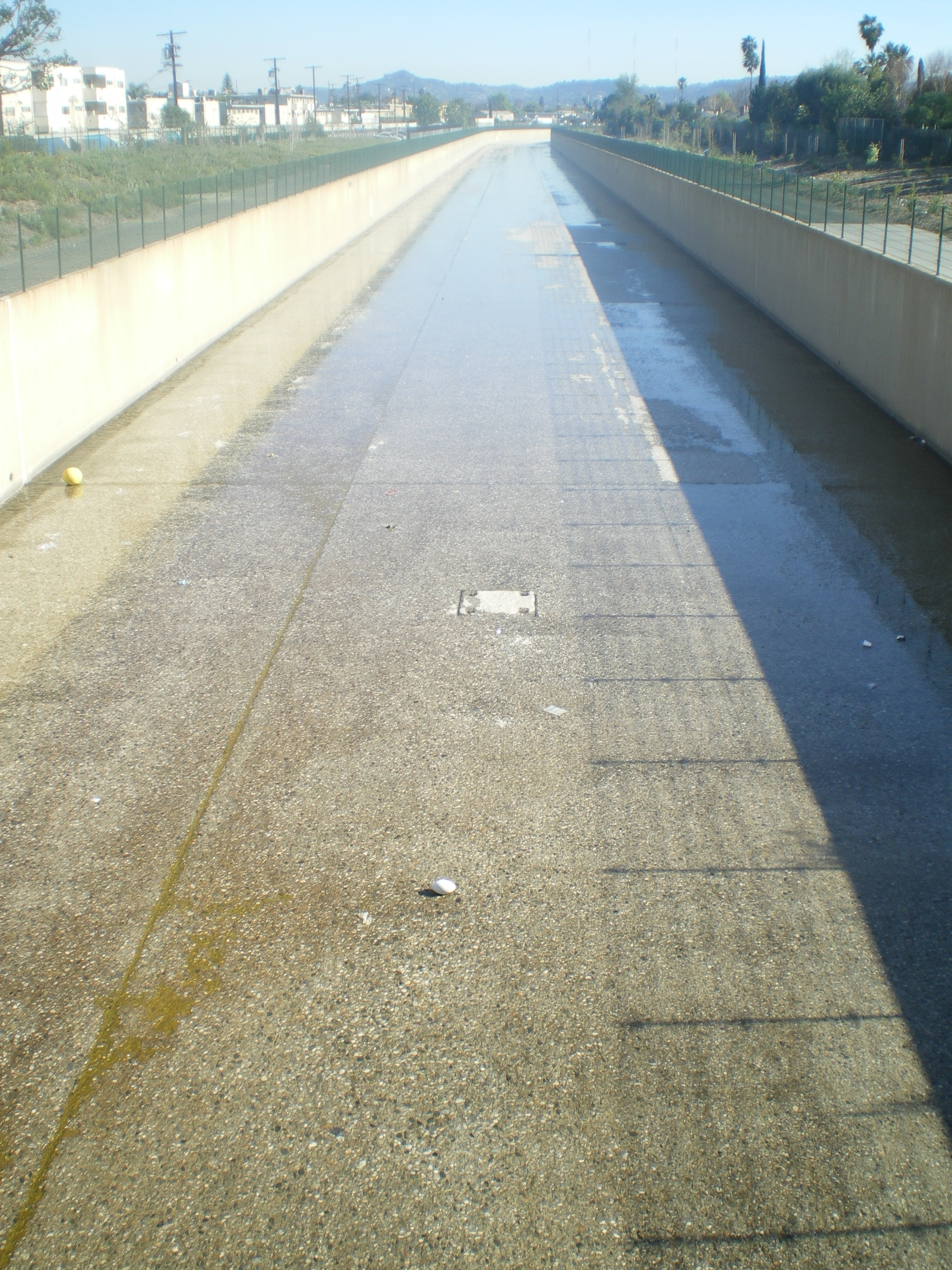
Tujunga Wash

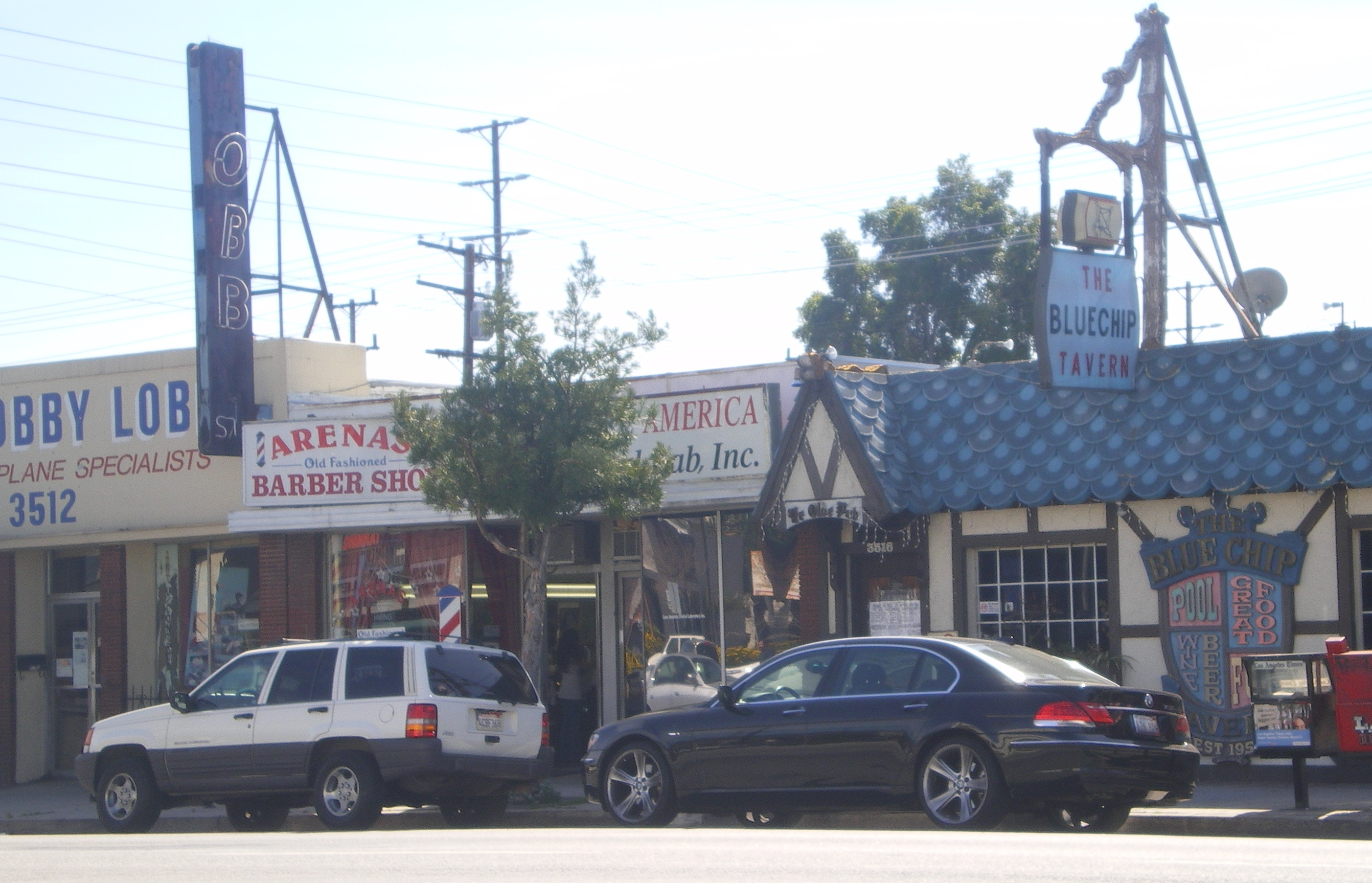
Street Scene in Burbank

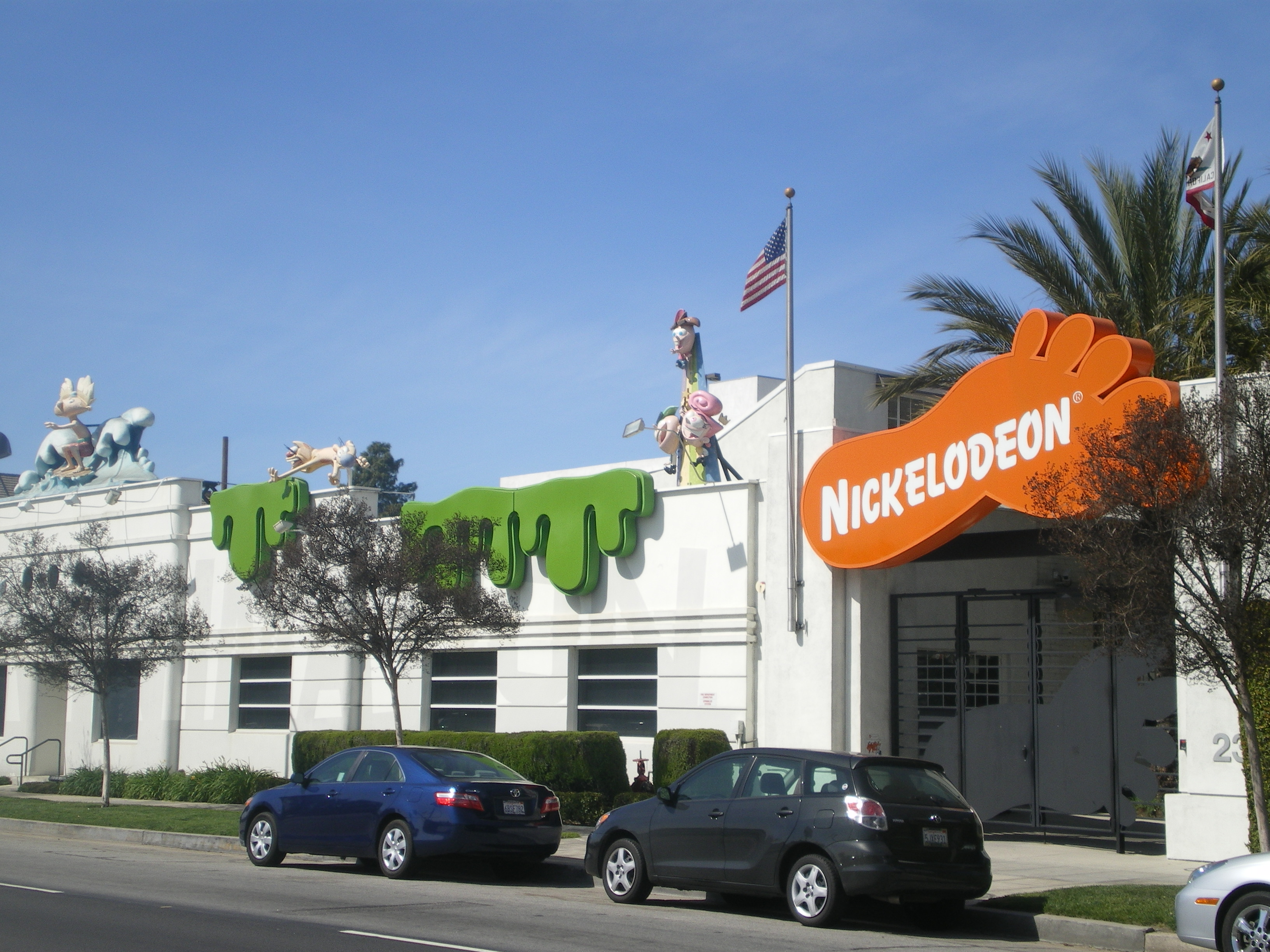
Nickelodeon Studios, Burbank

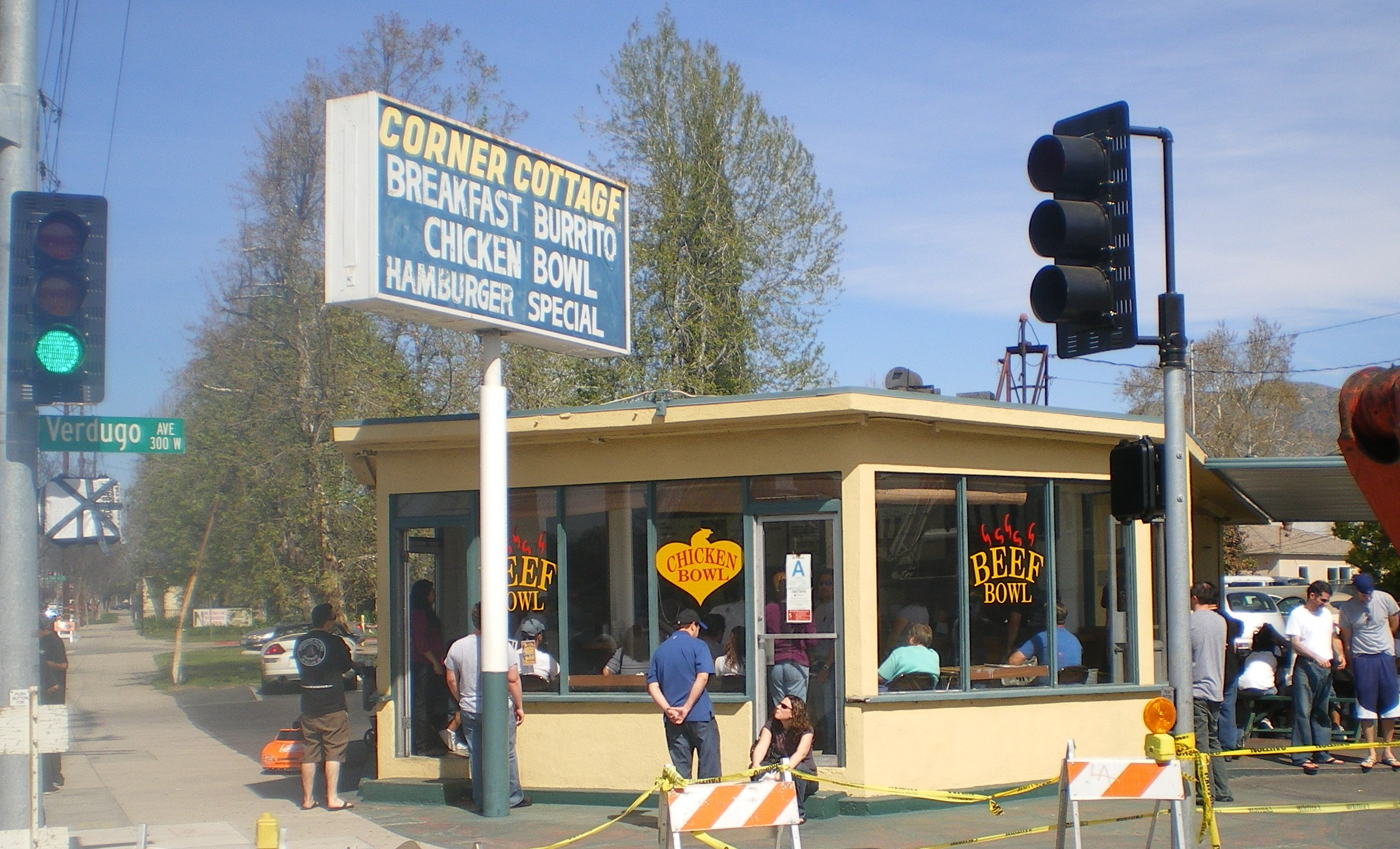
Corner Cottage Beef Bowl, Burbank

== In popular culture ==
Victory Boulevard is one of three Los Angeles boulevards mentioned in Randy Newman's song "I Love L.A."
