= Lake Balboa, Los Angeles =

Lake Balboa
- Neighborhood of Los Angeles
- Lake Balboa, the namesake of the Lake Balboa neighborhood

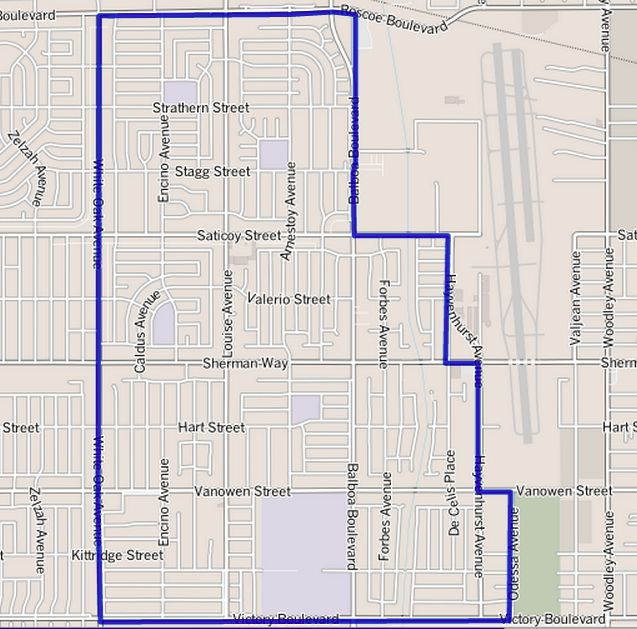
- Lake Balboa neighborhood as mapped by the Los Angeles Times. Van Nuys Airport is on the right.

- Location within Los Angeles/San Fernando Valley Lake Balboa (the Los Angeles metropolitan area)
- Coordinates: 34°12′04″N 118°30′04″W
- Country: United States
- State: California
- County: Los Angeles
- City: Los Angeles

Lake Balboa is a neighborhood in the San Fernando Valley region of Los Angeles, California. The area was previously part of Van Nuys.

== Population ==
The 2000 U.S. census counted 24,328 residents in the 3.13-square-mile Lake Balboa neighborhood—or 7,754 people per square mile, about an average population density for the city. In 2008, the city estimated that the population had increased to 26,195. In 2000 the median age for residents was 35, considered average for city and county neighborhoods, but the percentage of residents aged 35 to 49 was among the county's highest.

The neighborhood was considered "highly diverse" ethnically within Los Angeles. The breakdown was whites, 49%; Latinos, 34.1%; Asians, 8.8%; blacks, 3.5%; and others, 4.6%. Mexico (26%) and El Salvador (14.8%) were the most common places of birth for the 31.8% of the residents who were born abroad—a high percentage for Los Angeles.

The median yearly household income in 2008 dollars was $65,336, considered average for the city and county. Renters occupied 34.1% of the housing stock and house- or apartment-owners held 65.9%. The percentages of households that earned $40,000 to $125,000 a year were high for the county.

== Geography ==
On November 2, 2007, the Los Angeles City Council approved a motion renaming a large portion of Van Nuys to Lake Balboa. The new boundaries are as follows:

- I-405 / US-101 intersection, north to Saticoy Street,
- Saticoy Street west to Valjean Avenue,
- Valjean Avenue south to Vanowen Street,
- Vanowen Street west to Hayvenhurst Avenue,
- Hayvenhurst Avenue north to Saticoy Street,
- Saticoy Street west to Balboa Boulevard,
- Balboa Boulevard north to Balboa Place and then north to Roscoe Boulevard,
- Roscoe Boulevard west to Louise Avenue (south side of Roscoe Boulevard from Balboa Boulevard to Louise Avenue will remain in Northridge with the 91325 ZIP code),
- Louise Avenue south to Saticoy Street (east side of Louise Avenue from Roscoe Boulevard to Stagg Street will remain Northridge with the 91325 ZIP code),
- Saticoy Street west to White Oak Avenue,
- White Oak Avenue south to Victory Boulevard,
- Victory Boulevard east to Balboa Boulevard,
- Balboa Boulevard south to the Los Angeles River,
- The Los Angeles River southeasterly to where US-101 and I-405 meet.

=== Surroundings ===
Lake Balboa is flanked on the north by Northridge, on the east by Van Nuys, on the south by the Sepulveda Basin and on the west by Reseda. Its street and other boundaries are Roscoe Boulevard on the north, Balboa Place, the Van Nuys Airport, Hayvenhurst Avenue and Odessa Avenue on the east, Victory Boulevard on the south and White Oak Avenue on the west.

== Economy ==
MGA Entertainment, a toy maker, previously had its headquarters in the Lake Balboa area, before moving to Chatsworth in the NW San Fernando Valley.

== Parks and recreation ==
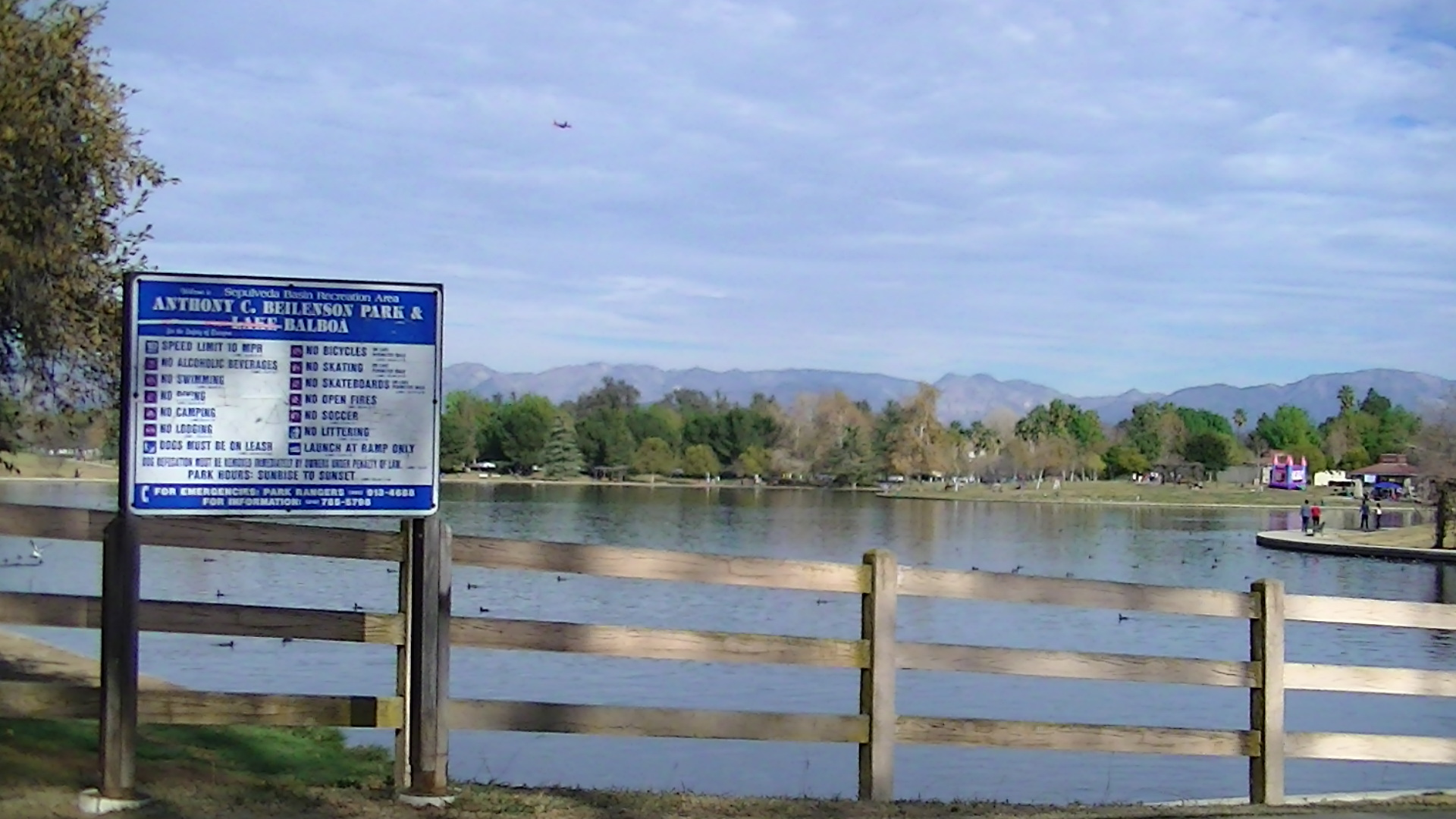
Lake Balboa pond in Anthony C. Beilenson Park.

- Lake Balboa Park, or Anthony C. Beilenson Park – an 80-acre (32 ha) recreation facility in the Sepulveda Basin Recreation Area, named for Anthony C. Beilenson. The only staff members at the park are lifeguards. The centerpiece of the park is the 27 acres (11 ha) Lake Balboa, filled with water from the Tillman Water Reclamation Plant. The park has barbecue pits, a bicycle path, a cascade, a children's play area, a fly fishing area, a 1.3 miles (2.1 km) jogging path, a lake for fishing (swimming is prohibited), a launch ramp, pedal boats, picnic pavilions and picnic tables, private boating (only boats without motors are accepted, unless the boats are for electric trolling), a remote control boating cove, and toilet facilities. Japanese cherry blossom trees are located in the park. Parking lots exist at the park The parks and recreation department dedicated a universally accessible playground, a playground designed for handicapped and non-handicapped children, at the Beilenson Park on Monday, June 9, 2008.
- The Japanese Garden – a contemporary Japanese garden in the Sepulveda Basin Recreation Area, at the Tillman Water Reclamation Plant.
- Sepulveda Dam Recreation Area Bike Path, in the Sepulveda Basin Recreation Area.
- Woodley Park – in the Sepulveda Basin Recreation Area. It has an Apollo 3 Flight Field, an archery range, barbecue pits, an unlighted baseball diamond, a children's play area, cricket fields, picnic tables, toilets, and a wildlife nature preserve area. It is unstaffed and unlocked. In addition two pocket parks are located in Lake Balboa.
- Jesse Owens Mini-Park, a 1.74 acres (0.70 ha) park, with toilet facilities. It is unstaffed and unlocked.
- Louise Park, a pocket park with barbecue pits, a lighted baseball diamond, many picnic benches, unlighted outdoor basketball courts, a children's play area, and picnic tables. It is unstaffed and unlocked.
- G Line Bikeway, along the landscaped Los Angeles Metro G Line route from North Hollywood to Chatsworth.

== Government and infrastructure ==
=== Local government ===
The majority of Lake Balboa is located in Los Angeles City Council District 6, with a small portion at the northwest corner of the neighborhood falling into Los Angeles City Council District 12.

The Los Angeles Fire Department Station 100 West Van Nuys/Lake Balboa, located in Lake Balboa, serves Lake Balboa.

The Los Angeles Police Department operates the West Valley Community Police Station in Reseda, California, serving Lake Balboa.

=== County, state, and federal representation ===
The United States Postal Service Van Nuys Post Office is located at 15701 Sherman Way in Lake Balboa.

== Education ==
Twenty-five percent of Lake Balboa residents aged 25 and older had earned a four-year degree by 2000, an average figure for both the city and the county.

Schools within the Lake Balboa boundaries are:

=== Public ===
- Birmingham Community Charter High School, 17000 Haynes Street
- Community Charter Early College High School, 11500 Eldridge Avenue
- High Tech Los Angeles, charter high school, 17111 Victory Boulevard
- Daniel Pearl Magnet High School, 6649 Balboa Boulevard
- William Mulholland Middle School, 17120 Vanowen Street
- Lorne Street Elementary School, 17440 Lorne Street
- Stagg Street Elementary School, 7839 Amestoy Street
- Anatola Avenue Elementary School, 7364 Anatola Avenue
- Gault Street Elementary School, 17000 Gault Street
- Lemay Street Elementary School, 17520 Vanowen Street
- Lake Balboa College Preparatory Magnet School, 6701 Balboa Boulevard
- Independence Continuation School, 6501 Balboa Boulevard
- Magnolia Science Academy 2, 17125 Victory Boulevard

=== Private ===
- Oak Meadow School, K-12, 17645 Saticoy Street
- The City School, elementary, 17424 Sherman Way
- Saint Bridget of Sweden Elementary School, 7120 Whitaker Avenue
