= Breach (Shivaree EP) =

EP by Shivaree
- Released: October 19, 2004
- Genre: Alternative rock
- Label: Zoë Records

Shivaree chronology
Rough Dreams (2002)	Breach (2004)	Who's Got Trouble? (2005)

Breach is an EP of 5 songs including three cover songs by Shivaree, released by Zoë Records in 2004. "I close my eyes" and "657 bed b" are the original songs while the rest are covers. The first two songs were later included in the follow-up full-length album Who's Got Trouble?. This EP also features a new recording of "Fear is a man's best friend" which Shivaree had already recorded previously and included in their "John, 2/14" maxi single.

== Track listing ==
1. "The Fat Lady of Limbourg" (Eno)
2. "I Close My Eyes" (Parsley/McVinnie)
3. "Fear Is A Man's Best Friend" (Cale)
4. "Strange Boat" (scott/thistlethwaite) (featuring Ed Hardcourt)
5. "657 Bed B" (Parsley/Bondy)

== Personnel ==
- Ambrosia Parsley – Vocals
- Duke McVinnie – Guitar
- Danny McGough – Keyboards
