= Corrupt and Immoral Transmissions =

Corrupt And Immoral Transmissions

EP (studio/live) by Shivaree
- Released: 2000
- Genre: Rock, adult alternative
- Length: 11:13
- Label: Capitol

Shivaree chronology
Corrupt And Immoral Transmissions (2000)	Rough Dreams (2002)

Corrupt And Immoral Transmissions is the first EP by American alternative rock band Shivaree, released by Capitol Records in 2000. It features remastered version of live radio performances by the band and two unreleased studio recordings.

== Track listing ==
1. "Goodnight Moon (Live)" (Ambrosia Parsley, Duke McVinnie) – 4:14
2. "I Don't Care (Live)" (Ambrosia Parsley, Duke McVinnie, Mia Sharp) – 4:26
3. "Scrub" (Parsley, Duke McVinnie) – 5:50
4. "My Boy Lollipop" (Johnny Roberts, Morris Levy, Robert Spencer) – 2:33

== Personnel ==
- Ambrosia Parsley – Vocals
- Duke McVinnie – Guitar
- Danny McGough – Keyboards
- Sheldon Gomber - Bass
- Andrew Borger - Drums
- Smonkey Hormel - Bass
