= Reseda, Los Angeles =

Reseda
- Neighborhood of Los Angeles
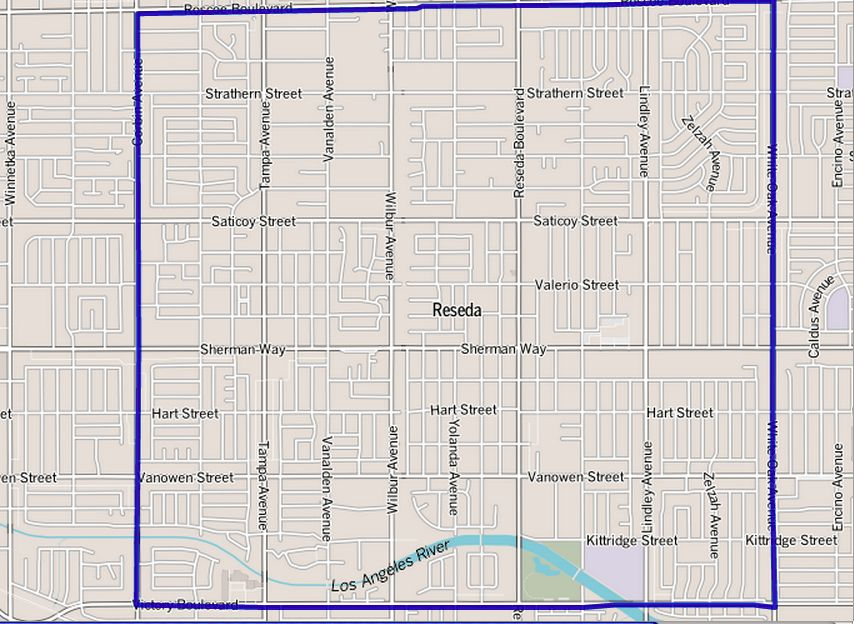
- Boundaries of Reseda from an illustration by The Los Angeles Times

- Location of Reseda in Los Angeles and the San Fernando Valley Reseda (the Los Angeles metropolitan area)
- Coordinates: 34°12′4″N 118°32′8″W
- Country: United States
- State: California
- County: Los Angeles
- City: Los Angeles
- Named for: Reseda odorata

Population (2010)
  - Total: 74,363

Reseda /rəˈsiːdə/ is a neighborhood in the San Fernando Valley region of Los Angeles, California, United States. It was founded in 1912, and its central business district started developing in 1915. The neighborhood was devoted to agriculture for many years. Earthquakes struck the area in 1971 and 1994.

The neighborhood has 15 public and five private schools. The community includes public parks, a senior center and a regional branch library.

== History ==
=== Founding and growth ===
The area now known as Reseda was inhabited by Native Americans of the Tongva tribe who lived close to the Los Angeles River.

In 1909 the Suburban Homes Company, a syndicate led by H. J. Whitley, general manager of the Board of Control, Harry Chandler, H. G. Otis, M. H. Sherman and O. F. Brandt purchased 48,000 acres of the Farming and Milling Company for $2,500,000. Henry E. Huntington extended his Pacific Electric Railway (Red Cars) through the Valley to Owensmouth (now Canoga Park). The Suburban Home Company laid out plans for roads and the towns of Van Nuys, Reseda (Marian) and Canoga Park (Owensmouth). Los Angeles annexed the rural areas in 1915.

On land that was originally part of the San Fernando Mission, Reseda originated in 1912 as the town of Marian. It was named after Marian Otis Chandler, the daughter of Los Angeles Times publisher Harrison Gray Otis and wife of Harry Chandler. The name Reseda refers to the fragrant plant Reseda odorata (mignonette) which was commonly found in gardens of the time and is native to many areas with a Mediterranean climate.

The geographic name "Reseda" was first used for a siding on a branch of the Southern Pacific Railroad, which ran between the cities of Burbank and Chatsworth in the San Fernando Valley. In the 1920s, the name was transferred from the Southern Pacific Railroad to the Western Division of the Pacific Electric Railway "Red Cars Line", which had expedited development after the building of the Los Angeles Aqueduct. Later, it was used as the name of a stop on the Pacific Electric interurban railway along Sherman Way.

Throughout this time, the town's name of Marian remained; then in 1921, when a Fourth Class Post Office was found to be necessary, the town's name had to be changed. As the Zelzah Tribune reported:

The Marian territory has made application for a post office to serve that district. To avoid confusion in mail distribution it is necessary that the name of the town be changed and the people of that community have decided upon the name Reseda, and if the application is granted it will be the only post office in the United States by that name. Mrs. Turner, we are told, who has taken an active interest in the canvass and to create a sentiment for post office advantages, will possibly be the postmistress.

Ninety-two residents convened and agreed to rename the town Reseda. The new post office bearing the name was established on May 9, 1922, although local records show that the post office was dedicated on May 26. The post office officially opened on July 1, with receipts of $1.59.

The central business district began in 1915, at what is now the intersection of Reseda Boulevard and Sherman Way, with the construction of a hardware store. Soon a blacksmith shop and an auto repair garage were built nearby, followed by a grocery store and a drugstore. There were no sidewalks or pavement yet; most were added between 1918 and the early 1920s. On the southwest corner of Sherman Way a wooden building housed the volunteer fire department until 1922, when the present brick building was erected, as was the Reseda Bank. The wooden building housing the fire department was then moved to the southeast side of Sherman Way, where it remained until 1933. In May 1929, the city's namesake roadway, Reseda Avenue, was renamed Reseda Boulevard by a Los Angeles City ordinance. Parts of the original 1920s and 1930s residential neighborhood remain southwest of Sherman Way and Reseda Boulevard as well as in Reseda Ranch near Grover Cleveland High School.

Reseda grew slowly, with the stock market crash of 1929 and subsequent Great Depression further slowing expansion.

During the late 1920s and 1930s, the area's reputation developed for its production of lettuce, lima beans, sugar beets, and walnuts, becoming known as one of the nation's largest producers of lettuce by the late 1930s. The Southern Pacific Railroad trains came up the middle of Sherman Way to pick up freight cars of lettuce daily during the lettuce harvest season. Around that time, manufacturing roof tile, canning poultry products, and processing walnuts began to emerge as viable businesses as well.

=== Postwar suburb ===
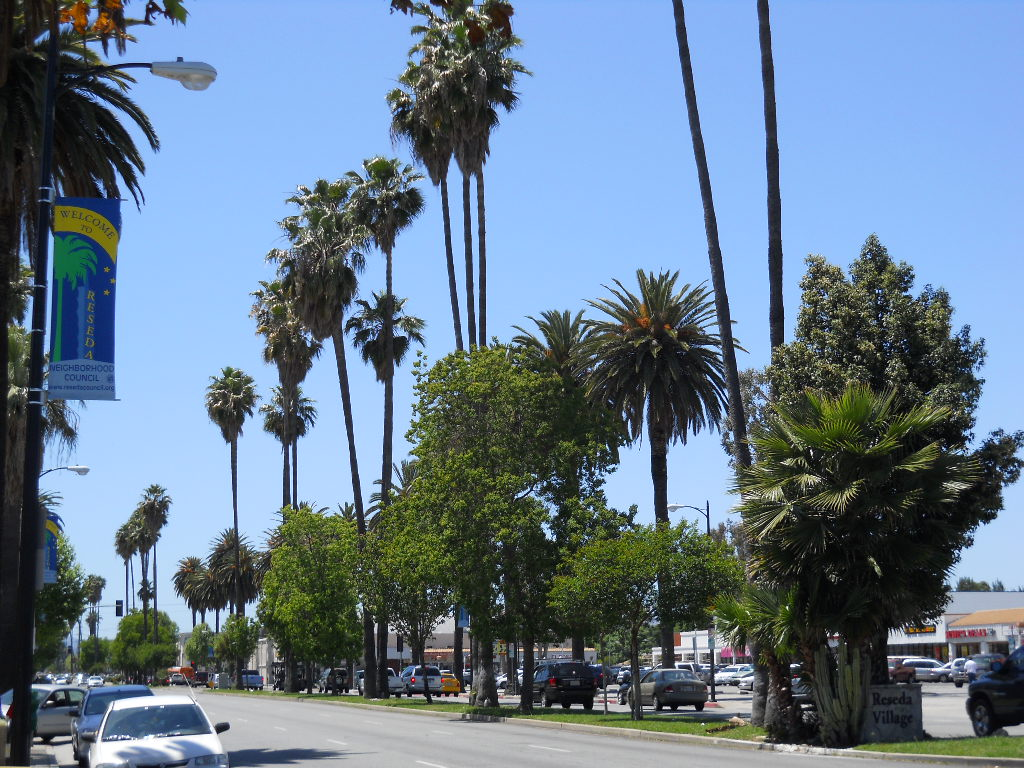
Facing west on Sherman Way

Reseda remained primarily an agricultural community, with a population of 1,805 in 1930. By 1940 the population had increased to 4,147. The mid- to late 1940s saw a large increase in the numbers of single-family dwellings and the loss of numerous acres of agriculture, and the addition of First Class Postal Service. Reseda was one of the early suburbs in the San Fernando Valley. The large ranches were subdivided, and the area was developed by realtors just as World War II veterans were returning home. The familiar orange groves were successively plowed under in favor of housing. At the time, most jobs were in the Los Angeles Basin and to the south, over the Santa Monica mountains.

By 1950, Reseda had over 16,000 residents, and in the early 1950s a population explosion took place, making Reseda one of the most popular and populated Valley communities. Because of this, Reseda's merchants provided bus service to transport shoppers throughout the busy downtown Reseda areas.

In the early 1950s, the Valley's population reached 400,000. The average new Valley home, in 1949, cost $9,000. By 1955, that same house could go for nearly $15,000. Even at that price, though, a household income was about $6,000 per year, making Valley incomes higher than the national average. By 1960, the average market value of a Valley home reached $18,850.

During the 1970s, the above-average residential real estate values and income patterns began to decline. Land and housing costs shot upward, while most incomes only crept. By the beginning of the 1980s, the average price of a home in the Valley reached $110,000. According to a 2004 study by the U.S. Bureau of the Census, it has tripled that of the early 1980s.

=== Northridge earthquake ===
The 1994 Northridge earthquake struck at 4:31 a.m. on January 17 and measured 6.7 on the moment magnitude scale. It remains the only large earthquake to originate directly under a major U.S. city in modern times as well as the most damaging earthquake to strike the U.S. since the San Francisco Earthquake of 1906. Its epicenter was between Arminta Street and Ingomar Street, just west of Reseda Boulevard.

This was the second time in 23 years the area had been affected by a strong earthquake. On February 9, 1971, the San Fernando earthquake (also known as the Sylmar earthquake) struck the area with a magnitude of 6.6.

== Geography ==
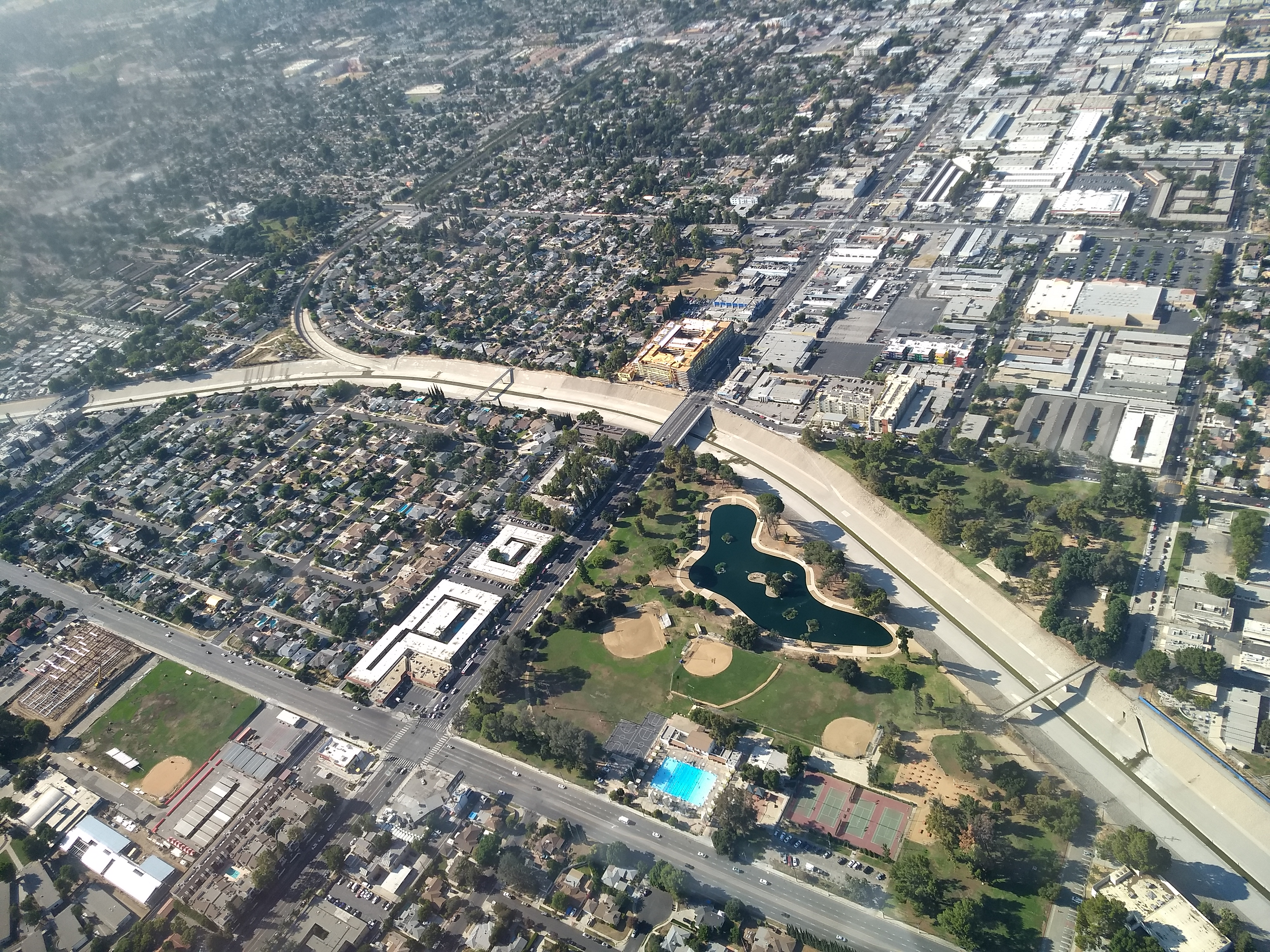
Aerial view of Reseda (2019)

Reseda is flanked on the north by Northridge, on the east by Lake Balboa, on the south by Tarzana and Encino, on the southwest by Woodland Hills, and on the west by Winnetka. Its street boundaries are Roscoe Boulevard on the north, White Oak Avenue on the east, Victory Boulevard on the south and Corbin Avenue on the west.

Climate data for Reseda, Los Angeles
| Month | Jan | Feb | Mar | Apr | May | Jun | Jul | Aug | Sep | Oct | Nov | Dec | Year |
|---|---|---|---|---|---|---|---|---|---|---|---|---|---|
| Mean daily maximum °F (°C) | 67 (19) | 69 (21) | 71 (22) | 77 (25) | 80 (27) | 87 (31) | 93 (34) | 95 (35) | 90 (32) | 83 (28) | 74 (23) | 68 (20) | 80 (27) |
| Mean daily minimum °F (°C) | 42 (6) | 43 (6) | 44 (7) | 46 (8) | 50 (10) | 54 (12) | 58 (14) | 59 (15) | 56 (13) | 51 (11) | 44 (7) | 41 (5) | 49 (9) |
| Average precipitation inches (mm) | 3.95 (100) | 4.16 (106) | 3.53 (90) | 0.83 (21) | 0.29 (7.4) | 0.06 (1.5) | 0.01 (0.25) | 0.16 (4.1) | 0.27 (6.9) | 0.57 (14) | 1.38 (35) | 2.14 (54) | 17.37 (441) |

== Demographics ==
The 2010 U.S. census counted 74,363 residents in Reseda's 91335 ZIP code. The median age was 35.5, and the median yearly household income was $53,842.

In 2008, the Los Angeles Times, Mapping L.A. project described Reseda as "highly diverse" ethnically within Los Angeles. The breakdown of the population using the 2000 census was 43.5% Latino; 37.2% Non-Hispanic white; 11.2% Asian; 4.2% black; and 3.9% other. Mexico (33.7%) and El Salvador (12.4%) were the most common birthplaces of the 43.1% of the residents who were born abroad.

In 2010, renters occupied 48.5% of the housing stock, and house or apartment-owners held 51.5%.

== Government and infrastructure ==
=== Local government ===
Los Angeles Fire Department Station 73 (Reseda) and Station 100 (West Van Nuys/Lake Balboa) serve the community.

The Los Angeles Police Department operates the nearby West Valley Community Police Station.

=== County, state, and federal ===
Mail services are provided by the United States Postal Service's branch post office at 7320 Reseda Boulevard. On October 14, 2006, the branch office was renamed the Coach John Wooden Post Office on Wooden's 96th birthday. Wooden lived in nearby Encino and his daughter lived in Reseda.

== Education ==
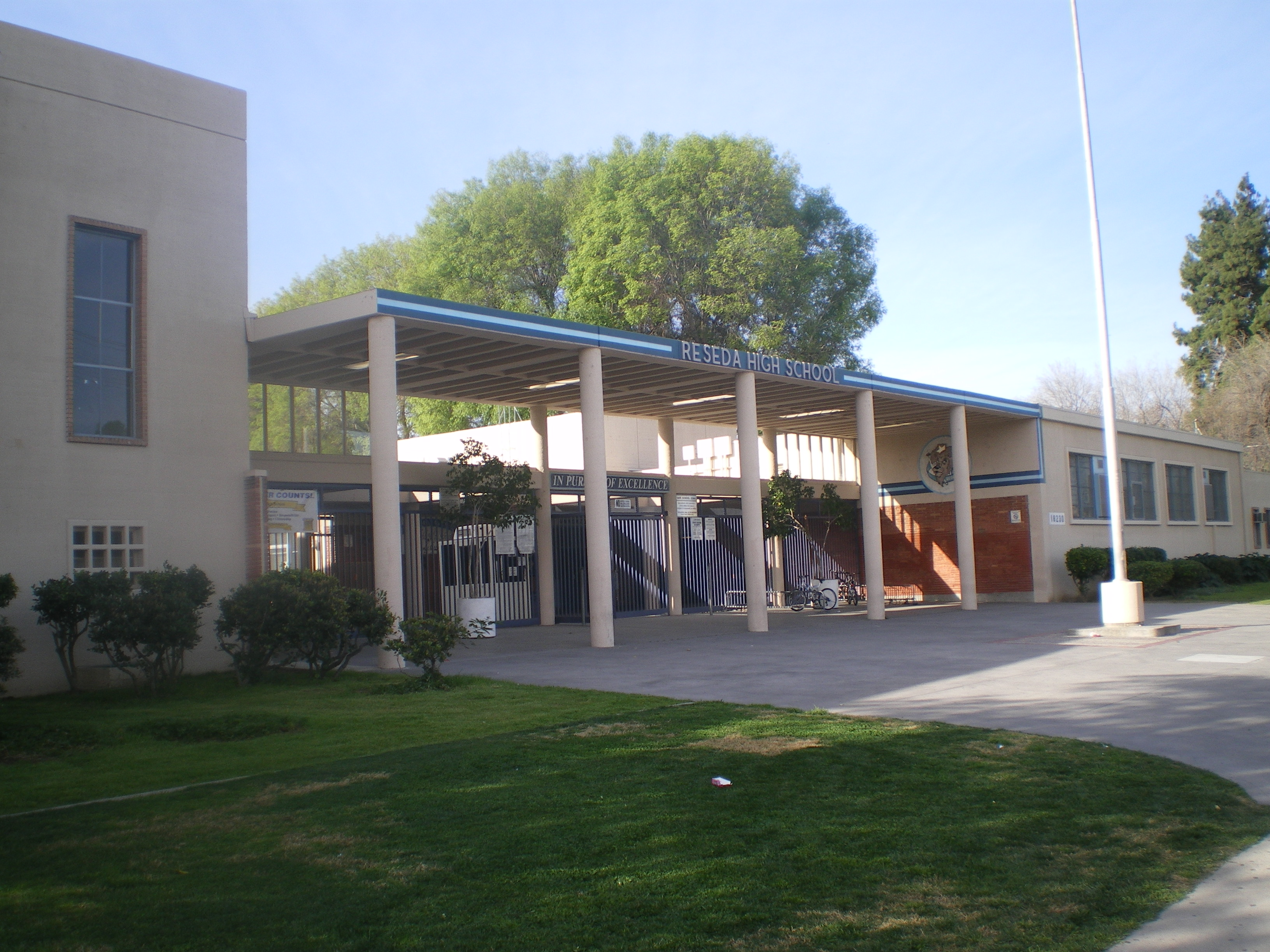
Reseda High School

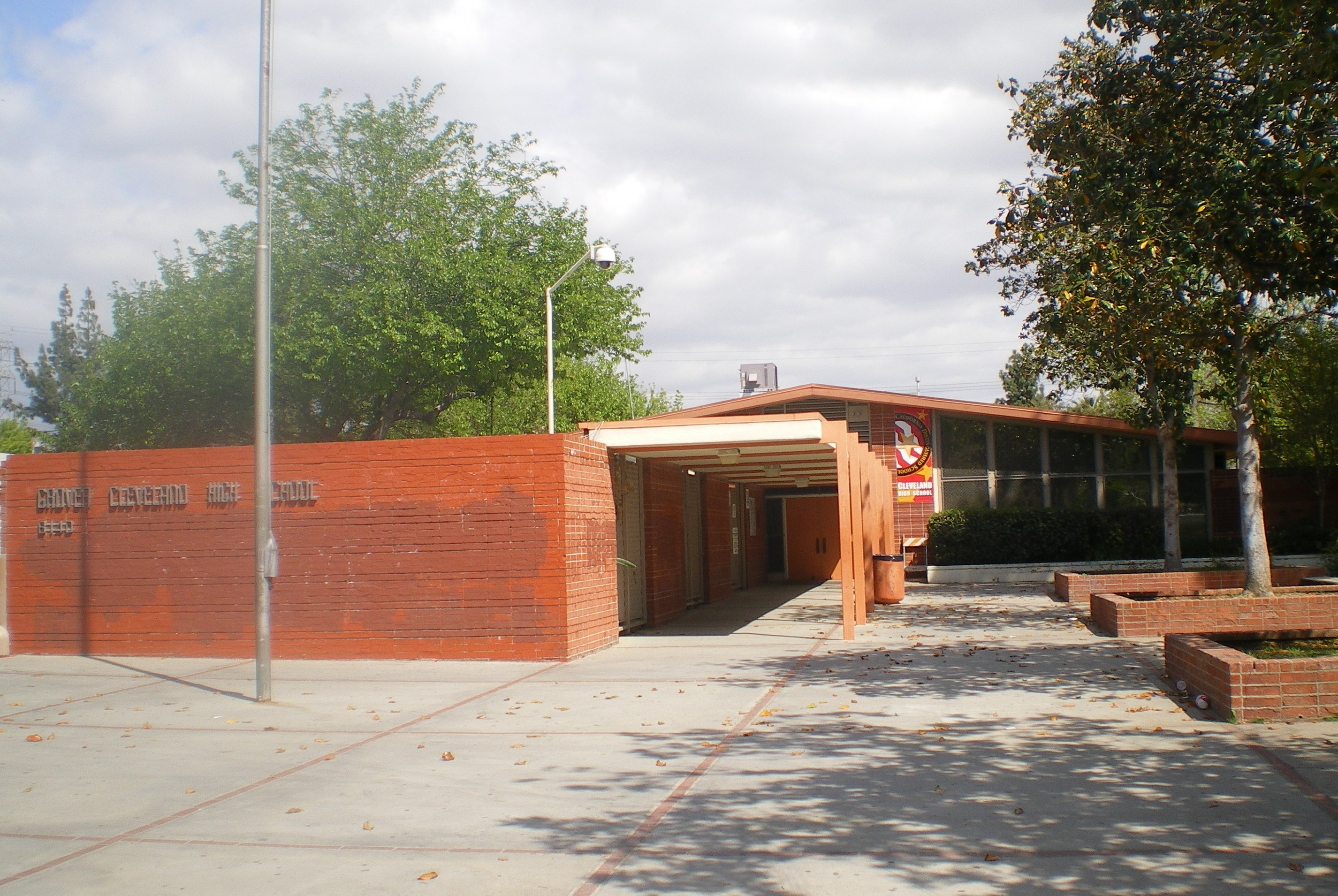
Grover Cleveland High School

Nineteen percent of Reseda residents 25 and older had earned a four-year degree by 2000, an average figure for both the city and the county. The proportion of residents with a high school diploma was high for the county.

Schools within the Reseda boundaries are:

=== Public ===
- Reseda High School, 18230 Kittridge Street
- Grover Cleveland High School, 8140 Vanalden Avenue
- Miller Career and Transition Center, special education, 8218 Vanalden Center
- Cantara Street Elementary School, 17950 Cantara Street
- Blythe Street Elementary School, 18730 Blythe Street
- John R. Wooden High School, continuation, 18741 Elkwood Street
- James Jordan Middle School, 18600 Lanark Street
- Melvin Avenue Elementary School, 7700 Melvin Avenue
- Garden Grove Elementary School, 18141 Valerio Street
- Sven Lokrantz Special Education Center, 19541 Wyandotte Street
- Reseda Elementary School, 7265 Amigo Avenue
- Magnolia Science Academy 1, 18238 Sherman Way
- Magnolia Science Academy 5, 18230 Kittridge Street
- Diane S. Leichman Special Education Center, 19034 Gault Street
- Bertrand Avenue Elementary School, 7021 Bertrand Avenue
- Reseda Community Adult School, 18230 Kittridge Street
- Newcastle Elementary School, 6520 Newcastle Avenue
- Shirley Avenue Elementary School, 19452 Hart Street

=== Private ===
- Applied Scholastics Academy Valley, 19000-A Saticoy Street
- Saint Catherine of Siena, 18125 Sherman Way
- Heart of the Valley Christian School, elementary, 18644 Sherman Way
- Kirk o' the Valley (Elementary) School, 19620 Vanowen Street
- Trinity Lutheran High School, 7357 Jordan Avenue

=== School closings ===
In 1982, the board considered closing Garden Grove Elementary School. In April 1983, an advisory committee of the Los Angeles Unified School District recommended closing eight schools, including Garden Grove School and Newcastle Avenue School. In August 1983, the board publicly considered closing Garden Grove, which had 176 students at the time, and Newcastle Avenue, which had 314 students. In 1984, the board voted to close the Garden Grove and Newcastle Avenue schools.

A decade after the schools closed, which occurred due to thousands of parents withdrawing their children from the Los Angeles Unified School District in the wake of mandatory busing, they were reopened. With the advent of class-size reduction becoming the priority, many parents began returning their children to the city's schools, and the number of newly arrived immigrants was boosting enrollments, officials said.

== Featured sites ==
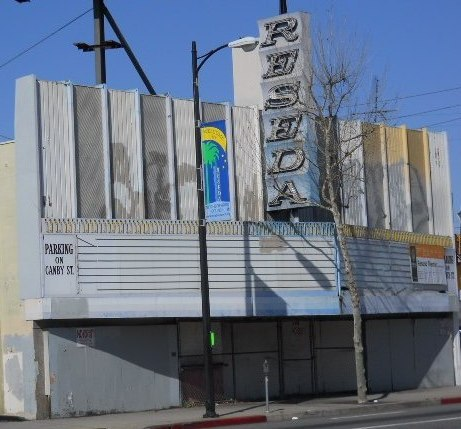
Reseda Theatre, March 2010

The Reseda Country Club was a well-known concert venue during the Los Angeles punk rock and new wave scenes of the 1980s. At the intersection of Canby Avenue and Sherman Way, the Country Club hosted bands, including Oingo Boingo, U2, Culture Club, Tom Petty & the Heartbreakers, and Roxy Music, from 1980 to 1982. The site began in the 1950s as one of the first Sav-On Drug stores in the San Fernando Valley, then became a nightclub, and remained a dancehall and music venue during the 1990s; it was also used as a boxing venue. It later became and remains a Spanish-language Christian church.

The Reseda Theater, at 18443 Sherman Way, was built in 1948 and closed in 1988. The exterior was briefly seen at the beginning of the film Boogie Nights.

== Parks and recreation ==
- Reseda Park and Recreation Center has barbecue pits, a baseball diamond, basketball courts, a children's play area, a community room, picnic tables, an outdoor unheated pool, table tennis, tennis courts, and volleyball courts. The Recreation Center offers a variety of sports programs and classes. Reseda Park also hosts an ornamental lake for fishing and a large duck pond. During the 1950s and 1960s, the duck pond also had a boathouse, where one could rent electric boats by the hour.
- Reseda Senior Multipurpose Center.
- Randal D. Simmons Park is a several acre park adjacent to the West Valley Regional Library. A tribute to officer Randal D. Simmons the park offers picnic grounds, walking, and jogging trails, shade trees, and a children's playground
- West Valley Family YMCA offers classes and has a soccer field, playground, daycare center, and swimming pool.
- Reseda Blvd. has the longest stretch of protected bike lanes in Southern California and hosted Ready for Reseda a Ciclavia event after opening in March 2024.
- Reseda Skate Rink opened on November 11, 2026 to the public. The facility is the only city owned ice rink in Los Angeles and offers indoor ice skating classes and recreational skating. The facility is managed by the LA Kings.

== Public libraries ==
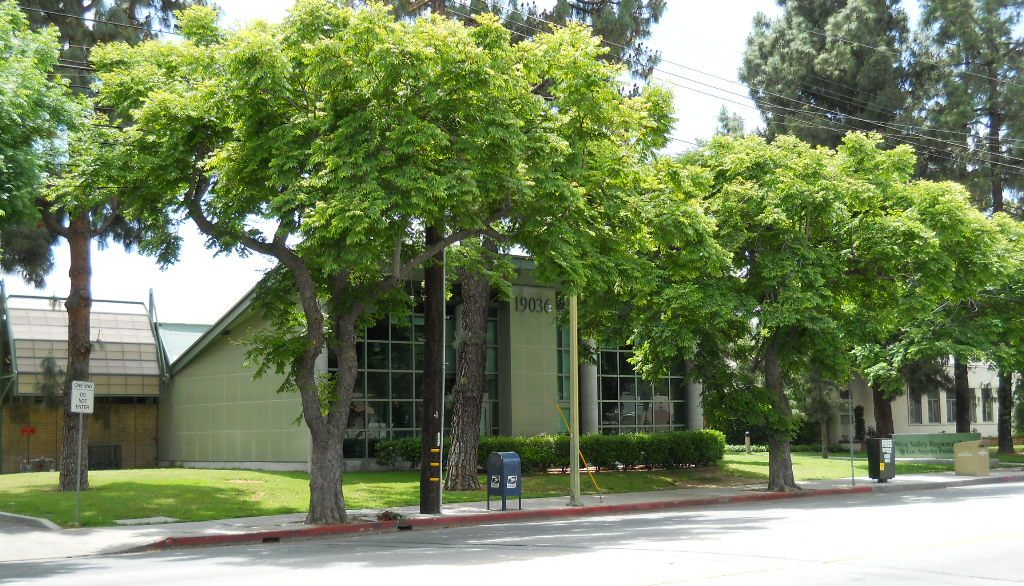
West Valley Regional Branch of Los Angeles Public Library, at 19036 Vanowen Street

The West Valley Regional Branch is operated by the Los Angeles Public Library.

== In popular culture ==
=== Films ===
A number of movies have been filmed or set in Reseda:

- Targets (1968) features the Reseda Drive-In Theatre (demolished in the mid-1970s) in a long sequence in which a deranged gunman hiding behind its screen goes on a killing spree, randomly shooting audience members as they sit in their cars. Other scenes offer various glimpses of Reseda and environs as they were in 1967, the year the film was made.
- In The Karate Kid (1984), Daniel LaRusso (Ralph Macchio) moves from Newark, New Jersey, to Reseda. In the follow-up television series Cobra Kai, the Cobra Kai dojo is set in Reseda, though the actual filming site for these scenes is Atlanta, Georgia.
- Tuff Turf (1985), Morgan Hiller (James Spader) is an intelligent but bullied teenager from Connecticut who relocates to Los Angeles with his strict mother and his father after his father's business goes under.
- In Terminator 2: Judgment Day (1991) when the T-1000 searches the computer in the squad car, John Connor's address appears as 19828 Almond Ave., Reseda.
- Some scenes in Falling Down (1993) were filmed in Reseda as William Foster (Michael Douglas) makes his way through the Valley.
- A Kid in King Arthur's Court (1995) places the home of the main character in Reseda. Both the beginning and ending scenes of the movie ostensibly take place on a Reseda baseball field.
- In Boogie Nights (1997), the nightclub scenes were filmed at The Country Club building.
- Several prominent scenes from Magnolia (1999) were filmed in Reseda.
- Erin Brockovich (2000) contains a number of scenes filmed in Reseda.
- Reseda Blvd (2014) contains scenes at Skateland and Reseda Park.

=== Music ===
Reseda is mentioned in numerous songs, including:

- Tom Petty's "Free Fallin'"
- Shivaree's "Reseda Casino". The band's lead singer Ambrosia Parsley was born in Reseda.
- Soul Coughing's "Screenwriter's Blues"
- The Mountain Goats' "High Doses #2".
- "Errol Flynn", written by Amanda McBroom and performed by Barbara Cook on Cook's 1994 album Live from London, contains a reference to Reseda as the hometown of the singer and her actor father.
- Frank Zappa and The Mothers of Invention's "Dummy Up" (1974), as well as Zappa's "The Blue Light" (1980), each contain a reference to the city.
- Captain Beefheart and His Magic Band's "Hair Pie: Bake 1" contains a reference to the city.
- No More Kings - Sweep the Leg (2007) music video contains a video reference to Daniel LaRusso Reseda South Seas Apartment 6:50 minutes into the video
- In 2008, leadoff track, "The Fool," on Old 97s album "Blame It on Gravity" contains the line, "He came from Reseda, deep in the valley."
- In 2012, Fernando Perdomo released "Postcards From Reseda". The album includes 10 instrumental songs named after Reseda streets.
- In 2019, Aaron West and the Roaring Twenties released "Rosa & Reseda".
- In 2023, Lana Del Rey released "Taco Truck x VB," which mentions Reseda.
- Hole Erth, the 2024 album by Toro y Moi, includes a song titled "Reseda".

=== Television ===
Television shows filmed in Reseda include:

- The show 10 Items or Less was filmed in Jons Marketplace, an actual grocery store in Reseda, and often used real customers as extras.
- The same store is the setting of the notable scene where Eleanor Shellstrop dies in The Good Place.
- The series American Dad! mentions Reseda in an episode titled Surro-Gate. The lesbian couple in the episode explain that the reason why they left Reseda was supposedly to change the minds of people who disagreed with their beliefs.
- In a season-three episode of Angel, titled "Birthday", Cordelia's vision leads her to visit a girl who lives in Reseda.
- The show My Name Is Earl often was filmed in Reseda, captured to look like rural small-town America.
- In the season-seven episode of The X-Files titled "First Person Shooter", Mulder and Scully question a suspect who was picked up "outside a strip club in Reseda".
- In the web series Cobra Kai (a follow-up to The Karate Kid), Johnny Lawrence's dojo is located at a strip mall in Reseda.

=== Sporting events ===
- Between February 2008 and May 2018, professional wrestling company Pro Wrestling Guerrilla held all but three of their events in American Legion Post #308 in Reseda.

== Notable people ==
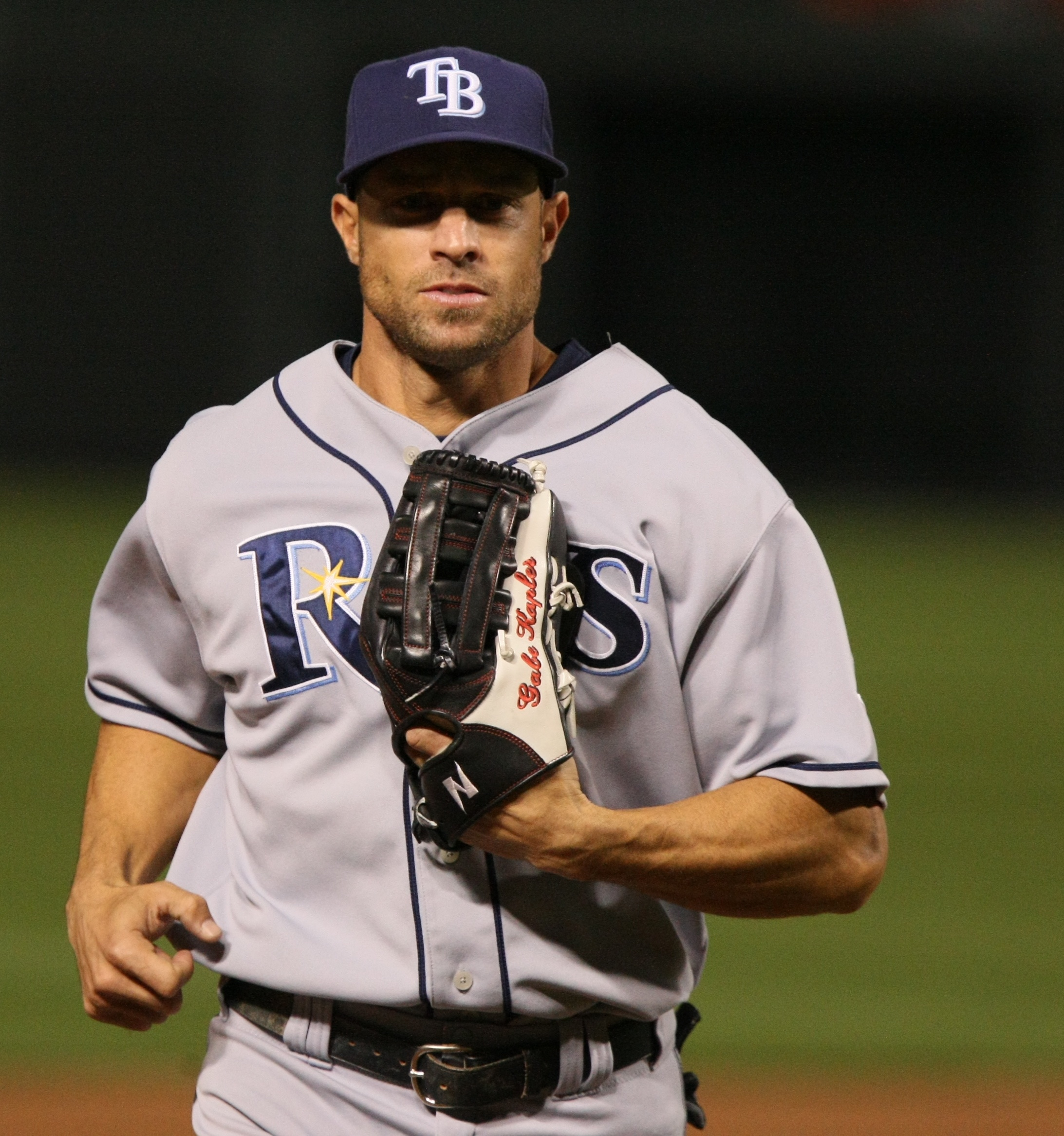
Gabe Kapler

- Martin Donovan (born 1957), film, stage, and television actor
- Agustin Cazarez (born 1989), soccer player
- Gabe Kapler (born 1976), Major League Baseball outfielder, and manager (San Francisco Giants)
- Kyle (born 1993), rapper, singer, songwriter, and actor
- Eric Rupe (born 1963), professional BMX racer
- Donald D. Lorenzen (1920–1980), Los Angeles City Council member, 1969–77
- Jim Robinson (1946–1995), racing driver
- Fredo Santana (1990–2018), rapper
- Zachary "Kid Yamaka" Wohlman (born 1988), professional boxer
- Ana Kasparian (born 1986), political commentator
- Corey Feldman (born 1971), actor

== See also ==
- Filmation
