= I Oughtta Give You a Shot in the Head for Making Me Live in This Dump =

Studio album by Shivaree
- Released: 19 October 1999
- Length: 41:25
- Label: Capitol
- Producer: Joe Henry, Tony Mangurian, Danny McGough

Shivaree chronology
I Oughtta Give You a Shot in the Head for Making Me Live in This Dump (1999)	Rough Dreams (2002)

Alternative cover

Professional ratings
Review scores
Source	Rating
AllMusic	3/5 stars

I Oughtta Give You a Shot in the Head for Making Me Live in This Dump is the debut album by American alternative rock band Shivaree, released by Capitol Records in 1999. It contains the song "Goodnight Moon", which appears on the soundtrack to the 2004 film Kill Bill: Volume 2.

== Track listing ==
1. "Cannibal King" (Frank Ebb, Paul Klein, Larry Coleman) – 0:48
2. "Bossa Nova" (Ambrosia Parsley) – 3:28
3. "Daring Lousy Guy" (Parsley, Duke McVinnie) – 4:15
4. "Arlington Girl" (Parsley, Greg Lastrapes) – 6:58
5. "Oh, No" (Tracy Thielen) – 3:23
6. "Lunch" (Parsley) – 4:44
7. "Goodnight Moon" (Parsley, McVinnie) – 4:04
8. "I Don't Care" (Parsley, McVinnie, Mia Sharp) – 4:38
9. "Pimp" (Parsley, McVinnie, Danny McGough) – 3:31
10. "Idiot Waltz" (Parsley, McVinnie) – 3:02
11. "Ash Wednesday" (Parsley) – 0:51
12. "Arrivederci" (Parsley) – 1:44

== Personnel ==
- Ambrosia Parsley – Vocals
- Duke McVinnie – Guitar
- Danny McGough – Keyboards

== Charts ==
Chart (2000)	Peak position
French Albums (SNEP)	37
Italian Albums (FIMI)	7

== Certifications and sales ==
Region	Certification	Certified units/sales
France (SNEP)	Gold	100,000^{*}
Italy (FIMI)	Platinum	130,000
^{*} Sales figures based on certification alone.
