= Pierce College =

Pierce College may refer to:

- Pierce College (Washington)
- Los Angeles Pierce College
  - Pierce College station

== See also ==
- Peirce College
- Franklin Pierce University
