= Northridge Hospital Medical Center =

Hospital in Los Angeles, California, United States

Coordinates: 34.2207°N 118.5318°W

- Dignity Health
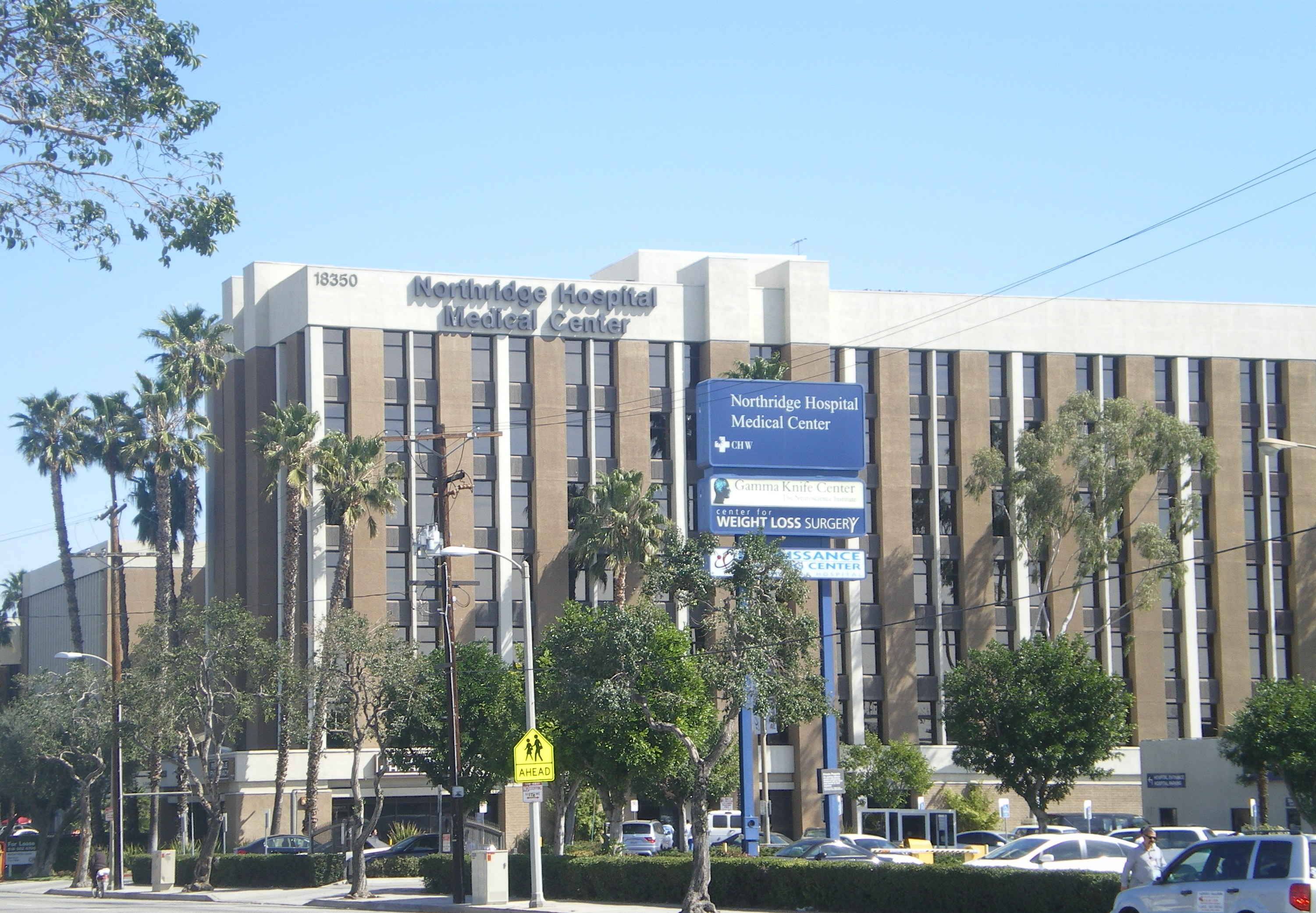

Geography
- Location: 18300 Roscoe Boulevard, Reseda, Los Angeles, California, United States

Organization
- Care system: Private
- Type: Community
- Affiliated university: None

Services
- Emergency department: Level II trauma center
- Beds: 425

History
- Founded: 1955

Links
- Website: http://www.northridgehospital.org
- Lists: Hospitals in California

Northridge Hospital Medical Center is a hospital in the Reseda district of Los Angeles, California, US.

== History ==
The hospital was founded in 1955 by Dr. Frederick Gruneck as a 49-bed hospital with one emergency room. In 1979 Northridge Hospital and Valley Hospital in Van Nuys created a joint parent company – HealthWest. HealthWest expanded to become a multi-hospital nonprofit. In 1988, HealthWest merged with the Lutheran Hospital Society of Southern California, the parent company of California Hospital Medical Center, to form UniHealth.

The hospital was at the epicenter of the 1994 Northridge earthquake, but remained open to treat over 1,000 patients in the 48 hours following the earthquake. In 1995, Valley Hospital was merged into Northridge Hospital. UniHealth struggled financially in the 1990s after acquiring physician groups in difficulties, and in 1998, UniHealth sold its hospitals to Catholic Healthcare West. CHW became Dignity Health in 2012.

Northridge Hospital was the site where legendary Los Angeles Lakers broadcaster Chick Hearn was pronounced dead on August 5, 2002, after suffering a fall three days earlier.

== Services ==
The emergency department at Northridge Hospital Medical Center is one of only two in the San Fernando Valley that is certified as a trauma center and the only one that is a certified PEDIATRIC trauma center. The Thomas and Dorothy Leavey Cancer Center is also located at the hospital.
