= Goodnight Moon (song) =

2000 single by Shivaree

Single by Shivaree

from the album I Oughtta Give You a Shot...
- B-side: "Scrub", "My Boy Lollipop"
- Released: March 28, 2000
- Length: 4:04
- Label: Odeon, Capitol
- Songwriters: Ambrosia Parsley, Duke McVinnie
- Producers: Tom Rothrock, Rob Schnapf

Shivaree singles chronology
"Goodnight Moon" (2000)	"Bossa Nova" (1999)

Audio
- "Goodnight Moon" on YouTube

"Goodnight Moon" is a song by American alternative rock band Shivaree, written by Ambrosia Parsley and Duke McVinnie. It is the seventh track on the band's debut album, I Oughtta Give You a Shot in the Head for Making Me Live in This Dump (1999), and was released as the band's debut single on March 24, 2000. The song reached number 12 on the US Billboard Triple-A chart, topped the Italian Singles Chart, and entered the top 30 in France. Shivaree have not had another such hit, making them a one-hit wonder.

== Track listings ==
Italian and UK CD single

1. "Goodnight Moon" – 4:05
2. "Scrub" – 5:50
3. "My Boy Lollipop" – 2:30

French CD single

1. "Goodnight Moon" – 4:04
2. "Scrub" – 5:47

== Charts ==
Chart (2000–2001)	Peak position
Europe (Eurochart Hot 100)	65
France (SNEP)	22
Germany (GfK)	74
Italy (FIMI)	1
Netherlands (Single Top 100)	95
Switzerland (Schweizer Hitparade)	74
UK Singles (OCC)	63
US Triple-A (Billboard)	12

== Release history ==
Region	Date	Format(s)	Label(s)	Ref(s).
United States	March 28, 2000	Alternative radio	Odeon; Capitol	
United States	May 22, 2000	Adult contemporary; hot adult contemporary radio	Odeon; Capitol	
United Kingdom	October 23, 2000	CD	Odeon; Capitol	
United Kingdom (re-release)	February 5, 2001	CD	Odeon; Capitol	
