= De Soto Avenue =

Arterial road in Los Angeles's San Fernando Valley

- Namesake: Hernando de Soto
- Maintained by: Bureau of Street Services, Los Angeles Department of Water and Power
- Length: 7.5 mi (12.1 km)
- Nearest metro station: De Soto
- North end: Browns Canyon Road in Chatsworth
- Major junctions: SR 118; US 101
- South end: Ventura Boulevard in Woodland Hills

De Soto Avenue is a north–south arterial road that runs for 7.5 miles (12.1 km) between US 101 and SR 118 in the San Fernando Valley in Los Angeles, California.

== Name ==
De Soto Avenue was named after Hernando de Soto, a Spanish explorer who led the first European expedition into the southeastern United States. Several of the San Fernando Valley's north–south streets were originally named after historic explorers, including De Soto, Balboa, Alvarado, Cabrillo, Cortez, and Diaz, but De Soto Avenue and Balboa Boulevard are the only street names that remain.

== Route ==
De Soto travels north–south between US 101 and SR 118, across almost the entire San Fernando Valley. From north to south, De Soto travels from Chatsworth, through Canoga Park and Winnetka (the street marks the border between these two neighborhoods), and into Woodland Hills. The entire street is four or more lanes.

== Transit ==
Metro Local Line 244 runs along De Soto Avenue between Devonshire Street and Ventura Boulevard.

The G Line's De Soto station is located at De Soto Avenue and Victory Boulevard in Woodland Hills.

== Notable landmarks ==
Notable landmarks on De Soto include (from north to south): Quimby Park, Warner Center Corporate Park, and Kaiser Permanente Woodland Hills Medical Center.

Schools on De Soto Avenue include (from north to south): Sierra Canyon School, Chatsworth High School, Multicultural Learning Center, Pierce College, and Woodland Hills Academy.
