= De Soto station =

De Soto
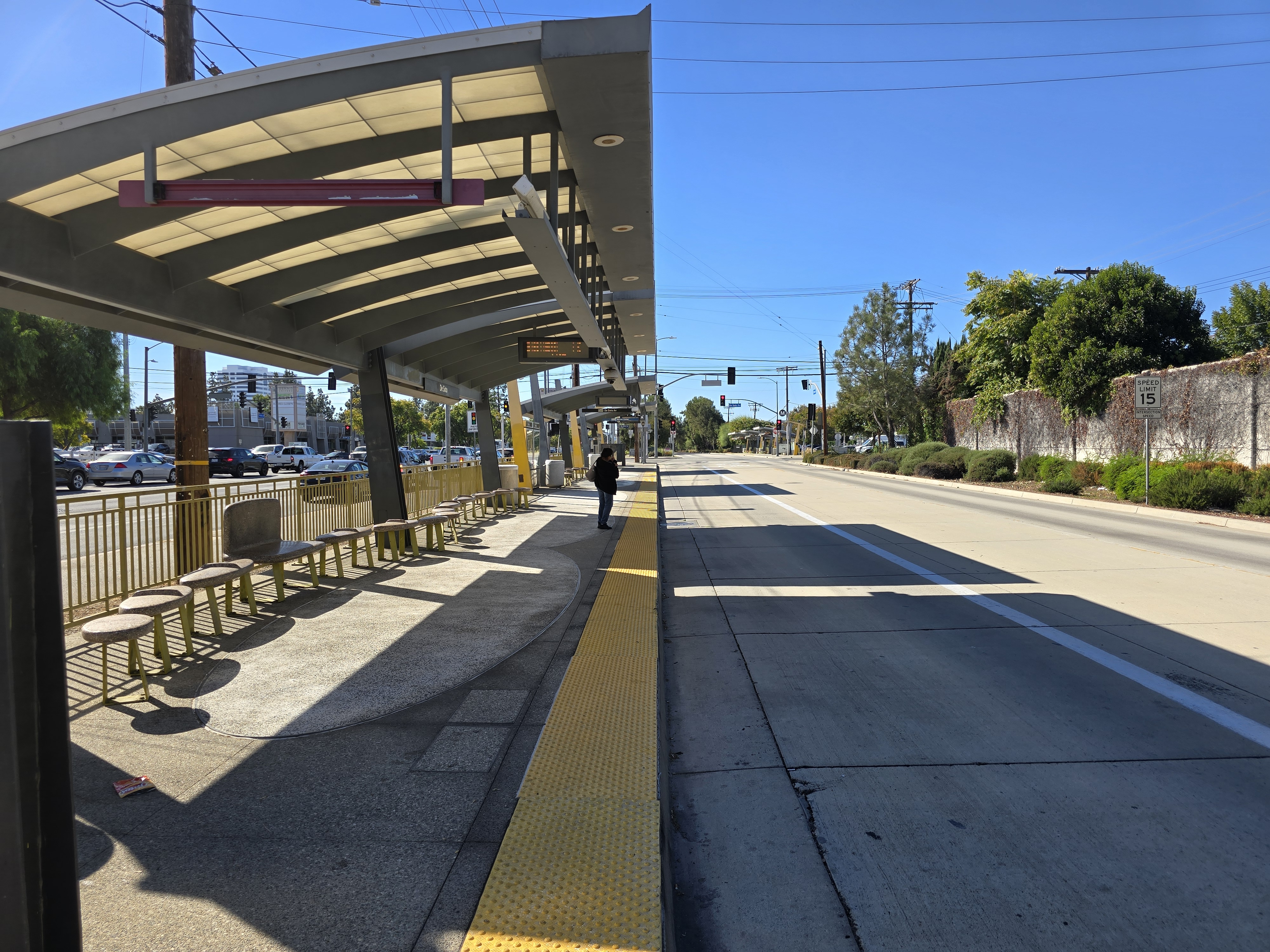
- Both platforms of De Soto Station with the eastbound platform in the foreground, October 2024

General information
- Location: 20851 & 20901 Victory Boulevard; Los Angeles, California
- Coordinates: 34.1886°N 118.5884°W
- Owner: Los Angeles County Metropolitan Transportation Authority
- Platforms: 2 side platforms
- Connections: Los Angeles Metro Bus; City of Santa Clarita Transit; VCTC Intercity

Construction
- Cycle facilities: Racks and lockers
- Accessible: Yes

History
- Opened: October 29, 2005

Passengers
- FY 2025: 294 (avg. wkdy boardings)

Services
Preceding station	Metro Busway	Following station
Canoga toward Chatsworth	G Line	Pierce College toward North Hollywood
Location

De Soto station is a station on the G Line of the Los Angeles Metro Busway system. The station is next to Victory Boulevard, which parallels that section of the Orange Line. It is located in the western San Fernando Valley near the meeting of three largely residential municipal communities of the City of Los Angeles: Canoga Park, Winnetka, and Woodland Hills.

It is named after De Soto Avenue, which travels north-south and crosses the east-west busway route, and is, in turn, named after Hernando de Soto, the conquistador who led the first European expedition into the southeastern United States. De Soto did not explore California, despite the location of the station and avenue.

Counting from the western terminus in Chatsworth, it is the sixth station on the Orange Line.

== Service ==
=== Hours and frequency ===
G Line buses run 24 hours a day. Buses operate every eight minutes during peak hours on weekdays. They operate every ten minutes during the daytime on weekdays and most of the day on weekends. Night service on all days is every 20 minutes.

=== Connections ===
As of January 19, 2025, the following connections are available:

- City of Santa Clarita Transit: 796
- Los Angeles Metro Bus: 164, 244
- VCTC Intercity: Conejo Connection
