= Pierce College station =

Bus rapid transit station in Los Angeles, California

Pierce College/Winnetka
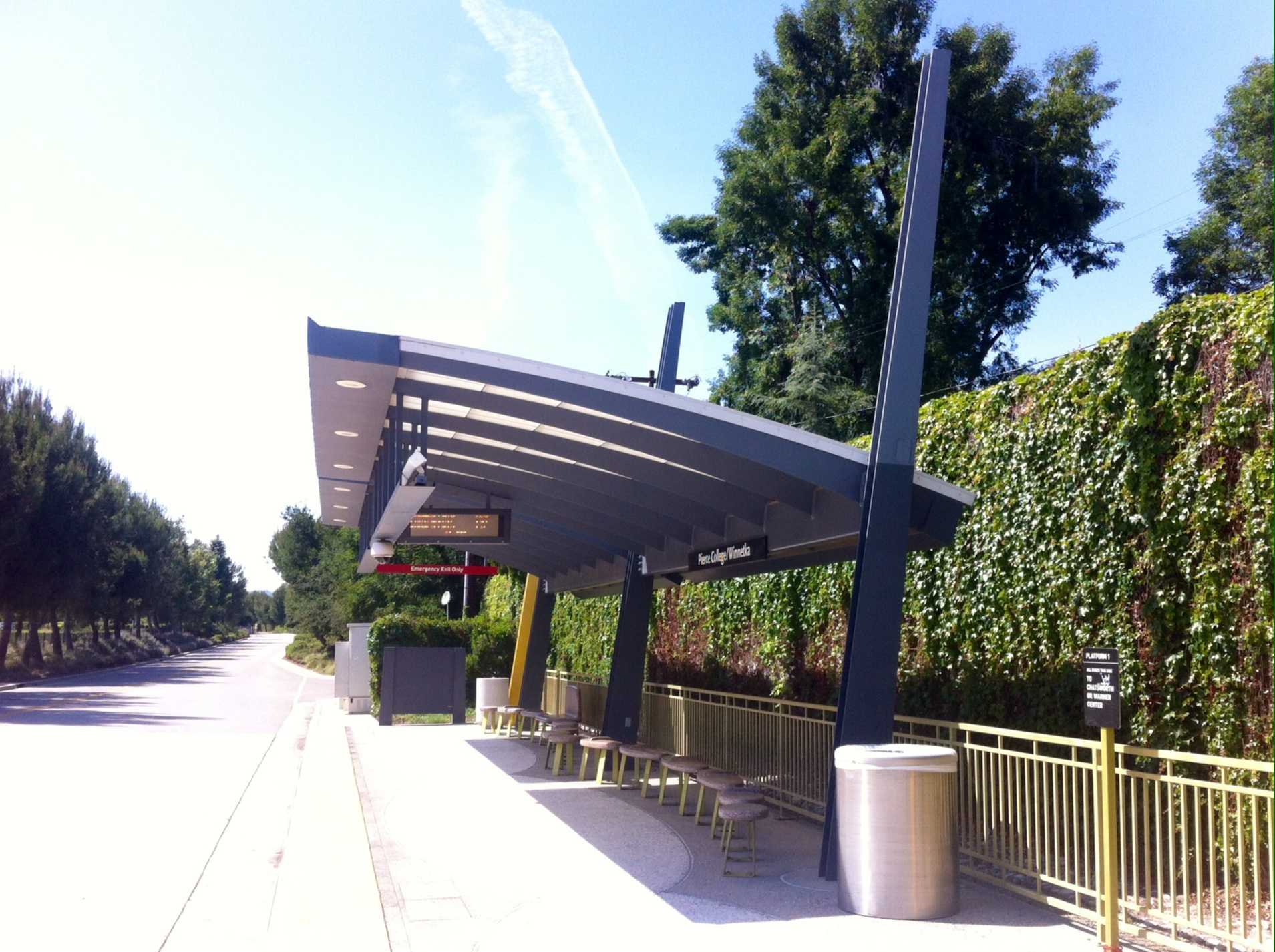
- Pierce College station platform in 2015

General information
- Location: 6424 & 6425 Winnetka Avenue; Los Angeles, California
- Coordinates: 34.1872°N 118.5710°W
- Owner: Los Angeles County Metropolitan Transportation Authority
- Platforms: 2 side platforms
- Connections: Los Angeles Metro Bus

Construction
- Parking: 392 spaces
- Cycle facilities: Racks and lockers
- Accessible: Yes

History
- Opened: October 29, 2005

Passengers
- FY 2025: 388 (avg. wkdy boardings)

Services
Preceding station	Metro Busway	Following station
De Soto toward Chatsworth	G Line	Tampa toward North Hollywood
Location

Pierce College station (signed as Pierce College/Winnetka) is a station on the G Line of the Los Angeles Metro Busway system. It is named after the adjacent community college of the same name, which is located on Winnetka Avenue, immediately across Victory Boulevard from the station. The station is located in the Los Angeles neighborhood of Winnetka.

== Service ==
=== Hours and frequency ===
G Line buses run 24 hours a day. Buses operate every eight minutes during peak hours on weekdays. They operate every ten minutes during the daytime on weekdays and most of the day on weekends. Night service on all days is every 20 minutes.

=== Connections ===
As of January 19, 2025, the following connections are available:

- Los Angeles Metro Bus: 164, 243

== Nearby destinations ==
The station is within walking distance of the following notable places:

- G Line Bikeway
- Los Angeles Pierce College
- West Valley Occupational Center
