= Sherman Way station =

Bus rapid transit station Los Angeles, California

Sherman Way
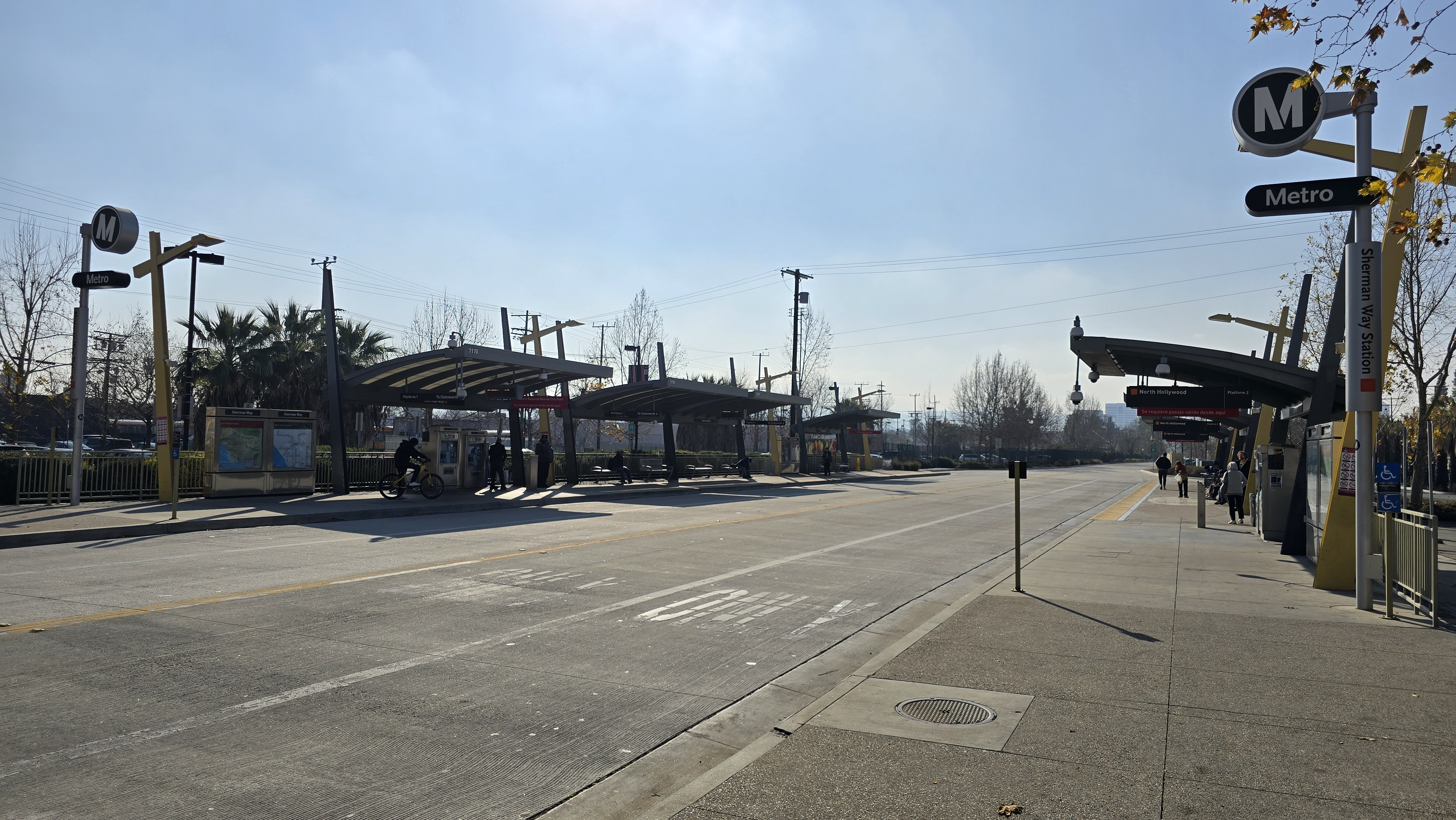
- Sherman Way station in 2025

General information
- Location: 21384 Sherman Way; Los Angeles, California
- Coordinates: 34.20095°N 118.59746°W
- Owner: Los Angeles County Metropolitan Transportation Authority
- Platforms: 2 side platforms
- Connections: Los Angeles Metro Bus

Construction
- Parking: 207 spaces
- Cycle facilities: Racks and lockers
- Accessible: Yes

History
- Opened: June 30, 2012

Passengers
- FY 2025: 704 (avg. wkdy boardings)

Services
Preceding station	Metro Busway	Following station
Roscoe toward Chatsworth	G Line	Canoga toward North Hollywood
Location

Sherman Way station is a station on the G Line of the Los Angeles Metro Busway system located at Sherman Way in downtown Canoga Park – a community of Los Angeles in the western San Fernando Valley. The station is in service on the Metro G Line Chatsworth Extension. It opened in June 2012.

Sherman Way station is located on the intersection of Canoga Avenue and Sherman Way. The station features similar station amenities as the existing Orange Line stations. Station art is added to the station.

It has a parking lot with 207 spaces along with bicycle lockers.

== History ==
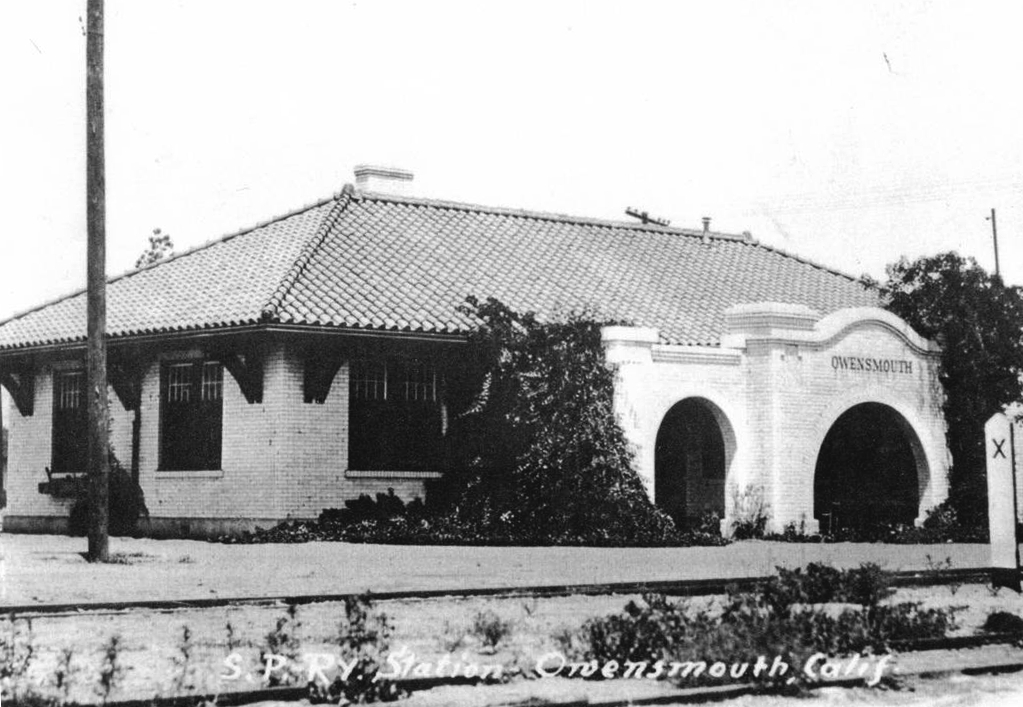
Owensmouth station, later Canoga Park, c. 1915

Southern Pacific built their Canoga Park station along the Burbank branch in 1912. The station building was on the north side of Sherman Way. The same year, the Pacific Electric Owensmouth Line was completed to Owensmouth, crossing the tracks at Sherman Way. Southern Pacific ceased passenger service on the line in 1920, and Pacific Electric stopped running cars here after 1938. The old station building was designated a Los Angeles Historic-Cultural Monument in May 1990, three years before the structure was destroyed in a fire.

The Orange Line was constructed over the former Burbank branch, with bus rapid transit service starting at the newly built station on June 30, 2012.

Sherman Way is named after General Moses Sherman, due to his land development and rail lines he built in the valley.

== Service ==
=== Hours and frequency ===
G Line buses run 24 hours a day. Buses operate every eight minutes during peak hours on weekdays. They operate every ten minutes during the daytime on weekdays and most of the day on weekends. Night service on all days is every 20 minutes.

=== Connections ===
As of January 19, 2025, the following connections are available:

- Los Angeles Metro Bus: 162

== Nearby destinations ==
The station is within walking distance of the following notable places:

- Downtown Canoga Park shops, antiques row
- Madrid Theater
