= Roscoe station =

Bus rapid transit station in Los Angeles, California

Roscoe
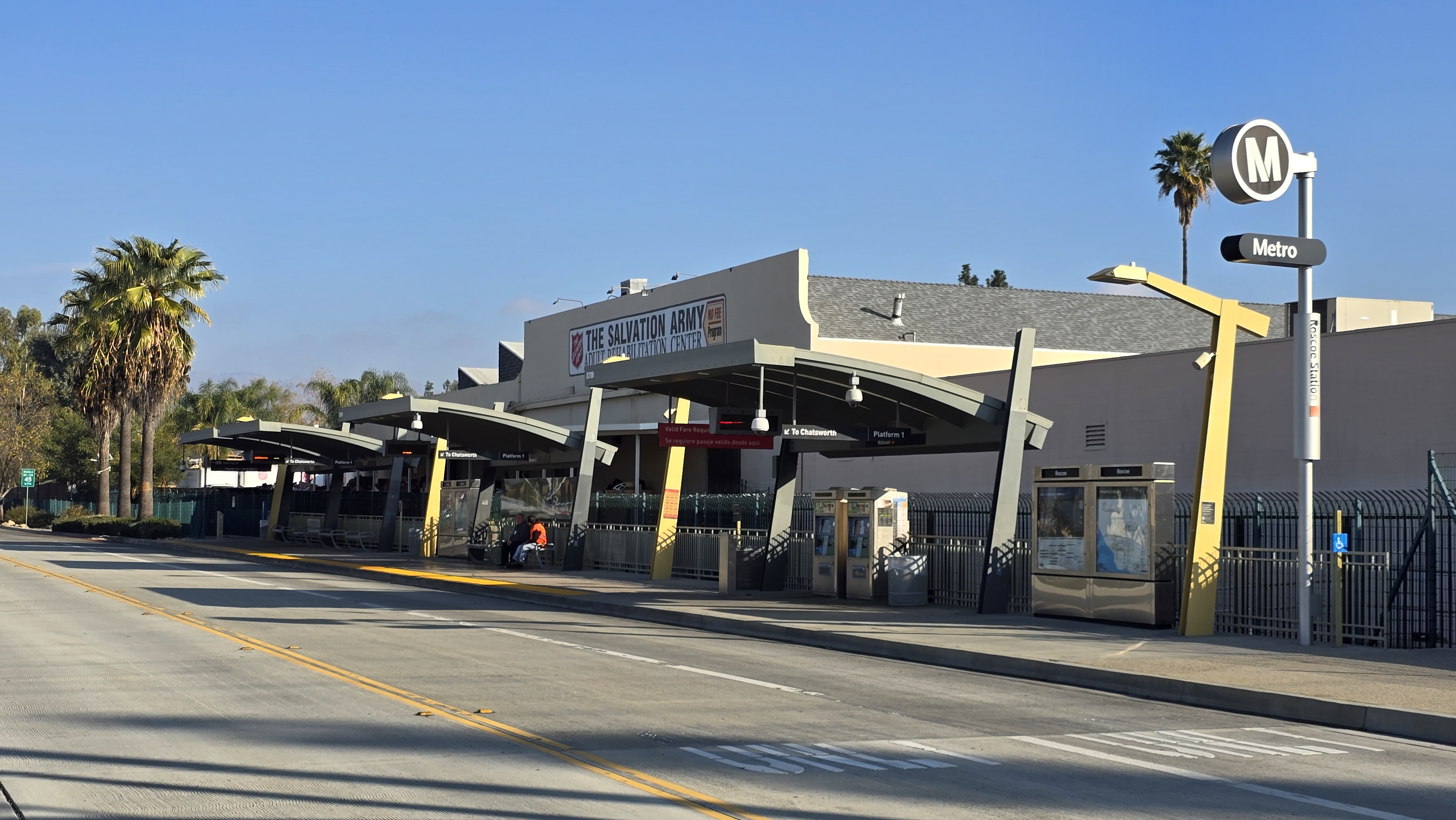
- Roscoe station in 2025

General information
- Location: 21386 Roscoe Boulevard; Los Angeles, California
- Coordinates: 34.21972°N 118.59692°W
- Owner: Los Angeles County Metropolitan Transportation Authority
- Platforms: 2 side platforms
- Connections: Los Angeles Metro Bus

Construction
- Cycle facilities: Racks and lockers
- Accessible: Yes

History
- Opened: June 30, 2012

Passengers
- FY 2025: 462 (avg. wkdy boardings)

Services
Preceding station	Metro Busway	Following station
Nordhoff toward Chatsworth	G Line	Sherman Way toward North Hollywood
Location

Roscoe station is a station on the G Line of the Los Angeles Metro Busway system located in Canoga Park in the western San Fernando Valley, it opened in June 2012. It is part of the Los Angeles Metro Busway system. The station is currently in service as part of the Metro Orange Line Chatsworth Extension. The station has bicycle lockers. A parking lot was not planned for this station.

The station is located at the intersection of Canoga Avenue and Roscoe Boulevard. The station features similar station amenities like the existing Orange Line Stations. Additionally, station art is added to the station.

== Service ==
=== Hours and frequency ===
G Line buses run 24 hours a day. Buses operate every eight minutes during peak hours on weekdays. They operate every ten minutes during the daytime on weekdays and most of the day on weekends. Night service on all days is every 20 minutes.

=== Connections ===
As of January 19, 2025, the following connections are available:

- Los Angeles Metro Bus: 152
