= Sherman Way =

Arterial road in Los Angeles's San Fernando Valley

- The Way
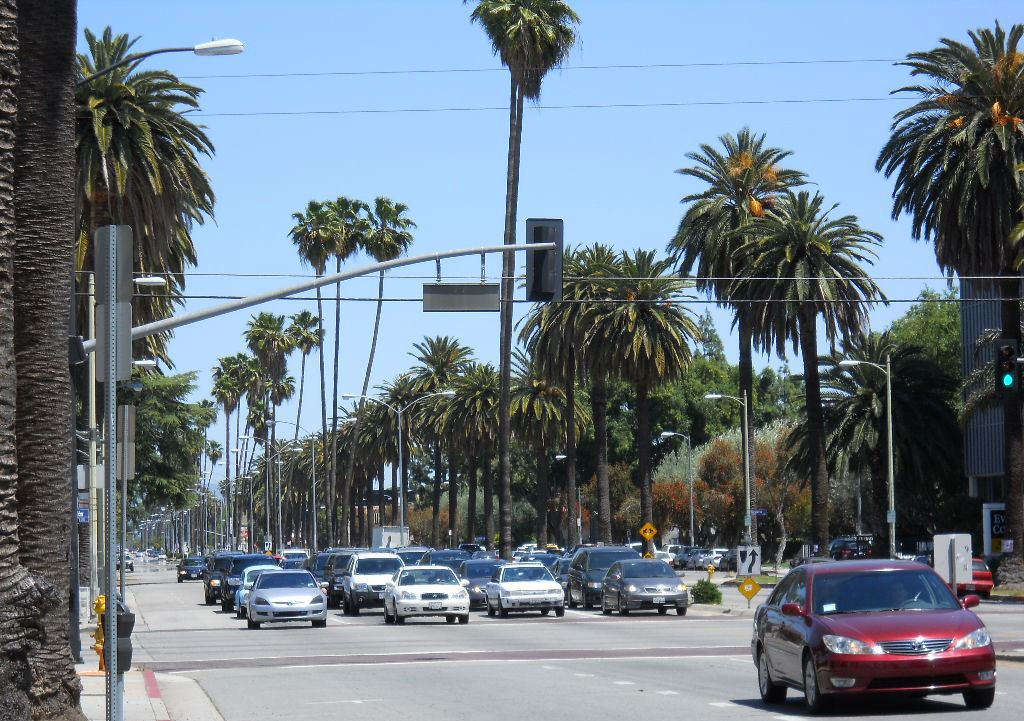
- Sherman Way in Reseda
- Interactive map of Sherman Way
- Namesake: Moses Hazeltine Sherman
- Maintained by: Bureau of Street Services, Los Angeles Department of Water and Power
- Length: 16 mi (26 km)
- Nearest metro station: Sherman Way
- West end: Platt Ave. in West Hills
- Major junctions: SR 27; I-405; SR 170
- East end: North Clybourn Avenue at Hollywood Burbank Airport in Burbank

Sherman Way, nicknamed "The Way", is a major east–west arterial road that runs for 16 miles (26 km) across the San Fernando Valley in Los Angeles and Burbank, California.

== Name ==
Sherman Way was named after Moses Hazeltine Sherman, a major developer in early Los Angeles. Sherman Way intersects with Hazeltine Avenue, another street named for him.

Due to Sherman Way's prominence as a thoroughfare through the Valley, it is sometimes referred to simply as "The Way". Businesses and organizations with a Sherman Way street address sometimes name themselves to indicate that they are "on the Way", such as The Church on the Way in Van Nuys. This trend is intended to evoke the English phrase "on the way".

== Route ==
Sherman Way travels east–west across almost the entire San Fernando Valley. From west to east, it travels from West Hills, through Canoga Park, Winnetka, Reseda, Van Nuys, North Hollywood, and Sun Valley, and into Burbank. The majority of the street is four lanes, and much of it contains a median strip.

Sherman Way travels under Van Nuys Airport via the Sherman Way Tunnel, and the street's eastern terminus is at Hollywood Burbank Airport. The street however does not provide direct access to either airport.

== Transit ==
Metro Local Line 162 runs along Sherman Way and the G Line's Sherman Way station is located at Sherman Way and Canoga Avenue in Canoga Park.

The East San Fernando Valley Light Rail Transit Project plans to have a stop at Sherman Way and Van Nuys Boulevard in Van Nuys.

== Notable landmarks ==
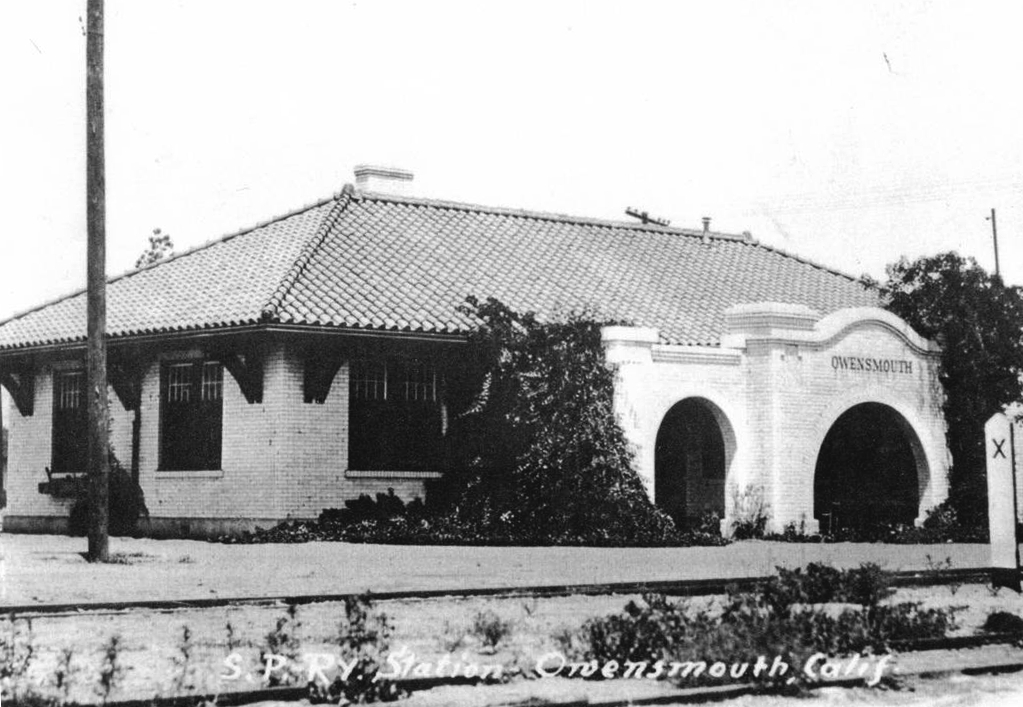
Owensmouth station, later Canoga Park, c. 1915

Two Los Angeles Cultural-Historic Monuments (Canoga Mission Gallery and Lederer Residence and Immediate Environments) are located on Sherman Way, and two additional monuments (Pacific Electric Picover Railway Station and Canoga Park (originally Owensmouth) Southern Pacific Railroad Station) were located on Sherman Way before they were destroyed.

Other notable landmarks on Sherman Way include (from west to east): UCLA West Valley Medical Center, Canoga Park Branch Library, Van Nuys Airport, Valley Plaza Sports Complex, and Hollywood Burbank Airport.

Schools on Sherman Way include Magnolia Science Academy 1 and Heart of the Valley Christian School.
