= John R. Wooden High School =

Location
- 18741 Elkwood St. Reseda, California 91335; 34.212933°N 118.54164°W

Information
- Type: Public
- Principal: Laura Novak
- Enrollment: 102 (2023-2024)
- Website: Official Website

John R. Wooden High School is a public continuation high school in the Reseda neighborhood of the San Fernando Valley, Los Angeles, California, within the Los Angeles Unified School District.

== History ==
Aliso High School was renamed John R. Wooden High School in 2004, in honor of UCLA basketball coach John Wooden.
