= Warner Center station =

Intercity bus station in Los Angeles, California

Warner Center
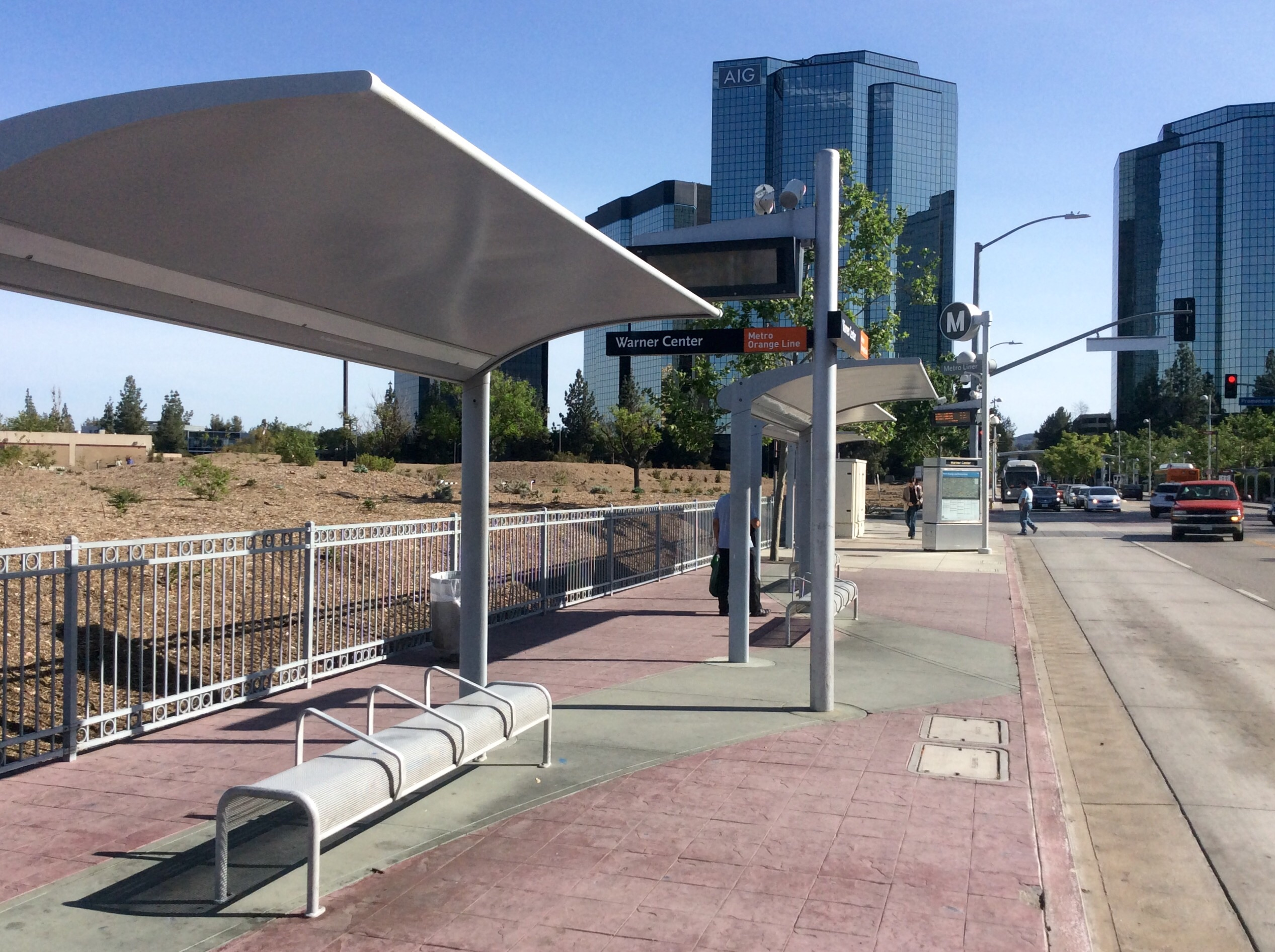
- Warner Center station platform in 2015 while still part of the Orange Line

General information
- Location: 6101 1/2 Owensmouth Avenue; Los Angeles, California
- Coordinates: 34.1804°N 118.6014°W
- Owner: Los Angeles County Metropolitan Transportation Authority
- Bus stands: 6

Construction
- Cycle facilities: Racks
- Accessible: yes

History
- Opened: October 29, 2005
- Closed: June 24, 2018 (Orange Line)
Former services
Preceding station	Metro Busway	Following station
Terminus	G Line	Canoga toward North Hollywood
Location

Warner Center station is an intercity bus station and former bus rapid transit station in the eponymous commercial development in the Woodland Hills neighborhood of the San Fernando Valley in Los Angeles, California, United States.

When service began on the Orange Line (now the G Line) in 2005, Warner Center was the western terminus, and the only stop not on the dedicated busway. In 2012 an extension of the Orange Line opened to Chatsworth station, leaving Warner Center on a one-stop stub served by alternate buses.

Service to Warner Center station on the Orange Line ended on June 24, 2018, replaced by a shuttle that stopped in several locations around the Warner Center area before offering passengers a transfer to the Orange Line at Canoga station, running every 10 minutes.

The station remains standing as a transit hub for the area and is now served by several other bus lines.

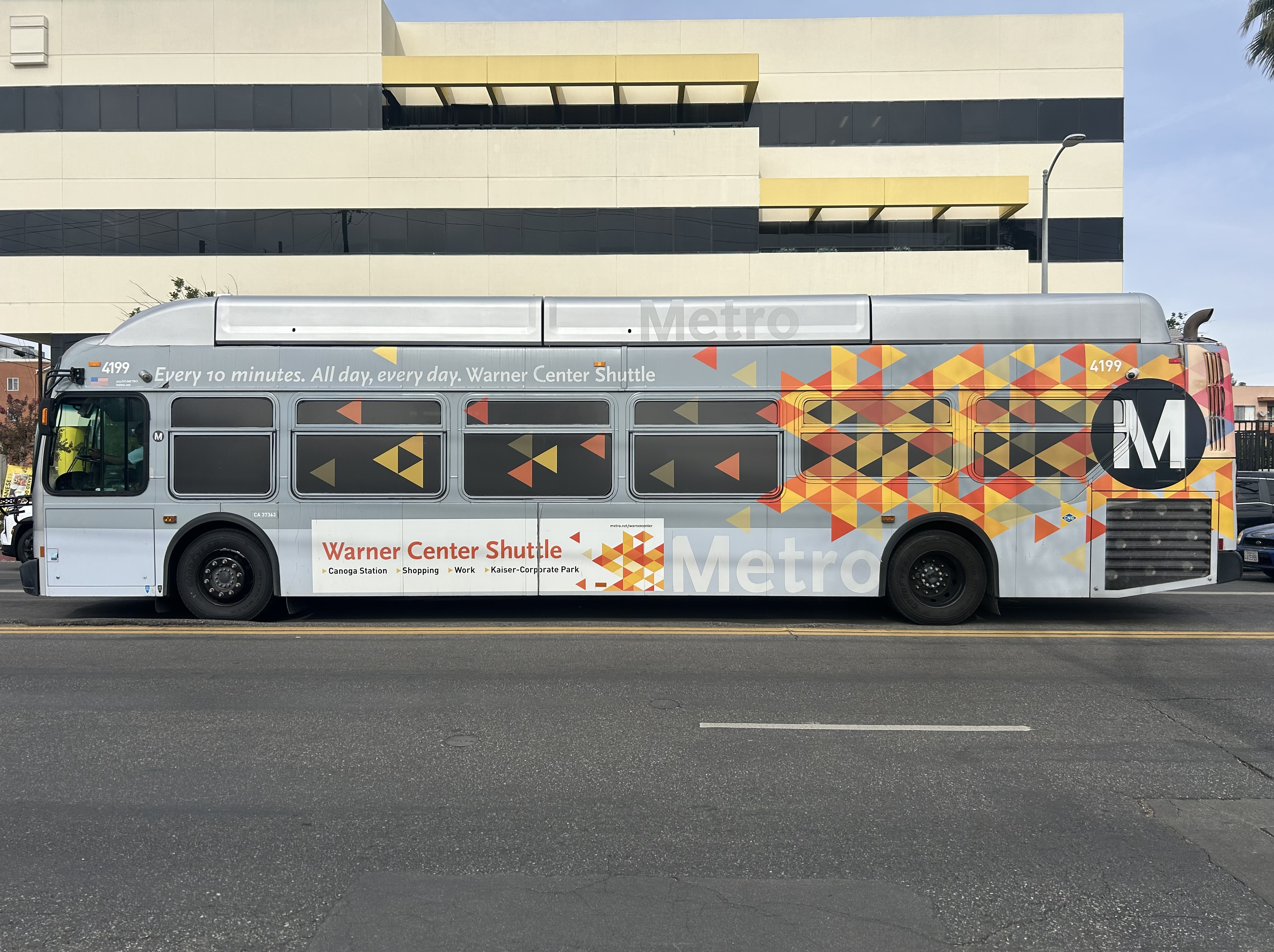
View of the Warner Center shuttle

== Service ==
As of spring 2024, the following routes serve the Warner Center Transit Hub:

- Los Angeles Metro Bus: 601
- LADOT Commuter Express: 422 (stops nearby on West Oxnard Street)
- Topanga Canyon Beach Bus
- VCTC Intercity: Conejo Connection
