= Canoga station =

Rapid-transit bus stop in San Fernando Valley, Los Angeles, California

Canoga
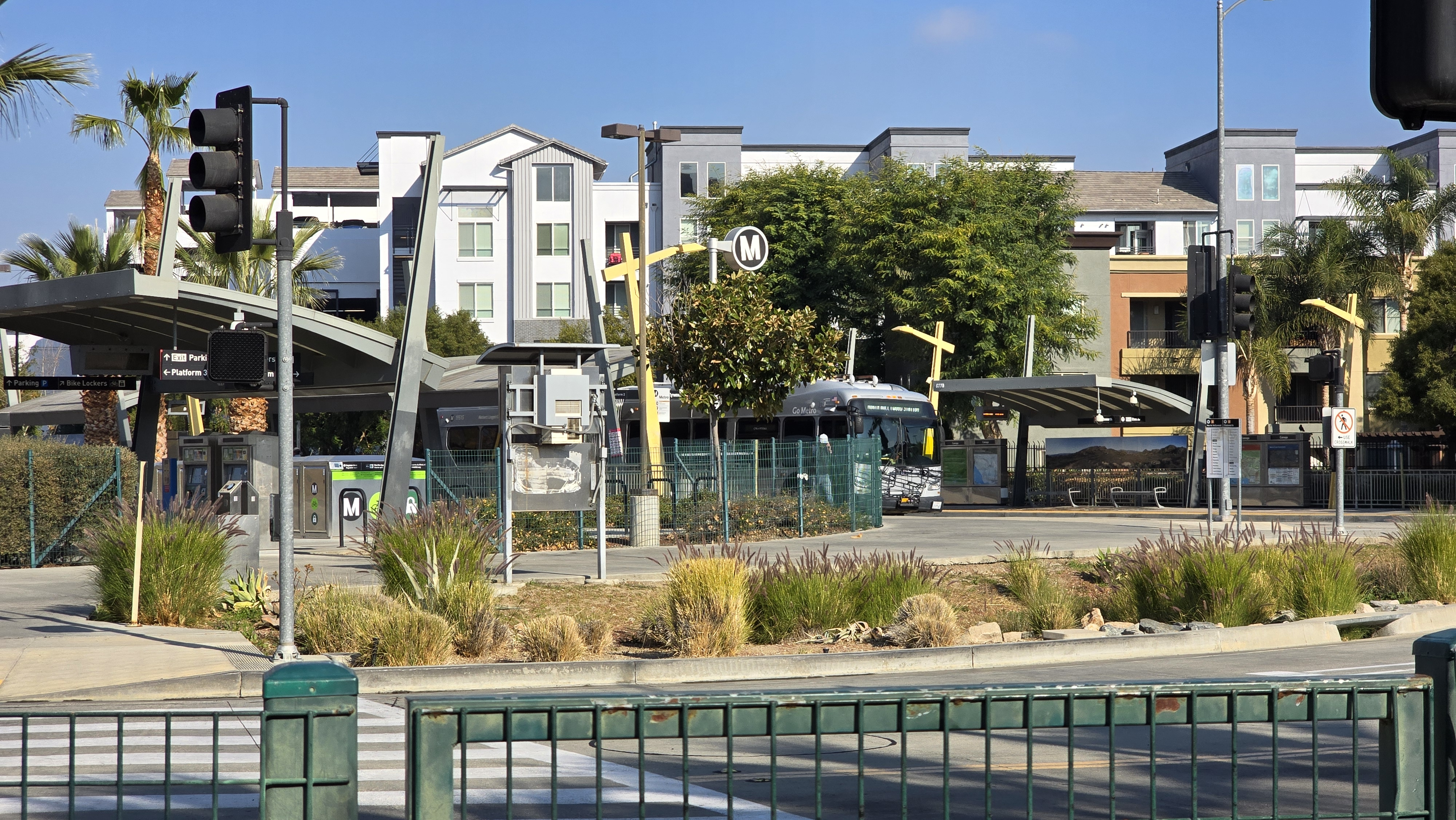
- A G Line bus bound for North Hollywood arrives at Canoga station, 2025

General information
- Location: 6610 Canoga Avenue; Los Angeles, California
- Coordinates: 34°11′26″N 118°35′49″W
- Owner: Los Angeles County Metropolitan Transportation Authority
- Platforms: 4 side platforms
- Connections: Antelope Valley Transit Authority; City of Santa Clarita Transit; Los Angeles Metro Bus

Construction
- Parking: 246 spaces
- Cycle facilities: Racks and lockers
- Accessible: Yes

History
- Opened: December 27, 2006
- Rebuilt: June 30, 2012

Passengers
- FY 2025: 873 (avg. wkdy boardings)

Services
Preceding station	Metro Busway	Following station
Sherman Way toward Chatsworth	G Line	De Soto toward North Hollywood
Former services
Preceding station	Metro Busway	Following station
Sherman Way toward Chatsworth	G Line	De Soto toward North Hollywood
Warner Center Terminus	G Line	De Soto toward North Hollywood
Location

Canoga station is a station on the G Line of the Los Angeles Metro Busway system located on Canoga Avenue in Canoga Park, in the western San Fernando Valley. It is part of the Los Angeles Metro Busway system.

== History ==
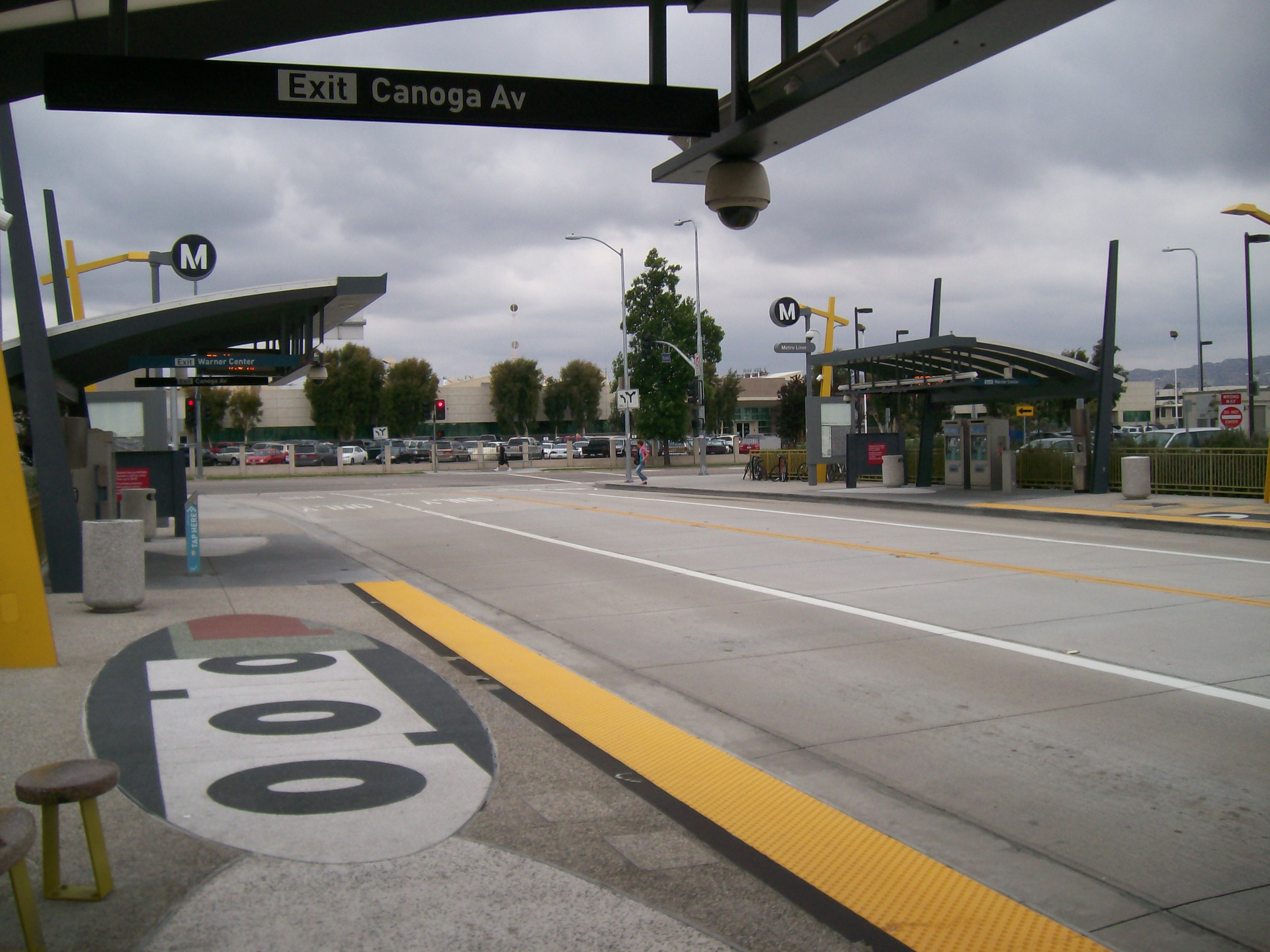
Floor mural public art at 3rd and 4th platforms.

Canoga was built as an infill station and opened on December 27, 2006, about 14 months after the other stations on the line opened eastward. Canoga was built to alleviate the lack of parking available at other G Line stations in the West Valley, providing a total of 612 new parking spaces at the opening, and was also built to be the starting point for the extension northward to Chatsworth.

The 4 miles (6.4 km) Metro Orange Line Chatsworth Extension was completed on June 30, 2012, from Canoga Station north through downtown Canoga Park to the Chatsworth Amtrak/Metrolink Station in Chatsworth. The extension travels north–south along Canoga Avenue. The Canoga station parking lot capacity was reduced to 258 spaces for the Metro Orange Line route's extension north, but a 207-space parking lot was included at the next new stop, Sherman Way station.

The Chatsworth Extension project added two new platforms to the station, for a total of four platforms. The newer platforms serving the Chatsworth extension were northbound platform #1 and eastbound platform #2. The original platforms used by buses serving Warner Center were renumbered as westbound platform #3 and eastbound platform #4. A digital message sign was installed at the entrance to the station which indicated at what time the next Orange Line bus will arrive, its destination, and the platform it will stop at.

With the elimination of the Warner Center station in June 2018, the original platforms are now used by terminating G Line buses and by local buses.

== Service ==
=== Hours and frequency ===
G Line buses run 24 hours a day. Buses operate every eight minutes during peak hours on weekdays. They operate every ten minutes during the daytime on weekdays and most of the day on weekends. Night service on all days is every 20 minutes.

=== Connections ===
As of January 19, 2025, the following connections are available:

- Antelope Valley Transit Authority: 787
- City of Santa Clarita Transit: 796
- Los Angeles Metro Bus: 150, 161, 164, 169, 601

== Nearby destinations ==
- G Line Bikeway
- Westfield Topanga Plaza & Village — 1 block walk west from station, Victory & Owensmouth.
