= Who's Got Trouble? =

Studio album by Shivaree
- Released: January 11, 2005
- Length: 43:20
- Label: Zoë
- Producer: Victor Van Vugt

Shivaree chronology
Rough Dreams (2002)	Who's Got Trouble? (2005)	Tainted Love: Mating Calls and Fight Songs (2007)

Who's Got Trouble? is an album by Shivaree, released by Zoë Records in 2005. It has been called "dark cabaret pop."

== Reception ==
Professional ratings
Review scores
Source	Rating
AllMusic	4/5 stars
Entertainment Weekly	B+
Stylus Magazine	(B+)
PopMatters	(5/10)

CMJ New Music Monthly said that "much of the album tends to give off a background ambience" and that "Shivaree's nouveaux lounge, old-timey cabaret flare trickles with an underlying bizarreness that smacks of one of those hypnotic late-night excursions so common in David Lynch films."

Billboard said that "while the musicianship of the group is indisputable, Parsley's unusual childish voice is stunted by pedestrian songwriting."

Torontoist called the album "fascinating and almost unsettling in its uniqueness."

Stylus argued that although "they may have shrunk their range and scope slightly, the songwriting and execution is as strong as ever."

J. Poet of the Phoenix New Times wrote that "despite the low volume, this album delivers an emotional knockout punch."

== Track listing ==
No.	Title	Writer(s)	Length
1.	"New Casablanca"	Ambrosia Parsley, Danny McGough	3:07
2.	"I Close My Eyes"	Parsley, Duke McVinnie	3:55
3.	"Someday"	Dave Bartholomew, Pearl King	2:11
4.	"Lost in a Dream"	Parsley	4:37
5.	"Little Black Mess"	Parsley, McVinnie	4:32
6.	"Mexican Boyfriend"	Parsley, McVinnie	3:40
7.	"The Fat Lady of Limbourg"	Brian Eno	4:13
8.	"2 Far"	Parsley, Chris Maxwell, Phil Hernandez	2:55
9.	"Baby Girls"	Parsley, McVinnie	5:20
10.	"It Got All Black"	Parsley, McGough, McVinnie, Maxwell, Hernandez	4:02
11.	"I Will Go Quietly"	Parsley, McVinnie	4:48

== Personnel ==
- Ambrosia Parsley – vocals
- Duke McVinnie – guitar
- Danny McGough – keyboards

== Chart performance ==
Country	Position
France	108
