= Shivaree (band) =

American alternative country band

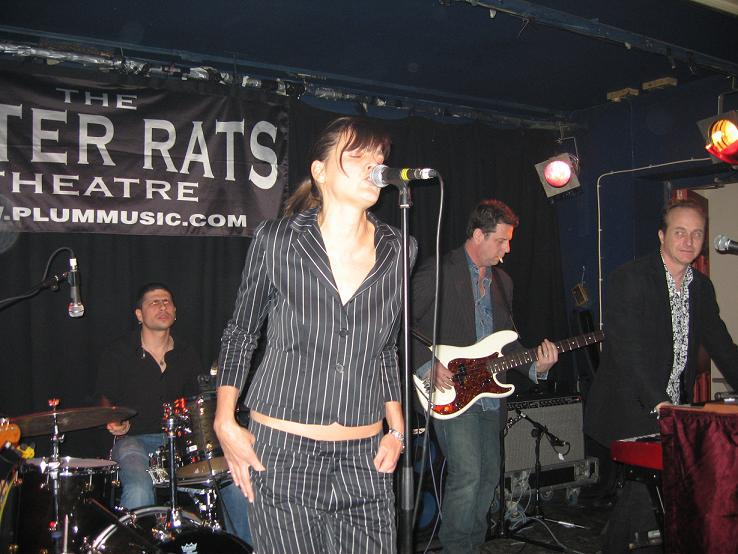
- Shivaree performing live in London on 21st April 2005

Background information
- Genres: Americana, alternative country
- Years active: 1997–2007
- Labels: Capitol, Zoë
- Members: Ambrosia Parsley; Danny McGough; Duke McVinnie

Shivaree was an Americana and alternative country band from the United States founded in 1997, consisting of Ambrosia Parsley (vocals), Danny McGough (keyboard), and Duke McVinnie (guitar). Shivaree is best known for the song "Goodnight Moon", released in 1999, which is featured in the TV series Dawson's Creek, and in films such as Kill Bill: Volume 2, and Silver Linings Playbook. Shivaree officially disbanded in 2007, after a very brief promotional tour of their fourth album, Tainted Love: Mating Calls and Fight Songs, a cover album.

== History ==
The band was formed in 1997 and took its name from the Cajun term "shivaree", which means, roughly, a noisy mock serenade for newlyweds. It is most commonly used along and to the west of the Mississippi River. The group credits many other musicians in its work and is usually joined by two or three collaborators when performing live. It has mentioned its use of primarily Southern American ideas and themes, citing William Faulkner as an influence.

Shivaree's best known song, "Goodnight Moon", was released in 1999, and is featured in seasons 3 and 6 of the television series Dawson's Creek, in the 2012 American film Silver Linings Playbook, in the closing credits of the Quentin Tarantino 2004 film Kill Bill: Volume 2, in the closing scenes and end credits of the French comedy-drama film Ni reprise ni échangée (English title: Monique), and in a commercial for the Norwegian clothing shop Cubus. Additionally, their song, "Little Black Mess", is featured in the Weeds episode "Only Judy Can Judge".

Their second album, Rough Dreams, intended to be issued in 2002, was not released in North America due to contract disagreements with their record label, and for that reason the group then appeared about to split up; however, another EP and another two albums followed. The group disbanded in 2007, after a ten-years musical career where they produced four full-length albums, some of which included unreleased songs, two EPs, and eight singles. The band had approximately 500,000 sales in total.

== Band members ==
Shivaree's band members were vocalist Ambrosia Parsley, keyboardist Danny McGough, and guitarist Duke McVinnie. Parsley was to have released a solo debut album in the spring of 2011. McGough and McVinnie continue to work independently with other artists as session musicians and producers.

== Discography ==
=== Albums ===
- I Oughtta Give You a Shot in the Head for Making Me Live in This Dump (October 19, 1999)
- Rough Dreams (June 17, 2002) – not released in USA due to disagreements with the record label.
- Who's Got Trouble? (January 11, 2005)
- Tainted Love: Mating Calls and Fight Songs (July 31, 2007) – album of covers

=== EPs ===
- Corrupt and Immoral Transmissions (EP – 2000)
- Breach (EP – 2004)

=== Singles ===
- "Goodnight Moon" (1999 & 2000) MV
- "Bossa Nova" (2001) MV
- "John 2/14" (2002) MV
- "After The Prince And The Showgirl" (2002)
- "Rough Dreams (promo)" (2002) French two-track bonus promo CD with "Goodnight Moon (Live au Théatre des Variétés)" and "Great Balls of Fire"
- "I Close My Eyes" (2005) MV
- "New Casablanca" (2005) MV – radio promo CDR only, no official single release.
- "2 Far" (2005) – remake of "Gone too Far" from their previous album "Rough Dreams".
- "Cold Blooded" (2007)

MV indicates that a music video was made for the song as part of promotion.

=== Non-album studio recordings and alternate versions ===
- "Scrub" and "My Boy Lollipop" – were released on the "Goodnight Moon" Maxi single in 1999 and then again on the Corrupt and Immoral Transmissions EP in 2000.
- "Funeral Song for a Dog" – was released only once on the "Bossa Nova" maxi single in 2001.
- "You Don't Know What Love Is" – was recorded during Shivaree's debut album but never released. A 55-second clip was available in an EPK posted in October 2010 on Ambrosia's official Facebook page.
- "The Snake" – was released only once on the "John 2/14" maxi single in 2002.
- "Great Balls of Fire" – was released in 2002 as track two of a rare French "Rough Dreams" promo CD.
- "Bossa Nova (Allskate Mix)" – was released only once, on the "Bossa Nova" single in 2001 and was the mix used in the music video instead of the album version.
- "Bossa Nova (Album Edit)" – was released on the "Bossa Nova" single in 2001. It's similar to the version on I Oughtta Give You a Shot in the Head..., but with an alternate ending. Although titled "(Album Edit)," it's not the same track.
- "I Close My Eyes (Breach Edit)" – was released on the Breach EP in 2004 and on the one-track single of the same title. Almost identical to the album version, but with a slight difference in instrumentation and with an extended ending.
- "I Close My Eyes (Radio Mix)" and "(TV Track)" – were never officially released. These mixes only appear on a very rare two-track radio promo single.

=== Official live released tracks ===
- "Goodnight Moon" (Live) – was released only once in the "Corrupt and Immoral Transmissions" EP in 2000.
- "I Don't Care" (Live) – was released in the "Corrupt and Immoral Transmissions" EP in 2000 and then again in the "Bossa Nova" single in 2001.

=== Live covers and live unreleased songs ===
- "Stroll" (Live) – was NEVER released on CD. It is only a live performance at Le Ciel in Grenoble, France on April 25, 2005. This song was released by Ambrosia Parsley in her 2013 solo album "Weeping Cherry" but was titled "Skin and Bones".
- Great Balls of Fire (Live) – was an unofficial promo release of "The Black Sessions 2002" (The Black Sessions are performances of the live music broadcast on the French Radio station ‘France Inter‘. These are recorded in front of a live audience and featured on a C‘est Lenoir show. A French Radio DJ's name is Bernard Lenoir [“Lenoir“ means “black“ in English]). This was released in a CD of only 2500 copies to local radio stations and shops in North America and Europe. Only 2,500 copies were made of this CD.
- "Tonight You Belong To Me" (Live) – was an unofficial promo release of "The Black Sessions 2002". This was released in a CD of only 2500 copies to local radio stations and shops in North America and Europe.
- "Get Out And Get Under The Moon" (Live) – was NEVER released on CD. It is only a live performance at Le Ciel in Grenoble, France on April 25, 2005.
- "Heaven" (Live) – Duo with Nada Surf for the emission on "Musicplanet2nite"

in Arte on 03.10.2002 but was NEVER released on CD.

- "Dedicated Follower Of Fashion" (Live) – a cover of 'The Kinks' performed in OuiFm radio(AcousticSession+Interview in Paris) March 25, 2005. was never released.
- "Hold Me Right" (live) – only performed on tour but never released.
