= Roscoe Boulevard =

Arterial road in Los Angeles's San Fernando Valley

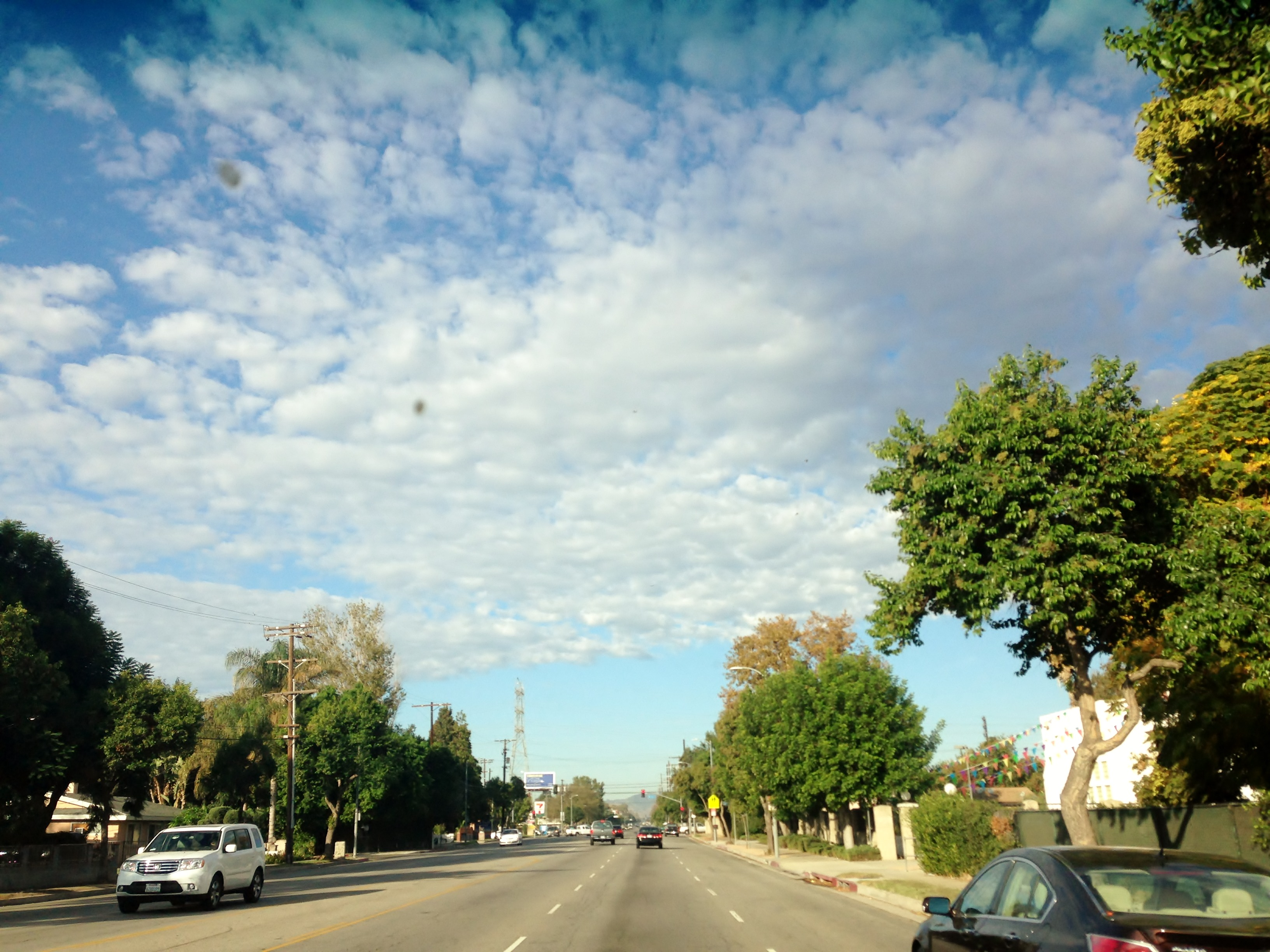
- Roscoe Boulevard in Northridge
- Interactive map of Roscoe Boulevard
- Namesake: a Southern Pacific employee named Roscoe or Roscoe Conkling or something else
- Maintained by: Bureau of Street Services, Los Angeles Department of Water and Power
- Length: 18 mi (29 km)
- Nearest metro station: Roscoe
- West end: Valley Circle Boulevard in West Hills
- Major junctions: SR 27; I-405; SR 170; Gaps in route I-5
- East end: Verdugo Mountains in Sun Valley

Roscoe Boulevard is a major east–west arterial road that runs for 18 miles (29 km) across the San Fernando Valley in Los Angeles, California.

== Name ==
There are two theories as to how Roscoe Boulevard got its name. The first is that it is named after a Southern Pacific employee named Roscoe who regularly asked to get off near his girlfriend's house on the street. The second is that it is named after ex-Senator Roscoe Conkling, who had recently represented Southern Pacific in Santa Clara County v. Southern Pacific Railroad Co. It is also possible that both theories are incorrect.

== Route ==
Roscoe Boulevard travels east–west across almost the entire San Fernando Valley. From west to east, the boulevard travels from West Hills, through Canoga Park, Winnetka, Northridge, Van Nuys, North Hills, Panorama City and into Sun Valley. Slightly west of Lankershim Boulevard, the main segment of the street changes to Tuxford Street, which later changes to La Tuna Canyon Boulevard east of Glenoaks Boulevard and goes up the Verdugo Mountains to meet I-210 in Tujunga.

Roscoe Boulevard has four lanes or more for almost its entire length and is arterial for most of its length, but is residential for three short sections in Sun Valley, these sections separated by a 0.7-mile (1.1 km) gap from the rest of the street and a 0.1-mile (0.16 km) and another less than 0.1 mile gap from each other. The center of these sections, despite being residential, directly connects to I-5, Sunland Boulevard, and Glenoaks Boulevard, while the eastern section connects with Glenoaks Boulevard and also continues into the Verdugo Mountains.

== Transit ==
Metro Local Line 152 runs along Roscoe Boulevard and the G Line's Roscoe station is located at Roscoe and Canoga Avenue in Canoga Park.

The East San Fernando Valley Light Rail Transit Project plans to have a stop at Roscoe and Van Nuys Boulevard in Panorama City.

Roscoe Boulevard is a major contributor to the North San Fernando Valley Transit Corridor. In 2019, Bus Rapid Transit was proposed on the Panorama City/arterial Sun Valley portion of the street, but it was blocked by local residents. 10.4 miles (16.7 km) of peak hour dedicated bus lanes were added to the street instead.

== Notable landmarks ==
Notable landmarks on Roscoe include (from west to east): Roscoe-Valley Circle Park, Orcutt Ranch Horticulture Center, Northridge Hospital Medical Center, Van Nuys Airport, a Budweiser brewery, Panorama City Branch Library, Kaiser Permanente Panorama City Medical Center, Wat Thai of Los Angeles, and Verdugo Mountain Park. Busch Gardens was formerly on Roscoe Boulevard as well.

Schools on Roscoe include (from west to east): Winnetka Avenue Elementary School, Cleveland High School, Valley International Preparatory High School, Noble Avenue Elementary School, Vista Middle School, St. Genevieve High School, The Master's Seminary, Byrd Middle School, and John H. Francis Polytechnic High School.
