= Rough Dreams =

Studio album by Shivaree
- Released: June 17, 2002
- Label: Odeon

Shivaree chronology
I Oughtta Give You... (1999)	Rough Dreams (2002)	Who's Got Trouble? (2005)

Professional ratings
Review scores
Source	Rating
AllMusic	4/5 stars

Rough Dreams is an album by Shivaree, released by Odeon Records in 2002. Due to disputes with the label, Rough Dreams was not officially released in the United States.

== Track listing ==
1. "Wagers"
2. "Gone Too Far"
3. "After The Prince And The Showgirl"
4. "All Because You Told Me So"
5. "Thundercats"
6. "Snake Eyes"
7. "Stealing Home"
8. "John, 2/14"
9. "Reseda Casino"
10. "Ten Minutes"
11. "Queen-Sized Tomb"
12. "Flycatcher"

== Personnel ==
- Ambrosia Parsley – vocals
- Duke McVinnie – guitar
- Danny McGough – keyboards

== Chart performance ==
Country	Position
France	42
