= Ambrosia Parsley =

American musician

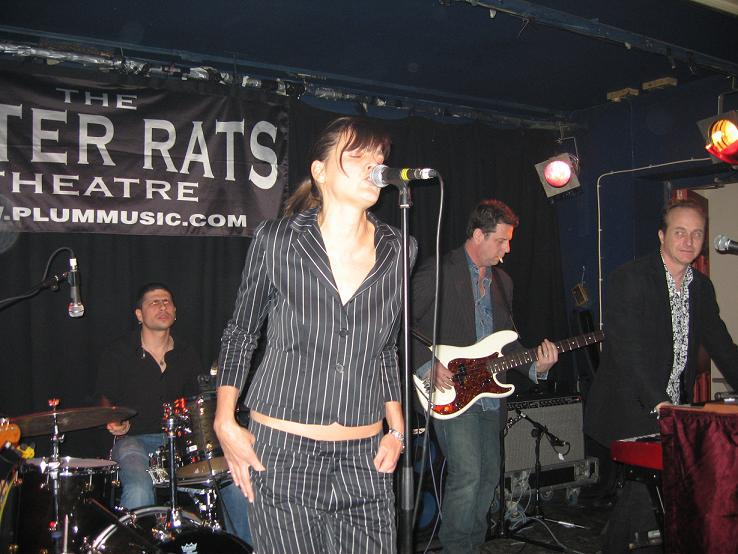
- Shivaree performing live in London on April 21, 2005

Background information
- Born: June 23, 1971 (age 55)
- Genre: Alternative rock
- Occupation: Singer-songwriter
- Years active: 1999–present
- Labels: Capitol, Zoë
- Formerly of: Shivaree

Ambrosia Nicole Parsley (born June 23, 1971, in Reseda, California) is an American alternative pop/rock singer-songwriter. She began her career in 1999 as the lead singer of Shivaree accompanied by Danny McGough (keyboard), and Duke McVinnie (guitar).

== Early life and career ==
Parsley was born June 23, 1971, and grew up in Reseda, California. She was the daughter of general telephone and electronics employee Lyle Parsley and Pam Pollack.

Ambrosia Parsley has released four studio albums and two EPs with Shivaree. In addition to her work with Shivaree, Parsley has appeared on Mocean Worker's album Enter the Mowo and Verbena's La Musica Negra, and has been featured in many other works by other artists.

=== Ambrosia Sings The News ===
In April 2004, Ambrosia Parsley embarked on a project for the liberal radio station Air America called Ambrosia Sings the News, providing a short song, usually under a minute or so, always with the same melody, that attempted to encapsulate the contents of the previous week's headlines. Approximately 47-50 installments of "Ambrosia Sings the News" were aired, some of which she performed live. The show was successful enough that a single entitled "2004 (The Year In Review...For Anyone Who Can Bear the Mere Thought)" was sold exclusively via iTunes.

== Discography ==
=== Albums ===
• Weeping Cherry April 28, 2015, by Barbes Records (US Release)

- Weeping Cherry October 28, 2013, by Fargo Records (EU Release)

• Catskill Christmas November 16, 2016 (US Release), October 27, 2017 (EU Release) by Dangerbird Records

• Dear Carlos April 7, 2023, by Eye Knee Records

=== EPs ===
- I miss you. I do. December 8, 2012
- A Goat House Holiday December 15, 2020

=== Singles ===
- "Rubble" (2010)
- "The Other Side" (2011)
- "Skin & Bone" (2015)
- "It Won't Be Me" (2018)
- "The Kindness of Strangers" (2020)
- "Atlantis" (2021)
- "Let A Wolf" (2021)
- "No Good in the Daytime" (2021)
- "Heavy Metal Stacy" (2021)
- "Beneath the Bird-Feeder" (feat. Carla Rhodes & Holly Miranda) (2021)
- "Over the Overlook" (2022)

== Collaborations ==
Aside from her work with Shivaree, Parsley has collaborated with other artists. Some of these tracks have become available to the public, including:

- "Ether" (back up vocals), from the album "La musica negra" by Verbena, May 20, 2003.
- "I'll take the woods" (lead vocals), from "Enter the Mowo!" by Mocean Worker, April 6, 2004.
- "Everybody Came" (lead vocals), from "For the Kids Too, "various artists, October 19, 2004.
- "Girls: Must be single and very pretty" (lead singer in collaboration with 'The Elegant Too'), from "Help Wanted," released in Esopus Magazine #6, May 1, 2006.
- "Counting" (lead vocals) and "Morning Light" (lead vocals), from "Songs of Sara P. Smith," various artists, tribute to Sara P. Smith, 2006.
- "You'd be surprised" (duet), from "Your Language" by White Hassle, July 25, 2008.
- "Then Was Then and Now Is Now" (lead vocals), from "The Best Is Yet To Come: The Songs Of Cy Coleman (2009)," various artists, September 15, 2009.
- "My World" (lead vocals), a song composed and produced by The Elegant Too for a Juicy Couture fragrance commercial, November 21, 2010.
- "Pink Bricks" (lead vocals) from "Maximum Balloon," the debut album of record producer and musician David Sitek of TV on the Radio.
- "The Blood Is Love" (lead vocals), from "Uncovered Queens of the Stone Age," a Queens of the Stone Age covers album, featuring various female vocalists with musician Olivier Libaux.
