= Reseda Boulevard =

Road in Los Angeles, California, USA

- Interactive map of Reseda Boulevard
- Namesake: Possibly reseda odorata
- Maintained by: Bureau of Street Services, City of Los Angeles
- Length: 12 mi (19 km)
- Location: Tarzana, Reseda, Northridge, Porter Ranch
- Nearest metro station: Reseda station
- South end: Marvin Braude Mulholland Gateway Park
- Major junctions: US 101 in Tarzana; SR 118 in Northridge
- North end: Sesnon Boulevard in Porter Ranch

Reseda Boulevard, named Reseda Avenue until May 1929, is a major north–south arterial road that runs through the western San Fernando Valley region of Los Angeles, California.

== Name ==
Reseda Boulevard was named after the reseda odorata, a yellow-dye plant that grows in hot, dry climates.

== Route ==
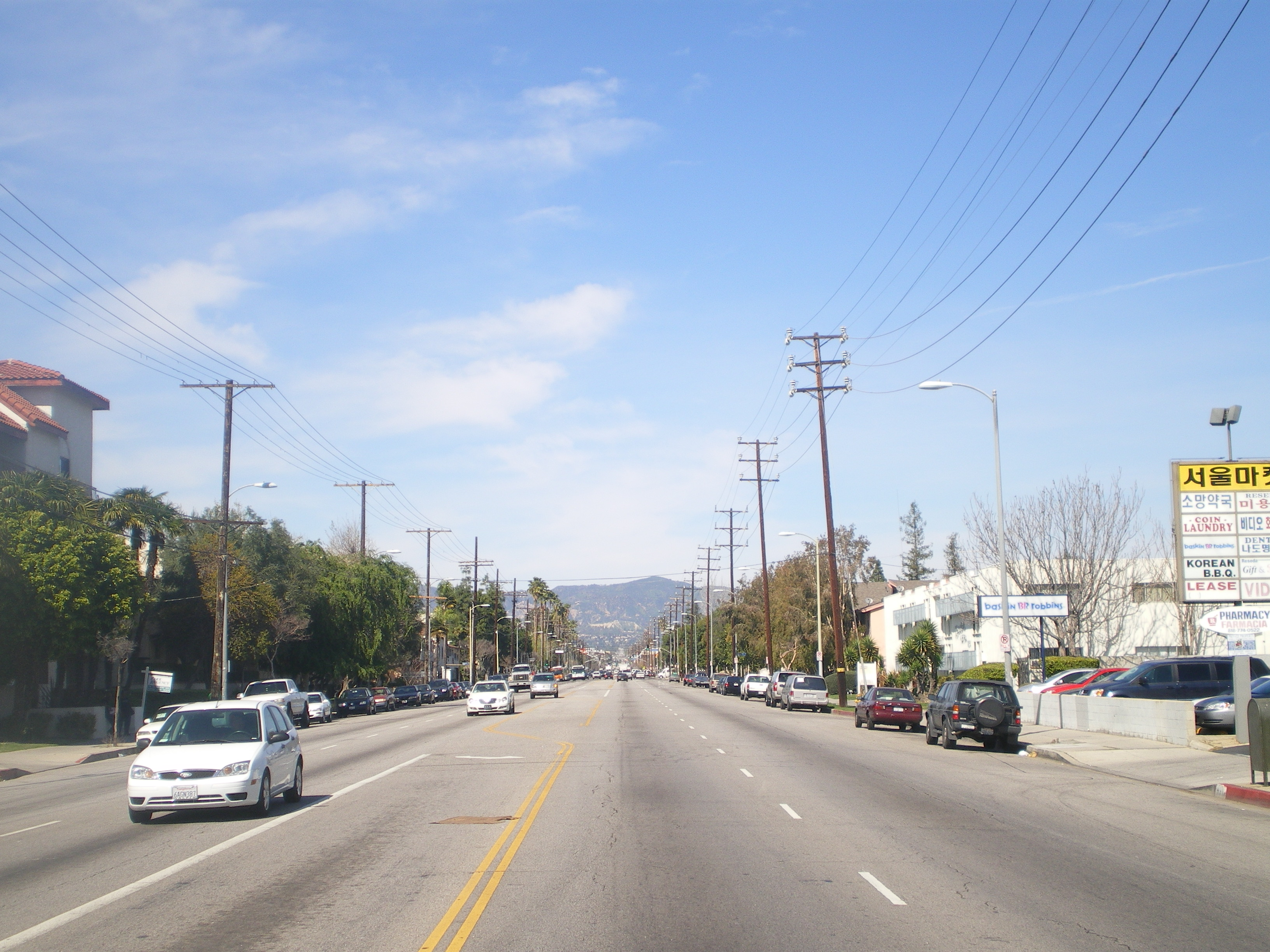
Reseda Boulevard looking north

Reseda Boulevard runs approximately 12 miles (19 km) from the Santa Monica Mountains at the Marvin Braude Mulholland Gateway Park in the south to the Santa Susana Mountains and Porter Ranch in the north. It passes through Tarzana, Mulholland Park gated community, and El Caballero Country Club, then continues into the flats of the Valley through Reseda and Northridge, and ends in at Porter Ridge Park in Porter Ranch.

== Communities ==
Reseda Boulevard from the Santa Monica Mountains.

(Order is from south to north)

- Tarzana – south of Victory Boulevard
- Reseda – between Victory Boulevard and Roscoe Boulevard
- Northridge – between Roscoe Boulevard and the Ronald Reagan Freeway (SR 118)
- Porter Ranch – north of SR 118

== Transit ==
Metro Local line 240 runs along Reseda Boulevard. Reseda also crosses the G Line at its station located at its intersection with Oxnard Street.

Reseda Boulevard is a targeted Vision Zero corridor and is included in Mayor Eric Garcetti's Great Streets Initiative which calls for protected bicycle lanes, bus boarding islands, hybrid protected left turn signals and improved bus shelters. Reseda Boulevard now has the longest stretch of protected bike lanes in Southern California.

In 1977 the Los Angeles City Council failed to approve a plan to create a "Reseda to the Sea" link from the San Fernando Valley to L.A.'s Westside at Sunset Boulevard. Although no alternative plans were evaluated, the city continued to maintain an easement of the proposed alignment until at least 1991. This, along with an ongoing requirement that developers continue to dedicate and extend Reseda as far south as Mulholland Drive to improve fire safety, sparked criticism and protests by environmental and community activists. As of 2019, Reseda Boulevard has not been extended to Mulholland Drive.

== Landmarks ==
(The landmarks are ordered south to north)

- Marvin Braude Mulholland Gateway Park – a 1,500-acre (610 ha) preserve of wild land located in the Santa Monica Mountains at the southern terminus of Reseda Boulevard in Tarzana. The park is named for Los Angeles City Councilman Marvin Braude, who for more than 30 years led the effort to preserve the Santa Monica Mountains. Up the hill a short distance is "dirt Mulholland", the unfinished dirt part of Mulholland Drive from west of the 405 freeway to Canoga Avenue in Woodland Hills, left unfinished to prevent development and encourage hiking and biking.

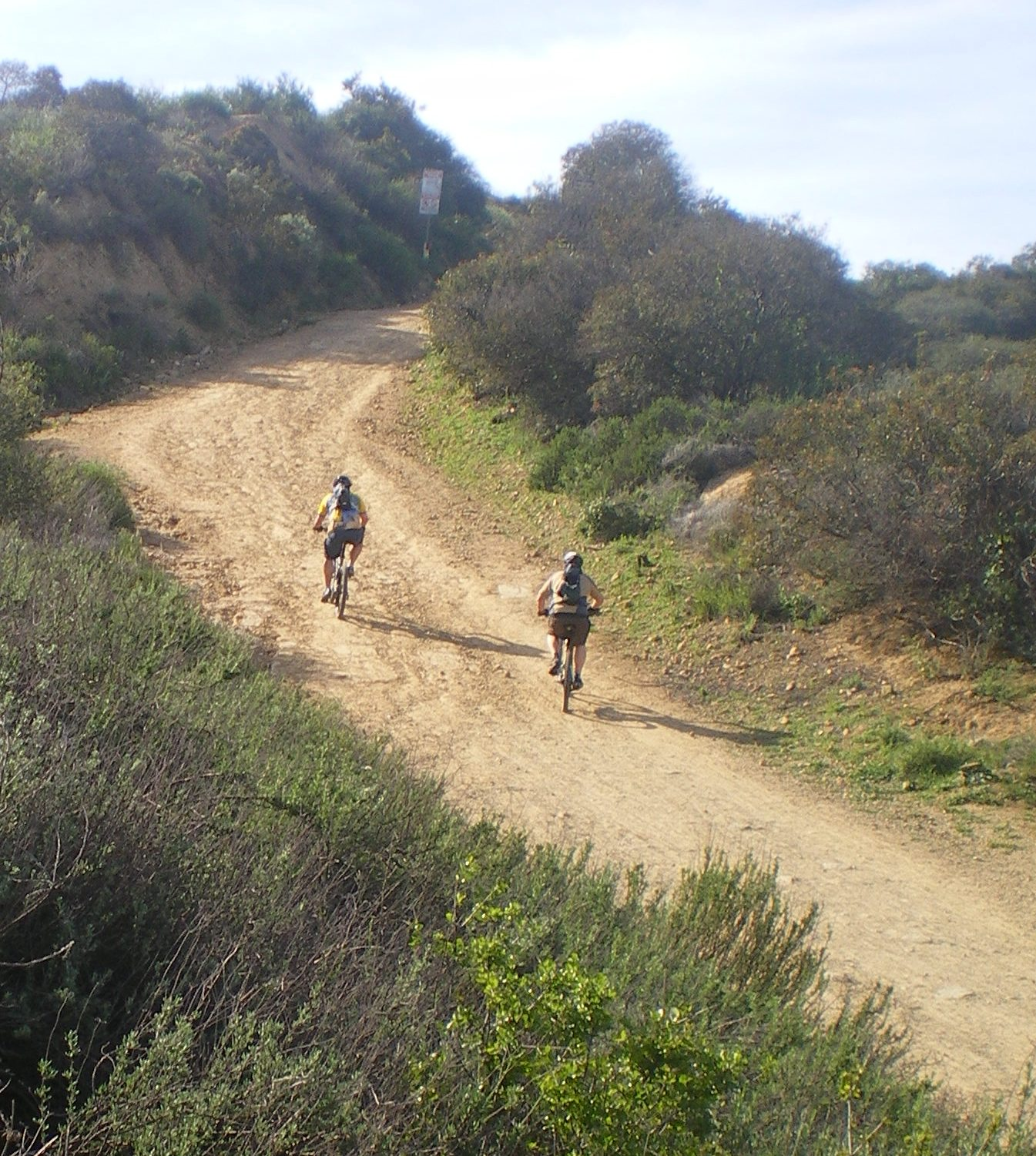
Mountain Bikers at southern terminus of Reseda Drive

- Mulholland Park Gated Community – located at the southern end of Reseda Boulevard, just below Marvin Braude Mulholland Gate, Mulholland Park is a gated communities and is the home to many celebrities.
- Braemar Country Club – country club located in the Santa Monica Mountains overlooking the San Fernando Valley; facilities include two 18-hole golf courses, 20 tennis courts, swimming, yoga, and dining.
- El Caballero Country Club – country club located in the hills of Tarzana; facilities include an 18-hole golf course that hosted the City of Hope Office Depot LPGA Championship from 2001–2003, and has been the choice for the U.S.G.A. sectional qualifying rounds for many years.
- Tarzan Ranch – In 1919, Edgar Rice Burroughs moved to California, where he purchased the 550-acre (220 ha) estate of General Harrison Gray Otis (founder of the Los Angeles Times), renaming it "Tarzan Ranch". Reseda Boulevard in Tarzana runs through the former Tarzan Ranch. In 1923, Burroughs sold a large portion of his ranch for home sites. In 1930, the new community was named Tarzana.

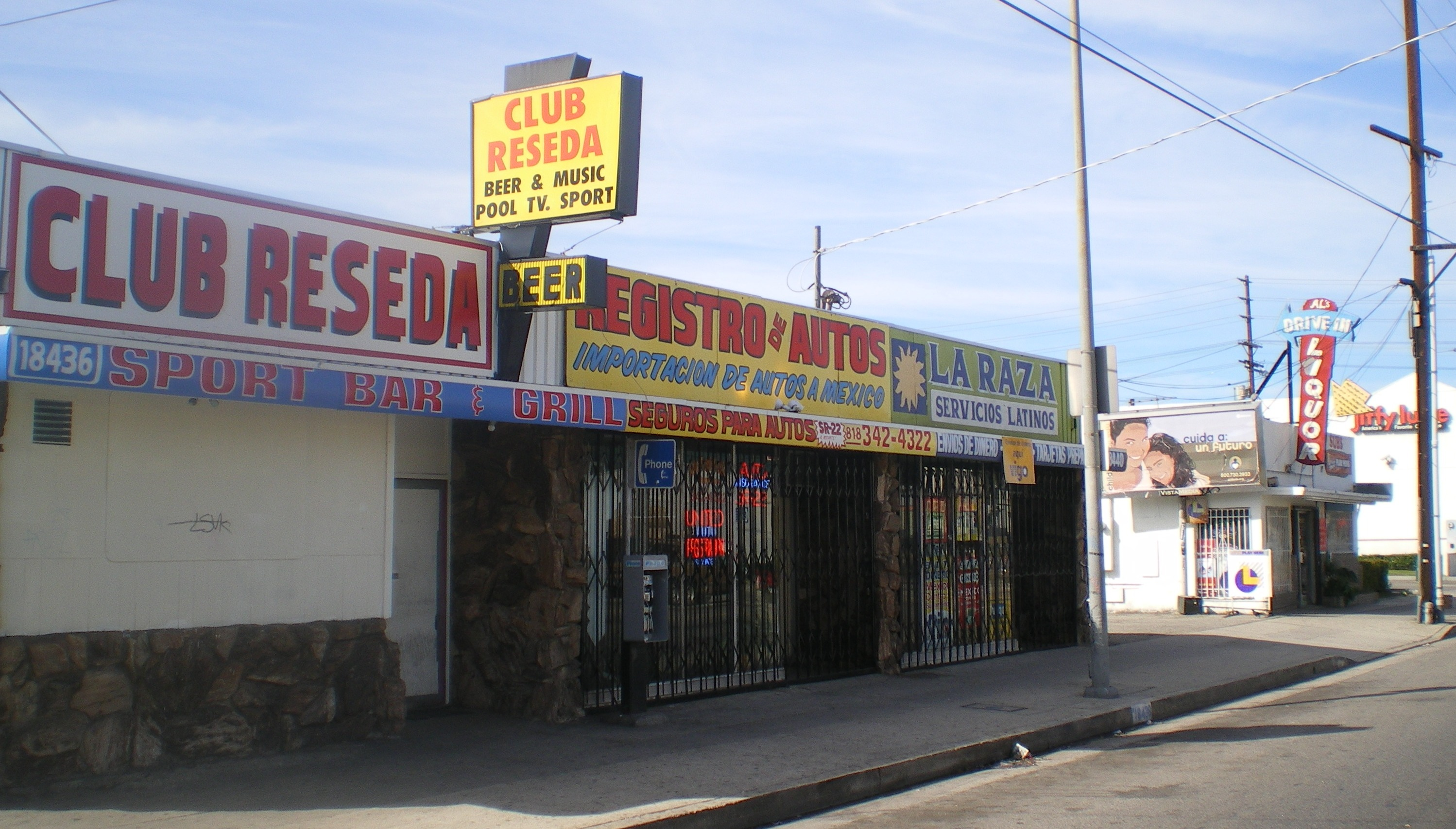
Shops at Saticoy and Reseda

- Reseda Park and Recreation Center – park and recreation center located at 18411 Victory Boiulevard, including barbecue pits, baseball diamond, basketball courts, children's play area, community room, picnic tables, seasonal pool, tennis courts and volleyball courts.
- Northridge Meadows Apartments (9565 Reseda Boulevard) – former site of a three-story, 120-unit apartment complex that collapsed in the 1994 Northridge earthquake; sixteen fatalities resulted from the collapse of the building.
- Northridge Hospital Medical Center – a 411-bed hospital founded in 1955 and located one block east of Reseda Boulevard on Roscoe, is one of two certified Level II trauma centers in the San Fernando Valley. Though located very near the epicenter of the 1994 Northridge earthquake and was damaged, it remained open and over 1,000 patients were treated in 48 hours following the earthquake.

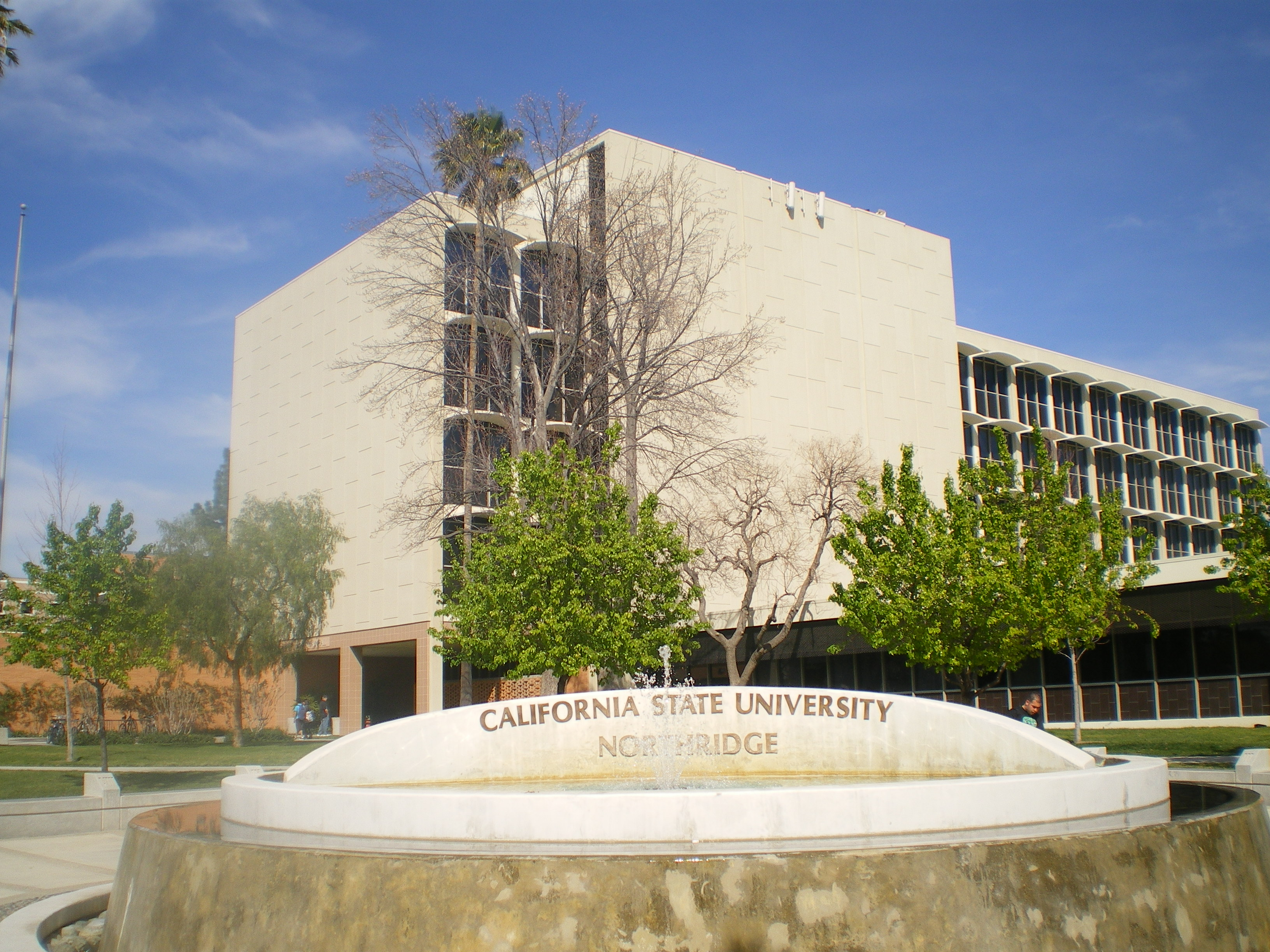
California State University Northridge

- California State University, Northridge – located to the east of Reseda Boulevard between Nordhoff Street and Halsted Street, Cal State Northridge was founded in 1954 and is a four-year university in the Cal State system with 34,000 students, over 4,000 faculty and staff, sited on a 356-hectare (3.56 km^{2}) campus in the San Fernando Valley.
- Faith Bible Church – Originally known as the Norwegian Lutheran Church, Faith Bible Church, located at 18531 Gresham Street, Northridge, was built in 1917 in the Gothic style. It was declared a historic site in 1976.
- Northridge Park and Recreation Center – a Los Angeles city park and recreation complex including a licensed child care facility, preschool building, historic Cultural Arts House and a community building.
- Oakridge and Grounds – located just west of Reseda Boulevard at 18650 Devonshire Street, Northridge. Built in 1937 and designed by architect Paul R. Williams in the English Manor style for actress, Barbara Stanwyck, Jack Oakie and his wife purchased the home from Stanwyck a short time later. The house has had very few alterations and was designated a historical site in 1990. An entertaining video tour of the Oakridge Estate is available on the Wandrlust web site.
- Porter Ridge Park - a public park located at Reseda Boulevard's northern terminus. It is informally known as ET Park for the famous movie that used it as a shoot location.

== Northridge Earthquake ==
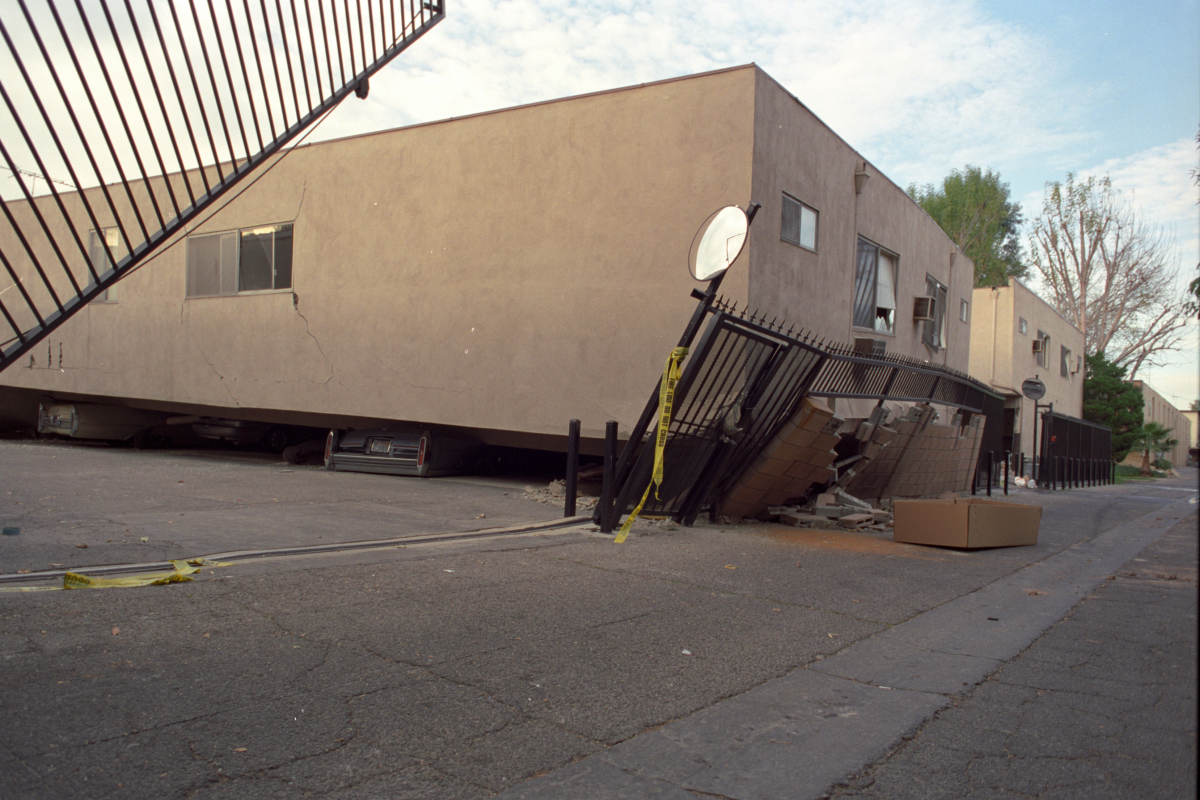
Northridge Meadows Apartments collapsed in Northridge earthquake

The epicenter of the 1994 Northridge earthquake was approximately one block west of Reseda Boulevard in the community of Reseda. Damage occurred throughout the San Fernando Valley, though areas of more widespread destruction followed the boulevard's northern course, including the Northridge Meadows Apartments, where sixteen people died when the top two floors collapsed on the ground-floor.

== Pictures ==
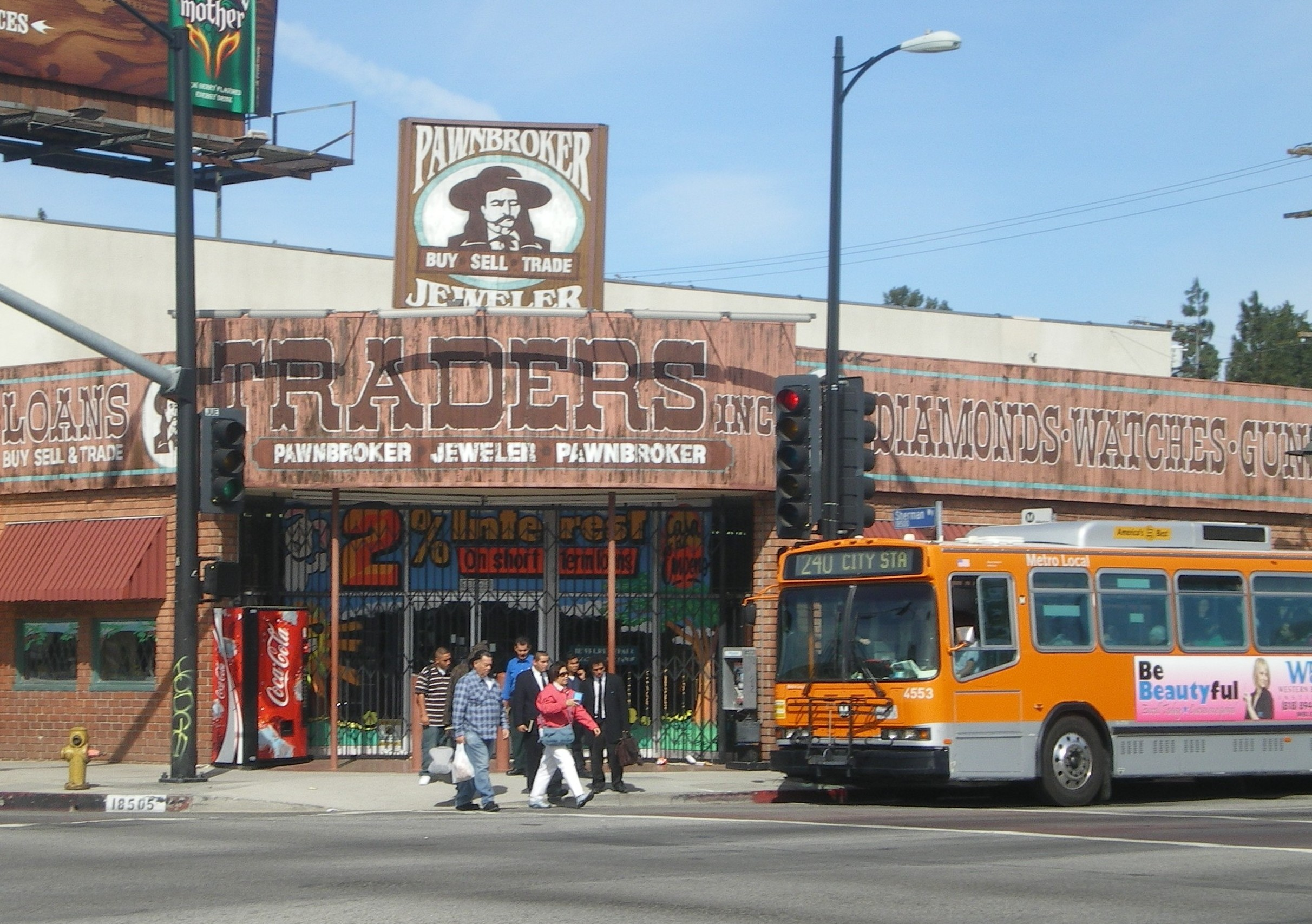
Pawnbroker at Sherman Way and Reseda

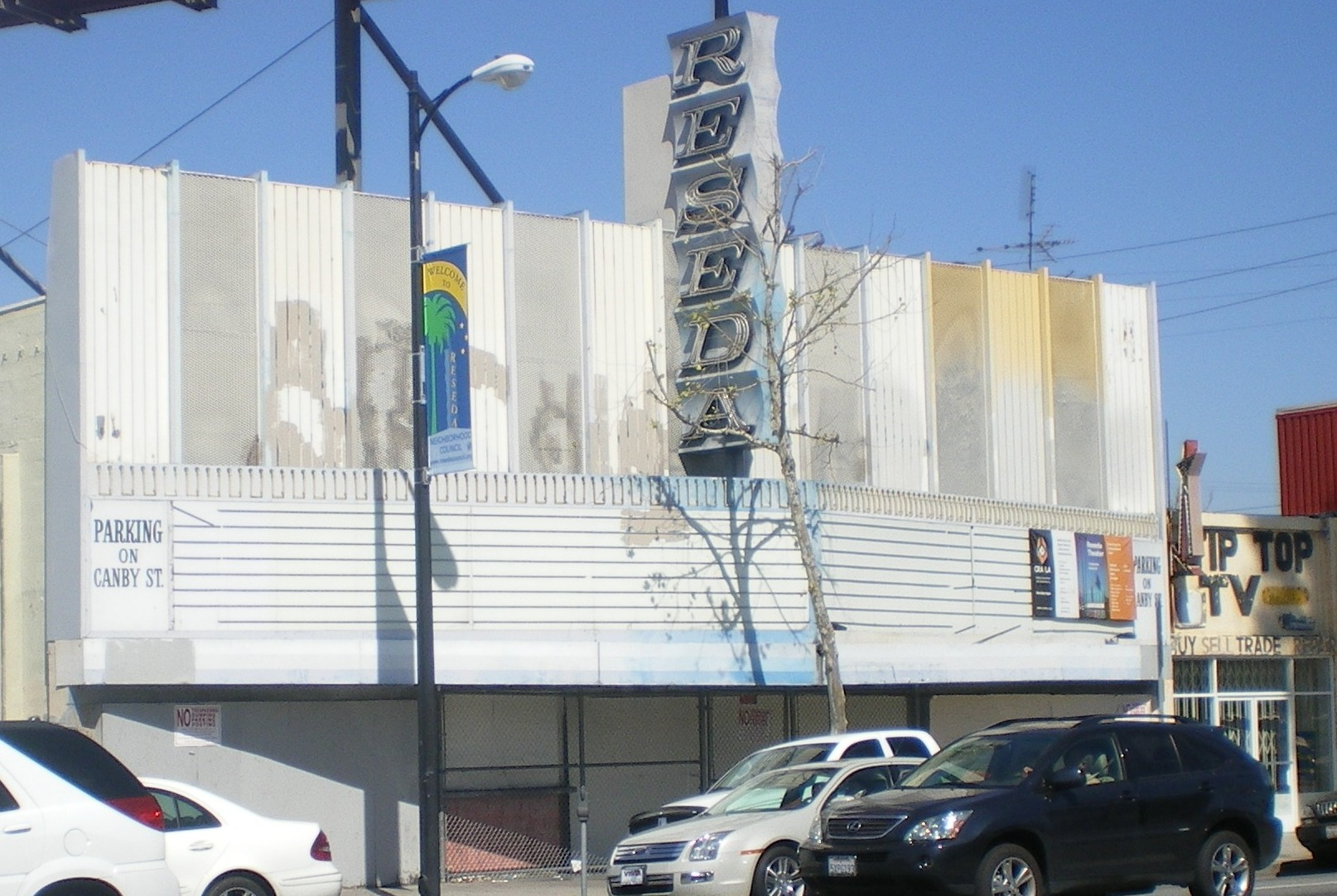
Reseda Theater

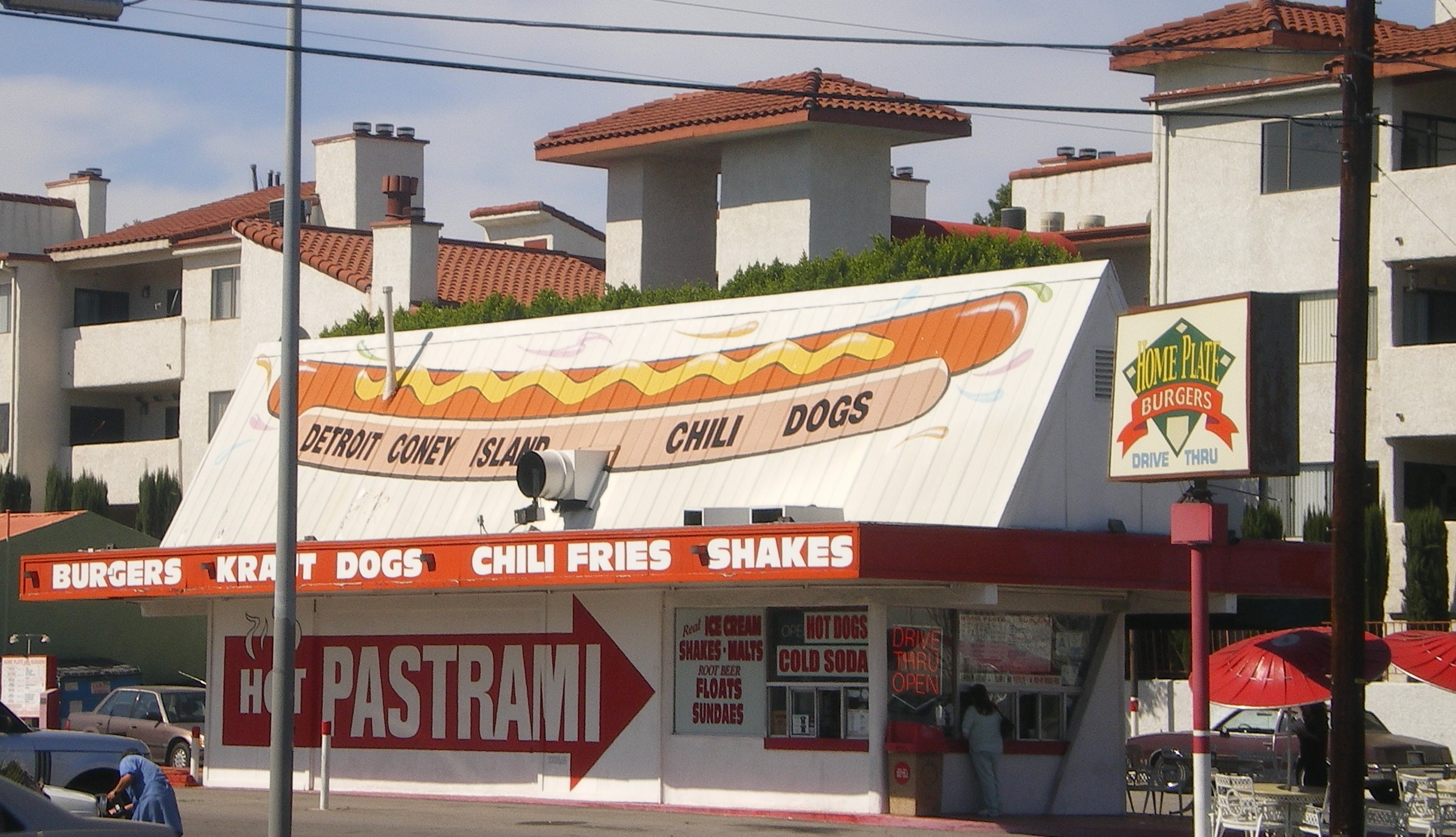
Reseda Hot Dog Stand

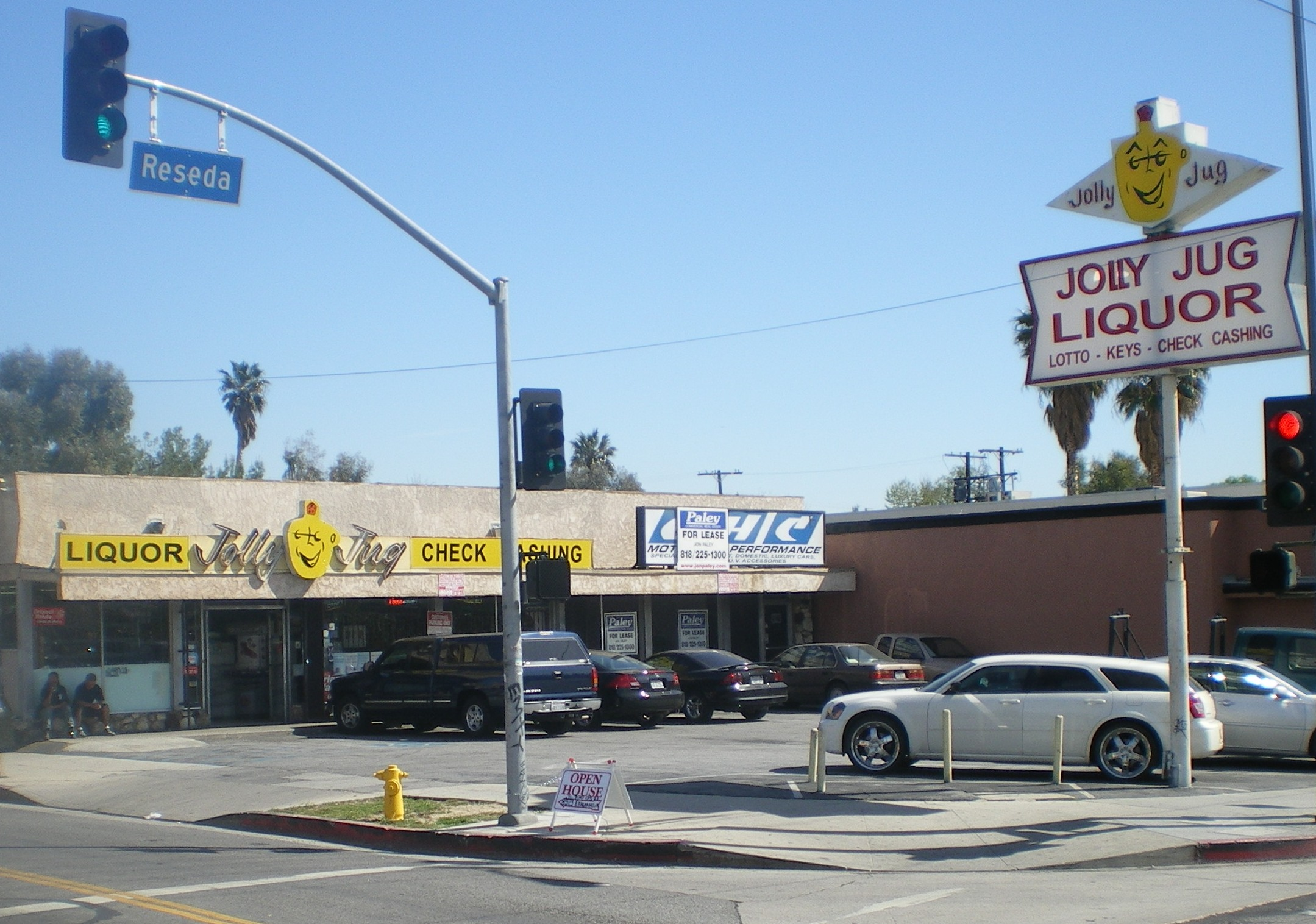
Jolly Jug Liquor

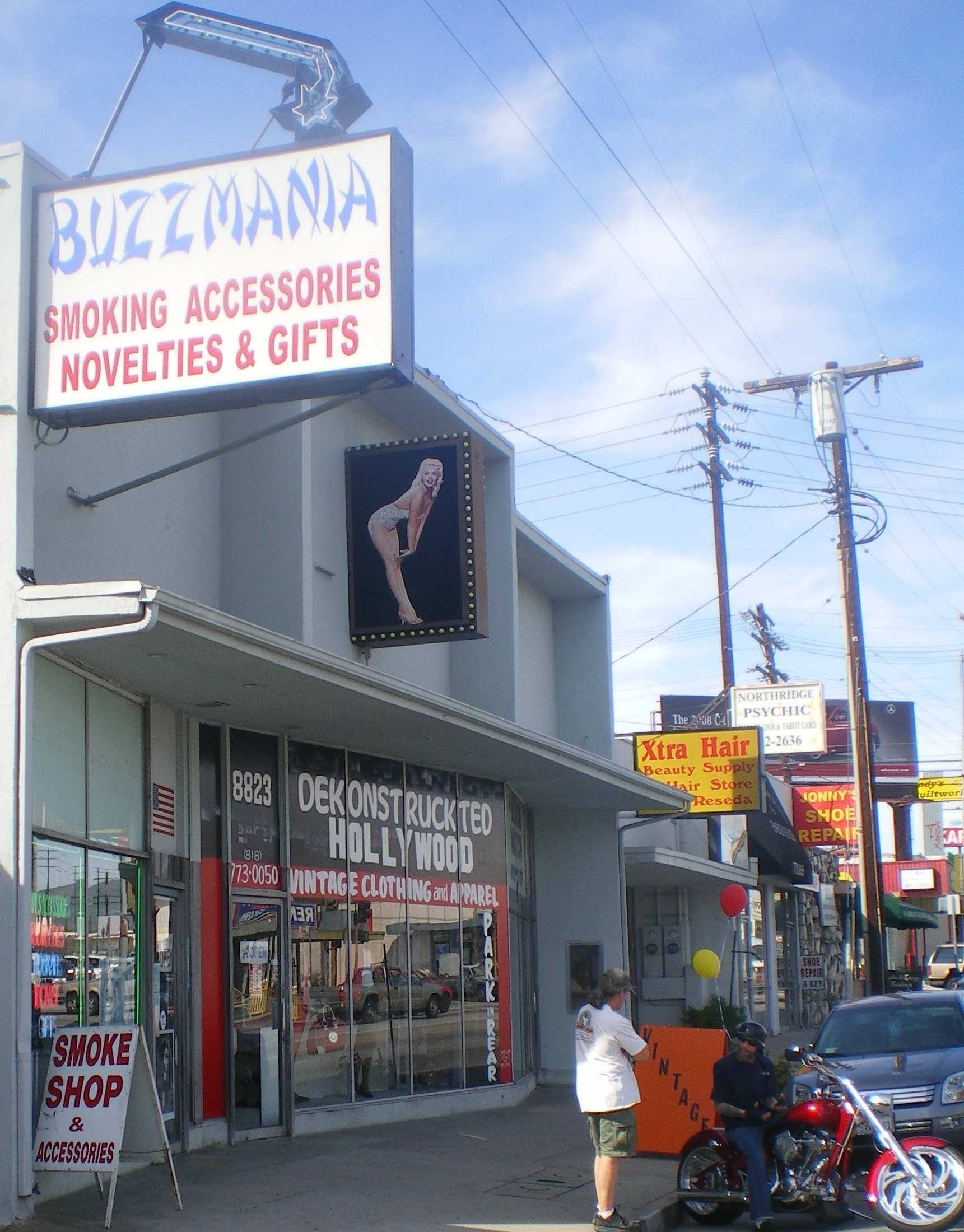
Shopping District at Reseda and Gresham Street
