= Los Angeles Metro Bus =

Bus system in Los Angeles County, California

Metro Bus
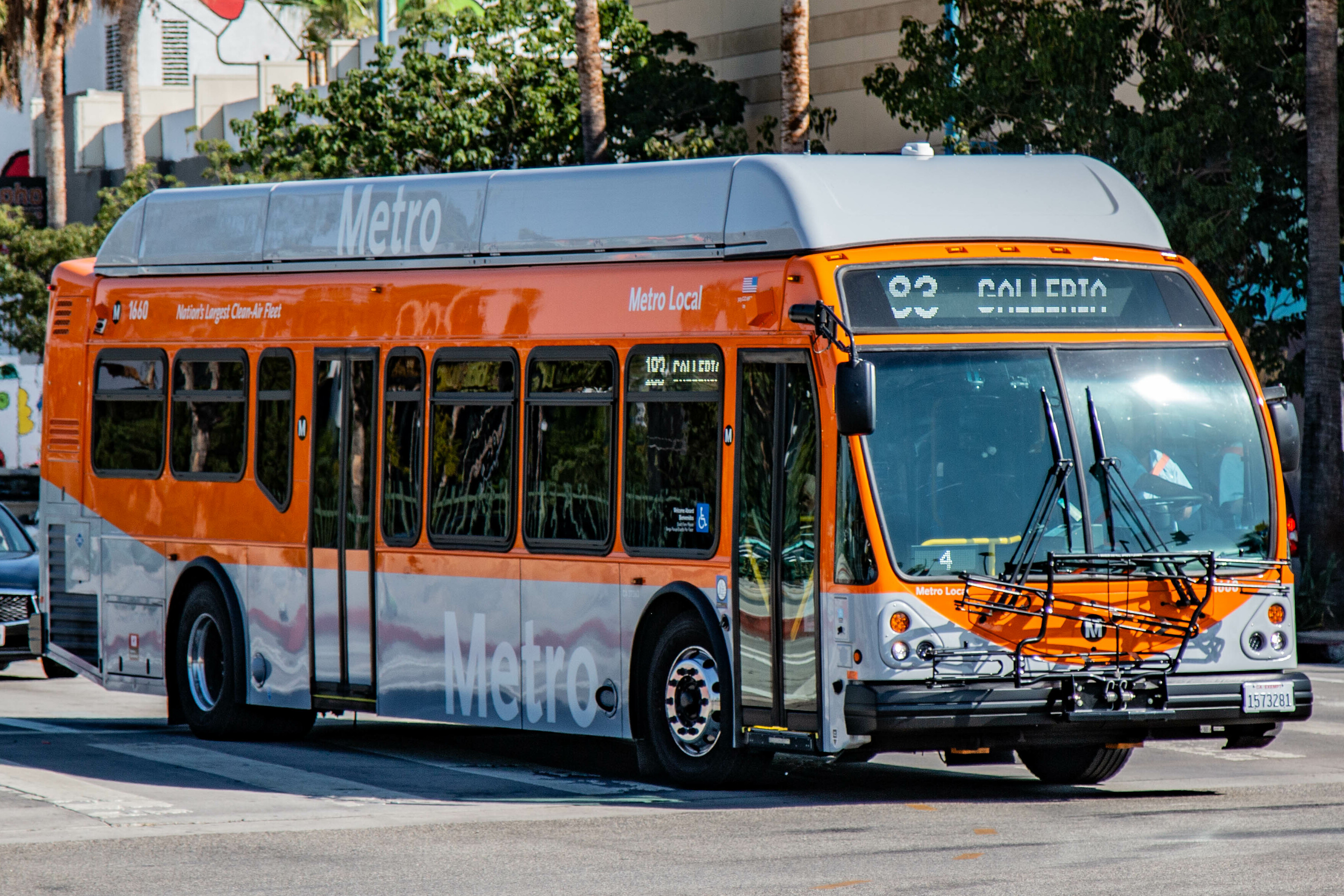
- Metro Bus ENC Axess bus in North Hollywood
- Parent: Los Angeles Metro
- Founded: February 1, 1993; 33 years ago
- Headquarters: Metro Headquarters Building, Downtown Los Angeles
- Service area: Los Angeles County, California
- Service type: Transit bus
- Routes: 115 (excluding Metro Busway)
- Fleet: 2,086 buses
- Daily ridership: 742,800 (weekdays, Q2 2026) (Note: Ridership data also includes Metro Busway (G & J Line) operations)
- Annual ridership: 236,942,000 (2025)
- Fuel type: Compressed natural gas; Battery-electric
- Operator: Los Angeles Metro; MV Transportation; Southland Transit

Metro Bus is the transit bus service in Los Angeles County, California, operated by Los Angeles Metro. Metro Bus operates in the Los Angeles Basin, the San Fernando Valley, and the western San Gabriel Valley, serving a population of approximately 10 million people.

Metro Bus provides the main local bus service in the city of Los Angeles, and regional services across its service area. Metro Bus services connect with multiple other operators in the region, providing connections at an extensive network of transit centers, many of which are located at Metro Rail stations and regional destinations. As of December 2024, there are 115 Local, Rapid, Limited, and Express routes in the system, excluding Metro Busway routes.

The Metro Bus fleet is the third-largest in the United States, with 2,086 buses As of February 2026. The Metro Bus fleet consists of CNG and battery-electric buses, with additional hydrogen fuel-cell and battery-electric buses on order. The majority of Metro Bus lines are operated by Metro directly, with select services operated by private contractors. In 2025, the system had a ridership of 236,942,000, or about 742,800 per weekday as of the second quarter of 2026.

== History ==
=== Early 1990s: Founding of Metro ===
Los Angeles Metro was founded in 1993 from the merger of the Southern California Rapid Transit District and the Los Angeles County Transportation Commission. It was charged with financing and constructing a rapid transit rail system, operating the bus system, and coordinating other transportation programs in the region. The conflicts that had occurred between the RTD and the LACTC persisted as internal conflicts within Metro, with union leaders arguing that former LACTC staff received better benefits than former RTD staff, even after the merger.

The ongoing conflict over funding rail construction and bus services continued at Metro. Only months after the agency's founding, Metro CEO Julian Burke presented a proposed budget for fiscal year 1994 to the agency's board of directors. The proposed budget would halt progress on the Union Station–Pasadena segment of the Blue Line to support continued bus operations and rail construction. Los Angeles mayor Richard Riordan strongly criticized the plan, and at his insistence, the board directed Metro staff to continue planning for the Pasadena Blue Line, causing Metro to look for other sources of funding.

Metro proposed a large bus fare increase in June 1994, to take effect on September 1st of that year. The fare for a single bus ride was proposed to increase 23% from $1.10 to $1.35 ($2.39 to $2.93 in 2025), and all monthly passes were planned to be eliminated. A 2004 analysis found that the average monthly bus pass user took approximately 100 trips per month, which would have caused a fare increase of over 50% for the average passholder.

=== Late 1990s: Consent decree and Metro Rapid ===
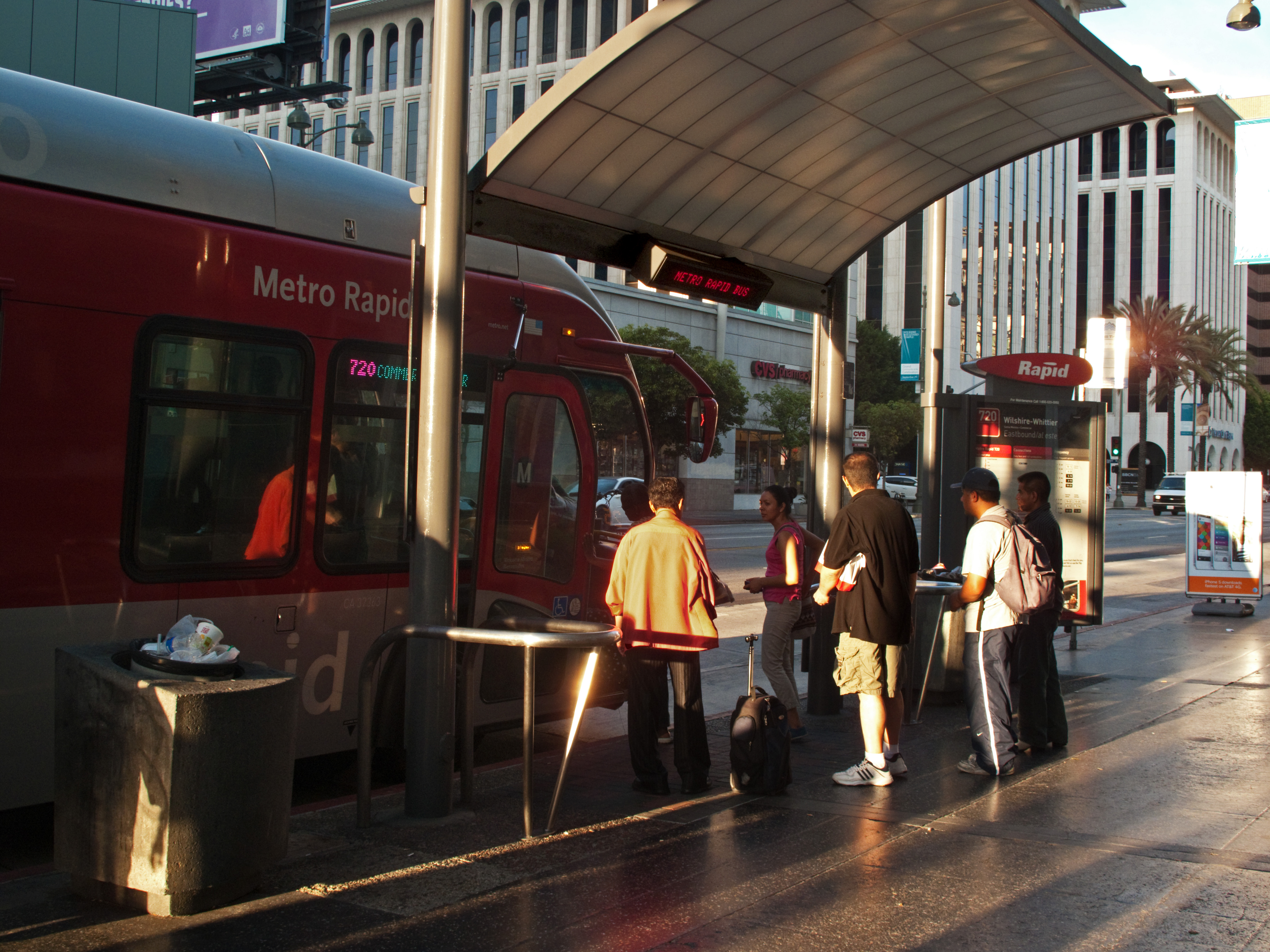
Metro Rapid stop on Wilshire Blvd from the 2000 pilot program, with amenities including a real-time arrivals display

On August 31, 1994, a class action lawsuit was filed against Metro by a coalition of local and national civil rights organizations, representing Los Angeles bus riders. The civil rights organizations, including the Bus Riders Union, the Southern Christian Leadership Conference, and the Korean Immigrant Workers Advocates, supported by the NAACP Legal Defense Fund. The plaintiffs argued that Metro's large subsidies for rail construction and operation discriminated against bus riders, whose demographics were significantly different than those of rail riders. The court delayed the fare increase, and after nearly two years of discovery proceedings, the case was settled before it went to trial.

The consent decree that resulted from the settlement required Metro to significantly expand bus service. One product of the consent decree was Metro Rapid, a brand of limited-stop bus service with some characteristics of bus rapid transit. A delegation from the Los Angeles city government, including Mayor Richard Riordan, visited the Brazilian city of Curitiba in early 1999. The civic leaders were impressed by Curitiba's comprehensive bus rapid transit system, the Rede Integrada de Transporte, and sought to replicate it. By the summer of 1999, planning was underway for a pilot program of bus rapid transit service on two corridors: Wilshire Blvd/Whittier Blvd and Ventura Blvd.

In addition to Metro Rapid service, Metro expanded local and express bus service, purchased hundreds of new buses, and lowered bus pass prices. Metro Rapid service on the two pilot corridors began in June 2000, opening on the same day as the Red Line extension to North Hollywood. Both lines were immediately popular, generating ridership growth of 25% in their first 90 days of operation. Travel time was improved by over 20% on both lines, aided by the signal priority at intersections in the City of Los Angeles. Customer satisfaction increased relative to the previous local and limited-stop bus services, and the Rapid service quickly captured over 60% of bus ridership on both corridors.

=== 2000s: Alternative fuels and declining ridership ===
Metro introduced compressed natural gas-powered buses and low-floor buses in the late 1990s. By 2003, Metro was the largest operator of CNG buses in the country, with over 1,900 CNG buses operating across its service area. A rule passed by the South Coast Air Quality Management District in 2000 banned new diesel-powered buses in transit fleets in Southern California, seeking to improve air quality in the region.

California transit ridership began declining in the early 2000s, with a large share of the decline coming from the Los Angeles region. A 2018 study attributed some of the decline to rising car ownership among passengers, and also highlighted the effect of bus service cuts across the region. From 2007 to 2013, bus service in miles traveled dropped 13% across the entire Southern California Association of Governments region, which extends beyond Los Angeles County. In addition to the 2018 study's hypothesis, a 2024 study argued that some of this decline was due to the high cost of housing in areas of Southern California that had better access to public transport.

Metro introduced the TAP card fare payment system in 2008, creating a single fare card for most buses and trains in Los Angeles County. TAP replaced a system of magnetic stripe stored-value cards already in use by some agencies, including Big Blue Bus and Foothill Transit. In 2018, TAP fully replaced the previous system of paper interagency transfers, offering discounts on rides that connected between multiple bus and rail operators.

=== 2020s: NextGen Bus Plan and COVID-19 ===
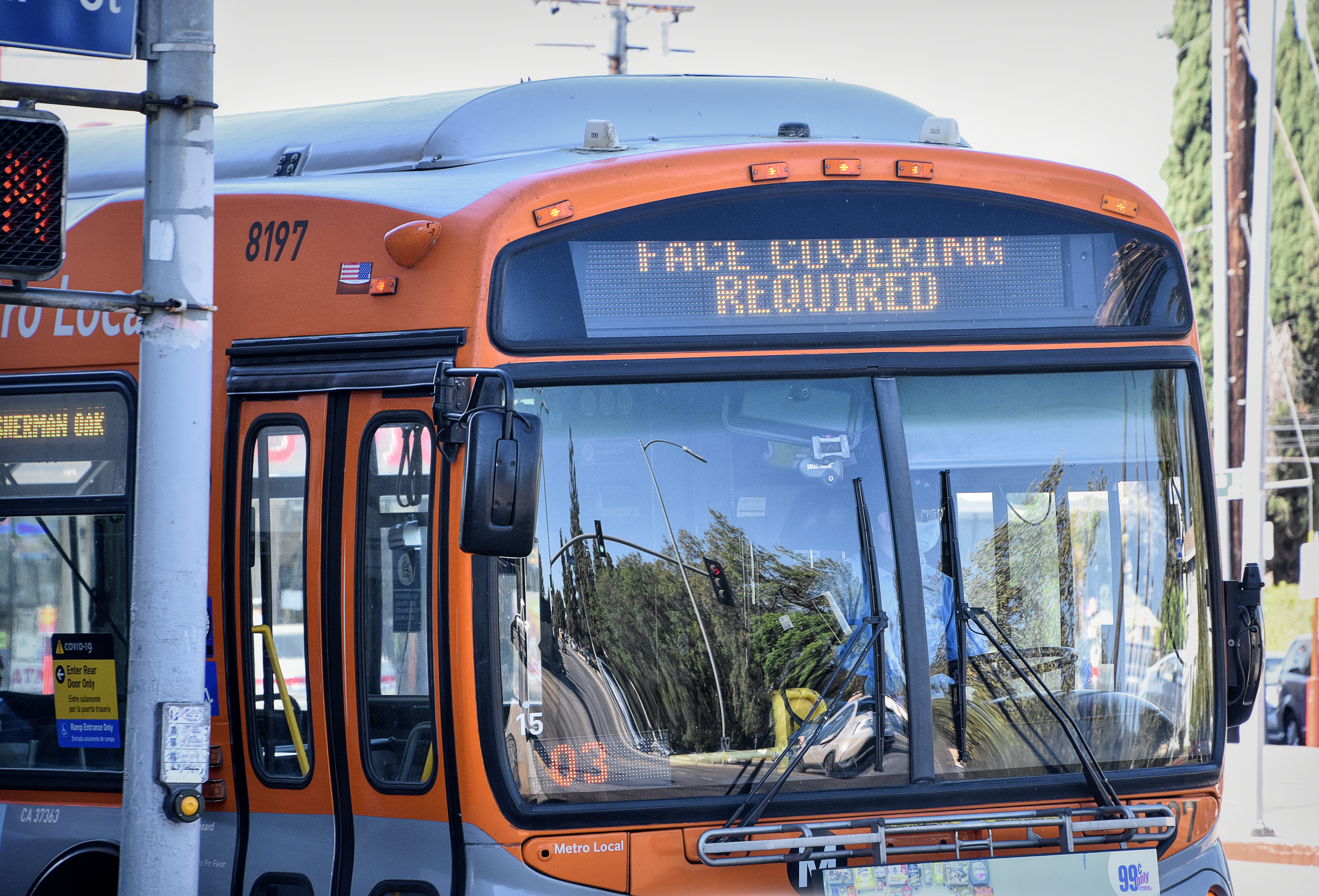
During the early stages of the COVID-19 pandemic, Metro Bus required face masks on buses and required passengers to board through the rear door

The NextGen Bus Plan was introduced to passengers in 2019 and approved by the Metro board in 2021. The plan eliminated most Metro Rapid routes, stating that passengers would be better served with more frequent local service on routes with slightly fewer stops. As part of the plan, low ridership routes were converted to Metro Micro microtransit, routing was simplified, and some stops closer than one quarter mile spacing were eliminated.

At the outset of the COVID-19 pandemic in California, Metro Bus services were cut to approximately 80% of 2019 levels. Face masks were required on Metro buses, and passengers were required to board through the back door of buses to support social distancing between bus drivers and passengers.

The pandemic's impact on public transit affected ridership in Los Angeles and worldwide. In 2021, as transit ridership nationwide began to increase, bus service in Los Angeles regained patronage faster than rail services in the region, and faster than its peers in California. Los Angeles-area transit ridership outpaced Bay Area transit ridership by tens of millions of trips in 2021 for the first time in decades, driven largely by bus ridership. An analysis by the Bay Area News Group showed that the largest bus operators in the Los Angeles region were at 74% of 2019 bus ridership levels in June 2022, far higher than their peers in New York City and the Bay Area.

Full map of the Los Angeles Metro system, with Metro Bus lines shown in orange (local lines) and red (Metro Rapid lines)

== Routes ==
Metro buses are given line numbers that indicate the type of service offered. This method was devised originally by the Southern California Rapid Transit District, Metro's predecessor.

- Line numbers lower than 100 are local routes to/from Downtown Los Angeles, numbered counterclockwise from least to greatest.
- Line numbers in the 100s are local east/west routes in other areas
- Line numbers in the 200s are local north/south routes in other areas
- Line numbers in the 300s are limited-stop routes
- Line numbers in the 400s are freeway express routes to/from Downtown Los Angeles
- Line numbers in the 500s are freeway express routes in other areas
- Line numbers in the 600s are shuttle/circulator routes
- Line numbers in the 700s are limited-stop rapid routes.
- Line numbers in the 800s are used to designate Metro Rail routes as well as supplementary shuttles for suspended rail service.
- Line numbers in the 900s are Metro Busway routes.

=== 1-99 (Local routes to/from Downtown Los Angeles) ===
Local bus service to/from Downtown Los Angeles and other areas. The line numbering begins at line 2 (Sunset Bl, a line leading west from USC) and proceeds counterclockwise around Downtown Los Angeles, ending at line 94 (Magnolia Bl).

Route	Terminals		via	Days of operation	Notes
2	Westwood; UCLA (Le Conte Av & Westwood Bl)	University Park; Expo Park/USC station	Sunset Bl, Alvarado St, Hoover St	24 hours	Owl service interlined with Line 602 (10p-2a); The only non-triple digit route to not serve Downtown LA
4	Santa Monica; 6th St & Santa Monica Bl	Downtown LA; Venice Bl & Broadway	Santa Monica Bl	24 hours	Big Blue Bus Line 1 provides daytime service between West LA and Santa Monica
4	Santa Monica; 2nd St & Santa Monica Bl (owl)	Downtown LA; Venice Bl & Broadway	Santa Monica Bl	24 hours	Big Blue Bus Line 1 provides daytime service between West LA and Santa Monica
10	West Hollywood; Santa Monica Bl & San Vicente Bl	Downtown LA; Main St & Venice Bl (see notes)	Melrose Av, Temple St	Daily (4am-12:30am)	Most trips interlined with Line 48: Westbound trips originate at Avalon station and change signs to Line 10 upon reaching Main & Venice; Eastbound trips continue as Line 48 to Avalon station after reaching Temple & Figueroa
10	Larchmont; Melrose Av & Arden Bl	Downtown LA; Main St & Venice Bl (see notes)	Melrose Av, Temple St	Daily (4am-12:30am)	Most trips interlined with Line 48: Westbound trips originate at Avalon station and change signs to Line 10 upon reaching Main & Venice; Eastbound trips continue as Line 48 to Avalon station after reaching Temple & Figueroa
14	Beverly Grove; Beverly Bl & La Cienega Bl	Downtown LA; Hill St & Adams Bl (westbound; see notes); 1st St & Beaudry Av (eastbound; see notes)	Beverly Bl	24 hours	Most trips interlined with Line 37: Westbound trips originate in Culver City and change signs to line 14 upon reaching Hill & Adams; Eastbound trips continue as line 37 to Culver City after reaching 1st & Beaudry
14	Koreatown; Beverly Bl & Western Av (late nights)	Downtown LA; Hill St & Adams Bl (westbound; see notes); 1st St & Beaudry Av (eastbound; see notes)	Beverly Bl	24 hours	Most trips interlined with Line 37: Westbound trips originate in Culver City and change signs to line 14 upon reaching Hill & Adams; Eastbound trips continue as line 37 to Culver City after reaching 1st & Beaudry
16	West Hollywood; San Vicente Bl & Santa Monica Bl	Downtown LA; Alameda St & 6th St	West 3rd St	24 hours	
16	Beverly Grove; Cedars-Sinai Medical Center	Downtown LA; Alameda St & 6th St	West 3rd St	24 hours	
18	Koreatown; Wilshire/Western station	Montebello; Montebello/Commerce station	6th St, Whittier Bl	24 hours	
18	Koreatown; Wilshire/Vermont station	Montebello; Montebello/Commerce station	6th St, Whittier Bl	24 hours	
18	Koreatown; Wilshire/Vermont station	Commerce; Commerce Center (short line)	6th St, Whittier Bl	24 hours	
18	Downtown LA; 6th St & Broadway (early morning)	East Los Angeles; Whittier Bl & Garfield Av (owl)	6th St, Whittier Bl	24 hours	
18	Downtown LA; 6th St & Hope St (late night)	East Los Angeles; Whittier Bl & Garfield Av (owl)	6th St, Whittier Bl	24 hours	
20	Westwood; Westwood Bl & Wilshire Bl	Downtown LA; 5th/6th St & Main St	Wilshire Bl	24 hours	Big Blue Bus Line 2 and Line 720 provide daytime service between Westwood and Santa Monica
20	Santa Monica; Main St & Pico Bl (owl)	Downtown LA; 5th/6th St & Main St	Wilshire Bl	24 hours	Big Blue Bus Line 2 and Line 720 provide daytime service between Westwood and Santa Monica
28	Century City; Constellation Bl & Century Park W	Downtown LA; Union Station	West Olympic Bl	Daily (4:20am-1am)	
28	Miracle Mile; Fairfax Av & Olympic Bl	Downtown LA; Union Station	West Olympic Bl	Daily (4:20am-1am)	
30	Mid-City; Pico/Rimpau Transit Center	Arts District; Little Tokyo/Arts District station	West Pico Bl	24 hours	Meets Big Blue Bus Line 7 at Pico/Rimpau to provide continuing service to Santa Monica (See Pico/Rimpau Transit Center for history)
33	Santa Monica; 5th St & Santa Monica Bl	Downtown LA; LA Union Station	Venice Bl	24 hours	
33	Santa Monica; Ocean Av & Santa Monica Bl	Downtown LA; Union Station (owl)	Venice Bl	24 hours	
35	Culver City; Washington/Fairfax Transit Hub	Downtown LA; Broadway & Venice Bl (see notes)	West Washington Bl	Daily (Mon-Sat: 4:30a-12a, Sun: 5a-12a)	Some trips interlined with Line 38
35	Culver City; Washington/Fairfax Transit Hub	Downtown LA; 7th St & Maple Av (evenings)	West Washington Bl	Daily (Mon-Sat: 4:30a-12a, Sun: 5a-12a)	Some trips interlined with Line 38
37	Culver City; Washington/Fairfax Transit Hub	Downtown LA; 1st St & Beaudry Av (westbound; see notes); Hill St & Adams Bl (eastbound; see notes)	West Adams Bl	24 hours	Most trips interlined with Line 14: Westbound trips originate in Beverly Hills and change signs to line 14 upon reaching 1st & Beaudry; Eastbound trips continue as line 14 to Beverly Hills after reaching Hill & Adams
37	West Adams; Adams Bl & La Brea Av (owl)	Downtown LA; 1st St & Beaudry Av (westbound; see notes); Hill St & Adams Bl (eastbound; see notes)	West Adams Bl	24 hours	Most trips interlined with Line 14: Westbound trips originate in Beverly Hills and change signs to line 14 upon reaching 1st & Beaudry; Eastbound trips continue as line 14 to Beverly Hills after reaching Hill & Adams
38	Culver City; Washington/Fairfax Transit Hub	Downtown LA; Broadway & Venice Bl	West Jefferson Bl	Daily (5a-12a)	Most trips interlined with Line 35
38	Culver City; Washington/Fairfax Transit Hub	Downtown LA; Spring St & 7th St (evenings)	West Jefferson Bl	Daily (5a-12a)	Most trips interlined with Line 35
38	West Adams; Jefferson Bl & La Brea Av (evenings)	Downtown LA; Hill St & Adams Bl (owl)	West Jefferson Bl	Daily (5a-12a)	Most trips interlined with Line 35
40	Downtown LA; Union Station	Redondo Beach; Redondo Beach Transit Center	West Martin Luther King Jr. Bl, Crenshaw Bl, Florence Av, Hawthorne Bl	24 hours	
40	Downtown LA; Union Station	Westchester; LAX/Metro Transit Center (owl)	West Martin Luther King Jr. Bl, Crenshaw Bl, Florence Av, Hawthorne Bl	24 hours	
45	Lincoln Heights; Broadway & Thomas St	South LA; Harbor Freeway station	Broadway	24 hours	
48	Downtown LA; Main St & Venice Bl (northbound; see notes); Temple St & Figueroa St (southbound; see notes)	South LA; Avalon station	South Main St, Maple Av, San Pedro St	Daily (5a-11p)	Most trips interlined with Line 10: Northbound trips change signs to Line 10 upon reaching Main & Venice; Southbound trips originate in West Hollywood and continue as Line 48 to Avalon station after reaching Temple & Figueroa
48	Downtown LA; Main St & Venice Bl (northbound; see notes); Temple St & Figueroa St (southbound; see notes)	South LA; San Pedro St & Manchester Av	South Main St, Maple Av, San Pedro St	Daily (5a-11p)	Most trips interlined with Line 10: Northbound trips change signs to Line 10 upon reaching Main & Venice; Southbound trips originate in West Hollywood and continue as Line 48 to Avalon station after reaching Temple & Figueroa
51	Westlake; Westlake/MacArthur Park station	Carson; CSU Dominguez Hills	Avalon Bl, San Pedro St, 7th St	24 hours	
51	Downtown LA; 7th Street/Metro Center (short line)	Carson; CSU Dominguez Hills	Avalon Bl, San Pedro St, 7th St	24 hours	
51	Downtown LA; 7th St & Broadway (owl)	Florence; Avalon Bl & Florence Av (owl)	Avalon Bl, San Pedro St, 7th St	24 hours	
53	Downtown LA; Beaudry Av & 4th St (northbound); Grand Av & 2nd St (southbound)	Carson; CSU Dominguez Hills	Central Av	Daily (4:30a-12a)	
53	Downtown LA; Beaudry Av & 4th St (northbound); Grand Av & 2nd St (southbound)	Willowbrook; Willowbrook/Rosa Parks station (short line)	Central Av	Daily (4:30a-12a)	
55	Downtown LA; Sunset Bl & Figueroa St	Willowbrook; Willowbrook/Rosa Parks station	Adams Bl, Compton Av	24 hours	
55	Downtown LA; Spring/Main St & 7th St (owl & late evening)	Willowbrook; Willowbrook/Rosa Parks station	Adams Bl, Compton Av	24 hours	
60	Downtown LA; Figueroa St & Sunset Bl	Compton; Artesia station	Santa Fe Av, Pacific Bl, Long Beach Bl	24 hours	Long Beach Transit Line 51 provides daytime service between Artesia station and Downtown Long Beach station
60	Downtown LA; Figueroa St & Sunset Bl	Long Beach; Downtown Long Beach station (owl)	Santa Fe Av, Pacific Bl, Long Beach Bl	24 hours	Long Beach Transit Line 51 provides daytime service between Artesia station and Downtown Long Beach station
62	Downtown LA; Beaudry Av & 4th St (northbound); Grand Av & 3rd St (southbound)	Hawaiian Gardens; Norwalk Bl & 226th St	Telegraph Rd, Pioneer Bl	Daily (5a-11:30p)	
62	Downtown LA; Beaudry Av & 4th St (northbound); Grand Av & 3rd St (southbound)	Hawaiian Gardens; Norwalk Bl & Civic Center Dr	Telegraph Rd, Pioneer Bl	Daily (5a-11:30p)	
62	Downtown LA; Beaudry Av & 4th St (northbound); Grand Av & 3rd St (southbound)	Norwalk; Pioneer Bl & Mapledale St	Telegraph Rd, Pioneer Bl	Daily (5a-11:30p)	
66	Koreatown; Wilshire/Western station	Montebello; Montebello/Commerce station	West 8th St, East Olympic Bl	Daily (5a-1a)	
66	Koreatown; 8th St & Western Av	East LA; Commerce Center	West 8th St, East Olympic Bl	Daily (5a-1a)	
66	Koreatown; 8th St & Western Av	Boyle Heights; Soto St & Olympic Bl	West 8th St, East Olympic Bl	Daily (5a-1a)	
70	Downtown LA; 18th St and Olive St (westbound); Olive St and Venice Bl (eastbound)	El Monte; El Monte station	Cesar E Chavez Av, Garvey Av	24 hours	
74	Montebello; The Shops at Montebello	Monterey Park; Garvey Av & Atlantic Bl	Garvey Av, Mission Rd, 1st, Riggin St	Daily (4:30a-12a)	Renumbered from Line 106 to fit into the grid
74	East LA; East LA College Transit Center (short line)	Monterey Park; Garvey Av & Atlantic Bl	Garvey Av, Mission Rd, 1st, Riggin St	Daily (4:30a-12a)	Renumbered from Line 106 to fit into the grid
76	Downtown LA; 18th St & Olive St (westbound); Olive St & Venice Bl (eastbound)	El Monte; El Monte station	Valley Bl, North Main St	24 hours	
76	Downtown LA; Grand Av/Olive St & 7th St (evening/owl)	El Monte; El Monte station	Valley Bl, North Main St	24 hours	
78	Downtown LA; 18th St & Olive St (westbound); Olive St & Venice Bl (eastbound)	Temple City; Live Oak Av & McCulloch Av	Mission Rd, Main St/Las Tunas Dr	Daily (6a-12:30a)	
78	Downtown LA; Grand Av & 7th St (westbound, evening/owl); Olive St & 7th St (eastbound, evening/owl)	Alhambra; Main St & Garfield Av (short turn)	Mission Rd, Main St/Las Tunas Dr	Daily (6a-12:30a)	
81	Eagle Rock; Colorado Bl & Eagledale Av	South LA; Harbor Freeway station	Figueroa St	24 hours	
90	North Hollywood; North Hollywood station	Downtown LA; Historic Broadway Station	Glendale Av, Cañada Bl, Foothill Bl, Sunland Bl, Vineland Av	Daily (5:30a-11p)	
90	North Hollywood; North Hollywood station	Glendale; Glendale Av & San Fernando Road (late evenings)	Glendale Av, Cañada Bl, Foothill Bl, Sunland Bl, Vineland Av	Daily (5:30a-11p)	
92	Burbank; Downtown Burbank station (late evenings & owl)	Downtown LA; Main St & Olympic Bl	Glenoaks Bl, Brand Bl, Glendale Bl	24 hours	
92	Sylmar; Sylmar/San Fernando station	Downtown LA; Main St & Olympic Bl	Glenoaks Bl, Brand Bl, Glendale Bl	24 hours	
93	Glendale; Glendale Galleria	Downtown LA; Grand/LATTC station	Pacific Av, San Fernando Road, Allesandro St, Rampart Bl, Hoover St	Daily (5a-11:30p)	Operated by MV Transportation
94	North Hollywood; North Hollywood station	Downtown LA; Hill St & Venice Bl	Magnolia Bl, San Fernando Road	Daily (Mon-Sat: 5a-1a, Sun: 6:30a-1a)	

=== 100s (Local east/west routes in other areas) ===
East/west service, not necessarily serving Downtown Los Angeles.

Route	Terminals		via	Days of operation	Notes
102	Westchester; LAX/Metro Transit Center	Huntington Park; Palm Pl & Seville Av	La Tijera Bl, Stocker St, Exposition Bl, Jefferson Bl	Daily (6a-12a)	
102	Westchester; LAX/Metro Transit Center	University Park; Jefferson/USC station	La Tijera Bl, Stocker St, Exposition Bl, Jefferson Bl	Daily (6a-12a)	
105	West Hollywood; Santa Monica Bl & San Vicente Bl	Vernon; Pacific Bl & Santa Fe Av	La Cienega Bl, Vernon Av	24 hours	
105	Leimert Park; Martin Luther King Jr. station (late evenings & owl)	Vernon; Pacific Bl & Santa Fe Av	La Cienega Bl, Vernon Av	24 hours	
108	Marina Del Rey; Washington Bl & Palawan Wy	Pico Rivera; Slauson Av & Passons Bl	Slauson Av	Daily (5a-10:30p)	
108	Culver City; Mesmer Av & Major St (short line)	Commerce; Slauson Av & Eastern Av (short line)	Slauson Av	Daily (5a-10:30p)	
110	Culver City; Culver City Transit Center	Bell Gardens; Granger Av & Florence Av	Centinela Av, Hyde Park Bl, Gage Av (daily); Jefferson Bl (weekdays)	Daily (6a-11p)	
110	Playa Vista; Jefferson Bl & Waters Edge Wy (select trips)	Bell Gardens; Granger Av & Florence Av	Centinela Av, Hyde Park Bl, Gage Av (daily); Jefferson Bl (weekdays)	Daily (6a-11p)	
111	Westchester; LAX/Metro Transit Center	Norwalk; Norwalk station	Florence Av	24 hours	
111	Inglewood; Inglewood Transit Center (short turn)	Bell Gardens; Florence Av & Garfield Av (short turn)	Florence Av	24 hours	
111	Inglewood; Downtown Inglewood station (short turn, early AM)	Bell Gardens; Florence Av & Garfield Av (short turn)	Florence Av	24 hours	
115	Playa Del Rey; Pacific Av & Culver Bl	Norwalk; Norwalk station	Manchester Av/Bl, Firestone Bl	Daily (Mon-Fri: 5a-12a, Sat/Sun: 6a-11:30p)	
115	Westchester; Manchester Bl & Sepulveda Bl	Norwalk; Norwalk station	Manchester Av/Bl, Firestone Bl	Daily (Mon-Fri: 5a-12a, Sat/Sun: 6a-11:30p)	
117	Westchester; LAX/Metro Transit Center	Downey; Lakewood Boulevard station	Century Bl, 103rd St, Tweedy Bl, Imperial Hwy	Daily (5:30a-1a)	
120	Westchester; LAX/Metro Transit Center	Whittier; Whittwood Town Center	Imperial Hwy, Telegraph Rd,	Daily (5:30a-12a)	
120	Westchester; LAX/Metro Transit Center	Norwalk; Norwalk station	Imperial Hwy, Telegraph Rd,	Daily (5:30a-12a)	
125	El Segundo; Plaza El Segundo	Norwalk; Norwalk station	Rosecrans Av	Daily (5a-9p)	Operated by MV Transportation
127	South LA; Harbor Freeway station	Downey; Downey Depot Transportation Center	Compton Bl, Somerset Bl, Bellflower Bl	Daily (4:30a-12:15a)	
127	South LA; Harbor Freeway station	Compton; Compton station	Compton Bl, Somerset Bl, Bellflower Bl	Daily (4:30a-12:15a)	
128	Compton; Compton station	Cerritos; Cerritos Towne Center	Alondra Bl	Daily (6:30a-8:30p)	Operated by MV Transportation
134	Malibu; Pacific Coast Hwy & Trancas Canyon Rd	Santa Monica; Downtown Santa Monica station	Pacific Coast Hwy	Daily (6:30a-8p)	Buses temporarily not stopping on a 10-mile (16 km) section of Pacific Coast Hwy between Rambla Vista and Temescal Canyon Rd due to Palisades Fire recovery work.
150	Chatsworth; Chatsworth station	Encino; Ventura Bl & Zelzah Av	Topanga Canyon Bl, Ventura Bl	Daily (5a-11p)	Operates alongside Line 240 from Encino to Reseda Bl via Ventura Bl
150	Canoga Park; Canoga station (short line)	Tarzana; Ventura Bl & Reseda Bl (short line)	Topanga Canyon Bl, Ventura Bl	Daily (5a-11p)	Operates alongside Line 240 from Encino to Reseda Bl via Ventura Bl
152	West Hills; West Hills Medical Center	North Hollywood; North Hollywood station	Fallbrook Av, Roscoe Bl, Lankershim Bl	Daily (4:30a-12:30a)	
154	Burbank; Downtown Burbank station	Van Nuys; Sepulveda station	Oxnard St, Burbank Bl	Daily (5:30a-8:30p)	
155	Burbank; Downtown Burbank station	Sherman Oaks; Moorpark St & Van Nuys Bl	Olive Av, Riverside Dr, Magnolia Bl	Daily (5a-10p)	
155	Burbank; Downtown Burbank station	North Hollywood; North Hollywood station	Olive Av, Riverside Dr, Magnolia Bl	Daily (5a-10p)	
158	Chatsworth; Chatsworth station	Sherman Oaks; Moorpark St & Van Nuys Bl	Devonshire St, Woodman Av	Daily (Mon-Fri: 6a-9:30p, Sat/Sun: 7a-8p)	
161	Thousand Oaks; Thousand Oaks Transit Center	Canoga Park; Canoga station	Thousand Oaks Bl, Agoura Rd, US 101, Ventura Bl	Daily (Mon-Fri: 6a-8p, Sat/Sun: 7a-8p)	
161	Westlake Village; Westlake Bl & Townsgate Rd (short line)	Canoga Park; Canoga station	Thousand Oaks Bl, Agoura Rd, US 101, Ventura Bl	Daily (Mon-Fri: 6a-8p, Sat/Sun: 7a-8p)	
162	Woodland Hills; Fallbrook Av & Ventura Bl	North Hollywood; North Hollywood station	Fallbrook Av, Sherman Way, Vineland Av	24 hours	
162	West Hills; West Hills Medical Center (short line)	North Hollywood; North Hollywood station	Fallbrook Av, Sherman Way, Vineland Av	24 hours	
164	West Hills; Platt Av & Victory Bl	Burbank; Downtown Burbank station	Victory Bl	Daily (5:30a-11p)	
165	West Hills; Platt Av & Victory Bl	Burbank; Downtown Burbank station	Vanowen St	Daily (5:30a-11:30p)	
165	Canoga Park; Vanowen St & Topanga Cyn Bl (late evenings)	Burbank; Downtown Burbank station	Vanowen St	Daily (5:30a-11:30p)	
166	Chatsworth; Nordhoff station	Sun Valley; Glenoaks Bl & Branford St	Nordhoff St, Osborne St	Daily (6a-10:30p)	
167	Chatsworth; Chatsworth station	Studio City; Ventura Bl & Goodland Av	Plummer St, Coldwater Canyon Av	Daily (6a-11p)	
169	Canoga Park; Canoga station	Burbank; Hollywood Burbank Airport	Mulholland Dr, Valley Circle Bl, Saticoy St, Topanga Cyn Bl	Daily (6a-8:30p)	
179	Rose Hills; Rose Hill Transit Center	Arcadia; Arcadia station	Huntington Dr	Daily (Mon-Fri: 5:30a-12a, Sat/Sun: 6a-12a)	
180	Hollywood; Hollywood/Vine station	Pasadena; Pasadena City College	Hollywood Bl, Los Feliz Bl, Central Av, Colorado Bl	24 hours	
180	Hollywood; Hollywood/Vine station	Pasadena; Colorado Bl & Lake Av (owl)	Hollywood Bl, Los Feliz Bl, Central Av, Colorado Bl	24 hours	
182	East Hollywood; Vermont/Sunset station	El Sereno; Huntington Dr & Monterey Rd	York Bl, Fletcher Dr	Daily (Mon-Fri: 5a-10p, Sat/Sun: 6a-10p)	

=== 200s (Local north/south routes in other areas) ===
North/south service, not serving in Downtown Los Angeles.

Route	Terminals		via	Days of operation	Notes
202	Willowbrook; Willowbrook/Rosa Parks station	Rancho Dominguez; Del Amo Station	Willowbrook Av	Weekdays (5:30a-7p)	
204	East Hollywood; Vermont Av & Hollywood Bl	Athens; Vermont Av & 120th St	Vermont Av	24 hours	Operates alongside Metro Rapid Line 754
205	San Pedro; 6th St & Harbor Bl	Willowbrook; Willowbrook/Rosa Parks station	Western Av, Vermont Av, Wilmington Av	Daily (4:30a-10:45p)	Operated by MV Transportation
206	East Hollywood; Vermont/Sunset station	Athens; Vermont/Athens station	Normandie Av	Daily (6:15a-12:45a)	
207	Hollywood; Hollywood/Western station	Athens; Western Av & Imperial Hwy	Western Av	24 hours	
207	Hollywood; Hollywood/Western station	Hawthorne; Crenshaw station	Western Av	24 hours	
209	Jefferson Park; Expo/Crenshaw station	Gardena; Crenshaw Bl & Rosecrans Av	Arlington Av, Crenshaw Bl, Van Ness Av	Weekdays (5:30a-8:30p)	
210	Hollywood; Hollywood/Vine station	Redondo Beach; Redondo Beach Transit Center	Vine St, Western Av, Crenshaw Bl	Daily (4:30a-1:30a)	
210	Koreatown; Wilshire/Western station (short turn)	Redondo Beach; Redondo Beach Transit Center	Vine St, Western Av, Crenshaw Bl	Daily (4:30a-1:30a)	
211	Inglewood; Downtown Inglewood station	Redondo Beach; Redondo Beach Transit Center	Prairie Av	Weekday rush hours	Interlined with Line 215 at Downtown Inglewood station
212	Hollywood; Hollywood/Highland station	Hawthorne; Hawthorne/Lennox station	La Brea Av	Daily (6a-1:30a)	
215	Redondo Beach; Redondo Beach station	Inglewood; Downtown Inglewood station	Inglewood Av	Weekday rush hours	Interlined with Line 211 at Downtown Inglewood station
217	Eagle Rock; Colorado Bl & Eagle Dale Av	West Adams; La Cienega/Jefferson station	Colorado Bl, Broadway, Brand Bl, Los Feliz Bl, Hollywood Bl, Fairfax Av	24 hours	
217	East Hollywood; Vermont/Santa Monica station (owl)	West Adams; La Cienega/Jefferson station	Colorado Bl, Broadway, Brand Bl, Los Feliz Bl, Hollywood Bl, Fairfax Av	24 hours	
218	Studio City; Ventura Pl & Ventura Bl	Beverly Grove; Cedars-Sinai Medical Center	Laurel Canyon Bl	Daily (Mon-Fri: 5a-9:30p, Sat/Sun: 6a-9:30p)	Operated by Southland Transit
222	Sun Valley; Roscoe Bl & Lankershim Bl	Hollywood; Hollywood/Vine station	Hollywood Wy, Cahuenga Bl	Daily (5a-11p)	
224	Sylmar; Olive View–UCLA Medical Center	Studio City; Universal City/Studio City station	Lankershim Bl, San Fernando Road	24 hours	
224	Sylmar; Sylmar station (short turn)	Hollywood; Highland Av & Santa Monica Bl (owl)	Lankershim Bl, San Fernando Road	24 hours	
230	Sylmar; Sylmar/San Fernando station	Studio City; Laurel Canyon Bl & Ventura Bl	Laurel Canyon Bl	Daily (Mon-Fri: 5:30a-10:30p; Sat: 6a-10p; Sun: 7a-10p)	
232	Westchester; LAX/Metro Transit Center	Long Beach; Downtown Long Beach station	Sepulveda Bl, Pacific Coast Hwy, Anaheim St	Daily (Mon-Fri: 3:45a-11:45p, Sat/Sun: 4:45a-11:45p)	Operated by MV Transportation
233	Lake View Terrace; Eldridge Av & Terra Bella St	Sherman Oaks; Moorpark St & Van Nuys Bl	Van Nuys Bl	24 hours	Operates alongside Metro Rapid Line 761 which provides daytime service between West LA and Sherman Oaks
233	Pacoima; Van Nuys Bl & Glenoaks Bl (short line)	West LA Expo/Sepulveda station (late night)	Van Nuys Bl	24 hours	Operates alongside Metro Rapid Line 761 which provides daytime service between West LA and Sherman Oaks
234	Sherman Oaks; Sherman Oaks Galleria	Sylmar; Los Angeles Mission College	Sepulveda Bl, Brand Bl	24 hours	
234	Sherman Oaks; Sherman Oaks Galleria	Sylmar; Sylmar/San Fernando station (short line)	Sepulveda Bl, Brand Bl	24 hours	
235	Encino; Balboa Bl & Ventura Bl	Sylmar; Sylmar/San Fernando station	Balboa Bl, Glenoaks Bl	Weekdays (5a-10p)	
236	Encino; Balboa Bl & Ventura Bl	Sylmar; Sylmar/San Fernando station	Balboa Bl, Rinaldi St	Daily (Mon-Fri: 5a-10p; Sat/Sun: 7a-8p)	
237	Encino; Ventura Bl & Zelzah Av	North Hollywood; North Hollywood station	White Oak Av, Rinaldi St, Woodley Av	Daily (5a-10:30p)	
237	Van Nuys; Van Nuys station	North Hollywood; North Hollywood station	White Oak Av, Rinaldi St, Woodley Av	Daily (5a-10:30p)	
240	Northridge; Reseda Bl & Devonshire St	Studio City; Universal City/Studio City station	Reseda Bl, Ventura Bl	24 hours	Operates alongside Line 150 on Ventura Bl from Universal City/Studio City station to Reseda Bl
240	Northridge; Reseda Bl & Devonshire St	Tarzana; Reseda Bl & Ventura Bl	Reseda Bl, Ventura Bl	24 hours	Operates alongside Line 150 on Ventura Bl from Universal City/Studio City station to Reseda Bl
242	Northridge; Devonshire St & Winnetka Av	Woodland Hills; Ventura Bl & Winnetka Av	Tampa Av	Daily (Mon-Fri: 5a-8:30p, Sat/Sun: 5:45a-7:30p)	
243	Northridge; Devonshire St & Winnetka Av	Woodland Hills; Ventura Bl & Winnetka Av	Mason Av, Winnetka Av	Daily (Mon-Fri: 5a-8:30p, Sat/Sun: 6a-7p)	
244	Chatsworth; Chatsworth station	Woodland Hills; Ventura Bl & Topanga Cyn Bl	De Soto Av	Daily (Mon-Fri: 4:30a-9:30p, Sat/Sun: 5a-8:30p)	
246	Harbor Gateway; Harbor Gateway Transit Center	San Pedro; Point Fermin (Paseo Del Mar & Meyler)	Avalon Bl, Pacific Av	24 hours	
246	Harbor Gateway; Harbor Gateway Transit Center	San Pedro; Pacific Av & 21st St (evenings & owl)	Avalon Bl, Pacific Av	24 hours	
251	Eagle Rock; Colorado Bl & Eagle Dale Av	Lynwood; Lynwood station	Eagle Rock Bl, Av 26, Daly St, Soto St	24 hours	
251	Cypress Park; Av 26 & Idell St	Huntington Park; Palm Pl & Seville Av	Eagle Rock Bl, Av 26, Daly St, Soto St	24 hours	
258	Highland Park; Garvanza Av & Av 63	Paramount; Paramount Bl	York Bl, Mission St, Fremont Av, Eastern Av	Daily (Mon-Fri: 6a-10p, Sat/Sun: 7a-8p)	
258	Highland Park; Garvanza Av & Av 63	East Los Angeles; Cal State LA station (weekday evenings)	York Bl, Mission St, Fremont Av, Eastern Av	Daily (Mon-Fri: 6a-10p, Sat/Sun: 7a-8p)	
260	Pasadena; Walnut St & Fair Oaks Av	Willowbrook; Willowbrook/Rosa Parks station	Fair Oaks Av, Huntington Drive, Atlantic Bl & Imperial Hwy	Daily (Mon-Fri: 5a-10p, Sat/Sun: 6a-10p)	Will operate alongside Line 261 between Pasadena and Atlantic/Imperial on December 15, 2024.
261	Pasadena; Walnut St & Fair Oaks Av	Compton; Artesia station	Fair Oaks Av, Huntington Drive, Atlantic Bl & Artesia Bl	Daily (Mon-Fri: 5a-10p, Sat/Sun: 6a-10p)	Will operate alongside Line 260 between Pasadena and Atlantic/Imperial on December 15, 2024.
265	Pico Rivera; Rosemead Bl & Whittier Bl	Lakewood; Lakewood Center	Paramount Bl	Daily (Mon-Fri: 6a-8:30p, Sat/Sun: 8a-8p)	
266	Pasadena; Sierra Madre Villa station	Lakewood; Lakewood Center	Rosemead Bl, Lakewood Bl	Daily (Mon-Fri: 5a-10p, Sat/Sun: 6a-10p)	Operated by Southland Transit
267	Altadena; New York Dr & Allen Av	El Monte; El Monte station	Temple City Bl, Del Mar Bl, Colorado Bl, Allen Av	Daily (Mon-Fri: 5:30a-10p, Sat/Sun: 6a-10p)	
268	Pasadena; Sierra Madre Villa station	El Monte; El Monte station	Sierra Madre Villa Av, Sierra Madre Bl, Baldwin Av	Daily (Mon-Fri: 6a-9p, Sat/Sun: 7a-9p)	
287	Arcadia; Arcadia station	Montebello; The Shops at Montebello (weekdays)	Santa Anita Av & Tyler Av, Rush St	Daily (Mon-Fri: 5:30a-10:30p, Sat/Sun: 6a-10p)	
287	Arcadia; Arcadia station	El Monte; El Monte station (weekends)	Santa Anita Av & Tyler Av, Rush St	Daily (Mon-Fri: 5:30a-10:30p, Sat/Sun: 6a-10p)	
294	Burbank; Burbank Station	Sylmar; Sylmar/San Fernando station	San Fernando Road	Daily (5a-12:30a)	
296	Burbank; Downtown Burbank station	Lincoln Heights; Lincoln/Cypress station	Riverside Dr	Daily (Mon-Fri: 5:30a-8:30p, Sat: 6:30a-8:30p, Sun: 7a-7:30p)	Operated by Southland Transit

=== 300s (Limited-stop routes) ===
Route	Terminals		via	Days of operation	Notes
344	Rancho Palos Verdes; Palos Verdes Dr S & Seacove Dr	Harbor Gateway; Harbor Gateway Transit Center	Hawthorne Bl, Artesia Bl	Daily (5:30a-9p)	Limited-stop service on Artesia Bl between Harbor Gateway Transit Center and Hawthorne Bl, and Hawthorne Bl between Artesia Bl and Pacific Coast Hwy; Operates alongside Torrance Transit Line 8 on Hawthorne Bl and Torrance Transit Line 13 on Artesia Bl

=== 400s (Freeway express routes to/from Downtown Los Angeles) ===
Route	Terminals		via	Days of operation	Notes
460	Downtown LA; Los Angeles St & 5th St/6th St	Anaheim; Disneyland	5th St/6th St, Flower St/Figueroa St, Harbor Transitway, I-105, Rosecrans Av, Alondra Bl, Beach Bl	Daily (Mon-Fri: 3:45a-12a; Sat/Sun: 4:30a-12a)	Line has the highest ridership for the Metro Express category.; Longest bus line in the Metro system.; Operates in local service in Downtown LA, and east of Norwalk station; OC Bus accepts Metro's 30-day pass at stops where Line 460 connects to OC Bus routes in Orange County.; Serves Knott's Berry Farm and Fullerton Park and Ride.
487	Downtown LA; Los Angeles Union Station	Pasadena; Sierra Madre Villa station	El Monte Busway, Ramona St, Las Tunas Drive, San Gabriel Bl, Foothill Bl	Daily (Mon-Fri: 6a-9p; Sat/Sun: 7a-8p)	Operates in local service off the El Monte Busway.; Serves the Mission/Broadway and Del Mar Park and Ride lots in San Gabriel and Sierra Madre Villa station.
489	Downtown LA; 7th Street/Metro Center station	Temple City; Rosemead Bl & Huntington Dr	Wilshire Bl, Grand Av/Olive St, El Monte Busway, Valley Bl, Rosemead Bl	Weekday peak hours (6a-8a, 4p-7p) in the peak direction (AM: westbound, PM: eastbound)	Operates in local service off the El Monte Busway; Serves the Del Mar Park and Ride Lot in San Gabriel.

=== 500s (Freeway express routes in other areas) ===
Route	Terminals		via	Days of operation	Notes
501	North Hollywood; North Hollywood station	Pasadena; Del Mar station	SR 134	Daily (Mon-Fri: 5a-10p; Sat/Sun: 5:45a-9:30p)	Marketed as “Metro NoHo-Pasadena Express”; Also serves Burbank Media District and Glendale Galleria/Americana at Brand area due to the NextGen Plan restructure.
550	Exposition Park; McClintock Av & W Jefferson Bl	Harbor Gateway; Harbor Gateway Transit Center	I-110	Weekday peak hours (5-10a, 2:30-8:30p)	Northern half of the route originated at West Hollywood via San Vicente Bl before June 2012.; Southern half of the route between the Harbor Gateway Transit Center and San Pedro was replaced by portions of Lines 205 and 246 on Vermont Av and Gaffey St, respectively, on December 11, 2022.
577	El Monte; El Monte station	Long Beach; Cal State Long Beach	I-605, 7th St	Weekdays (5:30a-11:15p)	Serves Norwalk station and Rio Hondo College; Operated by Southland Transit

=== 600s (Shuttles/circulators) ===
Shuttles, special routes and local service within one or two adjacent neighborhoods.

Route	Terminals		via	Days of operation	Notes
601	Canoga Park; Canoga station	Woodland Hills; DeSoto Av & Burbank Bl	Canoga Av, Owensmouth Av, Burbank Bl	Daily (5a-12a)	Late-night service extended to operate via DeSoto Av, Ventura Bl, Canoga Av in clockwise direction
602	Pacific Palisades; Sunset Bl & Pacific Coast Hwy	Westwood; Westwood Bl & Wilshire Bl	Sunset Bl	Daily	Due to the Palisades Fire, the route is currently shortened and not operating in the Pacific Palisades community.
605	Boyle Heights; Los Angeles General Medical Center	Boyle Heights; Grande Vista Av & Olympic Bl	Soto St, 4th St, Lorena St	Daily	Operated by Southland Transit
611	Cudahy; Cecelia St & Atlantic Bl	South Los Angeles; Vernon station	Santa Ana St, Seville Av, Florence Av, Compton Av, Vernon Av/Pacific Bl, Leonis Bl/District Bl, Wilcox Av (operates in a loop)	Daily	
617	Beverly Hills; Beverly Dr & Pico Bl	Culver City; Culver City station	Beverly Dr, Burton Wy, Robertson Bl	Daily	
660	Altadena; Fair Oaks St & Alta Loma Dr	Pasadena; Del Mar station	Fair Oaks Av	Daily	Operates alongside Pasadena Transit Line 20 on Fair Oaks Av between Woodbury Rd. and Orange Grove Blvd. and Line 51 along Fair Oaks Av between Mountain and Walnut streets.
662	Altadena; Altadena Dr & Lake Av	Pasadena; Del Mar Station	Lake Av, Del Mar Bl, Los Robles Av, Washington Bl, Lincoln Av, Altadena Dr (operates as a circulator route)	Daily	Operates alongside Pasadena Transit Line 20 on Lake Av between Woodbury Rd. and Del Mar Blvd.
665	Monterey Hills; Rose Hill Transit Center	East Los Angeles; Indiana St & Olympic Bl	Eastern Av, City Terrace Dr, Gage Av, 1st St, Indiana St, and Olympic Bl	Daily (Mon-Fri: 5:30a-8:45p; Sat: 6a-7:45p; Sun: 8a-7:45p)	
690	Sylmar; Olive View–UCLA Medical Center	Tujunga; Summitrose St & Tinker Av	Foothill Bl	Daily (6a-11p)	

=== 700s (Rapid limited-stop routes) ===
Route	Terminals		via	Days of operation	Notes
720	Santa Monica; Downtown Santa Monica station	Downtown LA; 6th & Central	Wilshire Bl	Daily (Mon-Fri: 4:30a-1a; Sa/Su: 5a-1a)	Operates alongside Line 20, which is extended to Santa Monica when Line 720 is not in service during the night; Operates alongside Big Blue Bus Line 2 between Westwood and Santa Monica on Wilshire during the day
720	Westwood; Wilshire Bl & Westwood Bl	Downtown LA; 6th & Central	Wilshire Bl	Daily (Mon-Fri: 4:30a-1a; Sa/Su: 5a-1a)	Operates alongside Line 20, which is extended to Santa Monica when Line 720 is not in service during the night; Operates alongside Big Blue Bus Line 2 between Westwood and Santa Monica on Wilshire during the day
754	East Hollywood; Vermont Av & Hollywood Bl	Athens; Vermont Av & 120th St	Vermont Av	Daily (Mon-Fri: 5a-9:30p; Sa: 6a-9:15p; Su: 6a-8:30p)	Operates alongside Line 204
761	Sylmar; Sylmar/San Fernando station	West LA; Expo/Sepulveda station	Van Nuys Bl, Sepulveda Bl	Daily (6a-9p)	Operates alongside Line 233, which is extended to West LA when Line 761 is not in operation for the night

=== 800s (Metro Rail shuttle) ===
Line numbers 801 thru 805, and 807 are used for Metro's A, B, C, E, D and K rail lines in order of ascension. Shuttle services are numbered based on the rail's route number, plus fifty.

=== 900s (Metro Busway) ===
Route	Terminals		via	Days of operation	Notes
G Line 901	Chatsworth; Chatsworth station	North Hollywood; North Hollywood station	G Line Busway	24 hours	
J Line 910	El Monte; El Monte station	Harbor Gateway; Harbor Gateway Transit Center	El Monte Busway, Harbor Transitway	24 hours	
J Line 950	El Monte; El Monte station	San Pedro; Pacific Av/21st St	El Monte Busway, Harbor Transitway	Daily (6a-8p)	

== Fleet ==
As of November 2024, Metro operates 2,066 buses in revenue service, the third-largest fleet in North America behind New York City's Metropolitan Transportation Authority (5,840) and New Jersey's NJ Transit (2,221).

== Gallery ==
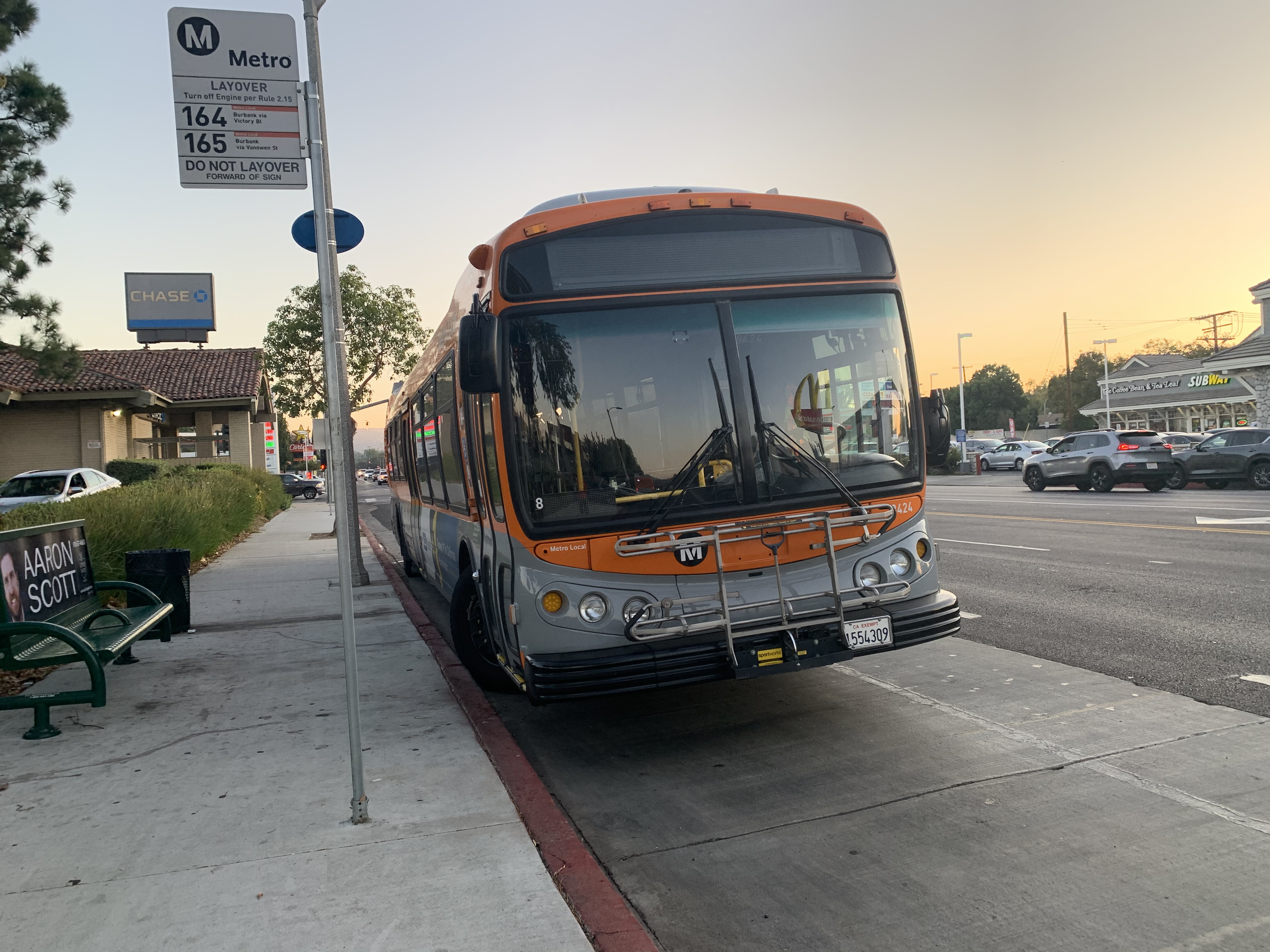
Metro Bus NABI CompoBus laying over on Platt Avenue in West Hills

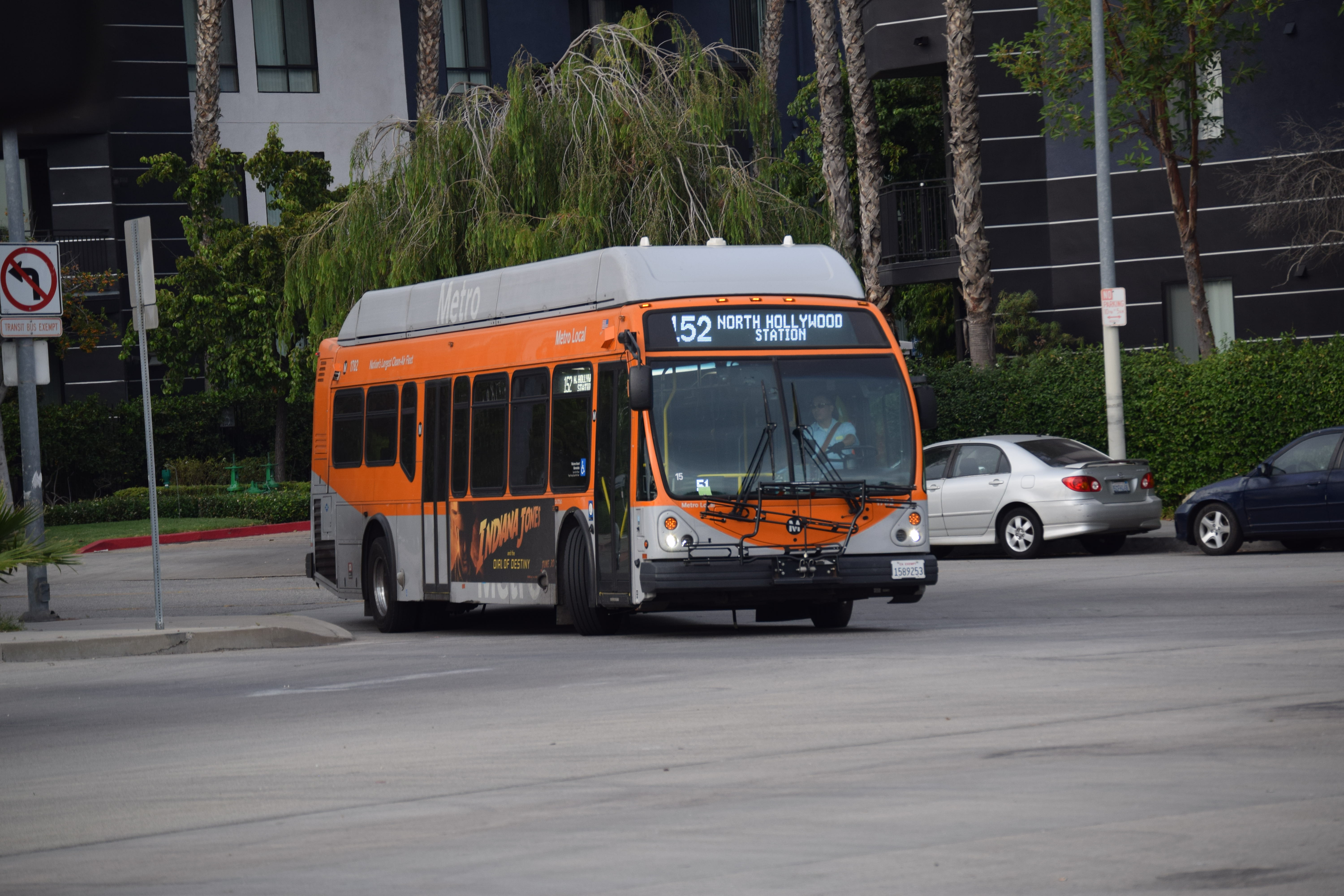
Metro Bus ENC Axess arriving at North Hollywood Station

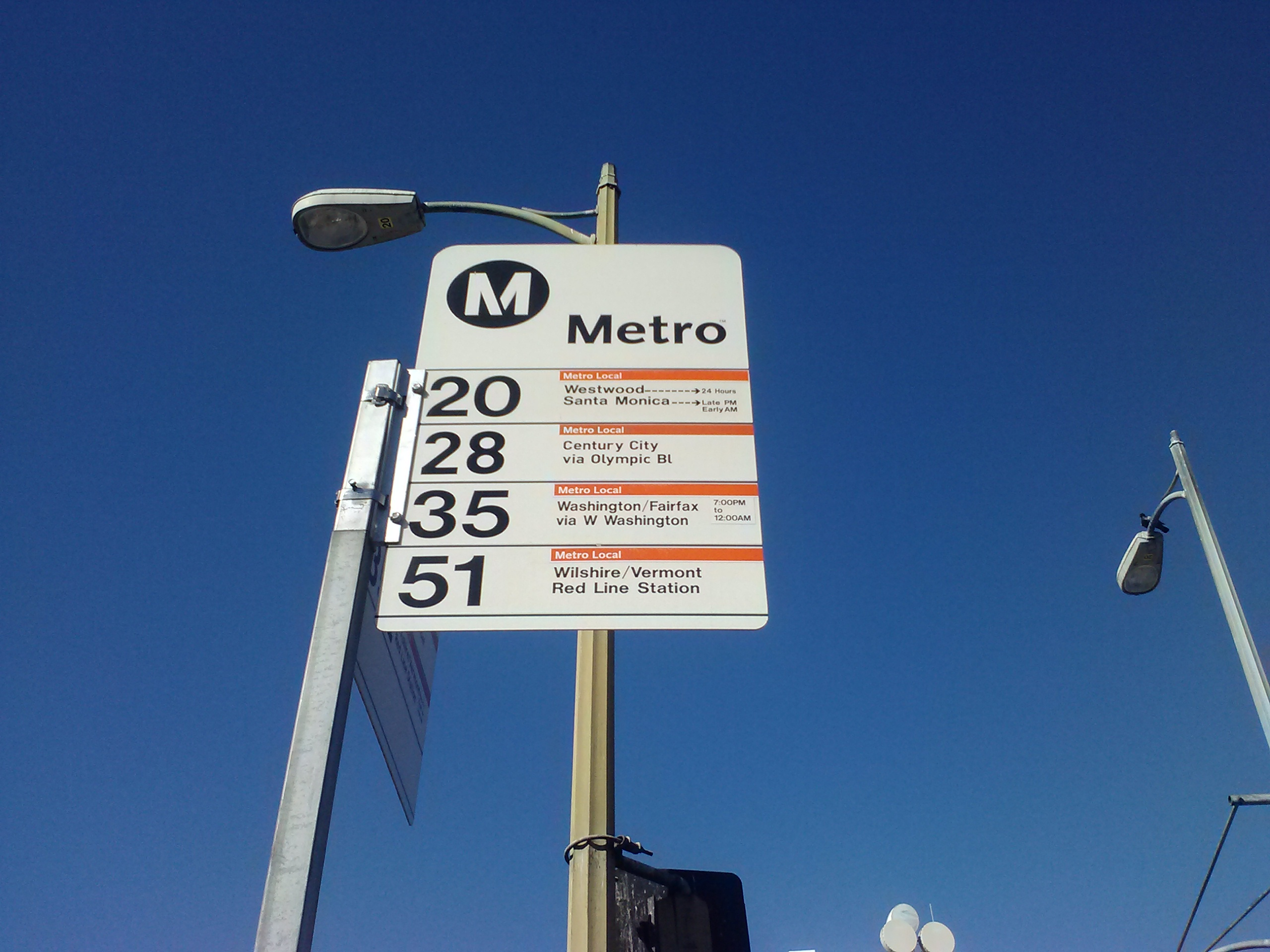
Stop in Downtown Los Angeles

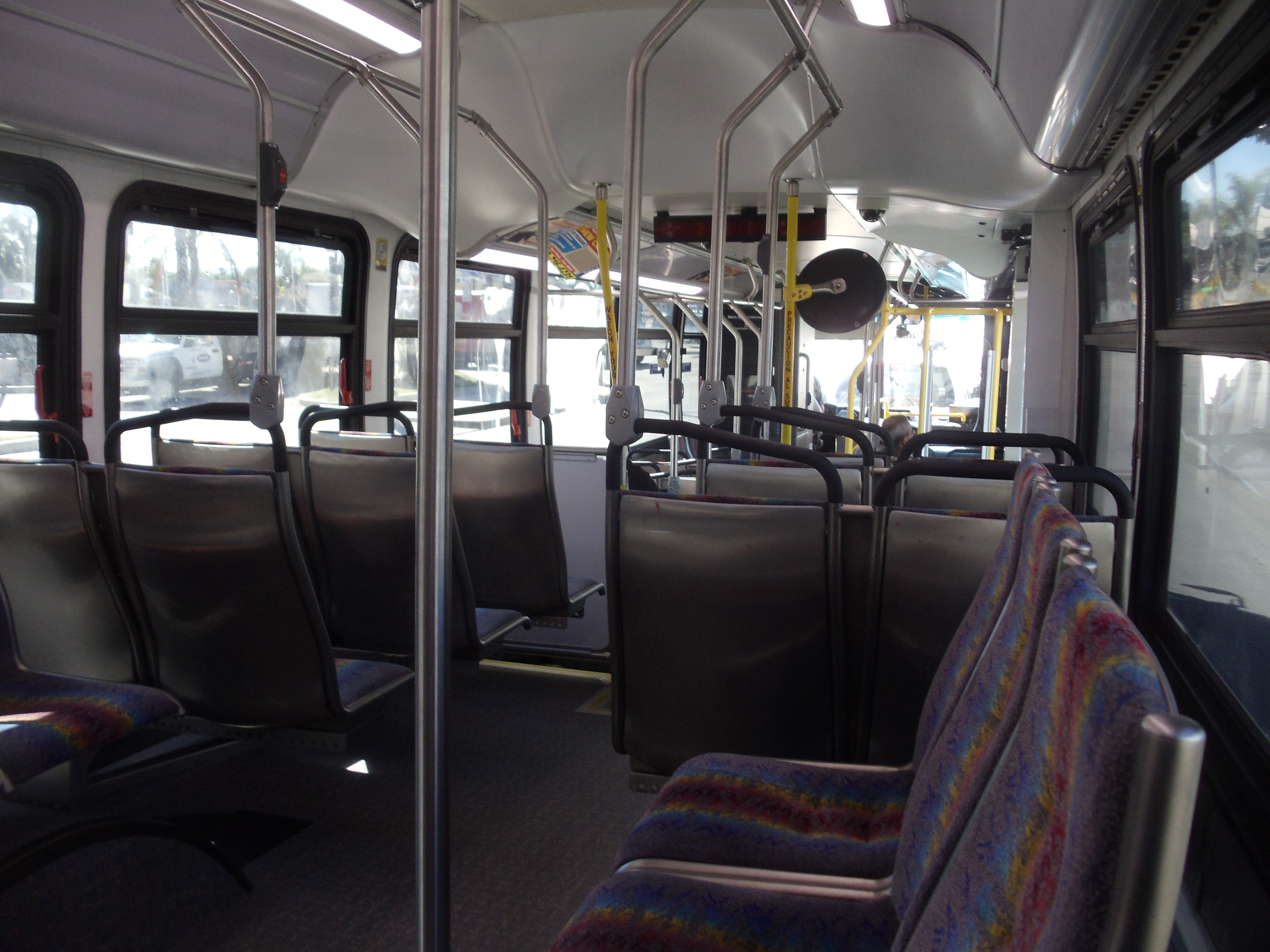
Interior of a NABI 45C bus on Metro Local Line 239.

== See also ==
- List of former Metro Local routes
- List of former Metro Rapid routes
- List of former Metro Express routes
