= Devonshire Street =

Devonshire Street may refer to:

- Devonshire Street (Los Angeles)
- Devonshire Street (Westminster)
