= Marvin Braude Mulholland Gateway Park =

Park in Los Angeles, California, United States

Coordinates: 34.131°N 118.553°W

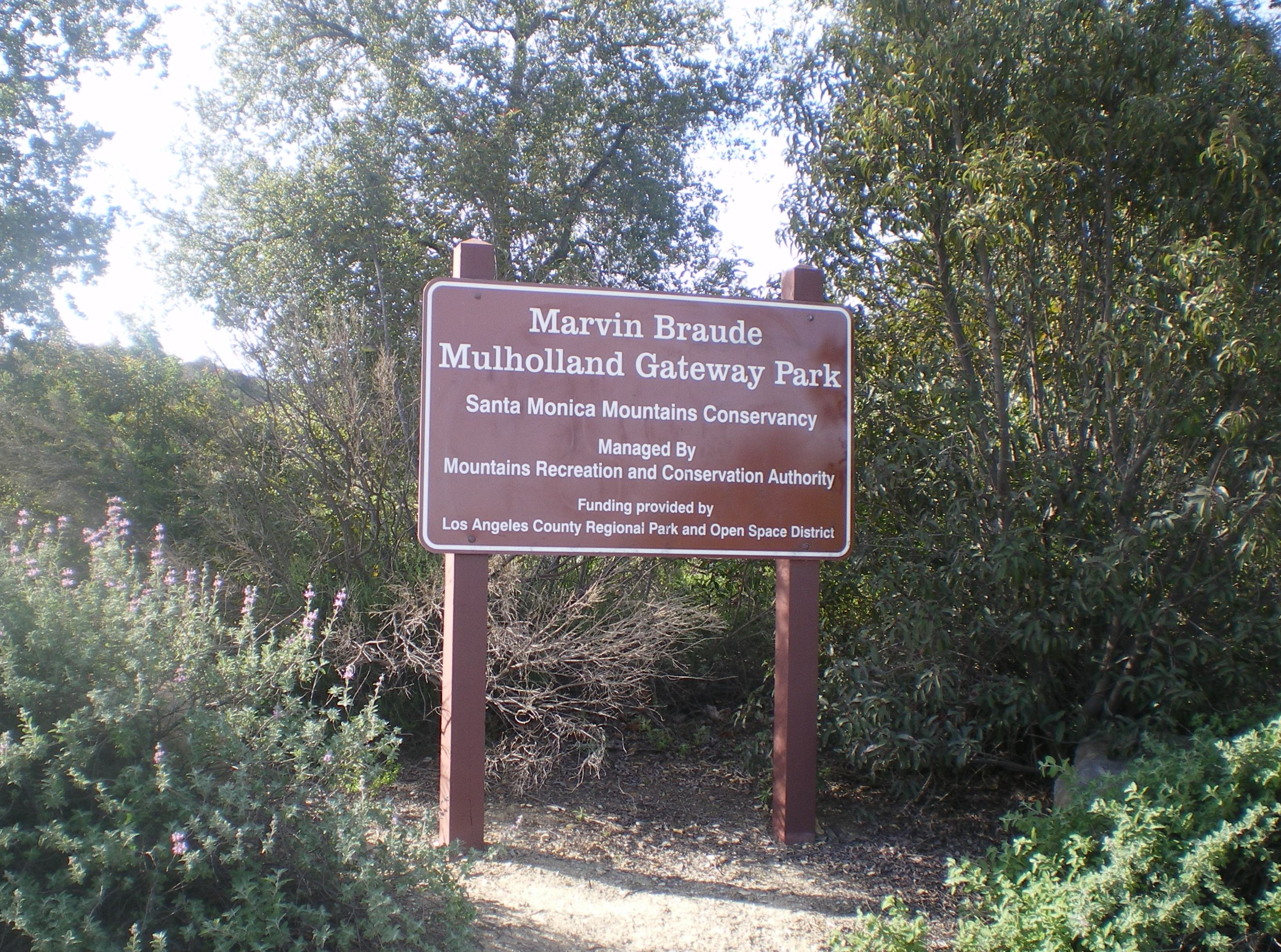
Marvin Braude Mulholland Gateway

Marvin Braude Mulholland Gateway Park is a 1,500-acre (6.1 km^{2}) park in the Santa Monica Mountains, with its trailhead at the southern terminus of Reseda Boulevard in Tarzana, Los Angeles, California. The park was named for former Los Angeles City Councilman Marvin Braude, who for more than 30 years led the effort to preserve the Santa Monica Mountains. Owned by the Santa Monica Mountains Conservancy, the park is within the Santa Monica Mountains National Recreation Area.

Marvin Braude Mulholland Gateway Park is in the California coastal sage and chaparral and the California chaparral and woodlands ecoregions.

== Trails ==
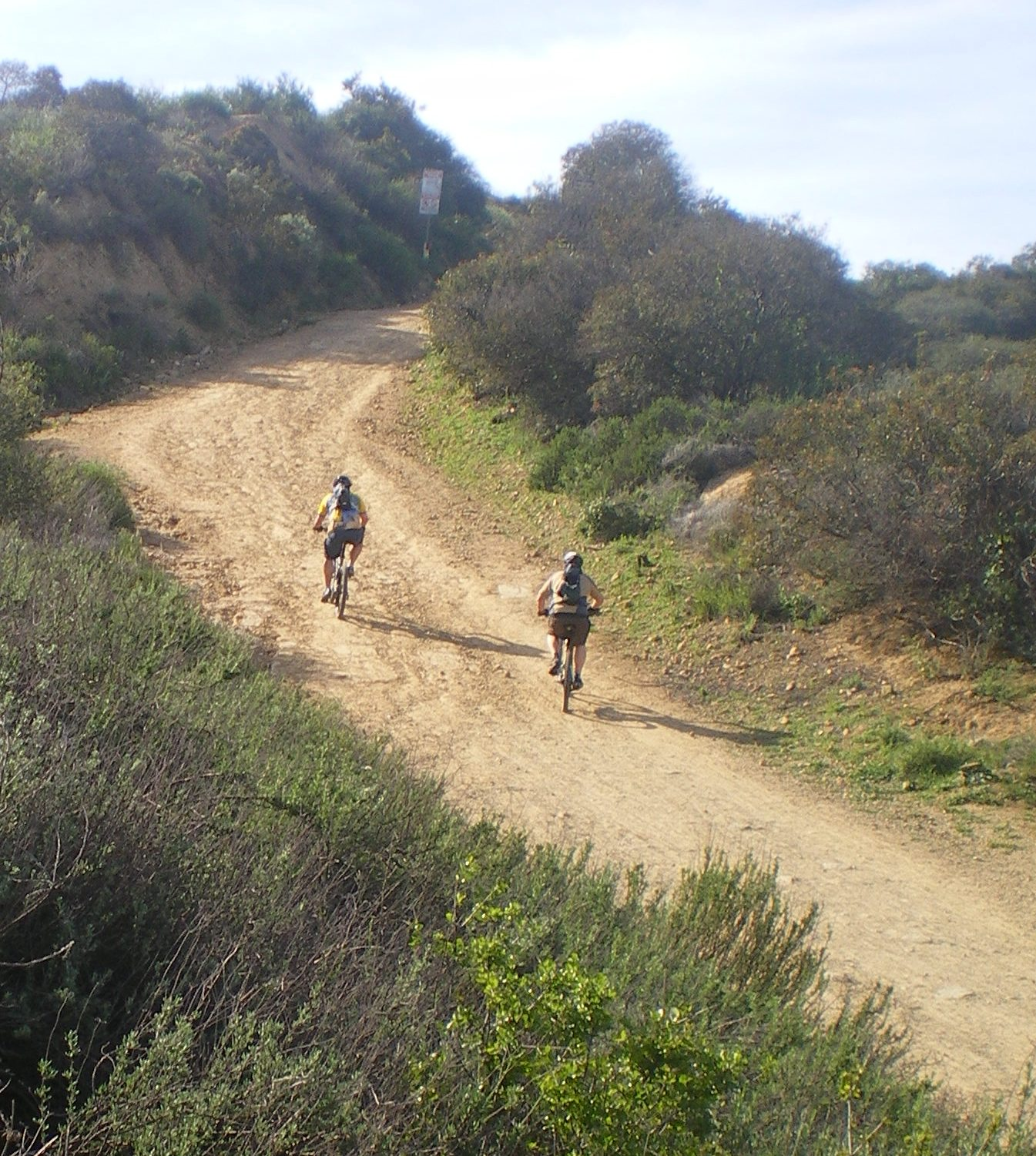
Mountain Bikers at southern terminus of Reseda Drive

Braude Park connects with 11,000-acre (45 km^{2}) Topanga State Park and the 20,000-acre (81 km^{2}) "Big Wild" to create a large expanse of undeveloped wild land offering hiking, mountain biking and equestrian trails.

On the ridgetop is the unpaved section of Mulholland Drive, closed to cars, for hiking and vistas north over the Valley and south over the Los Angeles Basin to the Pacific Ocean.

The park trails also connects with the Backbone Trail System that runs along the length of the range.

Braude Park is also the unofficial trail head for the Lemming Trail, a 10-mile (16 km) one-way hike over the mountains from the valley to the sea. Lemming Trail offers a grand tour of the Santa Monica Mountains, from Tarzana to Topanga to Temescal to the Pacific.

== Access ==
The entrance to the park is located 3.2 miles (5.1 km) south of the Ventura Freeway on Reseda Boulevard up in the mountains.

== See also ==
- Santa Monica Mountains National Recreation Area
- Flora of the Santa Monica Mountains
- Santa Monica Mountains index
- California chaparral and woodlands topics
