= Glenoaks Boulevard =

Thoroughfare in Los Angeles County, California

Coordinates: 34°14′6″N 118°22′19″W

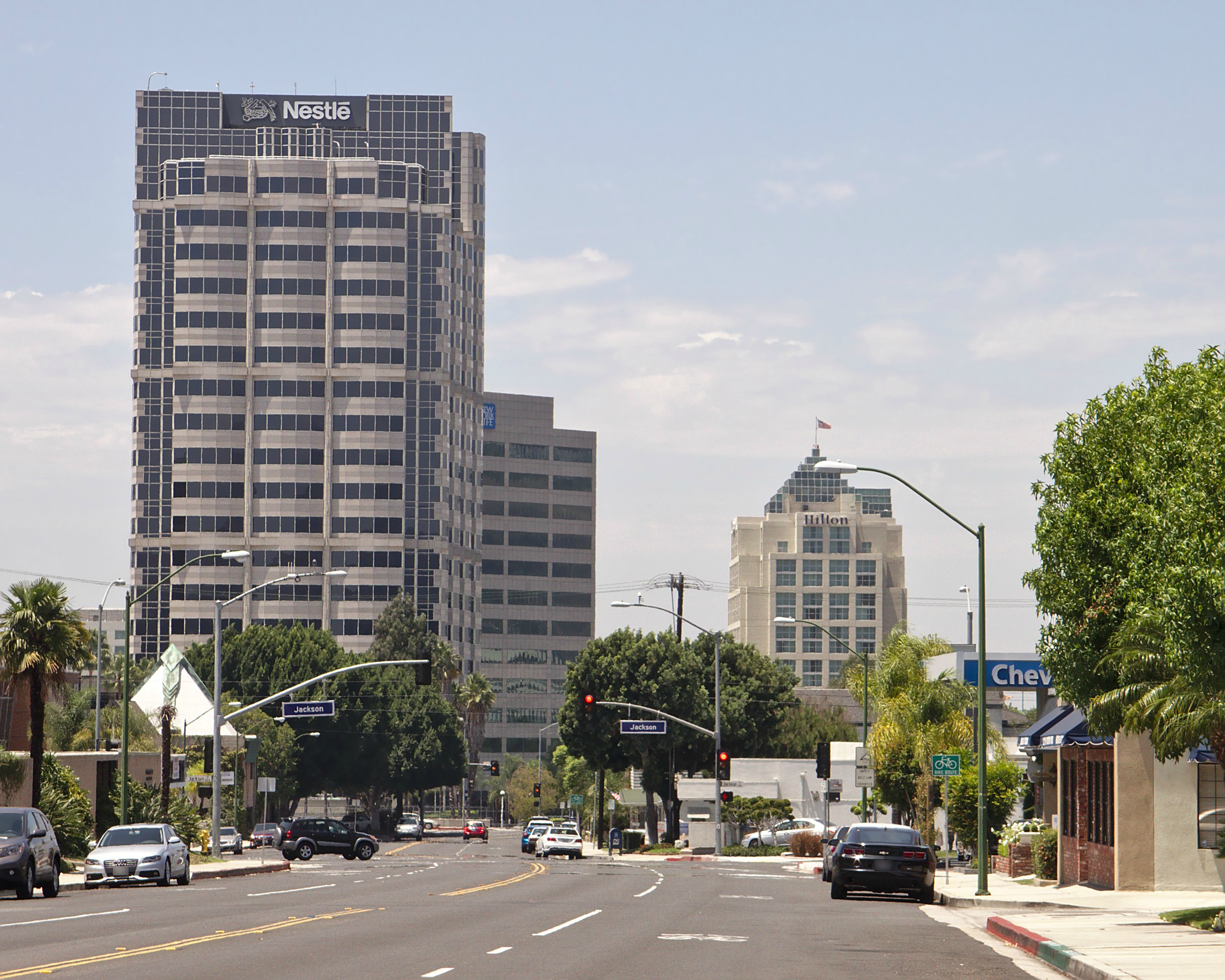
- Interactive map of Glenoaks Boulevard
- Maintained by: Bureau of Street Services, City of L.A. DPW, Co. of L.A. DPW, Burbank Public Works, Glendale Public Works, Caltrans
- Length: 22.4 mi (36.0 km)
- Northwest end: I-210 in Sylmar
- Major junctions: I-5 in Burbank
- Southeast end: SR 2 in Glendale

Glenoaks Boulevard is a major thoroughfare in Los Angeles County, which stretches some 22.4 miles as a north-south thoroughfare in Sylmar at its intersection with Foothill Boulevard to a west-east thoroughfare in Glendale before ending in the Scholl Canyon area as a minor street. It passes through much of the San Fernando Valley including San Fernando, Pacoima, and Sun Valley. It is also a north-south thoroughfare in Burbank. Glenoaks Boulevard runs east of and parallel to Interstate 5 (Golden State Freeway) in San Fernando and Burbank, and north of and parallel to State Route 134 (Ventura Freeway) in Glendale.

The median of Glenoaks Boulevard formerly carried Pacific Electric Railway trains from Brand Boulevard in Glendale to Eton Drive in Burbank. This Glendale–Burbank Line was cut back to Cypress Avenue in 1940 and replaced by buses in 1955.

== Natural disasters ==
In November 1933 a fire struck the San Gabriel Mountains above La Crescenta, burnt down the trees and weakened all the roots and soil and the cohesiveness of the mountains. A month later, on December 31, 1933, La Crescenta and the neighboring city of Glendale received more than 12 inches of rain. The rain following the fire caused trees, dirt, and boulders, the size of cars, to slide onto the streets of the city. This caused severe flooding; 39 people were found dead and 44 were missing. The property and landscaping damage to La Crescenta, Montrose and Glendale was severe. Homes and building structures were completely demolished on Glenoaks Boulevard.

The 6.5–6.7M_{w} 1971 San Fernando earthquake (also known as the Sylmar earthquake) caused more than 6 miles (9.7 km) of discontinuous surface ruptures, 64 casualties, and over $500 million in damage.

== Bridges ==
The United States Army Corps of Engineers designed and constructed three Vierendeel Truss bridges at intersections with the Verdugo Wash in Glendale to provide "a modern, aesthetic, and functionally sound solution for roadway connections on the Verdugo Flood Control Project." This was the nation's first major flood control project since the passage of the 1936 Flood Control Act.

== Nearby venues ==
Glenoaks Boulevard travels between several metropolitan cities such as Glendale and Burbank and has many popular venues in its proximity.

=== Shops and restaurants ===
Many shopping malls and plazas including the Americana at Brand, Glendale Galleria, Burbank Town Center are located within 1–2 miles (1.6–3.2 km) of Glenoaks Boulevard. Downtown Glendale and Downtown Burbank are also home to a wide array of eateries ranging from fast food to 4-star restaurants.

=== Hospitals ===
The Glendale Adventist Hospital and Glendale Memorial Hospital serve the Glendale, Burbank, and La Crescenta communities. The Kaiser Permanente Medical Offices is located on Glenoaks Boulevard between Pacific Avenue and Brand Boulevard.

=== Automotive ===
The Department of Motor Vehicles has a full service Glendale location on Glenoaks Boulevard and serves residents in cities East of Panorama City and West of Glendale and North of West Hollywood and South of La Crescenta.

=== Airports ===
Whiteman Airport and Bob Hope Airport are two domestic airports located right off of Glenoaks Boulevard.

== Transportation ==
Glenoaks Boulevard is served in Glendale by Glendale Transit line 7 and between Glendale, Burbank and San Fernando by Metro Local line 92.

== See also ==
- Burbank
- Glendale
- Los Angeles County
- San Fernando
