= Devonshire Street (Los Angeles) =

Arterial road in Los Angeles's San Fernando Valley

Devonshire Boulevard
- Namesake: Duke of Devonshire
- Maintained by: Bureau of Street Services, Los Angeles Department of Water and Power
- Length: 10 mi (16 km)
- Nearest metro station: Chatsworth
- West end: Chatsworth Park South in Chatsworth
- Major junctions: SR 27; I-405
- East end: Arleta Avenue in Pacoima

Devonshire Street is an east–west arterial road that runs for 10 miles (16 km) across the northwest San Fernando Valley in Los Angeles, California.

== Name ==
Devonshire Street was named after the numerous Dukes of Devonshire who have lived in Chatsworth House, Derbyshire, England. W.B. Barber, one of the developers of the street and its surrounding area, grew up near Chatsworth House, and it is assumed that he brought the name to the street. Prior to 1917, Devonshire Street was known as Santa Susana Pass Road, and it was also designated SR-118 before freeway that now bears that name was built.

== Route ==
Devonshire Street travels east–west across the northwest San Fernando Valley. From west to east, Devonshire Street travels through Chatsworth, Northridge, Granada Hills, Mission Hills, and into Pacoima. The street has four lanes or more for almost its entire length.

== Transit ==
Metro Local Line 158 runs along Devonshire Boulevard for almost its entire length.

The Intermodal passenger transport Chatsworth station, served by Los Angeles Metro's G Line, Metrolink (California)'s Ventura County Line, and Amtrak's Pacific Surfliner, is located on Old Plaza Depot Road between Devonshire and Lassen Street in Chatsworth. And as of spring 2024, the following additional connections are available at Chatsworth Station:

- City of Santa Clarita Transit: 791
- LADOT Commuter Express: 419
- Los Angeles Metro Bus: 150, 158, 167, 244
- Simi Valley Transit: 10

== Notable landmarks ==
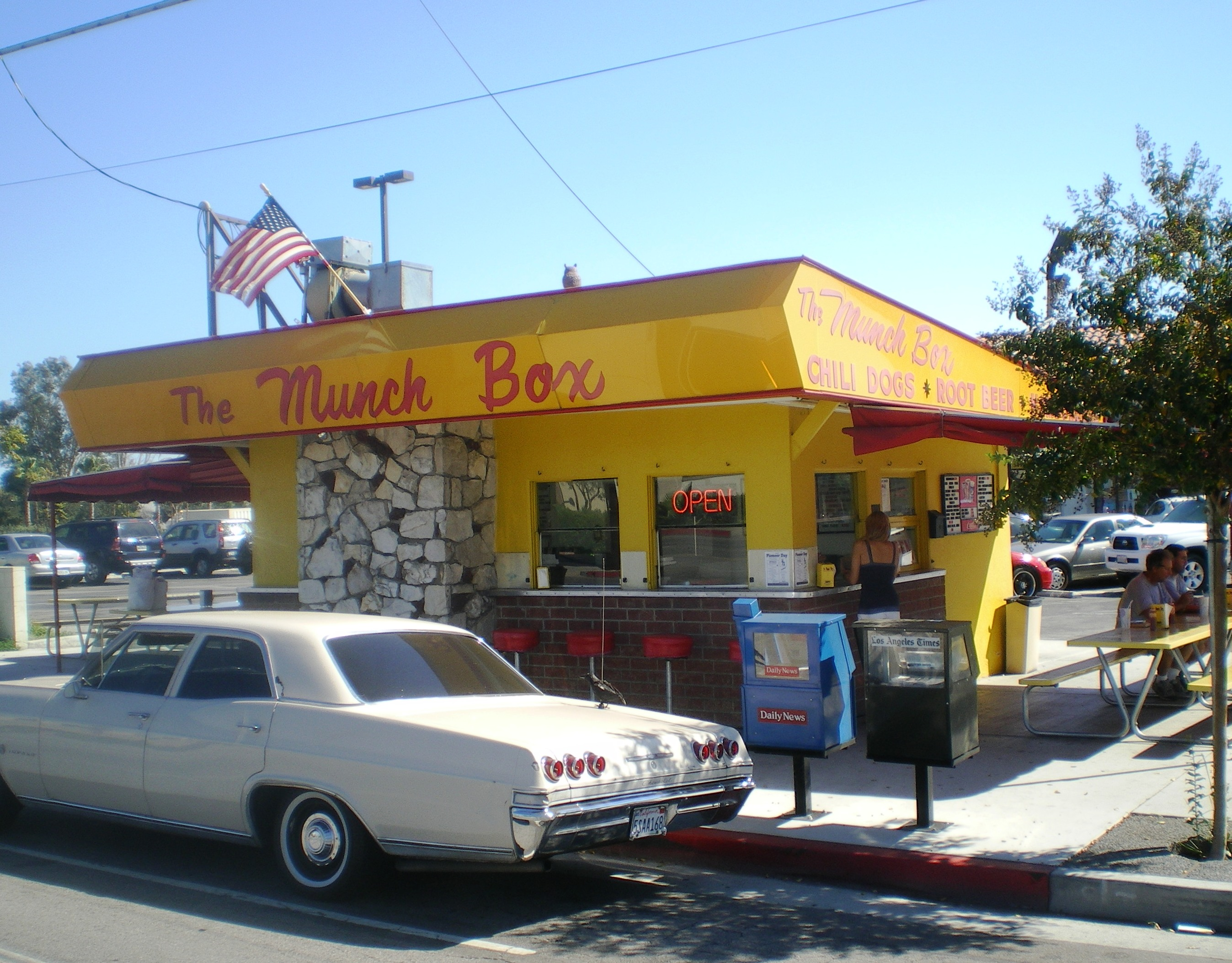
Munch Box, Los Angeles Cultural-Historic Monument #750, located at 21532 W. Devonshire Street

Three Los Angeles Cultural-Historic Monuments are located on Devonshire Street: Harvester Farms, Munch Box, and Oakridge and Grounds. Other notable landmarks include (from west to east): Chatsworth Park South, Northridge City Little League, Los Angeles Police Department Devonshire Station, LADWP Granada Hills Distribution Headquarters, Devonwood Park, Pacoima Spreading Grounds, and Devonshire Arleta Park. Devonshire Downs was also formerly located at Devonshire and Zelzah Avenue.

Schools on Devonshire include (from west to east): Chatsworth Park Elementary, Egremont School, California State University Northridge North Campus, Abraham Joshua Heschel Day School, Patrick Henry Middle School, and Granada Hills Charter TK-8.
