= Maravilla station =

Los Angeles Metro Rail station

Maravilla
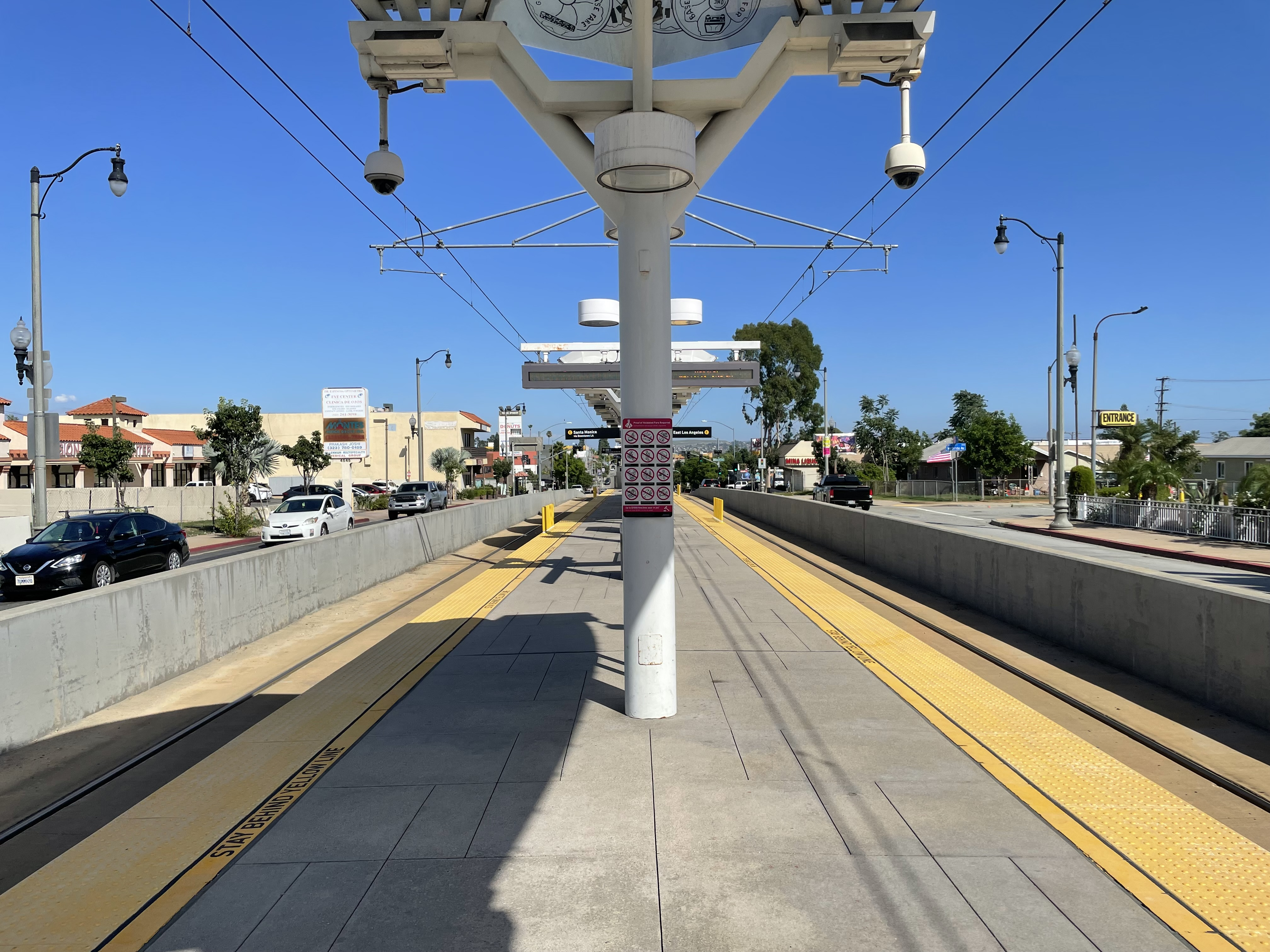
- Maravilla station platform

General information
- Location: 4520 East 3rd Street; East Los Angeles, California
- Coordinates: 34.0331°N 118.1684°W
- Owner: Los Angeles County Metropolitan Transportation Authority
- Platforms: 1 island platform
- Tracks: 2
- Connections: City of Commerce Transit; El Sol; Montebello Transit

Construction
- Structure type: At-grade
- Cycle facilities: Racks
- Accessible: Yes

History
- Opened: November 15, 2009

Passengers
- FY 2025: 376 (avg. wkdy boardings)

Services
Preceding station	Metro Rail	Following station
Indiana toward Santa Monica	E Line	East LA Civic Center toward Atlantic
Former services
Preceding station	Metro Rail	Following station
East LA Civic Center toward East Los Angeles	L Line	Indiana toward Azusa
Location

Maravilla station (/ˌmɑːrɑːˈviːʌ/) is an at-grade light rail station on the E Line of the Los Angeles Metro Rail system. It is located at the intersection of 3rd Street and Ford Boulevard in the Maravilla neighborhood of East Los Angeles, California near Interstate 710. This station opened in 2009 as part of the Gold Line Eastside Extension.

== Service ==
=== Station layout ===
Maravilla station utilizes a simple island platform setup with two tracks in the median of East 3rd Street. There are two ramps for platform access, one at the intersection with South Ford Boulevard and the other at the intersection with South McDonnell Avenue.

=== Hours and frequency ===
E Line service hours are from approximately 4:30 a.m. and 11:45 p.m daily. Trains operate every 8 minutes during peak hours, Monday to Friday. Trains run every 10 minutes, during midday on weekdays and weekends, from 9:00 a.m. to 7:00 p.m. Night and early morning service is approximately every 20 minutes every day.

=== Connections ===
As of December 15, 2024, the following connections are available:

- City of Commerce Transit: 200
- El Sol: Union Pacific/Salazar Park, Whittier Boulevard/Saybrook Park
- Montebello Transit: 40
