= Indiana station (Los Angeles Metro) =

Los Angeles Metro Rail station

Indiana
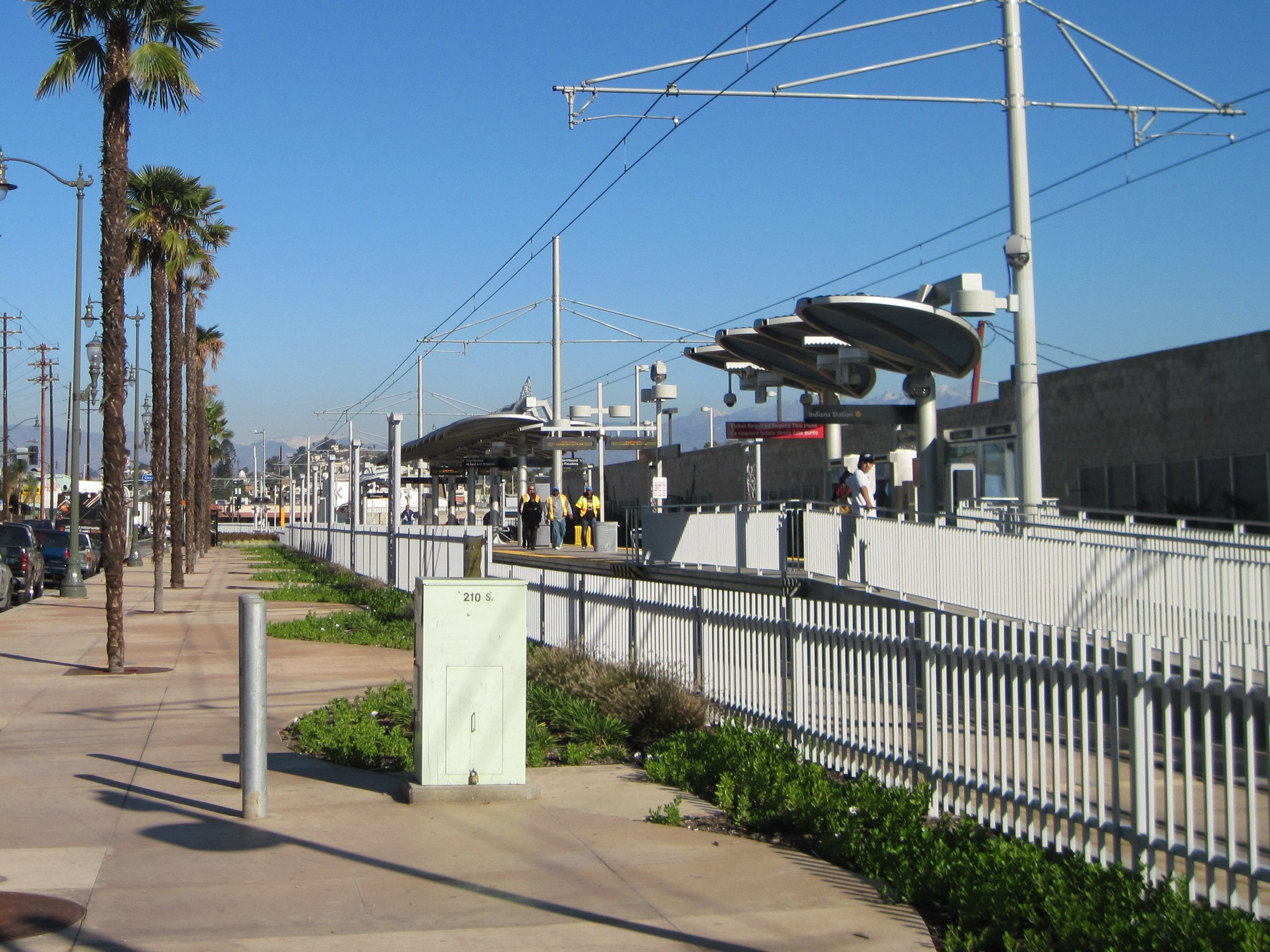
- Indiana station platform

General information
- Location: 210 South Indiana Street; Los Angeles, California
- Coordinates: 34.0343°N 118.1922°W
- Owner: Los Angeles County Metropolitan Transportation Authority
- Platforms: 1 island platform
- Tracks: 2
- Connections: El Sol; LADOT DASH; Los Angeles Metro Bus; Montebello Transit

Construction
- Structure type: At-grade
- Parking: 42 spaces
- Cycle facilities: Racks and lockers
- Accessible: Yes

History
- Opened: November 15, 2009

Passengers
- FY 2025: 846 (avg. wkdy boardings)

Services
Preceding station	Metro Rail	Following station
Soto toward Santa Monica	E Line	Maravilla toward Atlantic
Former services
Preceding station	Metro Rail	Following station
Maravilla toward East Los Angeles	L Line	Soto toward Azusa
Location

Indiana station is an at-grade light rail station on the E Line of the Los Angeles Metro Rail system. It is located alongside South Indiana Street (the station's namesake) as the line transitions between 1st Street and 3rd Street on the eastern edge of the Boyle Heights neighborhood of Los Angeles. This station opened in 2009 as part of the Gold Line Eastside Extension.

== Service ==
=== Station layout ===
Indiana station utilizes a simple island platform setup with two tracks in an exclusive right-of-way, located east of South Indiana Street. There are two ramps for platform access, one at the intersection with Gleason Avenue, which connections to the station's park and ride lot, and the other at the intersection with East 3rd Street.

=== Hours and frequency ===
E Line service hours are from approximately 4:30 a.m. and 11:45 p.m daily. Trains operate every 8 minutes during peak hours, Monday to Friday. Trains run every 10 minutes, during midday on weekdays and weekends, from 9:00 a.m. to 7:00 p.m. Night and early morning service is approximately every 20 minutes every day.

=== Connections ===
As of December 15, 2024, the following connections are available:

- El Sol: Whittier Boulevard/Saybrook Park
- LADOT DASH: Boyle Heights/East LA
- Los Angeles Metro Bus: 106, 665
- Montebello Transit: 40
