= East LA Civic Center station =

Los Angeles Metro Rail station

East LA Civic Center
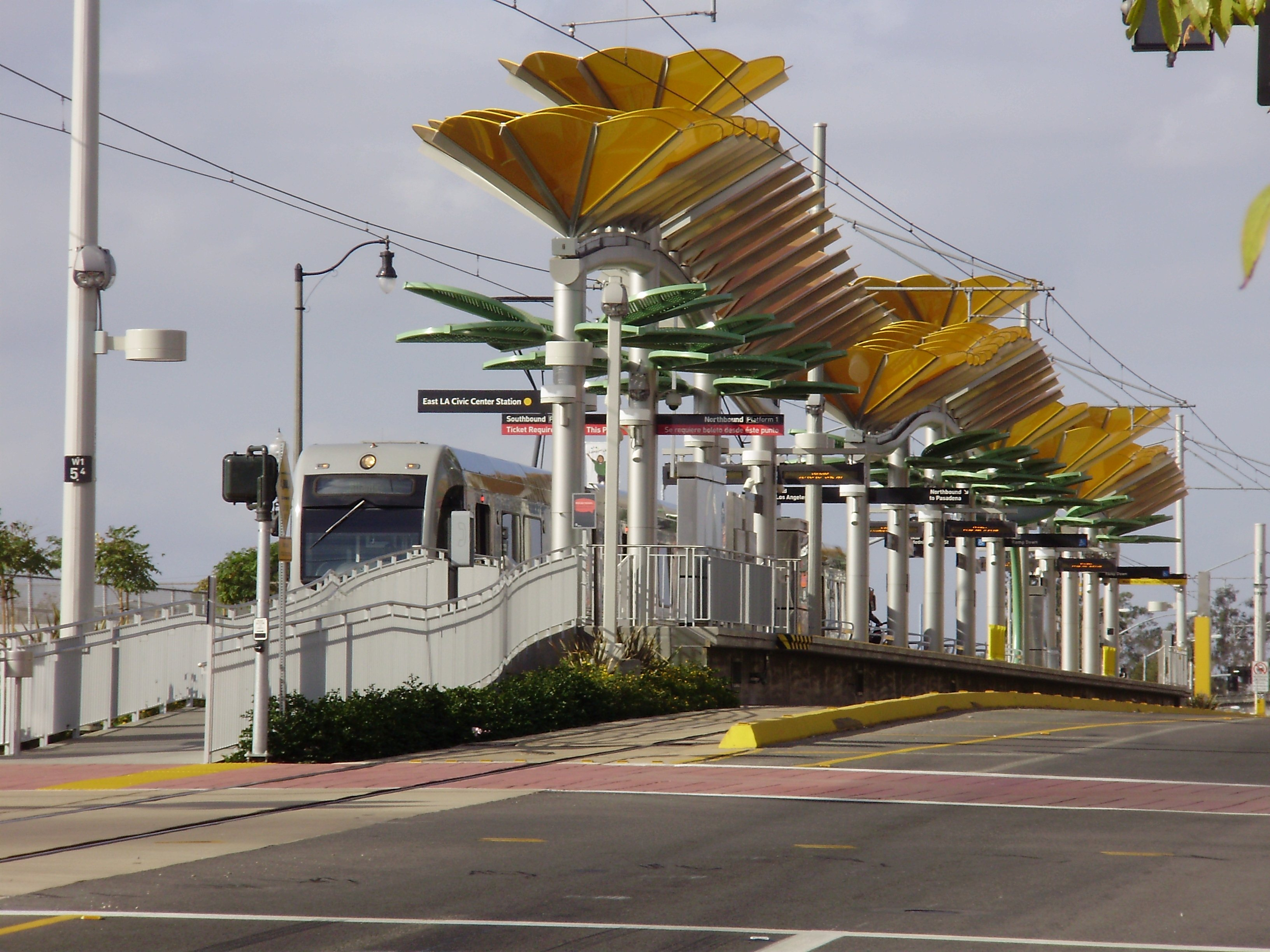
- A southbound train prepares to depart the East LA Civic Center station

General information
- Location: 4780 East 3rd Street; East Los Angeles, California
- Coordinates: 34.0332°N 118.1614°W
- Owner: Los Angeles County Metropolitan Transportation Authority
- Platforms: 1 island platform
- Tracks: 2
- Connections: El Sol; Los Angeles Metro Bus; Montebello Transit

Construction
- Structure type: At-grade
- Cycle facilities: Racks
- Accessible: Yes

History
- Opened: November 15, 2009
- Former names: 3rd/Mednik

Passengers
- FY 2025: 483 (avg. wkdy boardings)

Services
Preceding station	Metro Rail	Following station
Maravilla toward Santa Monica	E Line	Atlantic Terminus
Former services
Preceding station	Metro Rail	Following station
Atlantic Terminus	L Line	Maravilla toward Azusa
Location

East LA Civic Center station is an at-grade light rail station on the E Line of the Los Angeles Metro Rail system. It is located at the intersection of 3rd Street and Mednik Avenue in East Los Angeles, California, adjacent to the Los Angeles County government buildings of the East Los Angeles Civic Center, after which the station is named. This station opened on November 15, 2009, as part of the Gold Line Eastside Extension.

== Service ==
=== Station layout ===
East LA Civic Center station utilizes a simple island platform setup with two tracks in the median of East 3rd Street. There are two ramps for platform access, one at the intersection of Civic Center Way, leading to the namesake East LA Civic Center, and the other at the intersection of South Mednik Avenue.

=== Hours and frequency ===
E Line service hours are from approximately 4:30 a.m. and 11:45 p.m daily. Trains operate every 8 minutes during peak hours, Monday to Friday. Trains run every 10 minutes, during midday on weekdays and weekends, from 9:00 a.m. to 7:00 p.m. Night and early morning service is approximately every 20 minutes every day.

=== Connections ===
The station is located one block west the Dionicio Morales Transit Plaza, the hub for El Sol, the neighborhood shuttle bus system for East Los Angeles.

As of December 15, 2024, the following connections are available:

- El Sol: City Terrace/East Los Angeles College, Union Pacific/Salazar Park, Whittier Boulevard/Saybrook Park
- Los Angeles Metro Bus: 106, 258
- Montebello Transit: 40
