= 3rd Street (Los Angeles) =

Street in Los Angeles, California, United States

Coordinates: 34°02′00″N 118°22′31″W

3rd Street in Los Angeles is a major east–west thoroughfare. The west end is in downtown Beverly Hills by Santa Monica Boulevard, and the east is at Alameda Street in downtown Los Angeles, where it shares a one-way couplet with 4th Street. East of Alameda it becomes 4th Street, where it heads to East Los Angeles, where it turns back into 3rd Street upon crossing Indiana Street. 3rd Street eventually becomes Pomona Boulevard in Monterey Park, where it then turns into Potrero Grande Drive and finally turns into Rush Street in Rosemead and ends in El Monte.

3rd Street passes along the south side of The Grove and "The Original" Farmers Market at Fairfax Avenue, near the headquarters of The Writers Guild of America, West. There are also many other restaurants, boutiques, and antique stores on this specific strip of 3rd Street, which is less upscale and more relaxed than nearby Robertson Boulevard and Melrose Avenue.

3rd Street is parallel to two other major thoroughfares, Wilshire Boulevard to the south and Beverly Boulevard to the north. It is four lanes wide east of Doheny Drive, and it passes through the same communities as Wilshire Boulevard.

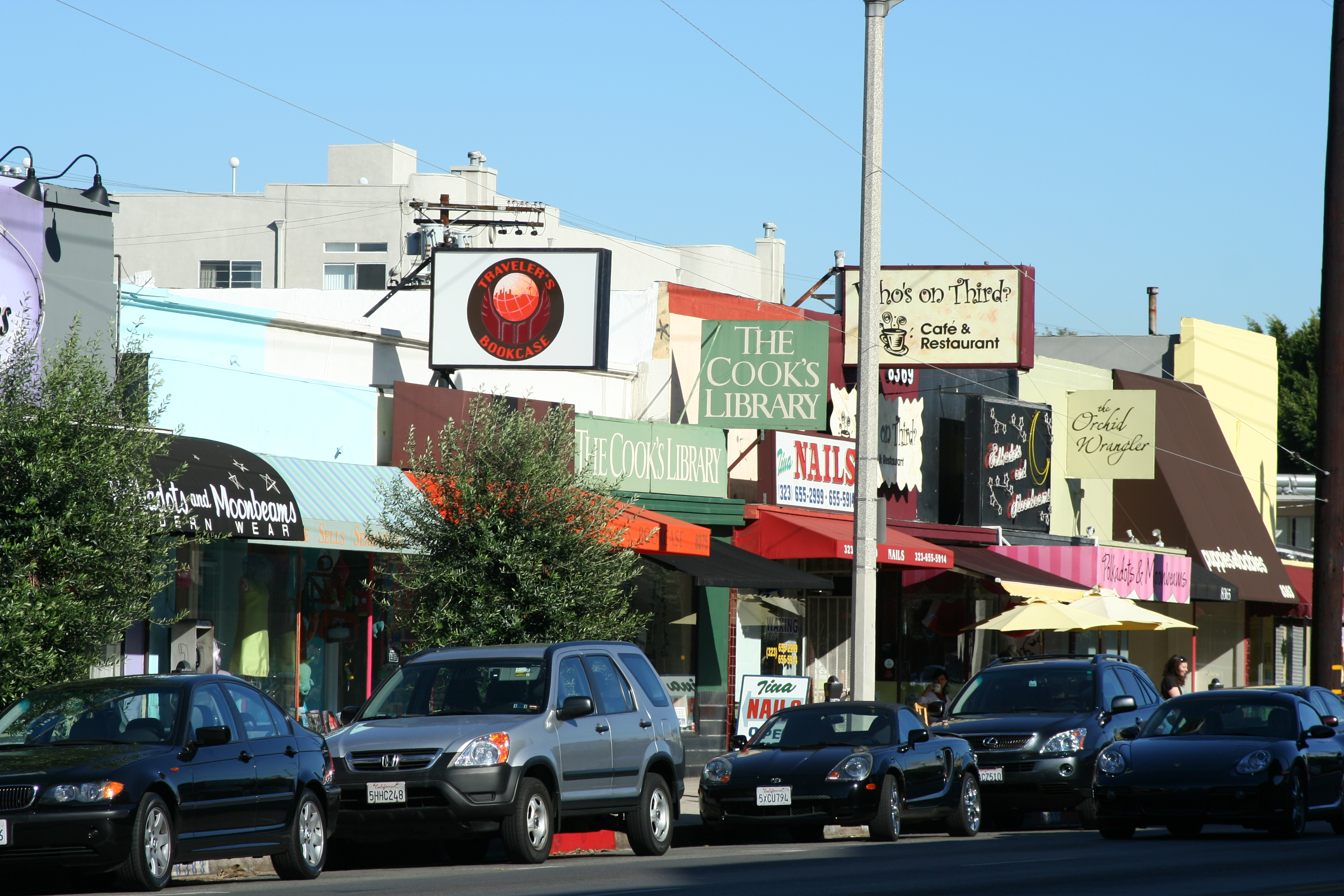
3rd Street in Los Angeles between La Cienega Boulevard and Fairfax Avenue is known for its shops and eateries

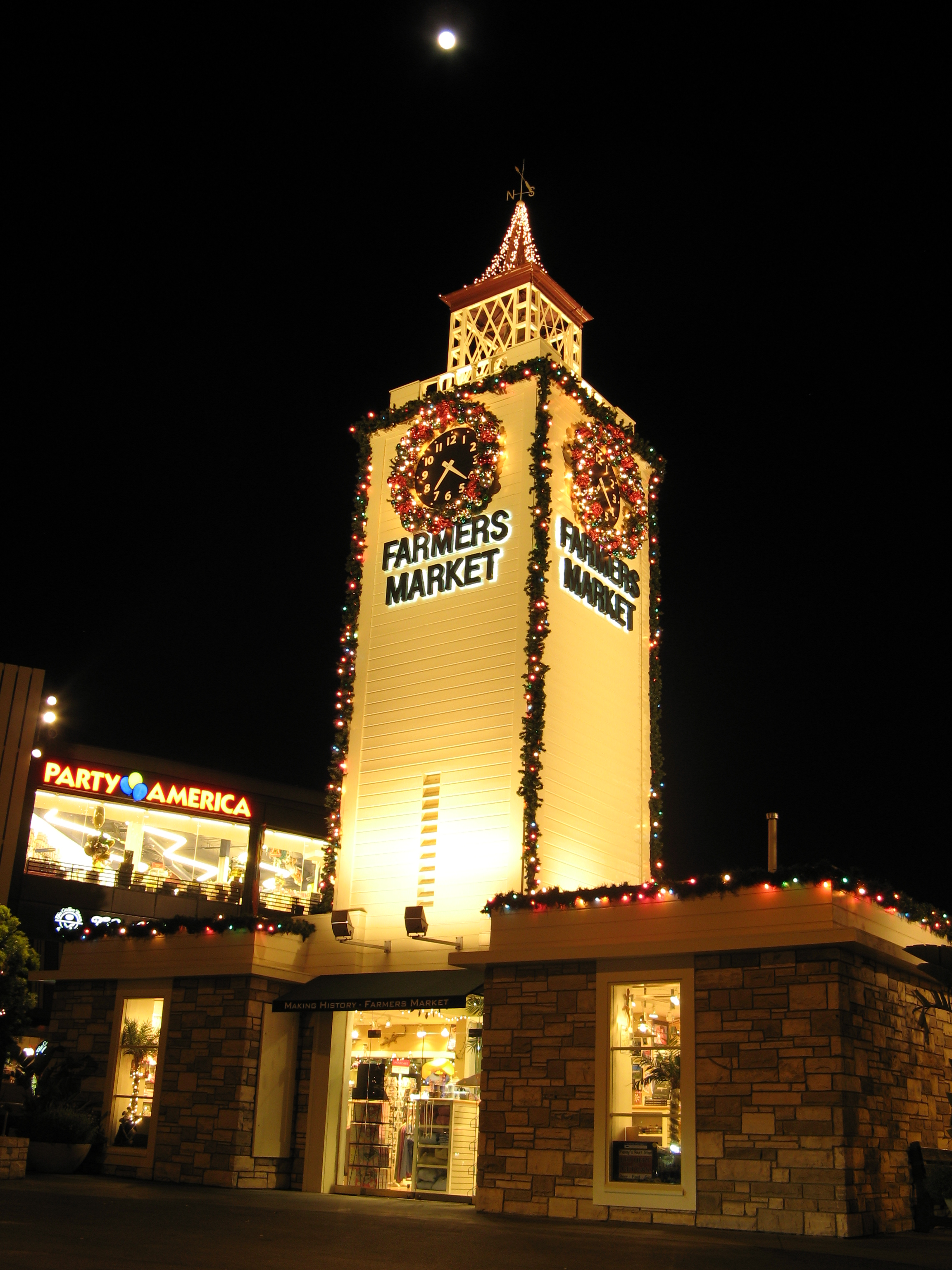
Farmers Market on 3rd Street and Fairfax Avenue

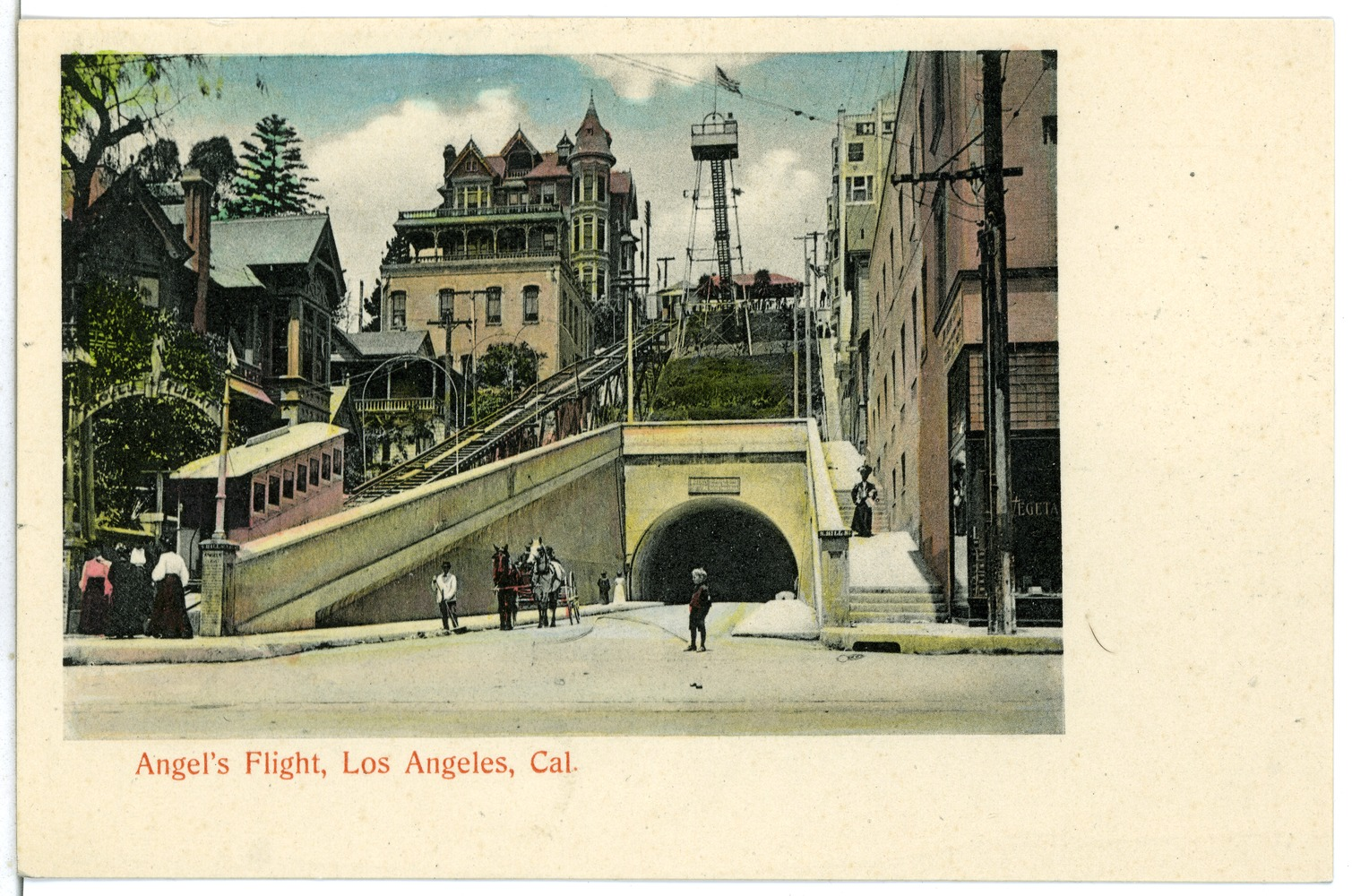
3rd Street Tunnel with original Angels Flight

== Notable locations on Third Street ==
From east to west:

- Bradbury Building
- Million Dollar Theater
- St. Vincent Medical Center
- Marlborough School
- Yeshiva Aharon Yaakov-Ohr Eliyahu (formerly Daniel Murphy High School)
- Park La Brea
- Farmers Market and The Grove
- Writers Guild of America, West
- Joan's on Third
- Beverly Center
- Cedars-Sinai Medical Center
- Little Bangladesh

== Education and transportation ==
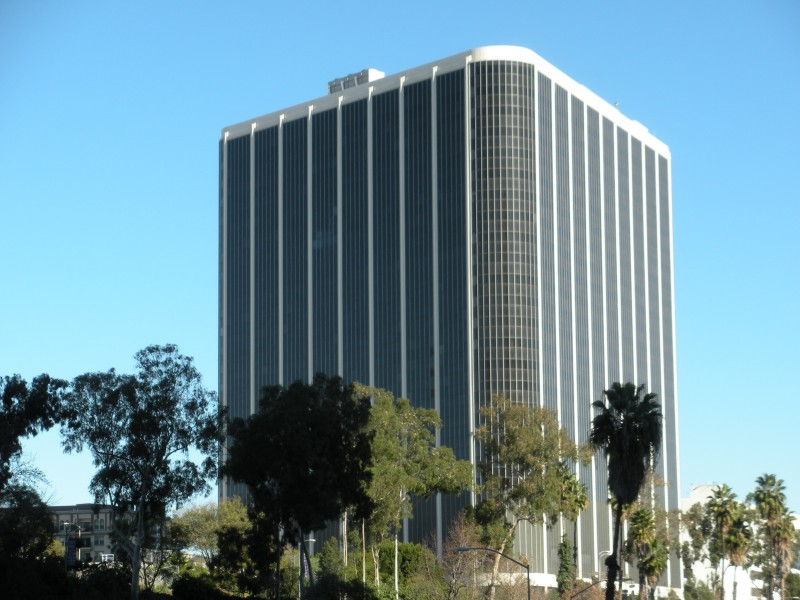
Headquarters building of LAUSD in Downtown Los Angeles

- Los Angeles Board of Education Headquarters
- Evelyn Thurman Gratts Elementary School, 3rd Street and Lucas Avenue
- Miguel Contreras Learning Complex, 3rd Street and Lucas Avenue
- Metro Local bus line 16 serves west 3rd Street. Montebello Transit line 40 serves east 3rd Street.

The Metro E Line runs on 3rd Street between Indiana Street and Atlantic Boulevard, with station stops at Indiana, Maravilla, East LA Civic Center, and Atlantic.
