= 3rd Street Tunnel =

3rd Street Tunnel may refer to:

- 3rd Street Tunnel (Los Angeles)
- 3rd Street Tunnel (District of Columbia), part of the route of Interstate 395 (Virginia–District of Columbia)
