= Xavier Montelongo =

American boxer

Personal information
- Nickname: The Mongoose
- Nationality: Mexican American
- Born: Xavier Montelongo Jr; February 26, 1992 (age 34) East Los Angeles, California
- Height: 5 ft 6 in (168 cm)
- Weight: Featherweight

Boxing career
- Reach: 71 in (180 cm)
- Stance: Orthodox

Boxing record
- Total fights: 15
- Wins: 9
- Win by KO: 2
- Losses: 5
- Draws: 1
- No contests: 0

Xavier Montelongo (born February 26, 1992, in East Los Angeles, California) Mexican American professional boxer in the Featherweight division.

== Amateur career ==
Montelongo had over 200 bouts, with 40 amateur titles and 20 national titles. Xavier even holds an amateur win over undefeated Light Middleweight prospect Bobby Lynn Bryant at the 2008 National Jr. Golden Gloves Championships finals.

== Professional career ==
In October 2011, Montelongo beat José García to win his professional debut. This bout was held at the Club Nokia in Los Angeles, California.

http://www.thesweetscience.com/news/articles/20984-east-las-xavier-montelongo-wins-california-state-title

In June 2015 Montelongo wins the vacant U.S.A. California State Featherweight Title

http://boxrec.com/title/USCA?division=Featherweight
