= E Line (Los Angeles Metro) =

Light rail line in Los Angeles County, California

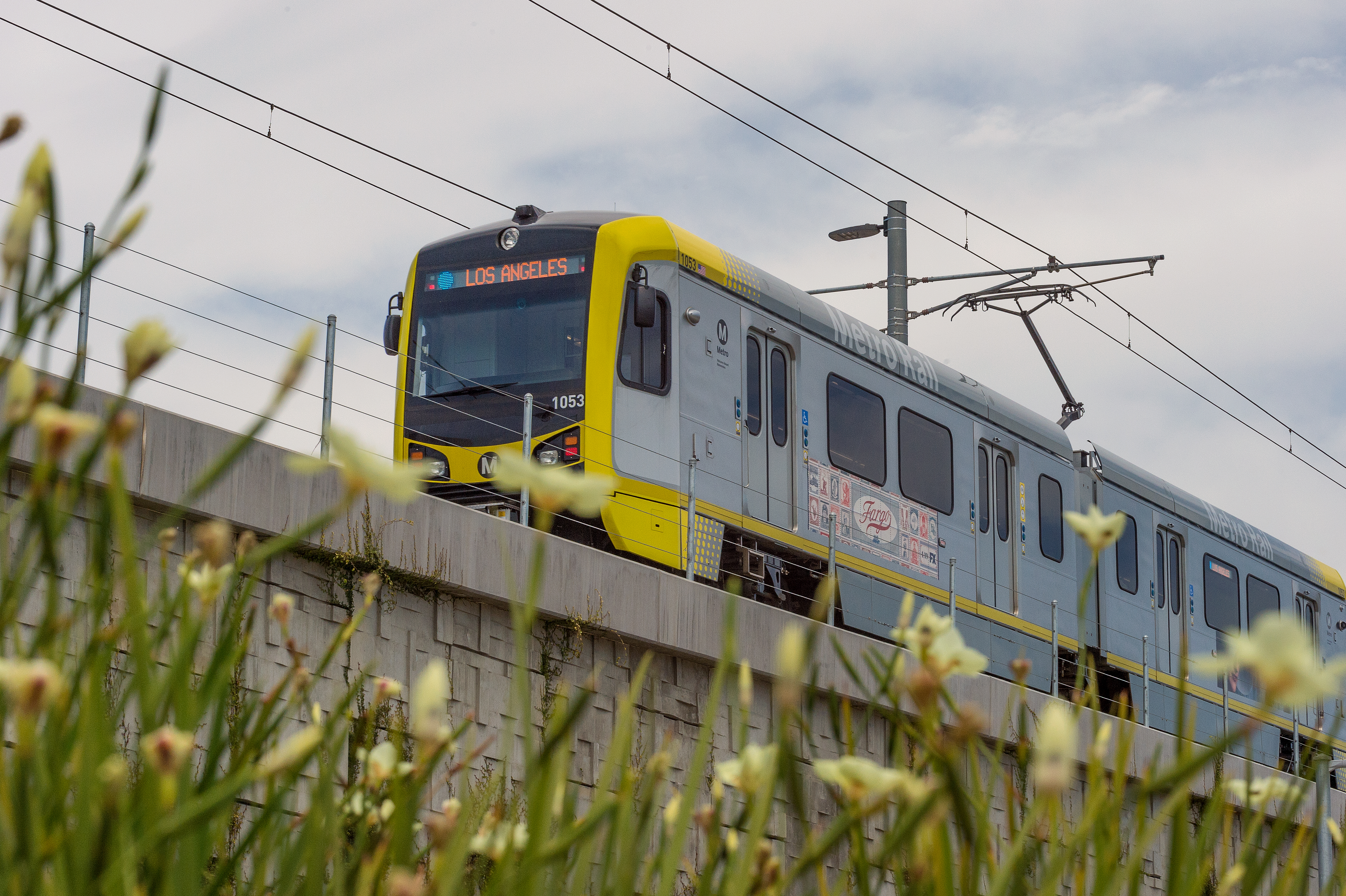
- An LA Metro Kinki Sharyo P3010 train in service on the E Line, 2017

Overview
- Other name(s): Expo Line (2012–2019); Gold Line/L Line (east of Little Tokyo/Arts District)
- Owner: Los Angeles Metro
- Line number: 804 (formerly 806)
- Termini: Downtown Santa Monica; Atlantic
- Stations: 29
- Website: metro.net/riding/guide/e-line

Service
- Type: Light rail
- System: Los Angeles Metro Rail
- Depot(s): Division 14 (Santa Monica); Division 21 (Elysian Park)
- Rolling stock: Kinki Sharyo P3010 running in 2 or 3 car consists
- Daily ridership: 54,006 (weekday, March 2026) ▲
- Ridership: 16,843,619 (2025) ▲6.6%

History
- Opened: April 28, 2012; 14 years ago

Technical
- Line length: 21.9 mi (35.2 km)
- Num of tracks: 2
- Character: Mostly at-grade in private right of way, with some underground, street-running, elevated, and trench sections
- Track gauge: 4 ft 8 1/2 in (1,435 mm) standard gauge
- Electrification: Overhead line, 750 V DC
- Operating speed: 55 mph (89 km/h) (max.); 19.6 mph (31.5 km/h) (avg.)
Route map
E Line marked in black

The E Line (formerly the Expo Line from 2012 to 2019) is a 21.9-mile (35.2 km) light rail line in Los Angeles County, California. It is one of the six lines of the Los Angeles Metro Rail system, operated by Los Angeles Metro. The E Line runs east–west and serves 29 stations between East Los Angeles and Santa Monica, interlining and sharing five stations with the A Line in Downtown Los Angeles. The line operates for 19 hours per day with headways as short as 8 minutes during peak hours. It is the second-busiest light rail line in the system, carrying more than 12 million total passengers in 2023.

The majority of the E Line's western section from Downtown Los Angeles to Santa Monica follows the original right of way of the Los Angeles and Independence Railroad steam railroad, built in 1875. Regular train service ended in 1988, and Metro acquired the right of way in the 1990s. Formal studies to convert the corridor into light rail began in 2000, and construction began in 2006. The E Line from Downtown Los Angeles to Culver City opened in 2012 and was extended to Santa Monica in 2016. Originally named the Expo Line due to its route along Exposition Boulevard, the line was renamed the E Line in late 2019 while retaining the aqua-colored line and icons designating it for the Expo Line.

Following the completion of the Regional Connector Transit Project in June 2023, the E Line extended east to East Los Angeles using part of the L Line light rail line. The project connected the existing E Line to the L Line via a newly built tunnel through Downtown Los Angeles. With this change, L Line service ended and was replaced with the E Line from Little Tokyo/Arts District station to Atlantic station. The line's color designation changed from aqua to gold to reflect its expanded route and integration with the L Line tracks and to also differentiate from the blue of the A Line.

== Service description ==
=== Hours and frequency ===
E Line service hours are from approximately 4:30 a.m. and 11:45 p.m daily. Trains operate every 8 minutes during peak hours, Monday to Friday. Trains run every 10 minutes, during midday on weekdays and weekends, from 9:00 a.m. to 7:00 p.m. Night and early morning service is approximately every 20 minutes every day.

Time	4a	5a	6–7a	8a	9a–1p	2–6p	7p	8p–12a
Weekdays	20		8		10	8	10	20
Weekends/Holidays	20		12–20	10			10–15	20

=== Speed ===
Short segments of the E Line are certified for speeds of up to 55 miles per hour (89 km/h), but service speeds are much slower. All trips on the 22-mile (35 km) line are scheduled at 67 minutes end-to-end, an average speed of 19.6 miles per hour (31.5 km/h).

The E Line has drawn criticism for its slow speed, especially on the Downtown LA and South LA portions of its western segment. To improve reliability, the Los Angeles Department of Transportation (LADOT) continues to work with Metro to adjust traffic signals on Exposition Boulevard in favor of trains, and proposals have been made to reconstruct the junction of the A Line and E Line to speed up trains.

=== Station listing ===
The following is the complete list of stations, from west to east:

Station	Date Opened	City/Neighborhood	Character	Major Connections and Notes
Downtown Santa Monica	May 20, 2016	Santa Monica	At Grade	
17th Street/SMC	May 20, 2016	Santa Monica	At Grade	Park and ride: 65 spaces
26th Street/Bergamot	May 20, 2016	Santa Monica	At Grade	
Expo/Bundy	May 20, 2016	Los Angeles (West Los Angeles)	Elevated	Park and ride: 217 spaces
Expo/Sepulveda	May 20, 2016	Los Angeles (West Los Angeles)	Elevated	Future connection to the Sepulveda Transit Corridor; Park and ride: 260 spaces
Westwood/Rancho Park	May 20, 2016	Los Angeles (Rancho Park)	At Grade	
Palms	May 20, 2016	Los Angeles (Palms)	Elevated	
Culver City	June 20, 2012	Culver City	Elevated	Park and ride: 300 spaces
La Cienega/Jefferson	April 28, 2012	Los Angeles (West Adams)	Elevated	Park and ride: 494 spaces
Expo/La Brea	April 28, 2012	Los Angeles (West Adams)	Elevated	
Farmdale	June 20, 2012	Los Angeles (West Adams)	At Grade	
Expo/Crenshaw	April 28, 2012	Los Angeles (Jefferson Park)	At Grade	Park and ride: 450 spaces (closed Sundays)
Expo/Western	April 28, 2012	Los Angeles (Exposition Park)	At Grade	
Expo/Vermont	April 28, 2012	Los Angeles (Exposition Park)	At Grade	
Expo Park/USC	April 28, 2012	Los Angeles (University Park)	At Grade	
Jefferson/USC	April 28, 2012	Los Angeles (University Park)	At Grade	
LATTC/Ortho Institute	April 28, 2012	Los Angeles (North University Park)	At Grade	J Line
Pico	July 14, 1990	Los Angeles (Downtown)	At Grade	Silver Streak
7th Street/Metro Center	February 15, 1991	Los Angeles (Downtown)	Underground	Silver Streak
Grand Avenue Arts/Bunker Hill	June 16, 2023	Los Angeles (Downtown)	Underground	Silver Streak
Historic Broadway	June 16, 2023	Los Angeles (Downtown)	Underground	Silver Streak
Little Tokyo/Arts District	November 15, 2009	Los Angeles (Little Tokyo/Arts District)	Underground	A Line
Pico/Aliso	November 15, 2009	Los Angeles (Boyle Heights)	At Grade	
Mariachi Plaza	November 15, 2009	Los Angeles (Boyle Heights)	Underground	
Soto	November 15, 2009	Los Angeles (Boyle Heights)	Underground	
Indiana	November 15, 2009	Los Angeles (Boyle Heights)	At Grade	Park and ride: 42 spaces
Maravilla	November 15, 2009	East Los Angeles	At Grade	
East LA Civic Center	November 15, 2009	East Los Angeles	At Grade	
Atlantic	November 15, 2009	East Los Angeles	At Grade	Park and ride: 289 spaces

=== Ridership ===
The E Line had an annual ridership of 15,806,032 in 2024 and averaged 48,913 weekday riders that May. In 2012, the line averaged 19,092 weekday riders when the line opened from Downtown Los Angeles to Culver City. Its ridership increased gradually over the next four years, with an average of 33,264 weekday riders in 2015. When the E Line was extended to Santa Monica in May 2016, ridership rose, carrying an average of 54,073 weekday riders that December. Weekend ridership also increased from an average of 11,000 riders in 2012 to around 30,000 in 2016. The E Line's average weekday ridership peaked at 61,024 in 2018; it began to fall in 2019 due to service reductions and the COVID-19 pandemic, with a low of 24,930 average weekday riders in 2020.

Annual ridership
Year	Ridership	%±
2012	4,141,440	—
2013	8,659,229	+109.1%
2014	9,818,027	+13.4%
2015	9,834,541	+0.2%
2016	13,376,428	+36.0%
2017	19,030,229	+42.3%
2018	19,413,884	+2.0%
2019	18,269,068	−5.9%
2020	8,308,144	−54.5%
2021	7,939,241	−4.4%
2022	11,004,310	+38.6%
2023	12,831,640	+16.6%
2024	15,806,032	+23.2%
2025	16,843,619	+6.6%
Source: Metro

== History ==
=== Gold Line Eastside Extension ===
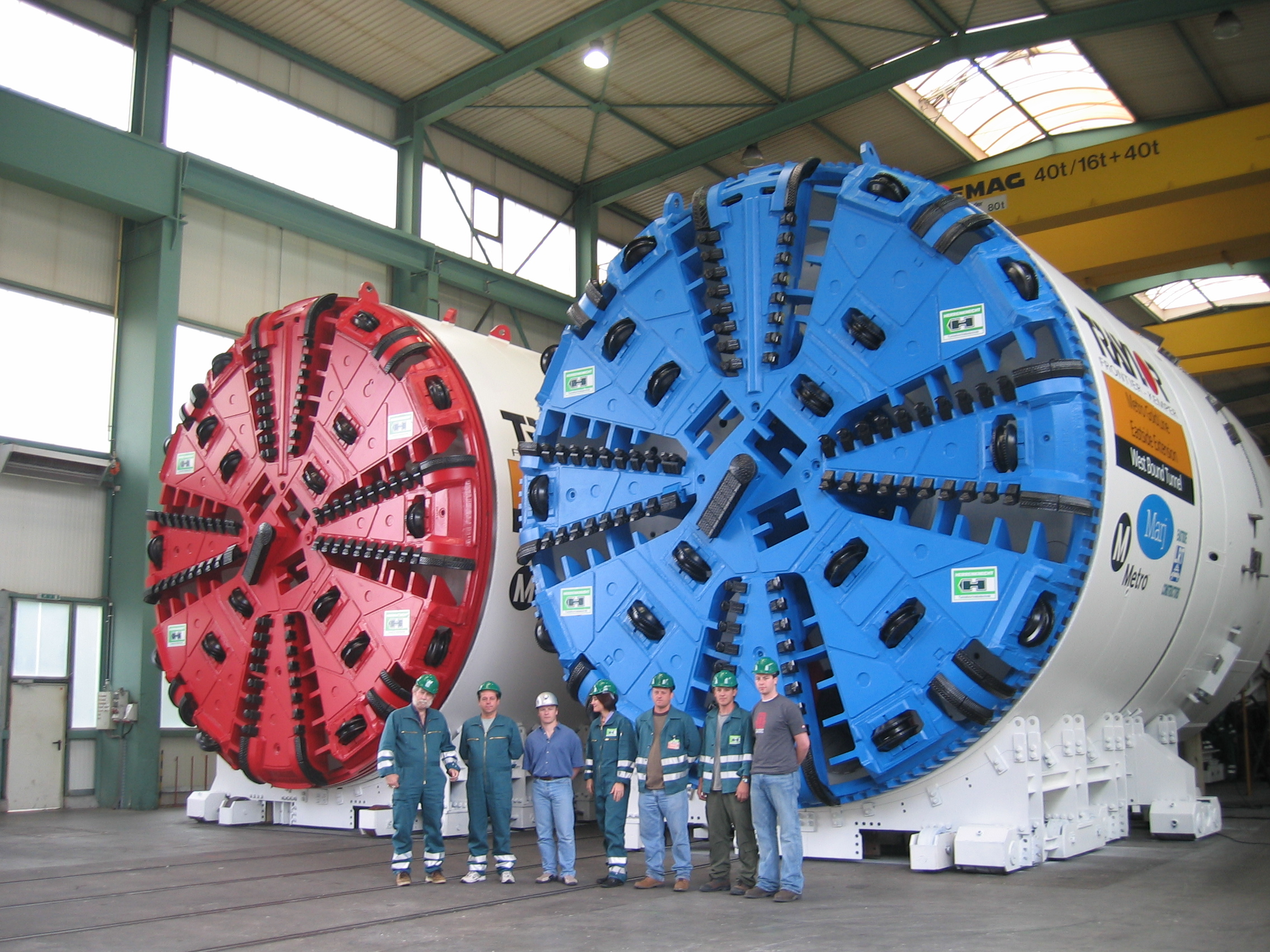
Tunnel boring machine used to dig two subway stations on the LA Metro Gold Line Eastside Extension, now part of the E Line.

The oldest portion of today's E Line was originally the southern branch of the former Gold Line, built as the Gold Line Eastside Extension and the first phase of the Eastside Transit Corridor. This segment runs from Union Station east to Atlantic station in East Los Angeles, in a new right-of-way following along the medians of 1st Street and 3rd Street, along with a short tunneled section under 1st Street.

Construction on the extension began in 2004 and service started on November 15, 2009, with Gold Line trains running from East LA through Union Station, then northeast to Pasadena along the pre-existing Gold Line alignment. This service was in effect through 2020, extending to Azusa in 2016. The Gold Line was renamed the L Line in 2020 and split into two segments to prepare for construction of the Regional Connector. The Eastside Extension portion of the L Line (east of Pico/Aliso station) then operated as an independent line until 2023, when it was merged into the E Line.

=== Air Line becomes the Expo Line ===
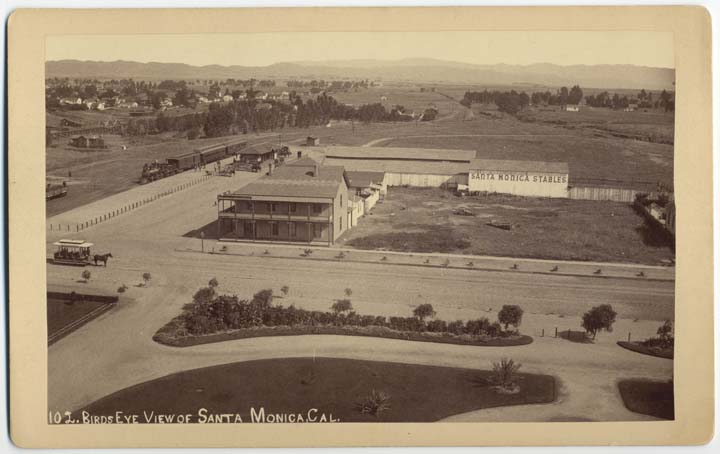
Steam train and horsecar in Santa Monica, 1894

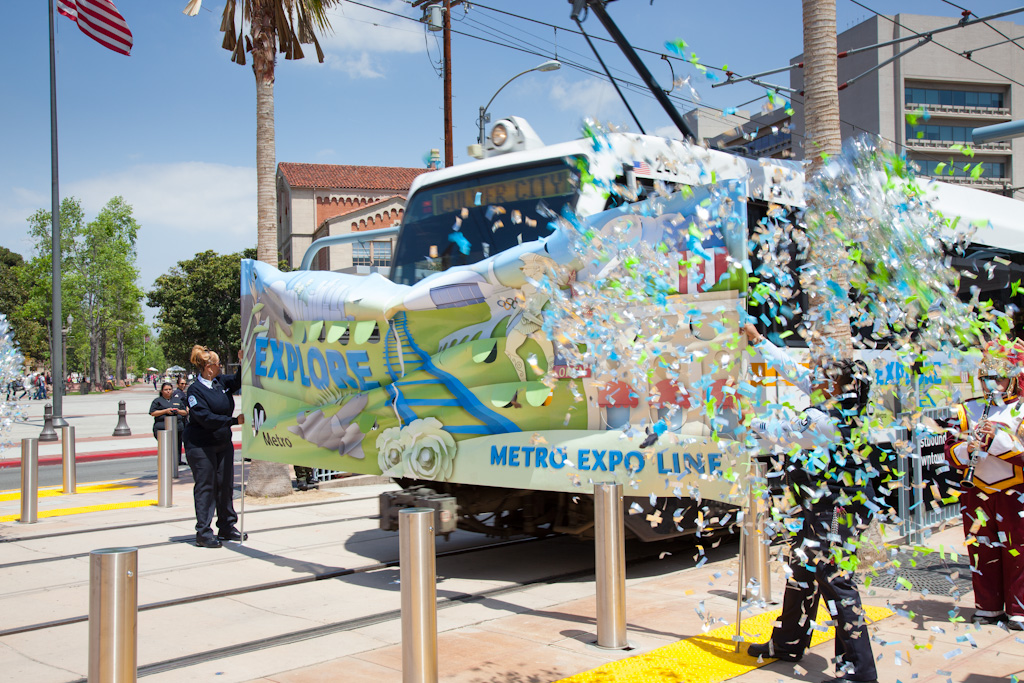
April 2012 opening weekend celebration of the initial operating segment of the Expo Line (now E Line)

The E Line's western section largely follows the right of way used by the Los Angeles and Independence Railroad steam railroad, built in 1875. The Pacific Electric company converted it to electric traction. It operated the line as the Santa Monica Air Line by 1920, with both freight and passenger services. Passenger service ended in 1953, and freight service stopped in 1988.

Local advocacy groups, including Friends 4 Expo Transit supported the successful passage of Proposition C in 1990, which allowed the purchase of the entire right of way from Southern Pacific by Metro. In 2000, an urban art group called Heavy Trash placed signs advertising a fictional "Aqua Line." The signs, with the text "Coming Soon," showed a subway route extending along Wilshire Boulevard to the Pacific Ocean, with ten stations. Although the campaign was a hoax, it demonstrated newfound support and revealed the frustrations surrounding the lack of rail service connecting Santa Monica and the Westside with Downtown Los Angeles. Metro released a Major Investment Study in 2000 which compared bus rapid transit and light rail transit options along what was later known as the "Mid-City/Exposition Corridor."

A joint powers authority, the Exposition Metro Line Construction Authority, was formed by the California State Legislature in 2003 to plan, design, and construct the line. The authority was governed by appointees from Metro, Los Angeles County, and the cities of Los Angeles, Santa Monica, and Culver City. After construction of the second phase was completed, the line was handed over on January 15, 2016, to Los Angeles Metro.

The line was built in two phases; the first phase comprised the 8.6-mile (13.8 km) section between 7th Street/Metro Center station in Downtown Los Angeles and Culver City. Construction began in early 2006, and most stations opened to the public on April 28, 2012. Culver City station opened on June 20, 2012, in conjunction with the infill Farmdale station between Expo/La Brea station and Expo/Crenshaw station.

Construction on the 6.6-mile (10.6 km) portion between Culver City and Santa Monica started in September 2011. Testing along the Phase 2 segment began on April 6, 2015, and the segment opened on May 20, 2016.

In 2019, Metro began a process where all Metro Rail and Busway lines would be identified by a letter name rather than the previous system of colors. As a result, the Expo Line became the E Line in 2019, and retained the aqua color until the opening of the Regional Connector Transit Project.

=== Regional Connector ===
The alignment of the Regional Connector Transit Project

The Regional Connector Transit Project constructed a 1.9-mile (3.1 km) light rail tunnel through Downtown Los Angeles that connected the preexisting A and E Lines to the former L Line to allow for a seamless one-seat ride between the A and E lines' previous terminus at 7th Street/Metro Center station to Union Station and the Eastside. Two new stations were also constructed in the tunnel, providing more service to destinations and communities in Downtown Los Angeles.

Formal studies and planning for the Regional Connector began in 2004 and was approved in 2012. A groundbreaking ceremony was held on September 30, 2014, marking the start of major construction. To accommodate the new tunnel, the existing at-grade L Line Little Tokyo/Arts District station was demolished in 2020 and rebuilt as a subway station approximately 500 feet (150 m) south and on the opposite side of Alameda Street from its former location. Starting on April 9, 2023, the A, E, and L Line trains ran through the Regional Connector tunnel for final testing. The project officially opened for revenue service on June 16, 2023.

Once the Regional Connector was completed, the alignment of the L Line was split into two parts at Little Tokyo/Arts District station, with the portion north of the station joined to the A Line, extending it to connect Long Beach with Azusa. The alignment east of Little Tokyo/Arts District station was assigned to the E Line, extending it to connect Santa Monica and East Los Angeles directly. The new east–west line uses the E Line name originally assigned to the Expo Line but uses the former L Line's gold color, with the L Line name going out of use.

== Future developments ==
=== Eastside Transit Corridor ===
The Eastside Transit Corridor is a project to extend the line in two phases from its eastern terminus at Atlantic station to Lambert station in Whittier. Partially funded by Measure M, construction is programmed to start in 2029 with service beginning in 2035, though the project maybe accelerated through the Twenty-eight by '28 initiative as a part of Metro's plans to prepare for the upcoming 2028 Summer Olympics.

== Operations ==
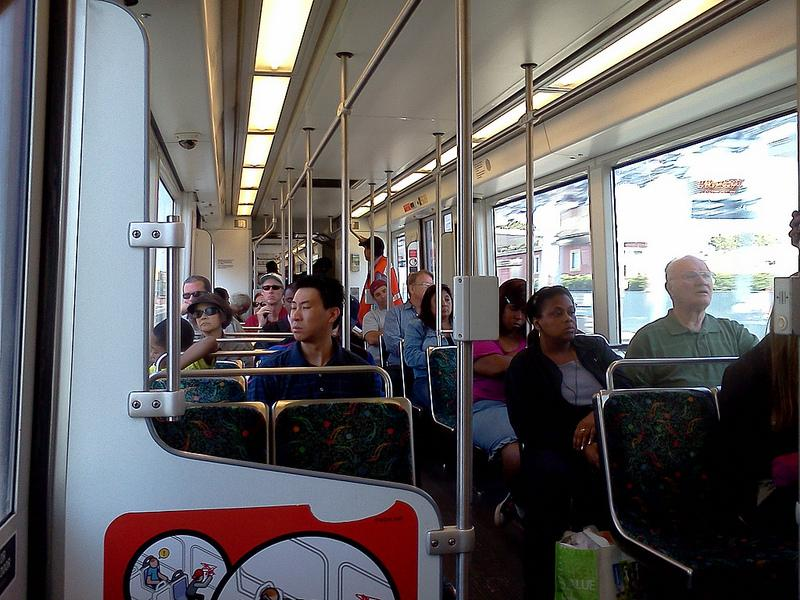
Interior of a westbound train, first day of operation to Culver City

On Metro Rail's internal timetables, the E Line is called line 804. Before the opening of the Regional Connector, it was line 806.

=== Maintenance facilities ===
The E Line is operated out of two divisions, Metro's term for transit maintenance and storage facilities.

Division 14 is located east of Stewart Street and north of Exposition Boulevard in Santa Monica between 26th Street/Bergamot and Expo/Bundy stations. The facility opened in 2016 with the completion of Phase 2.

Division 21 is located at 1800 Baker Street between Elysian Park and the Los Angeles River in Chinatown between Lincoln/Cypress and Chinatown stations on the A Line. The facility opened in 2003 for the first phase of the Gold Line.

=== Rolling stock ===
The E Line operates trains with three cars on weekdays and two on weekends, except for weekend days with major events in Expo Park. The line currently uses one type of light rail vehicle; the Kinki Sharyo P3010.

Metro says that it takes 47 light rail vehicles to provide the maximum service on the E Line with 3-car trains running at 6-minute headways.

== Bike pathways ==
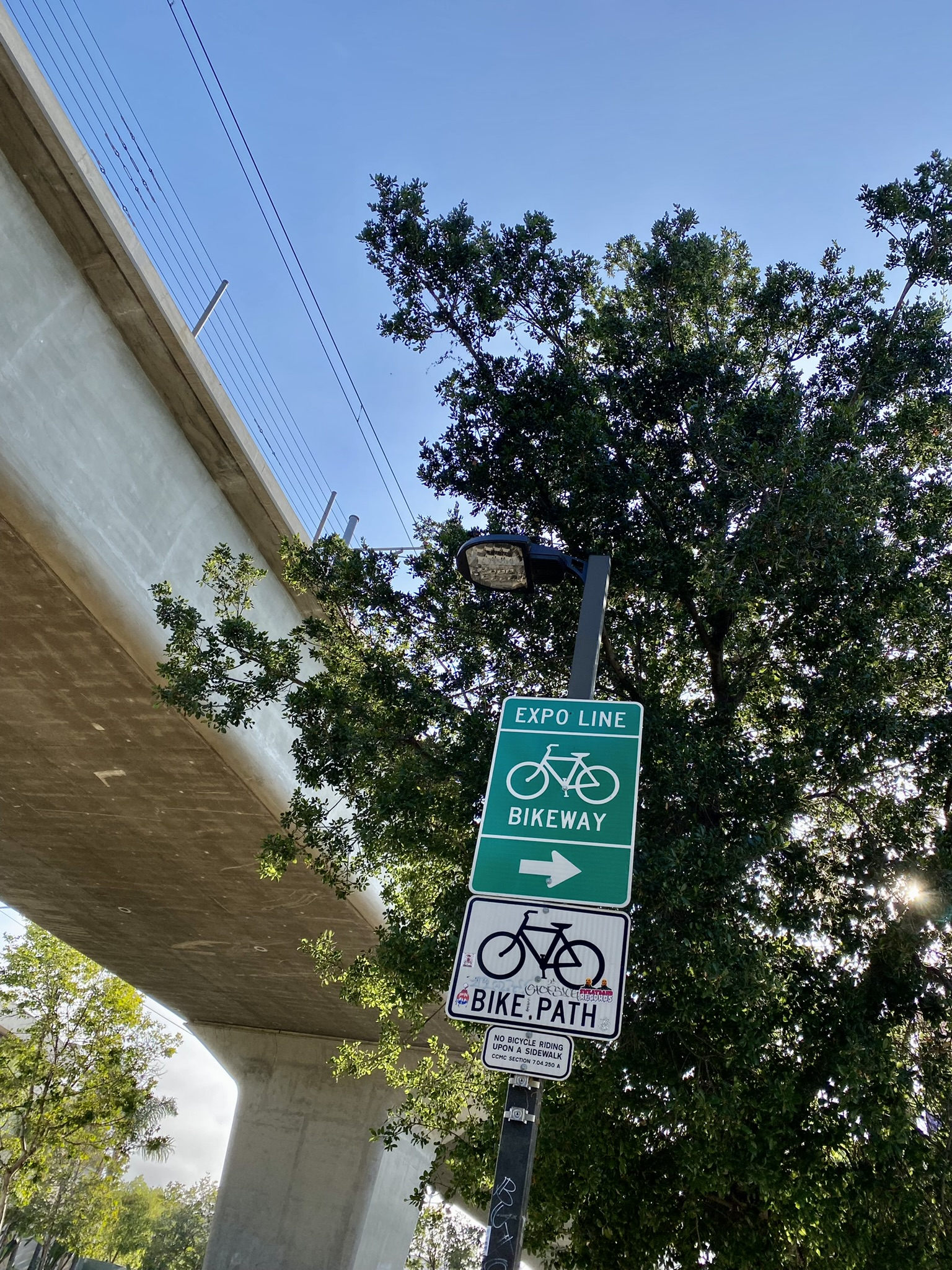
Bikeway directional sign under elevated track

The Expo Bike Path parallels the route of the light rail line between 17th Street/SMC and Expo/Vermont stations. The bikeway includes a mixture of bike lanes on Exposition Boulevard and off-street paths alongside the rail tracks.

== Incidents ==
The list below pertains to the original E Line between Downtown Los Angeles and Santa Monica until 2023.

- March 28, 2015 – a light rail train collided with a silver Hyundai Sonata at Exposition Boulevard and Vermont Avenue before a sold-out soccer match at the Los Angeles Memorial Coliseum.
- November 29, 2018 – a pedestrian was struck and killed. The man had been attempting to cross the tracks.
- January 15, 2019 – a passenger fell from the platform between the cars and was dragged to death. They "have not yet been able to identify the individual as pieces of the victim's body are spread out."
- May 2, 2019 – a man climbed a nearby construction crane and jumped to his death at Expo/Sepulveda station, landing on the tracks and temporarily halting transportation. Graphic footage of the incident was spread on social media websites, most notably Reddit.
- September 18, 2024 – a car was struck, as well as a Kinki Sharyo P3010 train being derailed in the same incident in East Los Angeles.
