= Atlantic station (Los Angeles Metro) =

Light rail station in East Los Angeles, California

Atlantic
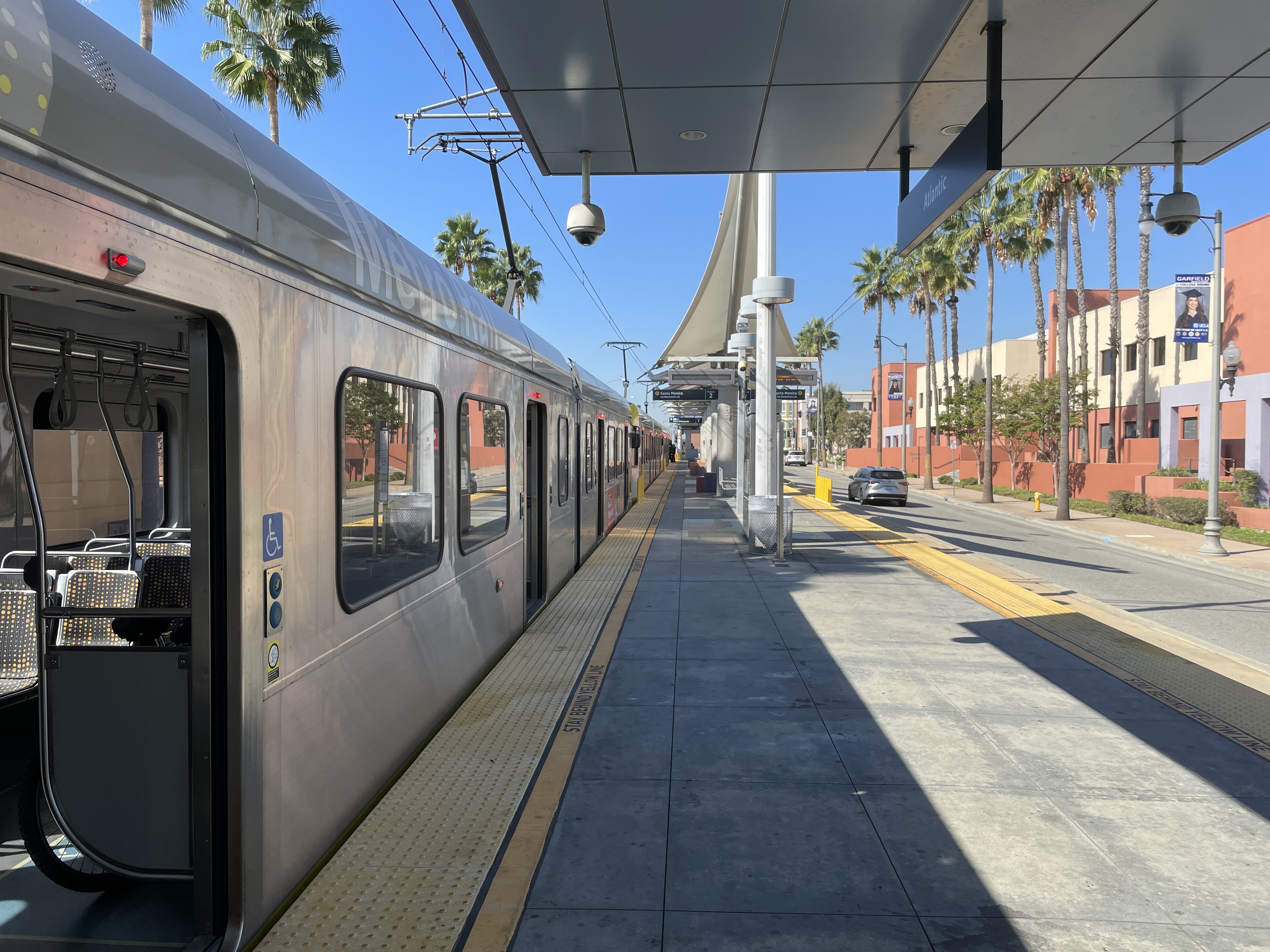
- Atlantic station platform, currently the eastern terminus of the E Line

General information
- Location: 5150 East Pomona Boulevard; East Los Angeles, California
- Coordinates: 34.0334°N 118.1540°W
- Owner: Los Angeles County Metropolitan Transportation Authority
- Platforms: 1 island platform
- Tracks: 2
- Connections: El Sol; Los Angeles Metro Bus; Montebello Bus Lines

Construction
- Structure type: At-grade
- Parking: 289 spaces
- Cycle facilities: Racks and lockers
- Accessible: Yes

History
- Opened: November 15, 2009

Passengers
- FY 2025: 2,008 (avg. wkdy boardings)

Services
| Preceding station | Metro Rail | Following station |
|---|---|---|
| East LA Civic Center toward Santa Monica | E Line | Terminus |
Former services
| Preceding station | Metro Rail | Following station |
|---|---|---|
| Terminus | L Line | East LA Civic Center toward Azusa |
Former services (at UP station)
| Preceding station | Union Pacific Railroad | Following station |
|---|---|---|
| Los Angeles Terminus | Los Angeles and Salt Lake Railroad | Pico toward Salt Lake City |
| Terminus | East Los Angeles – Anaheim | La Habra toward Anaheim |
Location

Atlantic station is an at grade light rail station on the E Line of the Los Angeles Metro Rail system. It is located at the intersection of Atlantic and Pomona Boulevards in East Los Angeles.

This station opened on November 15, 2009, as part of the Gold Line Eastside Extension and currently serves as the eastern terminus of the E Line. The station is expected to be relocated to accommodate service for the Eastside Transit Corridor Phase 2 by 2035.

A 268-space parking structure for this station opened on April 22, 2010, joining a 21-space parking lot.

== Service ==
=== Station layout ===
Atlantic station utilizes a simple island platform setup with two tracks in the median of East 3rd Street. There are two ramps for platform access, one at the intersection of South Atlantic Boulevard, leading to the station's park and ride garage, and the other at the junction of East Beverly Boulevard and South Woods Avenue.

=== Hours and frequency ===
E Line service hours are from approximately 4:30 a.m. and 11:45 p.m daily. Trains operate every 8 minutes during peak hours, Monday to Friday. Trains run every 10 minutes, during midday on weekdays and weekends, from 9:00 a.m. to 7:00 p.m. Night and early morning service is approximately every 20 minutes every day.

=== Connections ===
As of December 15, 2024, the following connections are available:

- El Sol: City Terrace/East Los Angeles College, Whittier Boulevard/Saybrook Park
- Los Angeles Metro Bus: 106, 260, 261
- Montebello Bus Lines: 10, 40, Express 90

== Future ==
As part of plans for the future planned Eastside Transit Corridor Phase 2 project, Metro plans to replace the existing at-grade station with a shallow open-air underground station with two side platforms and a canopy. The new station would be located on the south side of the current station, underneath the current triangular parcel of land bound by Atlantic Boulevard, Pomona Boulevard, and Beverly Boulevard. The current parking structure to the northeast of the current station will continue to serve the new station, and the artwork at the current station will be relocated to the new station.
