= East Los Angeles, California =

Unincorporated community in California, United States

- Unincorporated community Census designated place
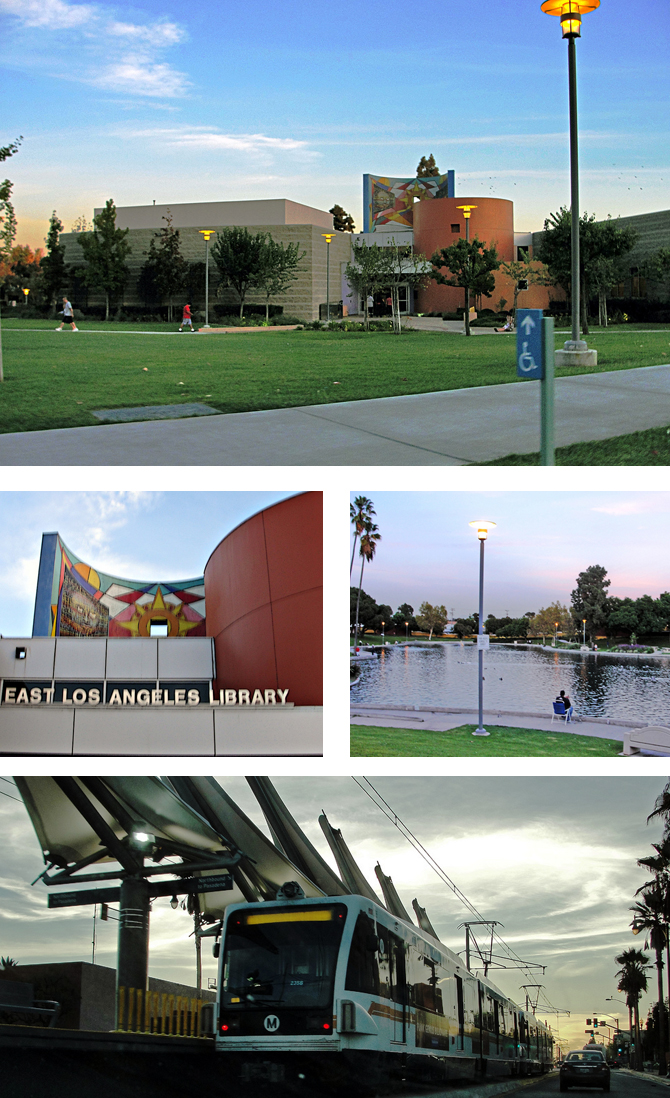
- Images, from top and left to right: East LA Public Library, Civic Center Park, Atlantic E Line Station
- Interactive map of East Los Angeles, California
- Location within Los Angeles Location within the Los Angeles metropolitan area Location within California Location within the United States
- Coordinates: 34°2′N 118°10′W
- Country: United States
- State: California
- County: Los Angeles

Area
  - Total: 7.46 sq mi (19.31 km^{2})
  - Land: 7.45 sq mi (19.30 km^{2})
  - Water: 0.0039 sq mi (0.01 km^{2}) 0.06%
- Elevation: 200 ft (61 m)

Population (2020)
  - Total: 118,786
  - Density: 15,937.7/sq mi (6,153.58/km^{2})
- Time zone: UTC-8 (PST)
  - Summer (DST): UTC-7 (PDT)
- ZIP code: 90022, 90063
- Area codes: 213 and 323
- FIPS code: 06-20802
- GNIS feature ID: 1660583

East Los Angeles, or East L.A., (El Este de Los Angeles in Spanish) is an unincorporated community on the Eastside of Los Angeles County, California, United States. It borders Monterey Park to the northeast; the City of Los Angeles to the north, west, and a small portion to the south. Commerce to the south, and Montebello to the southeast. California State Route 60 and Interstate 710 intersect through the community. According to the United States Census Bureau, East Los Angeles is designated as a census-designated place (CDP) for statistical purposes. The most recent data from the 2020 census reports a population of 118,786, reflecting a 6.1% decrease compared to the 2010 population of 126,496.

The concentration of Hispanic/Latino Americans is 95.16 percent, the highest of any large city or census-designated place in the United States outside of Puerto Rico.

== History ==
=== Original East Los Angeles ===
Historically, when it was founded in 1873, the neighborhood northeast of downtown was originally named East Los Angeles, but in 1917, residents voted to change the name to its current name, Lincoln Heights. Today, it is considered part of Eastside Los Angeles, the geographic region east of the Los Angeles River that includes three neighborhoods within the city of Los Angeles (Boyle Heights, El Sereno, and Lincoln Heights) and the unincorporated community in Los Angeles County known today as "East Los Angeles". Lincoln Heights is 4 miles (6 km) northwest of present-day East Los Angeles. When Lincoln Heights, the first Eastside subdivision created in 1873, changed its name in 1917, Belvedere (Belvedere Gardens and Belvedere Heights) and surrounding unincorporated county areas were given the moniker of East Los Angeles. By the 1930s, most maps had started to label the Belvedere area as "East Los Angeles".

=== Belvedere ===
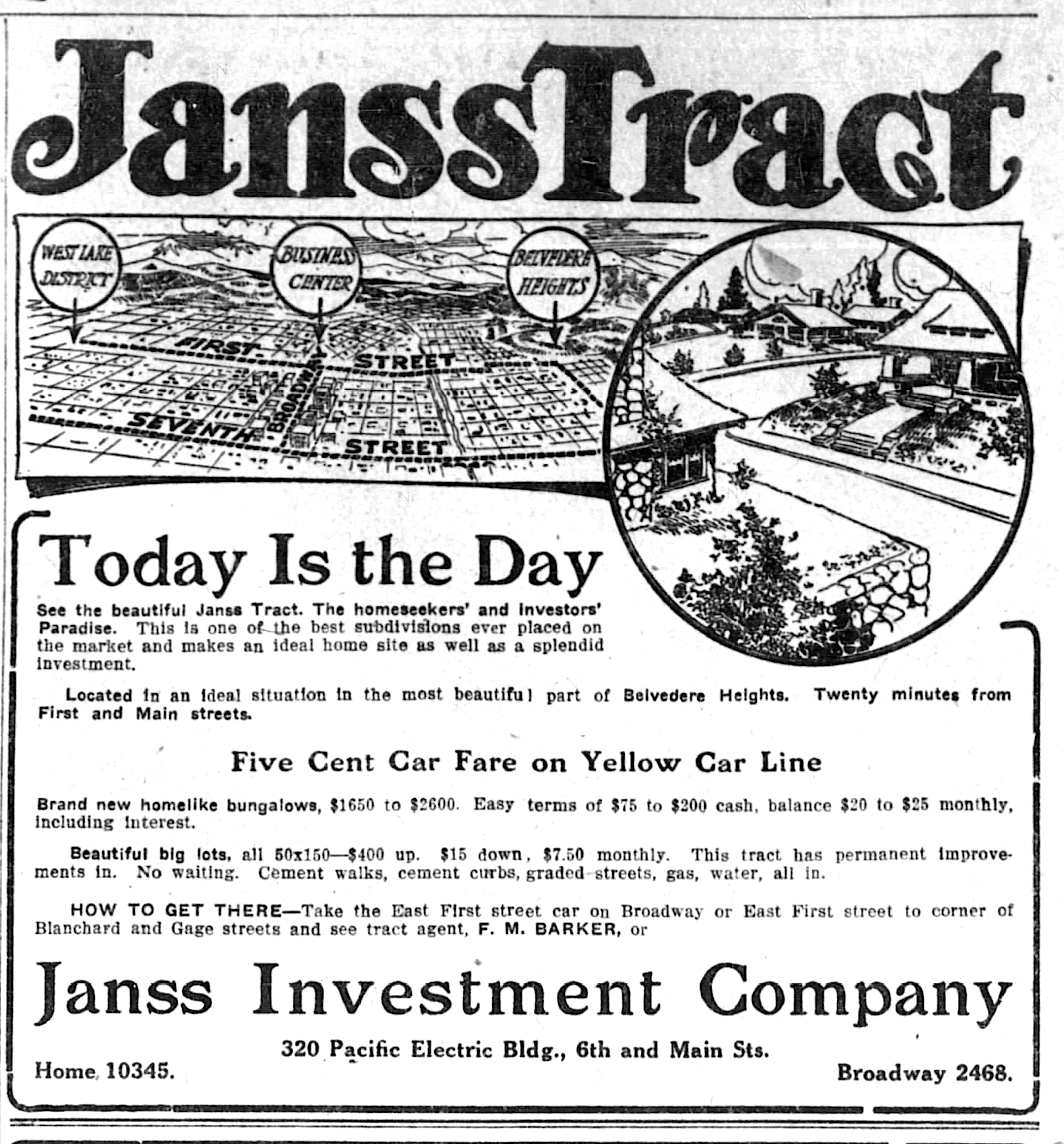
1910 Janss Investment Company ad for Belvedere Heights property sales

The cornerstone of the first building of Occidental College was laid in September 1887 on Rowan Street. In 1896, the building was destroyed by fire.

On April 2, 1905, it was reported that the Janss Investment Company would be developing an area "on Boyle Heights" (later, Boyle Heights would refer only to a smaller area to the west, i.e. the neighborhood now called Boyle Heights within the Los Angeles city limits). The 170-acre (0.69 km^{2}) tract was located at the eastern terminus of the Los Angeles Railway's "R" streetcar line. Originally known as "Hazard's Eastside Extension", it was to be named Highland Villa, but would later be rechristened Belvedere Heights. Belvedere Heights, at its launch in 1905, extended from the L.A. city limits (Indiana Av.) on the west to Rowan Av. on the east, from Aliso St. on the south to Wabash Av. on the north, the northwestern portion of today's East Los Angeles, thus including the lower portions of what today is called City Terrace.

By the early 1920s, workers in the sprouting industrial district to the south were seeking nearby housing. At the time, the unincorporated region was undeveloped and or preserved for agriculture and oil extraction. Belvedere township included the territory that in 1902 became the city of Montebello.

By 1922 Janss advertised that it had sold 6000 lots there and that 35,000 people lived in Belvedere Heights. Buildings that were described as being in Belvedere Heights included the junior high school on Record between Brooklyn and Michigan, now called Belvedere Middle School.

In February 1921 Janss announced that it had purchased 150 acres (61 ha) adjacent to the end of the streetcar line on Stephenson Avenue, now Whittier Boulevard, south of Belvedere Heights, and divided the empty land into housing lots of square-mile grid cells. Janss called the new tract Belvedere Gardens, an area still found today on maps for the area east of the Long Beach Freeway.

The area was able to avoid being annexed into the City of Los Angeles because of a private groundwater utility formed in 1926 now known as the California Water Service, which would later become a customer of the Metropolitan Water District. Prior to the passage of Proposition 13 in 1978, governing bodies would set property taxes independently, which led to a cumulative overlapping rate including bond taxes for large infrastructure projects such as the building of the Port of Los Angeles. However, unincorporated areas were often forced to incorporate or be annexed into these taxing entities in order to obtain critical municipal services such as water from the Los Angeles Aqueduct. For decades, the lack of a city property tax and bond taxes made East Los Angeles a tax haven for the working class.

=== New name: East Los Angeles ===
In 1932, local business leaders gave the name East Los Angeles to Belvedere and adjacent areas (that had been known as Belvedere Gardens, Belvedere Heights, Laguna, etc.) However, in 1937 the Automobile Club of Southern California put up three large signs, "Belvedere Gardens". This led to the business leaders uprooting the signs, with a "burial ceremony" for the signs with 150 state, county, and city officials attending, and they rechristened the area East Los Angeles. Several county buildings were renamed in line with the new appellation. At that time the area had 75,000 residents and was "declared to be the largest unincorporated locality in the world."

East Los Angeles was a significant site during the Chicano Movement, which included the East L.A. Walkouts in 1968 and the National Chicano Moratorium, in which Ruben Salazar was killed.

Multiple campaigns by residents have been made for cityhood for East Los Angeles, such as in 2010.

== Geography ==
East Los Angeles is located immediately east of the Boyle Heights district of Los Angeles, south of the El Sereno district of Los Angeles, north of the city of Commerce, and west of the cities of Monterey Park and Montebello.

The unincorporated area known as City Terrace occupies the northern part of the CDP. The Census Bureau definition of the area may not precisely correspond to the local understanding of the community.

=== Climate ===
East Los Angeles. has a very warm hot-summer Mediterranean climate.

Climate data for East Los Angeles, California (1981–2010 normals)
Month	Jan	Feb	Mar	Apr	May	Jun	Jul	Aug	Sep	Oct	Nov	Dec	Year
Mean daily maximum °F (°C)	73 (23)	74 (23)	76 (24)	80 (27)	83 (28)	85 (29)	90 (32)	92 (33)	91 (33)	83 (28)	77 (25)	73 (23)	81 (27)
Mean daily minimum °F (°C)	48 (9)	48 (9)	51 (11)	53 (12)	57 (14)	61 (16)	65 (18)	65 (18)	63 (17)	58 (14)	52 (11)	47 (8)	56 (13)
Average precipitation inches (mm)	3.78 (96)	3.53 (90)	2.66 (68)	0.93 (24)	0.33 (8.4)	0.06 (1.5)	0.01 (0.25)	0.03 (0.76)	0.18 (4.6)	0.30 (7.6)	1.21 (31)	2.43 (62)	16.43 (417)

== Demographics ==
Historical population
Census	Pop.	Note	%±
1960	104,270		—
1970	104,881		0.6%
1980	110,017		4.9%
1990	126,379		14.9%
2000	124,283		−1.7%
2010	126,496		1.8%
2020	118,786		−6.1%
U.S. Decennial Census; 1860–1870 1880-1890; 1900 1910 1920; 1930 1940 1950; 1960 1970 1980; 1990 2000 2010; 2020

East Los Angeles first appeared as an unincorporated place in the 1960 United States census as part of the Southeast census county division; and as a census designated place in the 1980 United States census.

=== Racial and ethnic composition ===
East Los Angeles CDP, California – Racial and ethnic composition Note: the US Census treats Hispanic/Latino as an ethnic category. This table excludes Latinos from the racial categories and assigns them to a separate category. Hispanics/Latinos may be of any race.
Race / Ethnicity (NH = Non-Hispanic)	Pop 1980	Pop 1990	Pop 2000	Pop 2010	Pop 2020	% 1980	% 1990	% 2000	% 2010	% 2020
White alone (NH)	4,559	3,497	2,275	1,917	2,399	4.14%	2.77%	1.83%	1.52%	2.02%
Black or African American alone (NH)	378	1,538	192	322	638	0.34%	1.22%	0.15%	0.25%	0.54%
Native American or Alaska Native alone (NH)	96	118	260	167	199	0.09%	0.09%	0.21%	0.13%	0.17%
Asian alone (NH)	1,199	1,198	838	962	1,648	1.09%	0.95%	0.67%	0.76%	1.39%
Native Hawaiian or Pacific Islander alone (NH)	1,199	1,198	13	13	19	1.09%	0.95%	0.01%	0.01%	0.02%
Other race alone (NH)	271	344	108	153	331	0.24%	0.27%	0.09%	0.12%	0.28%
Mixed race or Multiracial (NH)	x	x	290	178	516	x	x	0.23%	0.14%	0.43%
Hispanic or Latino (any race)	103,514	119,684	120,307	122,784	113,036	94.09%	94.70%	96.80%	97.07%	95.16%
Total	110,017	126,379	124,283	126,496	118,786	100.00%	100.00%	100.00%	100.00%	100.00%

East Los Angeles is the least ethnically diverse community in Los Angeles County, as noted by the Los Angeles Times' "Mapping L.A." survey. Mexican (85.4%) and Italian (0.2%) are the most common ancestries. Mexico and El Salvador were the most common foreign places of birth.

=== 2020 census ===
As of the 2020 census, East Los Angeles had a population of 118,786. The median age was 33.3 years. 25.6% of residents were under the age of 18 and 11.2% of residents were 65 years of age or older. For every 100 females there were 97.2 males, and for every 100 females age 18 and over there were 95.1 males age 18 and over.

100.0% of residents lived in urban areas, while 0.0% lived in rural areas.

There were 31,548 households in East Los Angeles, of which 46.5% had children under the age of 18 living in them. Of all households, 42.8% were married-couple households, 17.5% were households with a male householder and no spouse or partner present, and 30.5% were households with a female householder and no spouse or partner present. About 14.2% of all households were made up of individuals and 6.3% had someone living alone who was 65 years of age or older.

There were 32,589 housing units, of which 3.2% were vacant. The homeowner vacancy rate was 0.5% and the rental vacancy rate was 1.6%.

Racial composition as of the 2020 census
Race	Number	Percent
White	19,984	16.8%
Black or African American	822	0.7%
American Indian and Alaska Native	3,606	3.0%
Asian	1,833	1.5%
Native Hawaiian and Other Pacific Islander	61	0.1%
Some other race	68,372	57.6%
Two or more races	24,108	20.3%
Hispanic or Latino (of any race)	113,036	95.2%

=== 2010 census ===
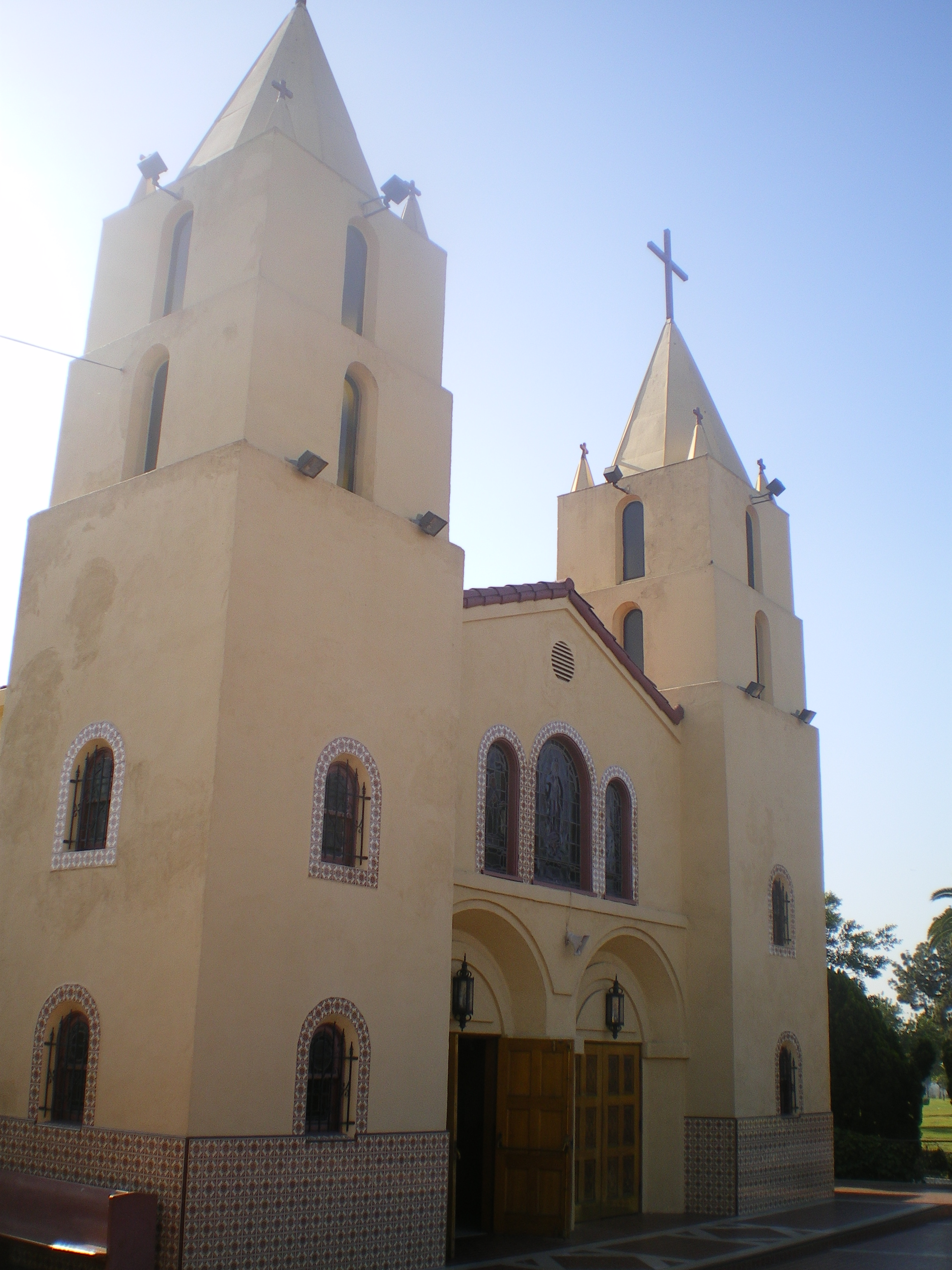
Our Lady of Guadalupe Sanctuary

The 2010 United States census reported that East Los Angeles had a population of 126,496. Population density was 16,973.5 people per square mile (6,553.5 people/km^{2}). The racial makeup of East Los Angeles was 53,934 (50.5%) White (1.5% Non-Hispanic White), 817 (0.6%) African American, 1,549 (1.2%) Native American, 1,144 (0.9%) Asian, 63 (0.0%) Pacific Islander, 54,846 (43.4%) from other races, and 4,143 (4.3%) from two or more races. Hispanic or Latino of any race were 122,784 persons (97.1%).

The Census reported that 126,176 people (99.7% of the population) lived in households, 174 (0.1%) lived in non-institutionalized group quarters, and 146 (0.1%) were institutionalized.

There were 30,816 households, out of which 17,509 (56.8%) had children under the age of 18 living in them, 15,497 (50.3%) were opposite-sex married couples living together, 7,104 (23.1%) had a female householder with no husband present, 3,238 (10.5%) had a male householder with no wife present. There were 2,516 (8.2%) unmarried opposite-sex partnerships, and 199 (0.6%) same-sex married couples or partnerships. 3,781 households (12.3%) were made up of individuals, and 1,781 (5.8%) had someone living alone who was 65 years of age or older. The average household size was 4.09. There were 25,839 families (83.8% of all households); the average family size was 4.33.

The population was spread out, with 39,804 people (31.5%) under the age of 18, 15,193 people (12.0%) aged 18 to 24, 37,354 people (29.5%) aged 25 to 44, 23,281 people (18.4%) aged 45 to 64, and 10,864 people (8.6%) who were 65 years of age or older. The median age was 29.1 years. For every 100 females, there were 98.9 males. For every 100 females age 18 and over, there were 97.1 males.

There were 32,201 housing units at an average density of 4,320.8 units per square mile (1,668.3 units/km^{2}), of which 10,986 (35.7%) were owner-occupied, and 19,830 (64.3%) were occupied by renters. The homeowner vacancy rate was 1.2%; the rental vacancy rate was 3.2%. 47,123 people (37.3% of the population) lived in owner-occupied housing units and 79,053 people (62.5%) lived in rental housing units.

According to the 2010 United States Census, East Los Angeles had a median household income of $37,982, with 26.9% of the population living below the federal poverty line.

=== 2000 census ===
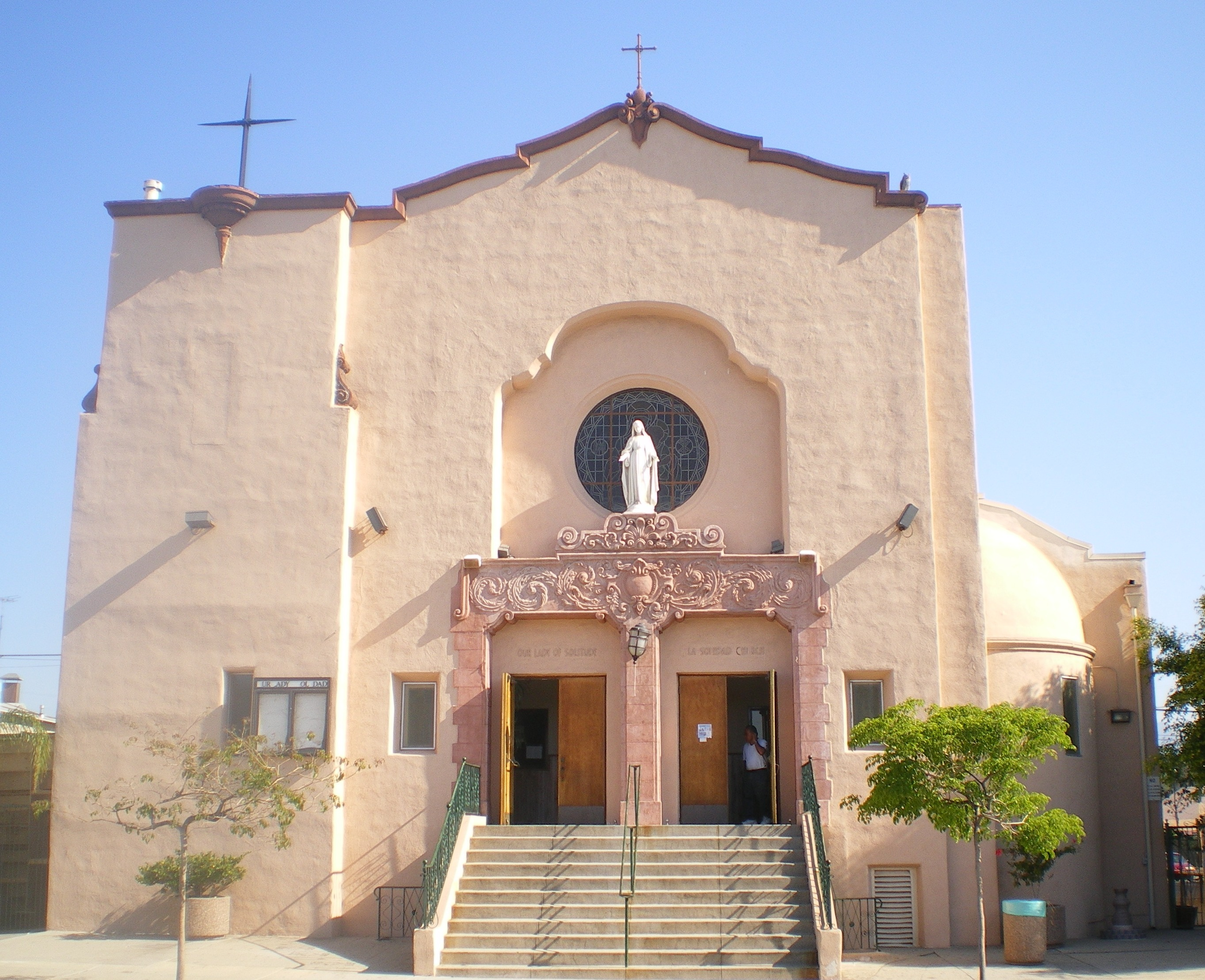
Our Lady of Solitude Church

As of 2000, there were 124,283 people, 29,844 households, and 25,068 families residing in the community. The population density was 16,697.4 inhabitants per square mile (6,446.9/km^{2}). There were 31,096 housing units at an average density of 4,177.8 units per square mile (1,613.1 units/km^{2}). The racial makeup of the community was 39.3% White, 4.52% Black or African American, 1.29% Native American, 0.77% Asian, 0.06% Pacific Islander, 54.01% from other races, and 4.22% from two or more races. 96.8% of the population were Hispanic or Latino.

As of 2000, speakers of Spanish as a first language accounted for 87.30%, while English accounted for 12.65%, Japanese was spoken by 0.16%, Armenian made up 0.09%, Vietnamese was at 0.07%, Chinese at 0.05%, Russian at 0.04%, Tagalog at 0.03%, and Mandarin was at 0.03% of the population.

There were 29,844 households, out of which 51.7% had children under the age of 18 living with them, 53.1% were married couples living together, 21.7% had a female householder with no husband present, and 16.0% were non-families. 12.5% of all households were made up of individuals, and 6.4% had someone living alone who was 65 years of age or older. The average household size was 4.15 and the average family size was 4.42.

The age distribution of the community was as follows: 34.6% under the age of 18, 12.6% from 18 to 24, 30.7% from 25 to 44, 14.2% from 45 to 64, and 7.9% who were 65 years of age or older. The median age was 26 years. For every 100 females, there were 101.6 males. For every 100 females age 18 and over, there were 99.2 males.

The median income for a household in the community was $28,544, and the median income for a family was $29,755. Males had a median income of $21,065 versus $18,475 for females. The per capita income for the community was $9,543. About 24.7% of families and 27.2% of the population were below the poverty line, including 35.0% of those under age 18 and 13.5% of those age 65 or over. East Los Angeles has a very large Latino population that consists of Mexicans, Salvadorans, Guatemalans, Hondurans, and Nicaraguans.

=== Latino communities ===
These were the ten cities or neighborhoods in Los Angeles County with the largest percentage of Latino residents, according to the 2000 census:

1. East Los Angeles, California, 96.7%
2. Maywood, California, 96.4%
3. City Terrace, California, 94.4%
4. Huntington Park, California, 95.1%
5. Boyle Heights, Los Angeles, 94.0%
6. Cudahy, California, 93.8%
7. Bell Gardens, California, 93.7%
8. Commerce, California 93.4%
9. Vernon, California, 92.6%
10. South Gate, California, 92.1%

=== Homelessness ===
In 2022, Los Angeles Homeless Services Authority's Greater Los Angeles Homeless Count counted 617 homeless individuals in East Los Angeles.

Homeless population
Year	Pop.	±%
2016	231	—
2017	461	+99.6%
2018	343	−25.6%
2019	604	+76.1%
2020	550	−8.9%
2022	617	+12.2%
Source: Greater Los Angeles Homeless Count; Los Angeles Homeless Services Authority

== Government ==
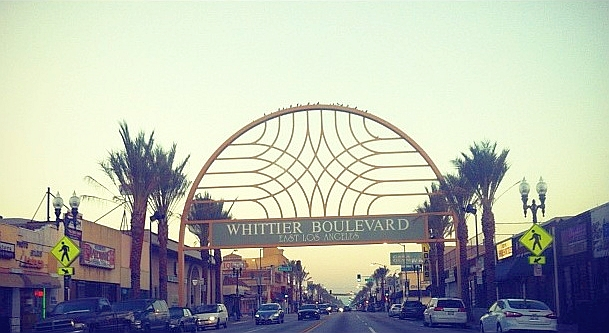
Sign on Whittier Blvd in East Los Angeles

In the United States House of Representatives house, East Los Angeles is in the California's 34th congressional district district served by Jimmy Gomez.

At the California State Legislature, East Los Angeles is in the 26th senatorial district, represented by Democrat María Elena Durazo, and in the 52nd Assembly district, represented by Democrat Jessica Caloza.

As East Los Angeles is an unincorporated community, it does not have a local government and relies on the County of Los Angeles for local services. Supervisor Hilda L. Solis represents East LA on the Board of Supervisors.

The East Los Angeles county hall houses the Los Angeles County Department of Public Works - East Los Angeles Building And Safety Office.

Since East Los Angeles is an unincorporated area, fire protection in East Los Angeles is provided by the Los Angeles County Fire Department with ambulance transport by Care Ambulance Service.

The Los Angeles County Sheriff's Department (LASD) operates the East Los Angeles Station in East Los Angeles.

The Los Angeles County Department of Health Services operates the Central Health Center in Downtown Los Angeles, serving East Los Angeles.

The United States Postal Service East Los Angeles Post Office is located at 975 South Atlantic Boulevard.

== Transportation ==
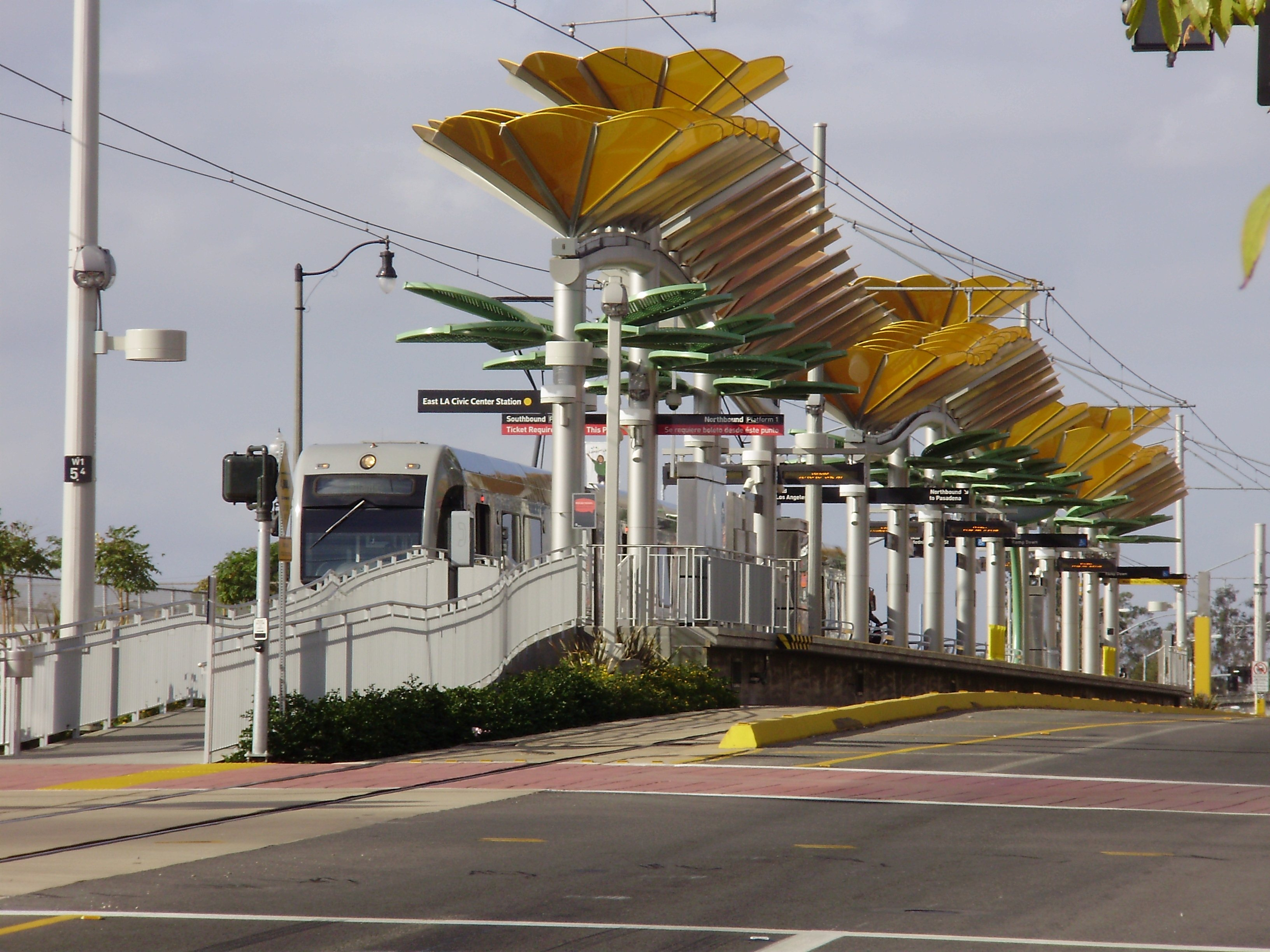
E Line Eastside Extension East LA Civic Center station

Light rail service to East Los Angeles is provided by the E Line's Eastside Extension, which opened in 2009 as an extension of the Gold Line. The E Line train is not the first light rail line to travel to East LA. In the early 1900s, people needing to access the cemeteries on the east side took the streetcar, the Stephenson Avenue Line. Stephenson Avenue (before 1920) now known as Whittier Boulevard. In time factories needed a better road to move their goods south. Stephenson Avenue was public choice. Historian Matt Roth of the Auto Club says Whittier Boulevard is the main thoroughfare through the east side. "The City Council renamed it Whittier Boulevard in 1921," he says, "out of recognition that it was serving an inter-regional function because it was the main road to Whittier and beyond." Into the 1960s Union Pacific Chicago-bound passenger trains made stops in East Los Angeles.

The Los Angeles County Metropolitan Transportation Authority (Metro) provides bus service from East Los Angeles. throughout the L.A. area. A Metro Customer Center is located at 4501 B Whittier Blvd. Local shuttle service is provided by El Sol (the East Los Angeles Shuttle).

The Metro Atlantic Parking Structure is a paid daily on-site parking with 238 spaces and paid reserved on-site parking 24 spaces supporting the E Line. Bike rack Spaces and bike lockers also support most E Line stations.

== Education ==
=== Primary and secondary schools ===
==== Public schools ====
East Los Angeles is split between Los Angeles Unified School District and Montebello Unified School District. LAUSD operates Amanecer PC in East Los Angeles, which is a preschool.

LAUSD elementary schools in East Los Angeles include Anton, Belvedere, Brooklyn Avenue, City Terrace, Eastman, Fourth Street, Ford Boulevard (open July 1, 1923), Harrison, Humphreys Avenue Elementary School and STEM Magnet School (open July 1, 1922), Robert F. Kennedy, Marianna, Rowan Avenue and Hamasaki Elementary medical and science magnet, originally named Riggin Elementary School and renamed in 1990. Montebello USD schools include Gascon Elementary School, Montebello Park Elementary School, and Winter Gardens Elementary School. At one time Hammel Elementary School was in East Los Angeles.

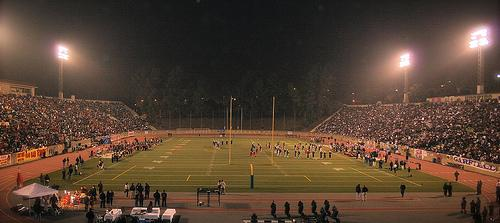
East LA Classic 2007 Halftime show

Middle schools include Belvedere and Griffith STEAM Magnet. In 2017, a petition was started to remove the name D. W. Griffith from the East Los Angeles middle school because his 1915 film The Birth of a Nation celebrated the Ku Klux Klan. Griffith who also co-produced The Life of General Villa, a biographical action–drama film starring Pancho Villa as himself, shot on location in Mexico during the Mexican Revolution.

James A. Garfield High School and Computer Science Magnet is the sole traditional LAUSD public high school in East Los Angeles. Garfield High School opened its doors in 1925, grades 7 through 12. It was a six-year school in which one could earn two diplomas, one from Garfield Junior High School after completion of 9th grade and one from Garfield Senior High School. By the late 1930s, Garfield became overcrowded and a new Junior High School for grades 7 through 9 was built, Kern Avenue Junior High School, located on Fourth Street and Kern Avenue, now called Griffith STEAM Magnet Middle School. Garfield High School participates in the "East LA Classic" against Theodore Roosevelt High School a football game that traditionally draws over 25,000 fans. Ramona Opportunity High School, an alternative all girl public high school, is in East Los Angeles serving grades 7-12. Esteban Torres High School opened in 2010 on the former Hammel Street Elementary School grounds and in former housing developments. There are five autonomous pilot high schools located on the Esteban E. Torres High School campus, part of the Los Angeles Education Partnership's network of partner and community schools. Monterey High School, a continuation high school, serves the needs of at-risk students in the East Los Angeles community.

In 2013 adult education programs from the Eastside Learning Center and East Los Angeles Occupational Center relocated at the East Los Angeles Star Hospital site to form an adult learning center and high school academy. The modified 1929, three-story structure houses the Hilda L. Solis Learning Academy School of Technology, Business and Education (STBE) high school and East LA Star Adult Education

East Los Angeles College (ELAC) was part of unincorporated East Los Angeles before it was annexed by Monterey Park in the early 1970s.

==== Charter schools ====
Other schools in the area include the Knowledge Is Power Program (KIPP) charter schools Raíces Academy (Grades Transitional kindergarten (TK)-4), Iluminar Academy (Grades TK-4), Sol Academy (Grades 5-8), Academy of Innovation (Grades 5-8). The KIPP is a nationwide network of free open-enrollment college-preparatory schools. The Arts in Action Community Charter Elementary School (Grades TK-5) open and started classes at its new school site in the 2019–2020 school year.

Five middle schools that include in 2014 the Ánimo Ellen Ochoa Charter Middle School was founded and named after former astronaut and Director of the Johnson Space Center. The Alliance College-Ready Middle Academy 8 opened August 1, 2014. The Arts in Action Charter Middle school opened in summer 2020.

Construction of a new Ednovate Charter High School to be named Esperanza College Prep was started in October 2021. Expected to be ready by fall 2022. Once completed, about 440 Esperanza students currently split between Hilda Solis Learning Academy and the former Our Lady of Soledad (Our Lady of Solitude) School will be taught under one roof. A performance space and a dance studio will allow a Baile Folklorico dance program to practice. The Alliance Morgan McKinzie High School opened August 31, 2009. The Oscar De La Hoya Ánimo Charter High School was temporary in the Salesian Boys and Girls Club of Los Angeles before it moved to it new location in Boyle Heights (it opened its doors in August 2003).

==== Private schools ====
The Roman Catholic Archdiocese of Los Angeles operates Catholic private schools in the CDP. Schools include Our Lady of Lourdes School (July 1, 1980 K-8), St. Alphonsus School (July 1, 1980 K-8), and Our Lady of Guadalupe School (July 1, 1980 K-8).

== Public libraries ==
=== East Los Angeles ===
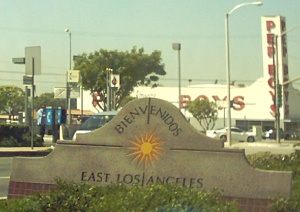
East Los Angeles welcome (bienvenidos) sign

The County of Los Angeles Public Library operates the East Los Angeles Library. The East Los Angeles Library opened on May 1, 1923; originally it was a collection of books in a store. A building was built to house the collection several months later. A new library building opened in 1924. In 1932 the library moved to a new building. In 1967 the library moved into another building, which was 15,120 square feet (1,405 m^{2}) large. In 2004 the library moved to its current location, a 26,300 square feet (2,440 m^{2}) facility designed by Stephen Finney of the Glendale firm CWA AIA, Inc. The current library has areas for adults and children, the Chicano Resource Center (CRC) established in 1976, a 175-person meeting room, a computer room, a Friends of the Library bookstore, and free parking areas. The library design has Mayan design and themes, as requested from area residents. References to the sun and moon, which are themes in Mayan art, were incorporated in the library.

=== Anthony Quinn ===
The county operates the Anthony Quinn Library with a moderne architecture, originally known as the Belvedere Library, which opened in January 1914. In 1925 the library moved to a storefront facility; at that time its collection was several thousand books. In 1937 the library moved to a new site. In 1973 the library moved to its current location. On January 5, 1982, the library took its current name; the childhood house of actor Anthony Quinn was located on the present day site of the library, and the library was renamed after Quinn. In 1987, Quinn donated his collection of movie scripts, scrapbooks, and personal papers to the library named after him. The First Supervisorial District funded a renovation that occurred in 2000. The library reopened in February 2001 with a new appearance and new furnishings.

=== Other ===
The county operates the El Camino Real Library at 5,529 sq ft. with a meeting room capacity 45. The library opened in 1929 as the Stephenson Library. In 1972 the library moved to its current location, and in 1975 it was rededicated as the El Camino Real library, as it is located on the historic El Camino Real. The library was rededicated again in November 2014 after a renovation and expansion that added a meeting room, teen area, and outdoor reading patio. The county operates the City Terrace Library. The library has been in its current location since 1979 and refurbished in 2009.

== Notable places ==
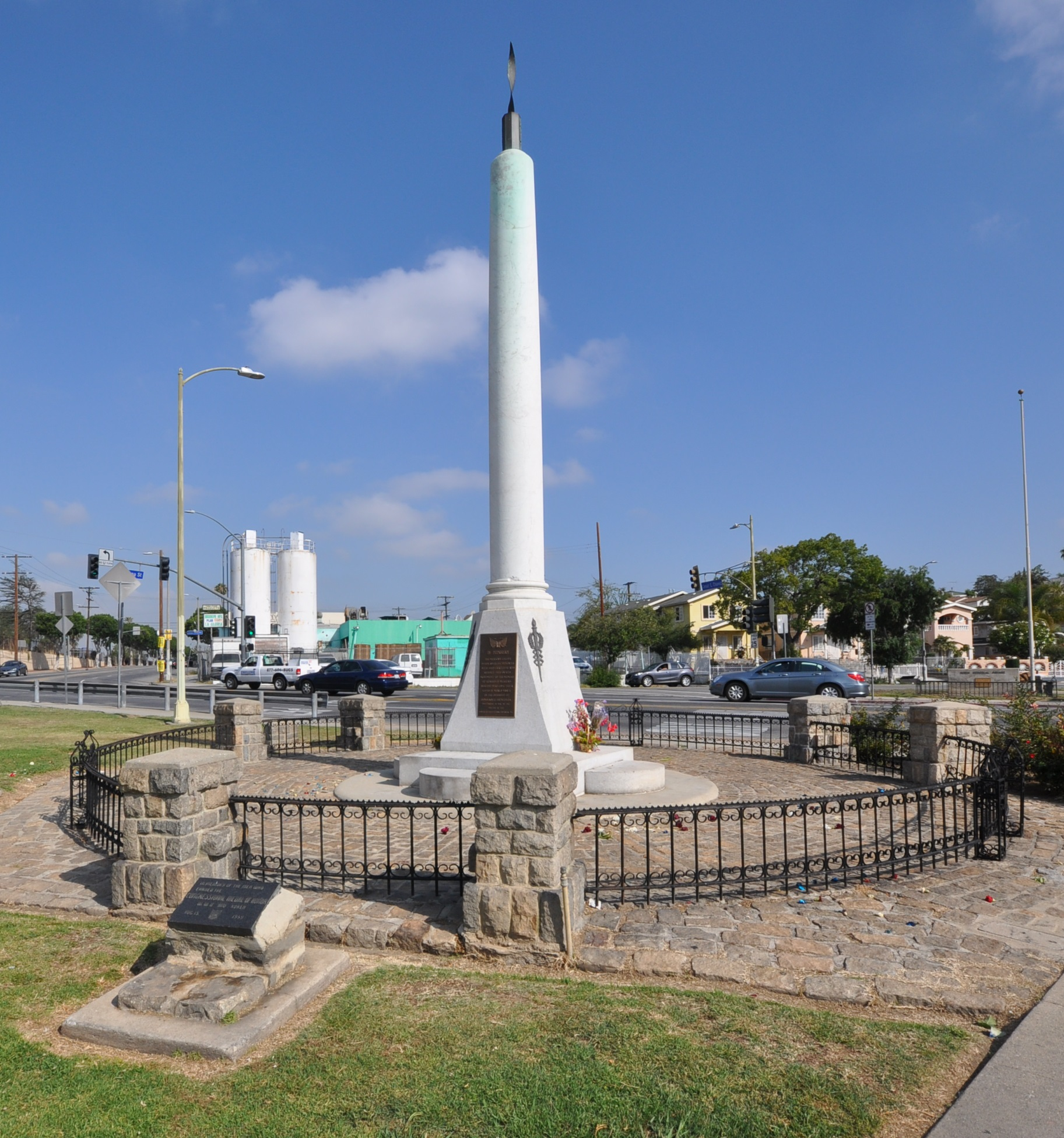
The Cinco Puntos Memorial honors Mexican-American/Chicano veterans of all wars.

=== New Calvary Cemetery ===
Calvary Cemetery was originally built in Los Angeles, in 1849. By 1896, the cemetery was full, and a new one was built across the LA river in East Los Angeles, on 127 acres (51 ha) of land. Many notable founders of early Los Angeles are interred here.

=== Our Lady of Solitude ===
Our Lady of Solitude, known as Soledad Church, opened its doors on Christmas Day in 1925. It is located in the neighborhood now known as Old Town Maravilla. The church was constructed in Spanish Colonial Revival architecture. In December 1931, the Church held its first outdoor procession in honor of Our Lady of Guadalupe, a ritual that continues today. The Guadalupe Procession is the oldest religious procession in Los Angeles.

Starting in the 1960s, labor leader Cesar Chavez and members of the United Farm Workers met with the Claretian priests, who also became activists, in the church's basement. The street in front of the church is known as Cesar Chavez Avenue. In October 1993, the Los Angeles City Council and the County Board of Supervisors approved the renaming of the stretch of roadway, but agreed to delay the change until 1994 and to put up historic plaques along Brooklyn Avenue to accommodate the opposition, many of whom believed that the new name would cause people to forget the Jewish history of the area. In 1979, the tile-clad cupola and bell tower were removed due to termite damage, and the bells were reinstalled near the church entrance.

=== The Golden Gate Theater ===
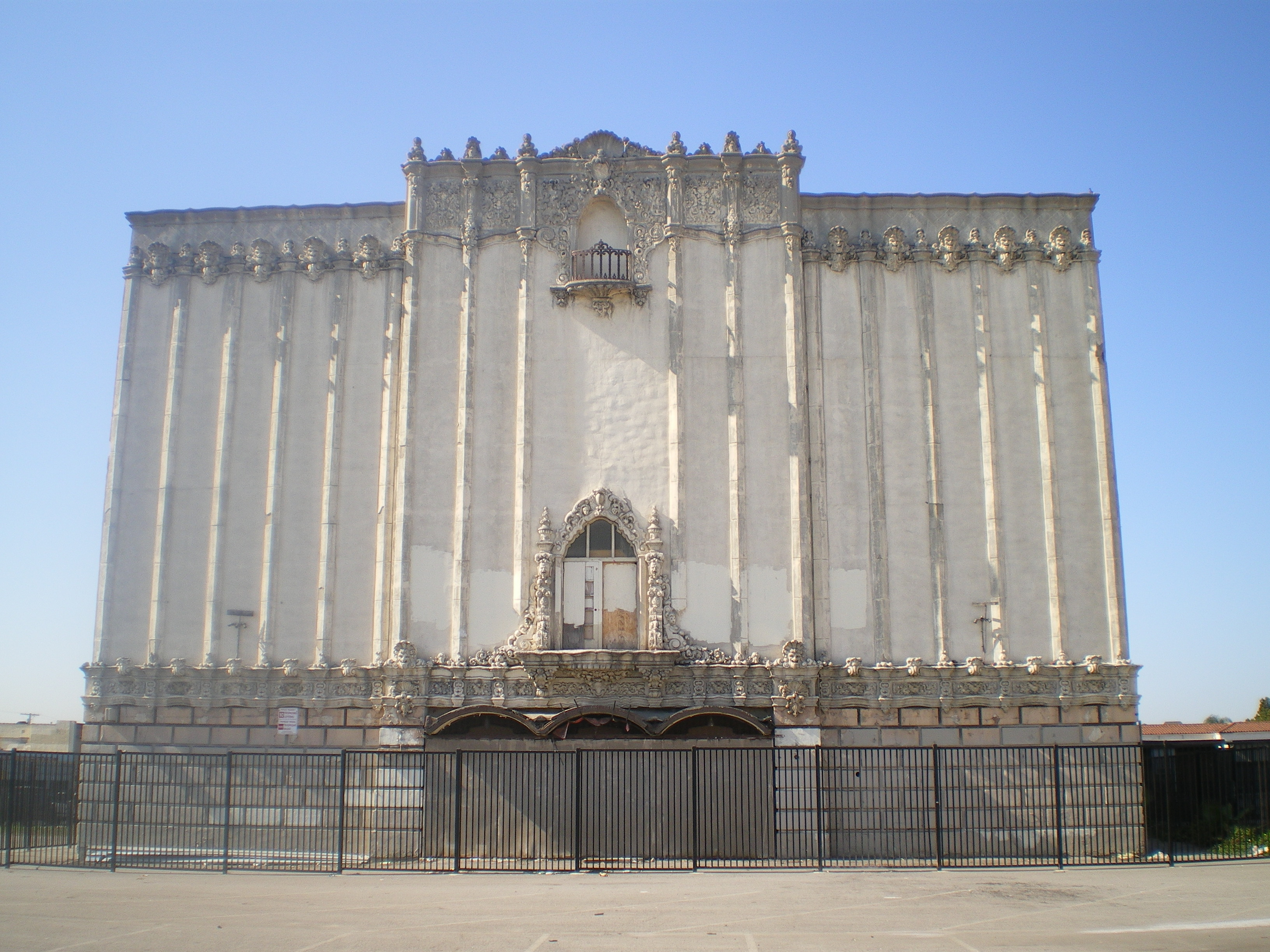
Golden Gate Theater in April 2008

The former Golden Gate Theater movie palace a Spanish Baroque Revival Churrigueresque-style building built in 1927, is one of fewer than two dozen buildings in Los Angeles in the Spanish Churrigueresque style and one of a few remaining in southern California. The Golden Gate Theater is the first East Los Angeles building listed in the National Register of Historic Places in 1982.

=== Maravilla Handball Court and El Centro Grocery ===
Completed in 1928 the Maravilla handball court was built brick-by-brick by residents, with the El Centro Grocery and residence added in 1946. The oldest remaining handball court in the Los Angeles region. In the early 1940s, Michi and Tommy Nishiyama operated the property and in the 1950s following Michi's internment at a Japanese relocation camp. The only court in East Los Angeles where players still played bola basca, also known as Basque pelota. In 2012, the Maravilla handball court and grocery store were put on the California Register of Historical Resources.

=== Veterans memorial ===
The obelisk-shaped monument at Atlantic Park was dedicated on May 30, 1930, during a Memorial Day Parade that ended at what was then called Belvedere Gardens Park. A plaque on the monument reads, "In memory of heroes of all American wars".

=== Latino Walk of Fame ===
The Walk of Fame is similar to the one in Hollywood but with a focus on Latino celebrities. The Latino Walk of Fame was inaugurated on April 30, 1997, to honor outstanding leaders who have made historical and social contributions with a Sun Plaque on Whittier Boulevard the heart of East Los Angeles. Spaces have been created for over 280 plaques. Permanent granite plaques have been put in place for the first 20 honorees. The merchants’ association of East Los Angeles sponsors a comprehensive clean-up campaign that cleans the sidewalks and gutters daily and removes litter and trash. Though the Latino Walk of Fame is there, it seems to go unnoticed, "The Latino Walk of Fame had a good run once it started...".

=== El Pino ===
El Pino (The Pine Tree) is a large bunya pine located on the southeastern corner of Folsom Street and N. Indiana Street overlooking the Wellington Heights neighborhood of East Los Angeles and the Boyle Heights from atop a small hill. The people of East Los Angeles consider the tree a living monument of the area's multifaceted ethnic background. The tree has become a symbol of community resistance to the gentrification of their neighborhood.

== Parks and recreation ==
Los Angeles County operates parks and recreation in East Los Angeles.

Built in 1942 and originally known as Soledad Park, the 39.1-acre (15.8 ha) Belvedere Community Regional Park has a baseball diamond and picnic area that was upgrade in the 1980s, basketball courts, a playground, community center, fitness zone, gymnasium, skate park, soccer field, splash pad, an Olympic-size swimming pool, and tennis courts. The park was renamed in 1949 and has a Vernacular architecture style. The LA county constructed a courthouse and sheriff's station on the south end of Belvedere Park in the mid-1950s. Then more buildings were added in time, in conjunction with the East Los Angeles Library, turning the southern end of the park into in effect a civic center. The construction of the Pomona Freeway (I-60) in the 1960s cut through the park, dividing it into two connected by a bridge. In the late 1960s the county also constructed a pond (Belvedere Lake) in the southern area of the park, known to locals as "El Parque de los Patos" (The duck park). The park is a popular place for festivals and host musicians, artisans, fishing and other events in its lakeside amphitheater. The California Department of Fish and Wildlife supplies the lake with rainbow trout during the Winter through early Spring and catfish during the Summer. There are also some largemouth bass, carp and bluegill in the lake. On August 29, 1970, Belvedere Park was the starting point of the Chicano Moratorium. An estimated 30,000 people marched from Belvedere Park to Laguna Park (now Salazar Park). In the 1990s the northern region of the part was revitalized.

Atlantic Avenue Park has a children's play area, picnic, and barbecue areas, a men's locker room, a women's locker room, and a 50-meter, six-lane swimming pool. In addition, the park has a rose garden maintained by volunteers.

Eugene A. Obregon Park is named after Eugene A. Obregon, a veteran and Medal of Honor recipient. The park's official opening was on May 26, 1966. The park includes basketball courts, ceramic rooms, a community room, a computer center, a fitness zone, a gymnasium, a multi-purpose field, a swimming pool, and a walking path.

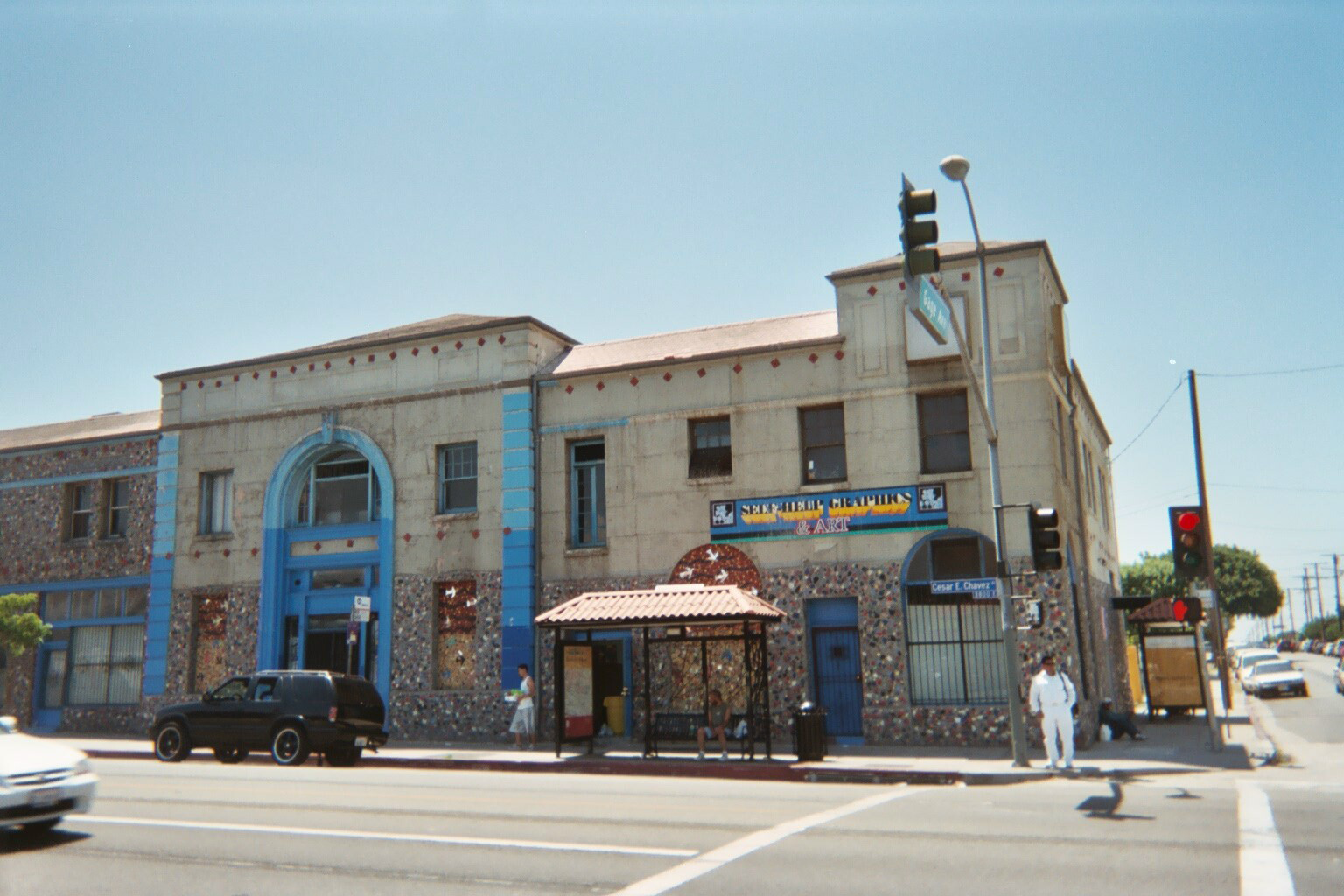
The Self-Help Graphics & Art a community arts center founded by a Franciscan nun started in this building completed in 1927.

The 8.4-acre (3.4 ha) Salazar Park is within East Los Angeles and has a moderne architecture. The county purchased the original 1.47 acres (0.59 ha) of park property from Cedars of Lebanon Hospital on March 8, 1938. The land was officially designated as the "East Los Angeles Playground" two months later. On June 25, 1940, the property was renamed the "Laguna Park and Playground." On September 17, 1970, the Los Angeles County Board of Supervisors gave the park its current name. The park includes a baseball diamond, basketball courts, a children's play area, a community room, a computer center, a gymnasium, picnic shelters, a senior center, a swimming pool, and tennis courts. On August 29, 2014, the County dedicated a plaque at the site in honor of Ruben Salazar.

The 4.8-acre (1.9 ha) Saybrook Park is also in East Los Angeles. The County Board of Supervisors approved final plans for developing the park on May 1, 1973. The park includes two outdoor basketball courts, a ball diamond, children's play areas, a community building with a community room, a computer technology building with a computer room, picnic and barbecue areas, and a tennis court.

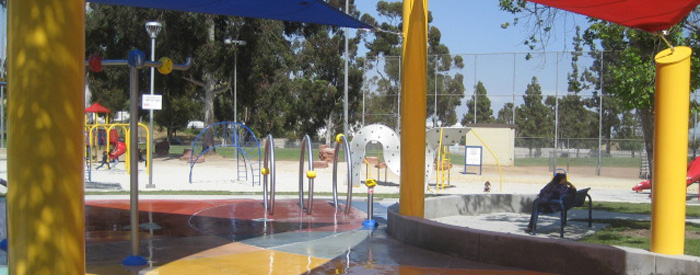
City Terrace Park

City Terrace County Park was developed in 1933 by Works Progress Administration crews; the park occupied a piece of 3.5 acres (1.4 ha) terrace that was formed after crews hacked a rugged and barren hill. In 1957 600,000 cubic yards (460,000 m^{3}) of soil that had been removed from the construction of the Los Angeles Civic Center was transported to the City Terrace County Park. The soil filled a ravine, tripling the park's original acreage. The park has a basketball court, a children's playground, a community room, a computer center, a gymnasium, a multi-purpose field, a swimming pool, and tennis courts.

The Eastside Eddie Heredia Boxing Club, operated by the county, is inside a former fire station. The club was named after Eddie Heredia, the first club champion, who died of leukemia at age 17. One of the members of the Heredia club became a member of the United States Olympic Boxing Team and entered the 2008 Beijing Olympics.

== Notable people ==
- Efraín Álvarez, soccer player
- Roberto Esteban Chavez, artist, muralist
- Gary Clarke, American actor best known for his role as Steve Hill
- Oscar De La Hoya, world boxing champion and 1992 Olympic gold medalist, born to Mexican migrant farmworker parents
- Jaime Escalante, educator, subject of the film Stand and Deliver
- Seniesa Estrada, world boxing champion
- Dorothy Granada, nurse, humanitarian, and peace and social justice activist who was raised in East Los Angeles and won the International Pfeffer Peace Award in 1997
- Suzanna Guzmán, mezzo soprano, an original associate artists of Los Angeles Opera
- Antonia Hernandez, philanthropist, attorney, activist
- Sam Johnson, American football player
- Patrick Kearney, serial killer, rapist, and necrophile
- Constance Marie, actress
- Carlos Mencia, comedian
- Xavier Montelongo, professional boxer
- Carlos Montes, Chicano activist and co-founder of the Brown Berets
- Sergio Mora, boxer
- Julian Nava United States Ambassador to Mexico and prominent educator
- Edward James Olmos, actor, producer, and director
- Dan Peña, financial analyst on Wall Street
- Anthony Quinn, actor
- Luis J. Rodriguez, writer and activist
- Lucille Roybal-Allard, U.S. Representative
- Hope Sandoval, singer and songwriter
- Jesse Valadez, owner of the famous lowrider Gypsy Rose
- Linda Vallejo is an American artist known for painting, sculpture and ceramics.
- Antonio Villaraigosa, 41st mayor of Los Angeles
- Maria Helena Viramontes, writer and professor
- Ersi Arvizu, boxer, singer and composer

== See also ==
- Calvary Cemetery (Los Angeles)
- Chicano Moratorium
- East L.A. walkouts
- East Los Streetscapers
- Golden Gate Theater
- Home of Peace Cemetery (East Los Angeles)
- Ruben Salazar
- Zoot Suit Riots
- List of U.S. cities with large Hispanic populations
- History of Mexican Americans in Los Angeles
- Cholo (subculture)
