= El Sol (bus line) =

El Sol Shuttle
- Parent: Los Angeles County Department of Public Works
- Founded: 2000
- Service area: East Los Angeles
- Service type: Neighborhood shuttle bus
- Routes: 3
- Website: lagobus.com

El Sol (The Sun in Spanish—also known as the East Los Angeles Shuttle) is a neighborhood shuttle bus service that operates in the unincorporated East Los Angeles area of Los Angeles County. It is a service of the Los Angeles County Department of Public Works.

There are currently three lines in the El Sol Shuttle service:

- City Terrace / East Los Angeles College (in Monterey Park)
- Whittier Boulevard / Saybrook Park. in East Los Angeles
- Union Pacific / Salazar Park. in East Los Angeles

At the East Los Angeles Civic Center at 3rd Street and Fetterly Ave. passengers can transfer among the three shuttle lines. The shuttles routes are designed so that residents can connect to various regional bus and rail services, including Alhambra Community Transit, City of Commerce Municipal Bus, Foothill Transit, LADOT DASH & Commuter Express, MTA, Metrolink, Montebello Bus Lines, and Monterey Park Spirit Bus. The stops include the Roybal Comprehensive Health Center, the California State University, Los Angeles, East LA Community College. Stops also include the shopping areas on Cesar Chavez Avenue, Whittier Boulevard, and the Commerce Shopping Center.

The service began June 5, 2000, starting with one-way circular lines that were later upgraded to two-way service on each of the lines.

Service for Sundays began November 15, 2009 with the opening of the Gold Line Eastside Extension.
