= Montebello Bus Lines =

Los Angeles Area bus line

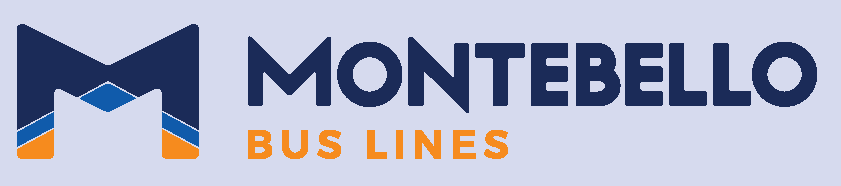

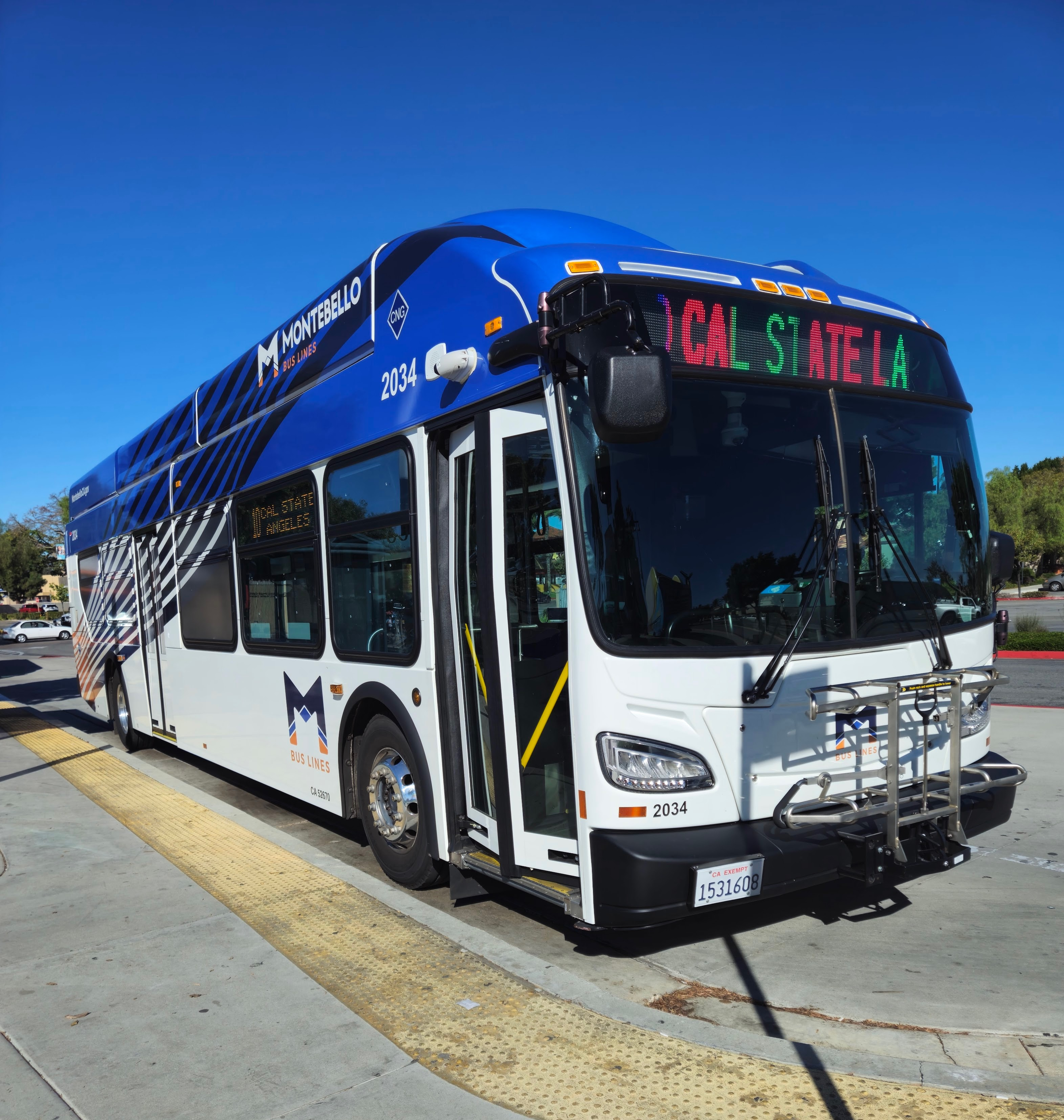
- Montebello Bus Lines bus at Whittwood Town Center
- Parent: City of Montebello
- Founded: July 28, 1931
- Headquarters: 400 Taylor Avenue South
- Locale: Montebello, California
- Service area: see #Service area
- Service type: bus service, paratransit
- Routes: 8
- Stops: 950 (FY2014)
- Fleet: 66 fixed-route fleet (FY2014)
- Annual ridership: 7,934,976 (FY2014)
- Fuel type: hybrid, CNG, diesel
- Website: RideMBL.com

Montebello Bus Lines is a municipal bus operator in Montebello, California, USA, mainly serving East Los Angeles, Commerce, and Montebello.

== History ==
Montebello Bus Lines began on 28 July 1931, with a small lot on the corner of Greenwood Avenue and Olympic Boulevard, where the four buses the agency operated were housed. The conception of Montebello Bus Lines came after several other transport services had served the area.

Two years after the City of Montebello was incorporated in 1920, the City launched its first attempt at operating a municipal bus route. But the City then decided to sell its bus operation to the Motor Transport Company in 1928.

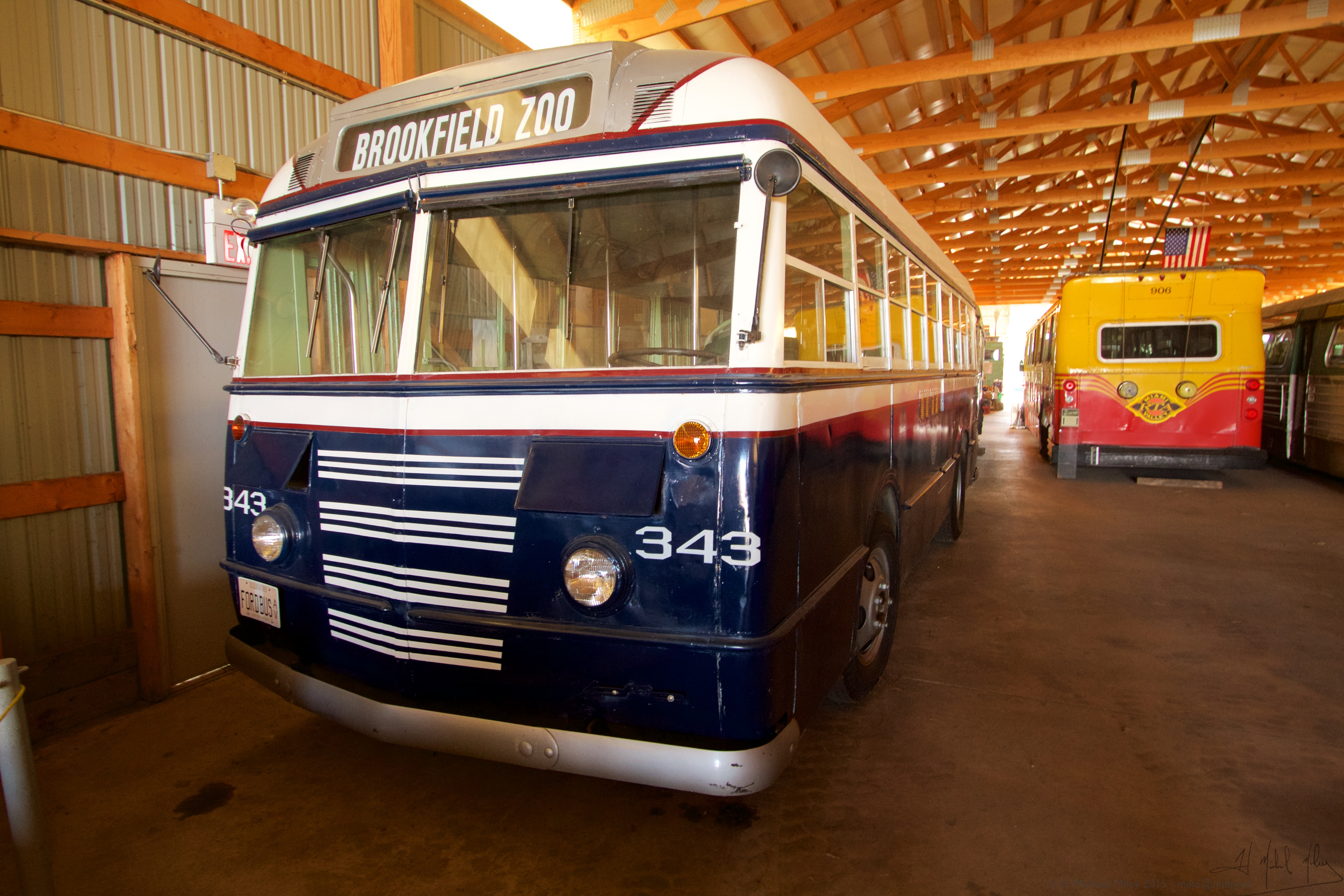
Former Montebello bus 17, a 1944 Ford Transit Bus, is preserved at the Illinois Railway Museum, repainted and renumbered for a former Chicago-area bus company.

Three years later, in 1931, the City purchased the route back from the Motor Transport Company, and Montebello Bus Lines was born. In the agency's early days, passengers paid a nickel to ride the bus and bus operators earned $120 per month.

Montebello Bus Lines has grown to be the third largest municipal transport agency in Los Angeles County, operating seven local routes, an express route, a semi-fixed-route feeder service and a Dial-a-Ride service. Montebello Bus Lines serves 15 communities, providing transport to 8 million passengers on an annual basis.

As of September 2013, Montebello Bus Lines has 7 compressed natural gas (CNG) buses, 44 hybrid buses and plans to replace its 15 remaining diesel fuel buses with CNG in next few years. It also owns a CNG fueling station to service the fleet.

The American Public Transportation Association (APTA) has recognized Montebello Bus Line's service. Montebello Bus Lines is the recipient of APTA's Outstanding Transport System Award and APTA's top Silver Safety Award in 1999, as well as the Achievement Award in 1997, 1998, 2000 and 2002.

== Service area ==
Within its service area of approximately 67 square kilometers, Montebello Bus Lines serving the communities of:

- Alhambra
- Bell Gardens
- Boyle Heights
- Commerce
- Downtown Los Angeles
- East Los Angeles
- La Mirada
- Montebello
- Monterey Park
- Pico Rivera
- Rosemead
- San Marino
- South Gate
- South San Gabriel
- Whittier

== Fixed-route service ==
Montebello Bus Lines consists of 8 routes in the San Gabriel Valley Central and West. Montebello Bus Lines fixed route services can broadly be divided into three types: Major Local Services, Minor Local Services, and Peak Express Service. Routes 10, 20, and 40 are the major service routes. Routes 30, 50, 60, and 70 are the minor service routes. Route 90 is the express route.

=== Local routes ===
Sunday service is provided on New Year's Day, Memorial Day, Independence Day, Labor Day, Thanksgiving Day, and Christmas Day.

Route	Terminals		Via	Notes
10	Monterey Park; East Los Angeles College	Pico Rivera; Whittier Bl & Passons Bl	Whittier Bl	Serves Whittier College
10	Los Angeles; Cal State LA Transit Center	Whittier; Whittwood Mall	Whittier Bl	Serves Whittier College
20	San Gabriel; Pine St & Live Oak St	Montebello; Gage Av & Telegraph Rd	San Gabriel Bl, Montebello Bl, Greenwood Av	Serves The Shops at Montebello
30	Alhambra; Huntington Dr & Stoneman Av	South Gate; Firestone Bl & Garfield Av	Garfield Av	
40	Downtown LA; 4th St & Figueroa St	Whittier; Beverly Bl & Norwalk Bl	Beverly Bl	
50	Downtown LA; 4th St & Figueroa St	La Mirada; Adelfa Dr & Santa Gertrudes Av	Washington Bl	Serves Whittier College
60	Pico Rivera; San Gabriel River Pkwy	Pico Rivera; Serapis Av & Telegraph Rd	Passons Bl	
70	Montebello; The Shops at Montebello	Montebello; Mines Av & Greenwood Av	Via Campo, Wilcox Av, Mines Av	Serves Montebello/Commerce Metrolink Station

=== Commuter Express routes ===
Services operate weekdays only.

Route	Terminals		Via	Notes
90	Downtown LA; Beaudry Av & 5th St	Montebello; Taylor Ranch Park & Ride	SR 60, Beverly Bl	Route 90 Express operate alongside the Route 40 on Beverly Boulevard
90	Downtown LA; Beaudry Av & 5th St	Whittier; Beverly Bl and Norwalk Bl	SR 60, Beverly Bl	Route 90 Express operate alongside the Route 40 on Beverly Boulevard

== Flexible Transport Services ==
=== Montebello Link ===
Montebello Link begins operations in 1997. Montebello Bus Lines contracts five Metrolink feeder routes offers a curb-to-curb shuttle to and from the Montebello/Commerce Metrolink station during the peak hours. This reservation-based service utilizes shuttles that meet the Metrolink's arriving schedule in the morning and take passengers to major employment centers. The feeder routes also carry commuters back to the station in the afternoon.

=== Dial-A-Taxi ===
The City of Montebello has also operated Montebello Dial-A-Taxi since 2007, a program which offers transport for elderly residents and qualified handicapped persons of any age and their attendants.
