= Palms station =

Los Angeles Metro Rail station

Palms
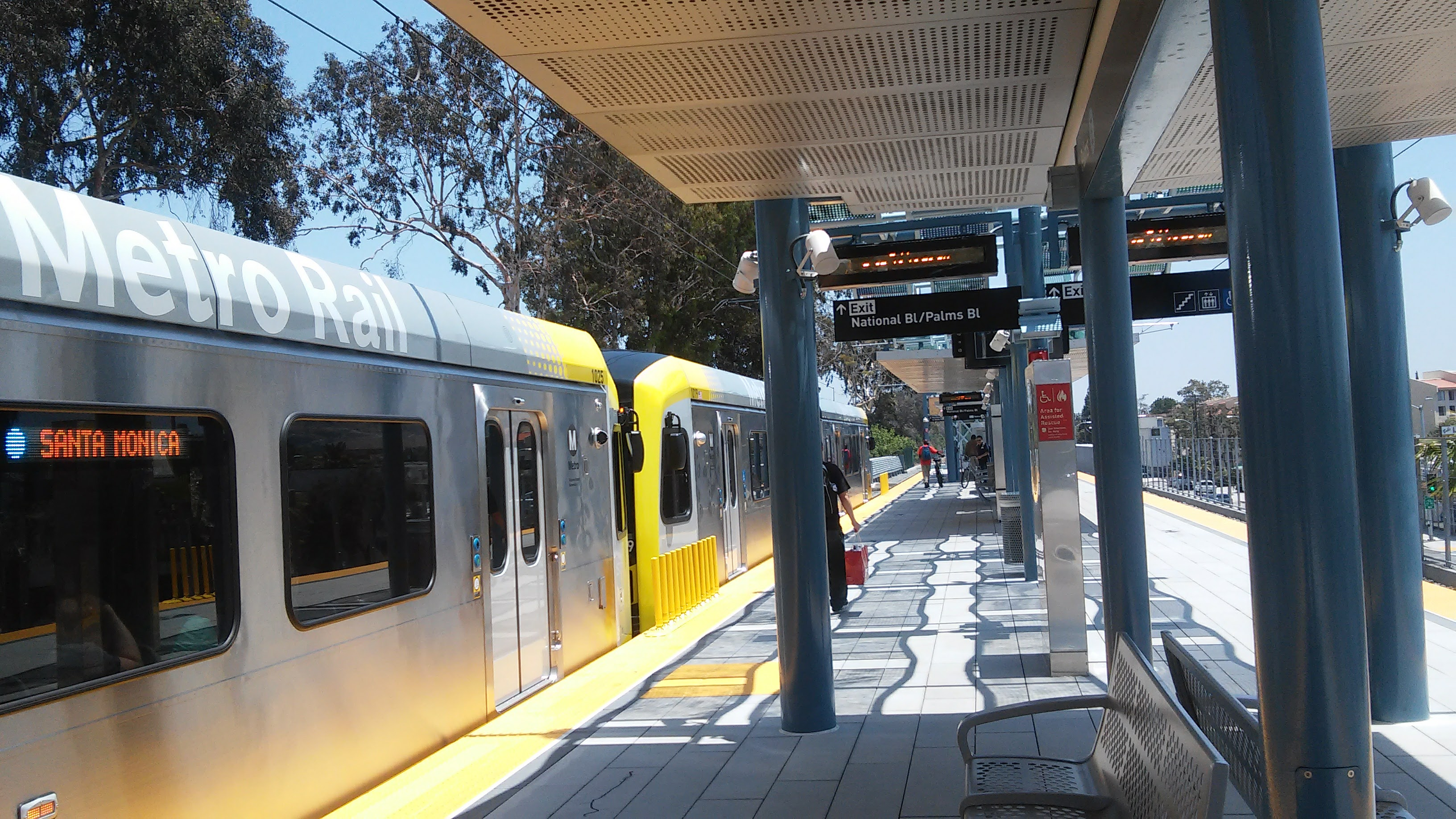
- Palms station platform, May 2016

General information
- Location: 10001 National Boulevard; Los Angeles, California
- Coordinates: 34.0291°N 118.4036°W
- Owner: Los Angeles County Metropolitan Transportation Authority
- Platforms: 1 island platform
- Tracks: 2
- Connections: Big Blue Bus

Construction
- Structure type: Embankment
- Cycle facilities: Metro Bike Share station, racks and lockers
- Accessible: Yes

History
- Opened: c. 1886
- Rebuilt: May 20, 2016
- Former names: The Palms; Bay View

Passengers
- FY 2025: 975 (avg. wkdy boardings)

Services
Preceding station	Metro Rail	Following station
Westwood/Rancho Park toward Santa Monica	E Line	Culver City toward East LA
Former services
Preceding station	Pacific Electric	Following station
Talamantes toward Rustic Canyon	Air Line	Culver Junction toward Pacific Electric Building
Location

Palms station is a light rail station located on an embankment on the E Line of the Los Angeles Metro Rail system. The station is located over the intersection of National Boulevard and Palms Boulevard in the Palms neighborhood of Los Angeles, after which the station is named.

== History ==
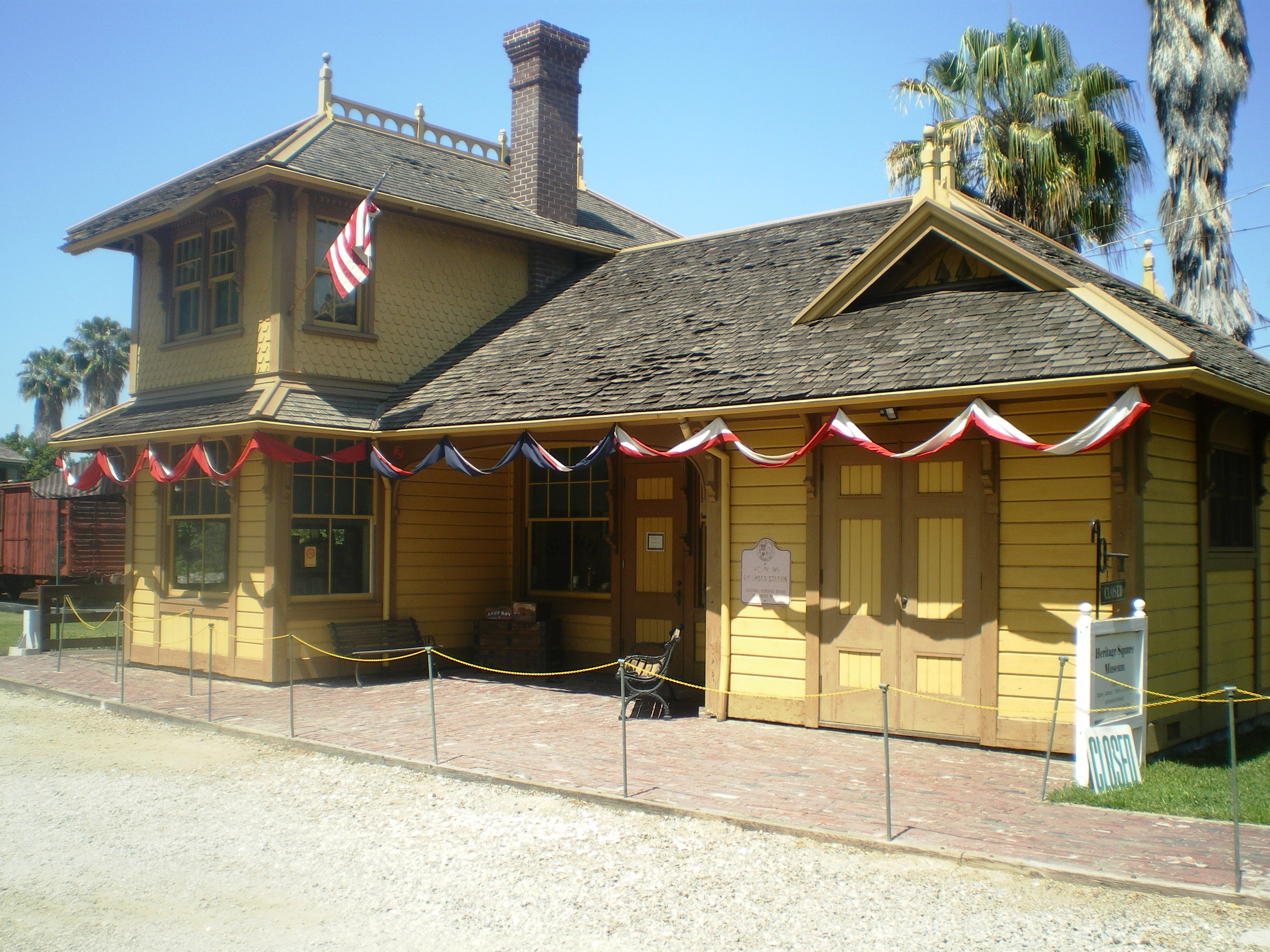
The Palms depot building (built c. 1886–1888), now at Heritage Square Museum.

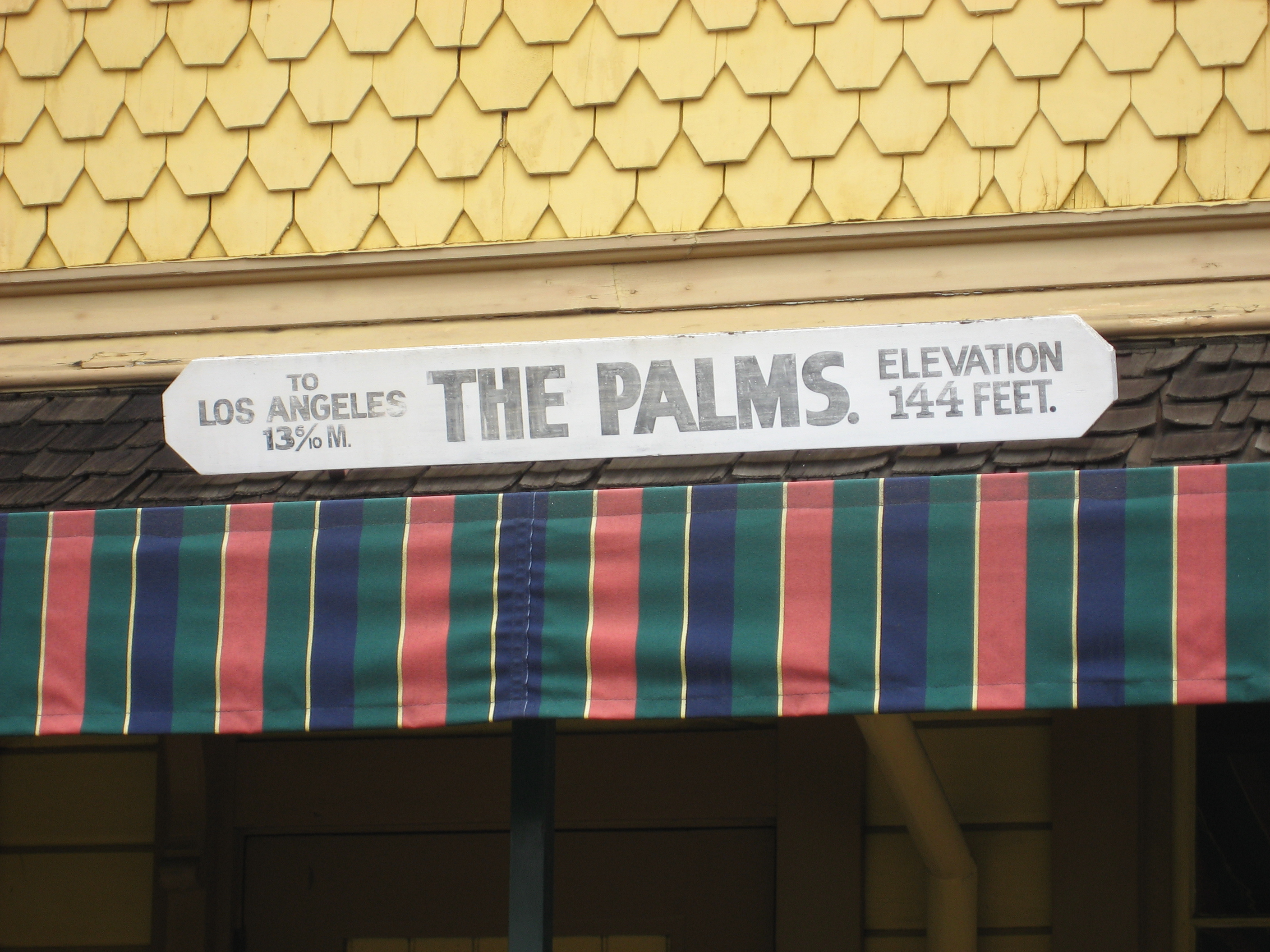
Station sign from The Palms train depot now in Heritage Square Museum

Bay View was a stop on the Los Angeles and Independence Railroad. It was renamed The Palms in 1886.

The Eastlake style Palms-Southern Pacific Railroad Depot building was situated approximately 600 yards (550 m) west of the present station, on the south side of the tracks, and remained in active rail service until the closure of the Santa Monica Air Line in 1953.

Used in many motion pictures, the building eventually fell into disrepair and abandonment but was declared a Los Angeles Historic-Cultural Monument in 1963. A grassroots organization, S.O.S. (Save Our Station), moved it in February 1976 to the Heritage Square Museum grounds in the Montecito Heights community of the Arroyo Seco. It now serves as the museum's gift shop and visitor center.

=== Station name ===
Originally slated to be renamed "National/Palms" on re-opening, it remains "Palms" as a result of a request by the Palms Neighborhood Council. The council's resolution stated that:

the Pacific Line Palms station was an important landmark on the west side of the city, and the community that grew around it is one of the oldest on the west side of Los Angeles. Our stakeholders feel the naming of the station is not only an important branding opportunity for Palms, but an opportunity for Los Angeles to reinstate a link to the history in one of its oldest and most diverse communities.

On April 25, 2013, the Metro board of directors voted in favor of "Palms" as the official name of the station.

== Service ==
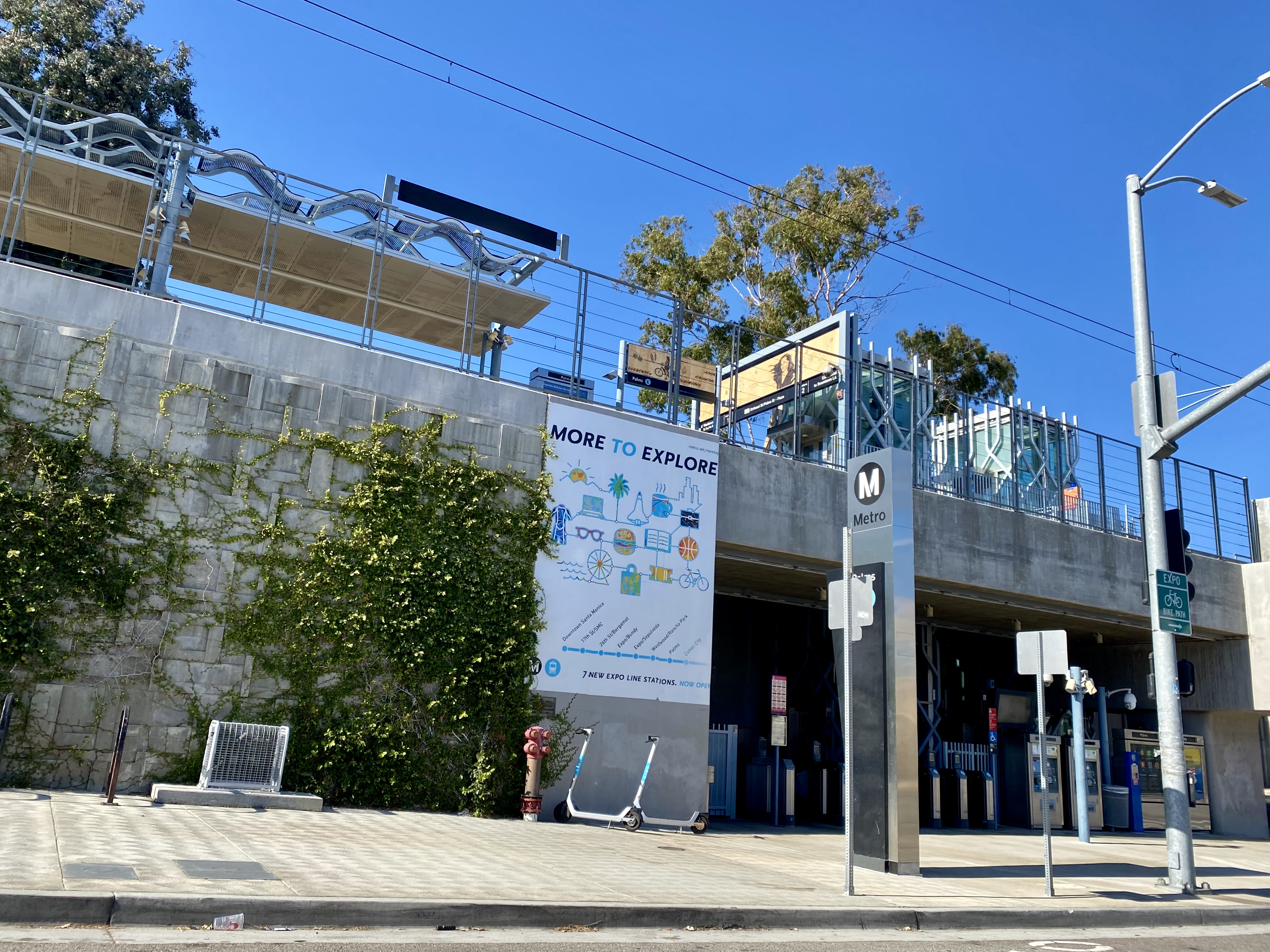
View of Palms station, Los Angeles Metro

=== Station layout ===
The station location is adjacent to I-10, just west of the three-way intersection of National, Palms and Exposition boulevards and perched on an embankment above National Boulevard. Access is provided by stairs and elevators at the east end of the station.

Construction incorporated an existing steel bridge from the Air Line era and added a new concrete bridge, both immediately east of the station over the National/Palms intersection, as well as re-using an existing rail tunnel west of the station.

=== Hours and frequency ===
E Line trains run through the station every day between approximately 4:00 a.m. and 1:00 am. In the daytime, trains operate every 8 minutes during the weekday peak and every ten minutes off-peak and during weekends and holidays. In the early morning and nighttime, trains operate every 20 minutes.

=== Connections ===
As of December 15, 2024, the following connections are available:

- Big Blue Bus (Santa Monica): 5, 17

== Points of interest ==
Attractions within walking distance of Palms station:

- Moreton Bay Fig Tree (Los Angeles, California)
