= Expo Park/USC station =

Los Angeles Metro Rail station

Expo Park/USC
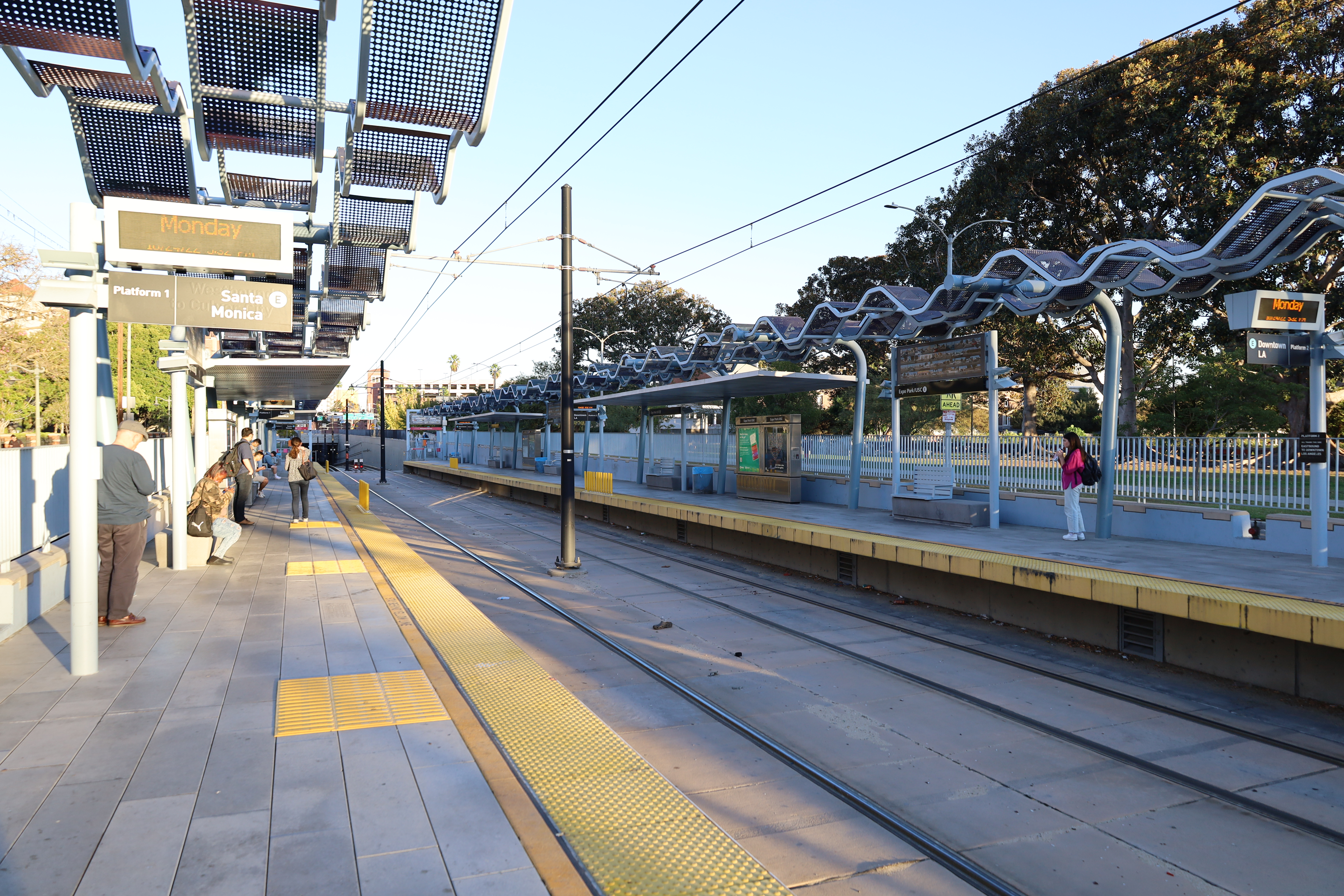
- Expo Park/USC station platform in 2022

General information
- Location: 661 West Exposition Boulevard; Los Angeles, California
- Coordinates: 34.0182°N 118.2866°W
- Owner: Los Angeles County Metropolitan Transportation Authority
- Platforms: 2 side platforms
- Tracks: 2
- Connections: See Connections section

Construction
- Structure type: At-grade
- Cycle facilities: Racks
- Accessible: Yes

History
- Opened: October 17, 1875
- Rebuilt: April 28, 2012
- Former names: University

Passengers
- FY 2025: 1,318 (avg. wkdy boardings)

Services
Preceding station	Metro Rail	Following station
Expo/Vermont toward Santa Monica	E Line	Jefferson/USC toward East LA
Former services
Preceding station	Pacific Electric	Following station
11th Avenue toward Rustic Canyon	Air Line	Grand toward Pacific Electric Building
Location

Expo Park/USC station is an at-grade light rail station on the E Line of the Los Angeles Metro Rail system in Los Angeles, California, United States. The station is located in the center median of Exposition Boulevard near entrances to Exposition Park (Expo Park) and the University of Southern California (USC), after which the station is named. The 37th Street/USC station for the J Line of the Los Angeles Metro Busway system is located a few blocks east of the station.

The station is located close to several major museums and sporting venues including BMO Stadium, the California Science Center and the Los Angeles Memorial Coliseum. During the 2028 Summer Olympics, the station will serve spectators traveling to and from venues at Exposition Park including opening/closing ceremonies along with track and field events at the Coliseum and flag football and lacrosse at BMO Stadium.

== History ==
=== Pacific Electric stop ===
Originally a stop on the Los Angeles and Independence and Pacific Electric railroads, it closed on September 30, 1953, with closure of the Santa Monica Air Line and remained out of service until re-opening on Saturday, April 28, 2012. It was completely rebuilt for the opening of the Expo Line from little more than a station stop marker. Regular scheduled service resumed Monday, April 30, 2012.

It is the last former station stop of the Santa Monica Air Line to be re-opened. The E line travels north on a new right-of-way along Flower street from this stop. The original Air line right-of-way remains owned by Metro and continues east to the A line tracks, however no plans are in place for its use.

=== Modern light rail station ===
Expo Park/USC Station (originally proposed as "USC/Exposition Park") was proposed by Metro staff, with input from the public, during the Environmental Impact Report (EIR) process. Many stakeholders cited the importance of the station, citing the convenient access it would provide the USC students/employees and Exposition Park guests. Moreover, the station would be crucial for a temporary professional football venue at the current Los Angeles Memorial Coliseum, the soccer-specific Banc of California Stadium that replaced the Los Angeles Memorial Sports Arena, as well as for the 2028 Summer Olympics.

The administration of USC opposed at-grade light-rail along Exposition Boulevard, claiming that light-rail would separate the campus from Exposition Park. USC President Steven Sample, in particular, was opposed to the project. Sample said he feared the line would create physical and psychological barriers between USC, Exposition Park, and the local community, and would be dangerous for pedestrians.

However, the general sentiment of students and neighbors was in support of the line. The Coliseum Commission took a strong position in support of this station, and the USC Student Senate passed a resolution in support of the station. In the end, Metro staff included the possibility of building the Expo Park/USC station by including it as a design option in the Final EIR, that would only be built if funds for the station (estimated at $5 million) could be found and if local support were present. The report also recommended a short tunnel segment under the impacted intersections of Exposition/Figueroa and Exposition/Flower.

Once the FEIR had been approved, the Exposition Metro Line Construction Authority worked to secure the funds for this station and to negotiate its design. One other issue remaining to be resolved was USC's request for special architecture for the three stations serving the campus.

Ultimately, USC did not contribute toward the cost of the station. The Authority also abandoned any considerations for special architecture requested by USC. On September 19, 2007, the Metro board approved funding for the cost of the station, which had increased to $7 million. This allowed the station to be built along with the rest of Phase 1.

The station opened with the rest of Phase 1 of the Expo Line on April 28, 2012, and became part of the E Line when the Regional Connector tunnel opened on June 16, 2023.

== Service ==
=== Station layout ===
The station has two side platforms in the median of Exposition Blvd that exit to a crosswalk connecting to Expo Park on its south side and USC on its north. The station's platforms slope down slightly toward the east, in order to accommodate the line's descent into a tunnel which passes under Figueroa Street.

=== Hours and frequency ===
E Line service hours are from approximately 4:30 a.m. and 11:45 p.m daily. Trains operate every 8 minutes during peak hours, Monday to Friday. Trains run every 10 minutes, during midday on weekdays and weekends, from 9:00 a.m. to 7:00 p.m. Night and early morning service is approximately every 20 minutes every day.

An eastbound E line train arriving at the station in January 2024.

=== Connections ===
As of December 15, 2024, the following connections are available:

- LADOT Commuter Express: 438*, 448*
- LADOT DASH: F, King-East, Southeast
- Los Angeles Metro Bus: 2, 81, 102, Express 460, Express 550*
- Los Angeles Metro Busway: J Line: 910, 950 (at 37th Street/USC station)
- Torrance Transit: 4X*

Note: * indicates commuter service that operates only during weekday rush hours.

== Notable places nearby ==
The station is within walking distance of the following notable places:

- BMO Stadium, home of professional soccer teams Los Angeles FC and Angel City FC
- California Science Center
- California African American Museum
- Exposition Park
- Exposition Park Rose Garden
- Los Angeles Memorial Coliseum, home of USC Trojans Football
- Natural History Museum of Los Angeles County
- University of Southern California

== Station artwork ==
The station's art was created by artist Robbert Flick. The installation, entitled "On Saturdays", includes sequences of photographs taken on the boulevards near the station, creating a document of the local people and places as they were when the station was built.
