= Amoco Junction, Los Angeles =

Former railway junction in Los Angeles, US

Coordinates: 34.014373°N 118.243152°W

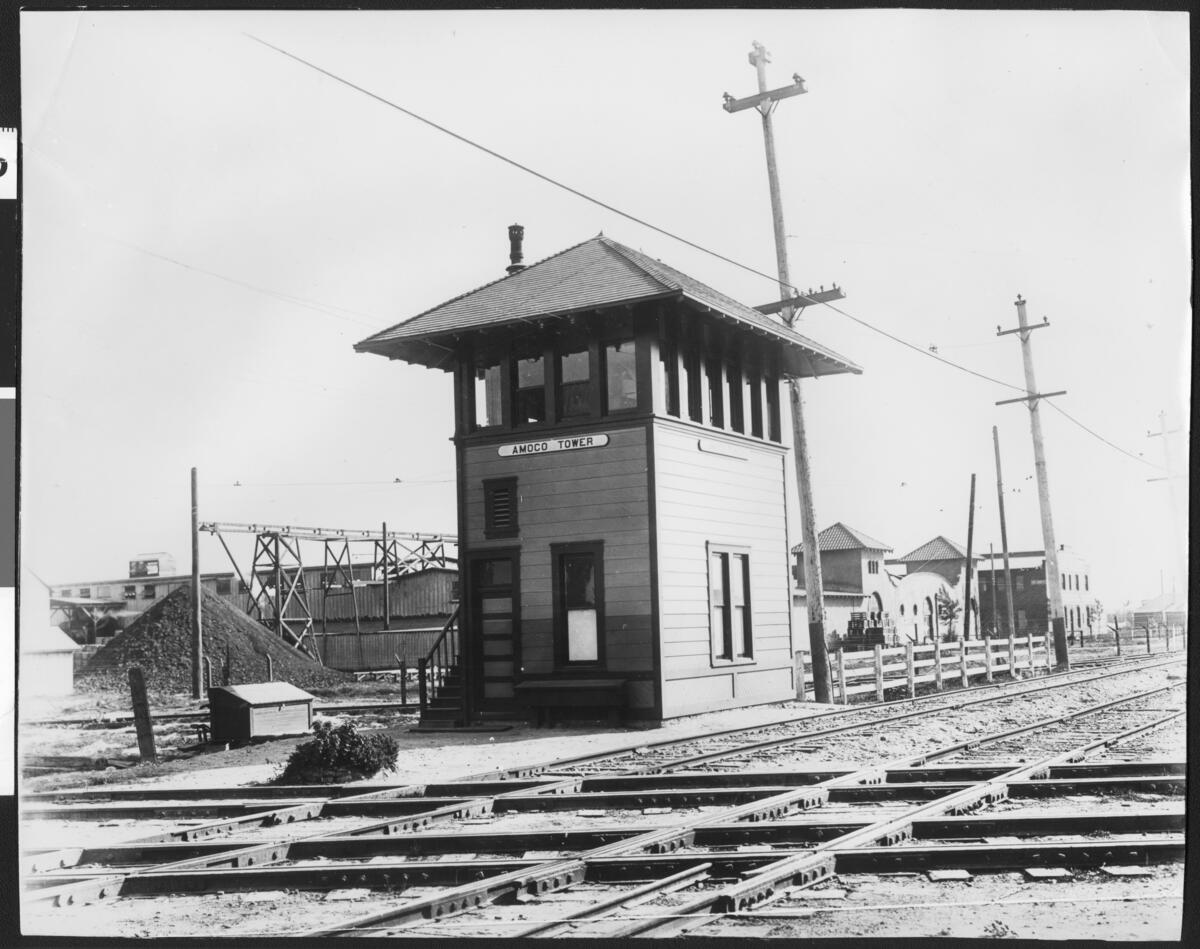
The tower at Amoco Junction, 1904

Amoco Junction was a junction in the Pacific Electric Railway's Southern District. It was located in Nevin, South Central Los Angeles at 25th Street and Long Beach Avenue. It was named after a nearby American Olive Company (AmOCo) plant.

It was the junction where the Santa Monica Air Line split off from the Watts, Long Beach, and other Southern District Lines. It was one of several points at which a tower crossed the quadruple tracks between Downtown Los Angeles and Watts. Although Amoco was designated as a junction, many lines did not stop here. It was served only by local railway cars and the Air Line.

Service was provided to Amoco Junction between 1904 and 1958. A new 40-lever interlocking tower was put into commission on April 25, 1908. Though it is located along the route of the Los Angeles Metro A Line, it was not revived for use as a stop or station on it. Neither did it become a station on the Expo Line that replaced the Santa Monica Air Line.

Preceding station	Pacific Electric	Following station
University toward Rustic Canyon	Air Line	Pacific Electric Building Terminus
Adams Boulevard toward Watts	Watts; Local	22nd Street toward Pacific Electric Building
