= Old Growth (New/Now) =

Public art installation opposite the Culver City Metro Station

Coordinates: 34.0290°N 118.3865°W

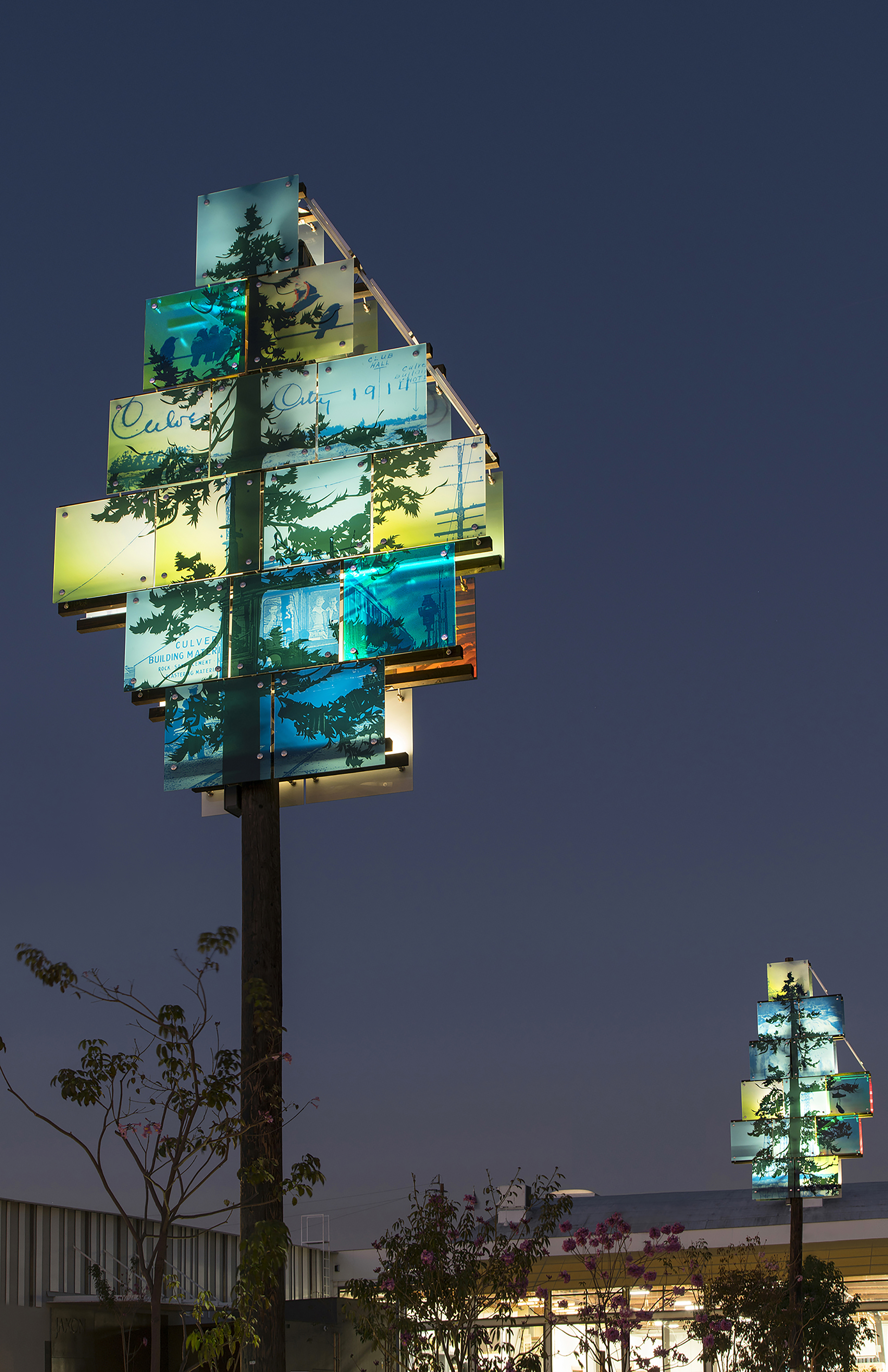
- Artist: Alison Wright (with Graphic Designer, Jeanie Chong) Courtesy of William D. Feldman of Venice Pacific Investments
- Year: 2018
- Type: Installation art
- Dimensions: (2) 40’ x 12’ x 2’-9”
- Location: Culver City, California, United States
- Website: oldgrowthnewnow.org

Old Growth (New/Now) is a large scale exterior public art installation by architect and artist Alison Wright. It is located opposite to the Culver City Metro Station.

Electric poles and cross arms support 56 pieces of glass. Historic images from the archives of Southern California Edison and the Culver City Historical Society are placed on one side of the glass. The glass panels on the other side form a Douglas fir tree, a type of tree that wood utility poles originated from. Unlike typical utility poles, these 40’ tall poles are not connected by power lines. The glass panels are backlit by solar energy via solar panels.
