= Washington Nationals (disambiguation) =

The Washington Nationals is the existing National League baseball team, formerly known as the Montreal Expos.

Washington National or Washington Nationals may also refer to:

== Sports ==
Washington Nationals may also refer to these other Washington, D.C.–based baseball teams (listed chronologically):

- Washington Nationals (National Association), a team of the 1870s
- Washington Nationals, a team in the National Association (1879–1880)
- Washington Nationals (American Association), a team that played in 1884
- Washington Nationals (Union Association), a team that played in 1884
- Washington Nationals (1886–1889), a National League team
- Washington Senators (1891–1899), an American Association and National League team, also called the Washington Nationals
- Washington Senators (1901–1960), an American League franchise, also known as the Washington Nationals between 1905 and 1955, now the Minnesota Twins

== Other uses ==
- Washington National, alternate name for Ronald Reagan Washington National Airport (DCA), serving the District of Columbia
  - Ronald Reagan Washington National Airport station (Washington National station), Washington Metro station serving the airport
- Washington/National (LACMTA Station), Los Angeles, California, USA; an L.A. Metro Rail rapid transit station

== See also ==
- Washington Senators (disambiguation)
- History of Washington, D.C. professional baseball
- Washington Internationals (disambiguation)
- Washington (disambiguation)
- National (disambiguation)
