= La Cienega/Jefferson station =

Los Angeles Metro station

La Cienega/Jefferson
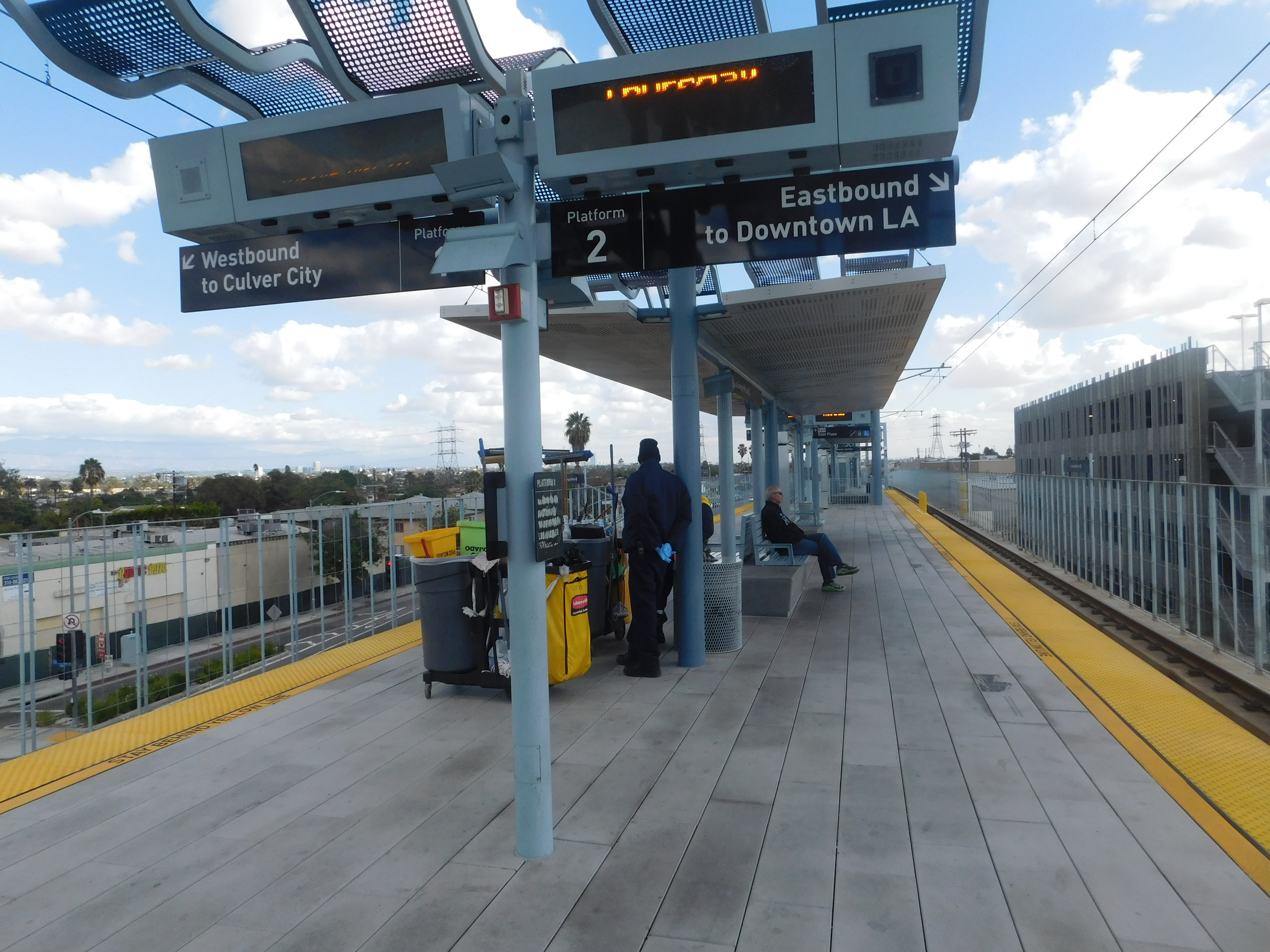
- La Cienega/Jefferson station platform, November 2015

General information
- Location: 5664 West Jefferson Boulevard; Los Angeles, California
- Coordinates: 34.0260°N 118.3721°W
- Owner: Los Angeles County Metropolitan Transportation Authority
- Platforms: 1 island platform
- Tracks: 2
- Connections: Culver CityBus; Los Angeles Metro Bus; the Link

Construction
- Structure type: Elevated
- Parking: 476 spaces
- Cycle facilities: Racks and lockers
- Accessible: Yes

History
- Opened: October 17, 1875
- Rebuilt: April 28, 2012
- Former names: Sentous; Cassirani Ranch

Passengers
- FY 2026: 1,557 (avg. wkdy boardings)

Services
Preceding station	Metro Rail	Following station
Culver City toward Santa Monica	E Line	Expo/La Brea toward East LA
Former services
Preceding station	Pacific Electric	Following station
Culver Junction toward Rustic Canyon	Air Line	Airville toward Pacific Electric Building
Location

La Cienega/Jefferson station is an elevated light rail station on the E Line of the Los Angeles Metro Rail system. The station is over the intersection of La Cienega Boulevard and Jefferson Boulevard, after which the station is named, in the Baldwin Hills neighborhood of Los Angeles.

The station briefly served as the western terminus of the E Line between the opening of the line on April 28, 2012, and the completion of the Culver City station on June 20, 2012.

== History ==
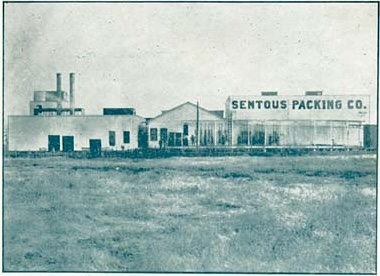
Sentous Packing Co. 1906

La Cienega/Jefferson station was once named Sentous station when it was on the Santa Monica Air Line of the Los Angeles and Independence and later Pacific Electric railroads. The Louis Sentous meat packing facility was nearby; they used the Air Line to ship meat to downtown Los Angeles. The original Air Line stop closed on September 30, 1953. The Sentous Yard maintenance facility persisted long after the passenger station was gone; it occupied "a portion of the right-of-way directly east of La Cienega, and spur tracks and sidings exist directly west of La Cienega".

A new light rail station opened on Saturday, April 28, 2012. It was completely rebuilt for the commencement of the Expo Line from little more than a station stop marker. Regular scheduled service resumed the following Monday, April 30.

=== Development of surrounding area ===
Los Angeles architect Eric Owen Moss proposed a 17-story glass ribbon office tower with underground parking within steps of this station. The tower began preparation in late 2018. The office tower known as the "(W)rapper" building opened in April 2023.

Condominiums and retail across from the station were being developed by the Carmel Partners firm known as the Habitat Residence. The 12-story unit complex and luxury residential community opened in May 2026.

== Service ==
=== Station layout ===
A large parking structure located just south of the station provides "park-and-ride" access to the station.

=== Hours and frequency ===
E Line service hours are from approximately 4:30 a.m. and 11:45 p.m daily. Trains operate every 8 minutes during peak hours, Monday to Friday. Trains run every 10 minutes, during midday on weekdays and weekends, from 9:00 a.m. to 7:00 p.m. Night and early morning service is approximately every 20 minutes every day.

=== Connections ===
As of December 15, 2024, the following connections are available:

- Culver CityBus: 4
- Los Angeles Metro Bus: 38, 105, 217
- the Link: Baldwin Hills Parklands Shuttle

== Station artwork ==
The station's public art was created by Daniel Gonzales and titled Engraved in Memory consisting of pole-mounted glazed ceramic bas relief panels depicting the history of the Ballona Creek and Culver City areas.
