= Bayview station =

Bayview station may refer to:

- Bayview station (Ottawa), an LRT station in Ottawa, Ontario, Canada
- Bayview station (Toronto), a Toronto subway station in Ontario, Canada
- Palms station, formerly Bay View station, a Los Angeles Metro Rail station in California, United States
