= Nevin, Los Angeles =

Human settlement in Los Angeles, California, US

Nevin
- Neighborhood of Los Angeles
- Location within Los Angeles
- Coordinates: 34°00′50″N 118°14′52″W
- Country: United States
- State: California
- County: Los Angeles
- City: Los Angeles
- Time zone: Pacific
- zip code: 90011, 90058
- Area code: 323

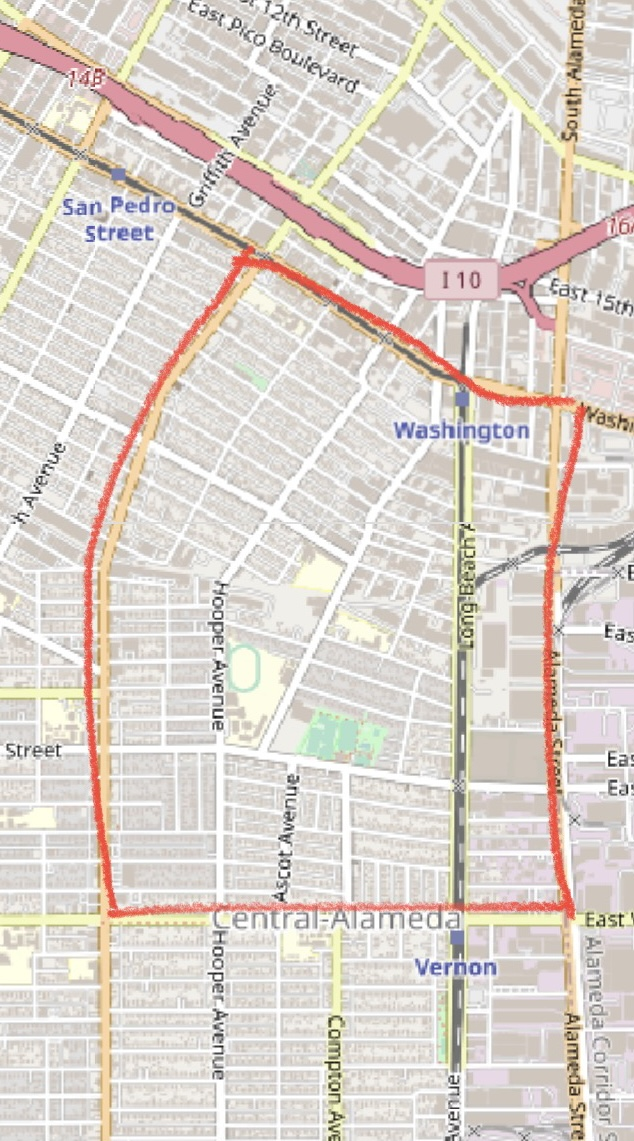
Nevin, Los Angeles

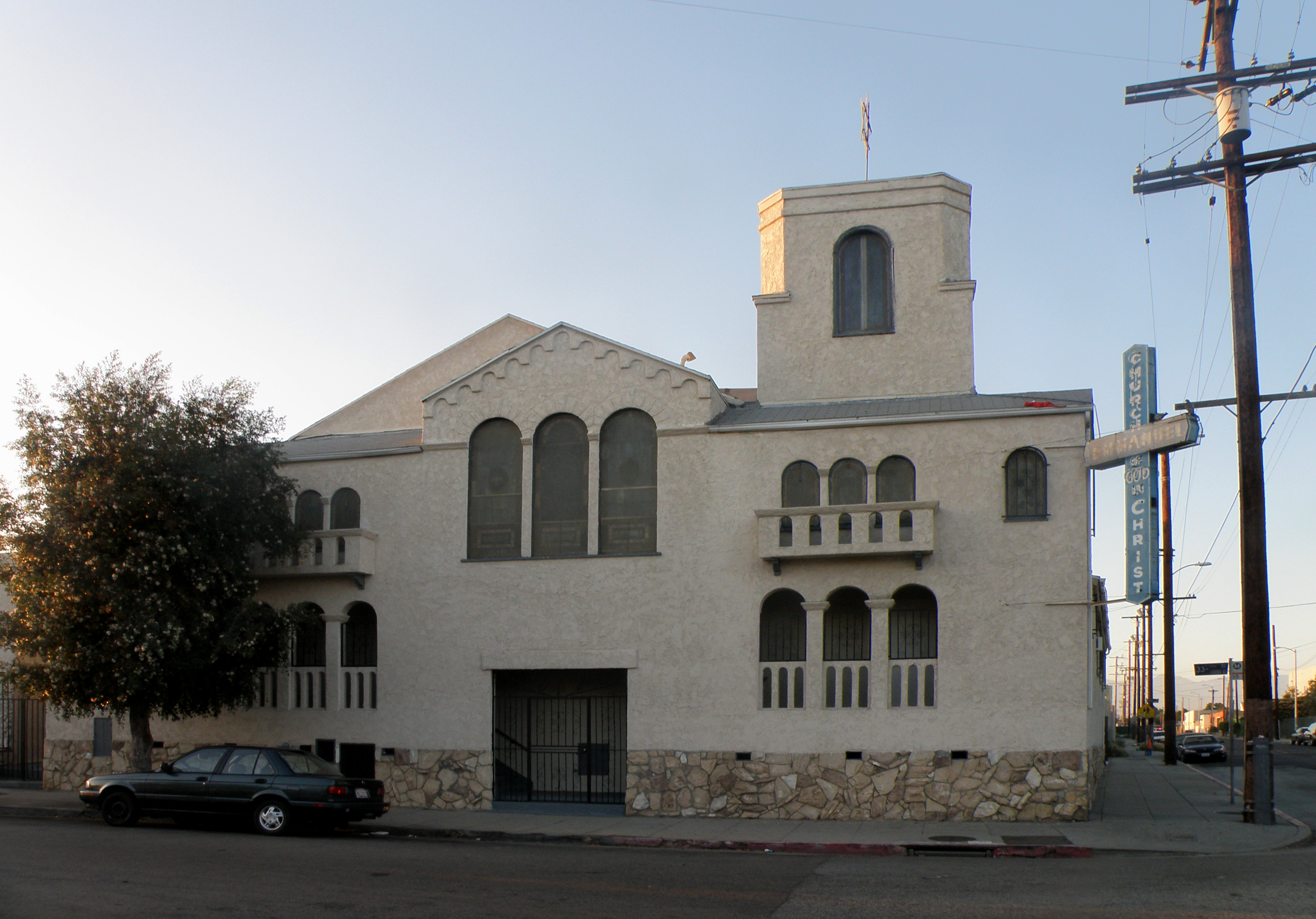
Emmanuel Church of God in Christ.

Nevin is a neighborhood in South Los Angeles, California.

== Geography ==
It consists of the area surrounding the street and school of the same name. Broadly construed, the neighborhood is bounded by Washington Boulevard, Alameda Street, Vernon Avenue and Hooper Avenue.

Nevin is listed as a populated place by the US Geological Survey.

== History ==
The neighborhood, along with Nevin Street and Nevin Street school, were "likely named in memory of Santa Fe Railway manager William G. Nevin".

Nevin Street School opened in 1916.

== Demographics ==
Today the neighborhood is working-class and industrial in nature; most of the housing stock is apartments or multi-family residential. It is one of the poorest and most densely populated areas of Los Angeles.

It has had a succession of ethnicities as dominant in the area. Whites made up most of the first residents. Though the neighborhood, like the rest of South LA, had a predominantly African-American population from about 1930 into the early 21st century, today the population is primarily Hispanic, with a minority of other ethnicities. Next most populous is the African-American minority.

== Education ==
There is one public school in the neighborhood operated by the Los Angeles Unified School District:

- Nevin Street Elementary - 1569 E. 32nd Street.

== Government ==
Nevin is represented by the Central Alameda Neighborhood Council.

== See also ==
- Amoco Junction, Los Angeles
- Historic South Central Los Angeles
