= Washington Senators =

Washington Senators may refer to:

== Politicians ==
- Members of the United States Senate, which convenes in Washington, D.C.
  - United States senators from Washington, senators representing the state of Washington in the United States Senate
- Members of the Washington State Senate, which convenes in Olympia, Washington
- Senator Washington (disambiguation), senators with the surname Washington
- Shadow senator, an official symbolically elected to represent Washington, D.C., in the United States Senate

== Sports ==
=== American football ===
- Washington Senators (NFL), an American football team that played from 1921 to 1922

=== Baseball ===
- Washington Senators (1891–1899) played in the American Association and the National League
- Washington Senators (1912) played in the short-lived United States Baseball League
- Washington Senators (1901–1960), an American League team that became the Minnesota Twins
- Washington Senators (1961–1971), an American League team that became the Texas Rangers
- Washington Nationals (disambiguation), other baseball teams based in Washington, D.C.
