= Palms station (Southern Pacific Railroad) =

Palms
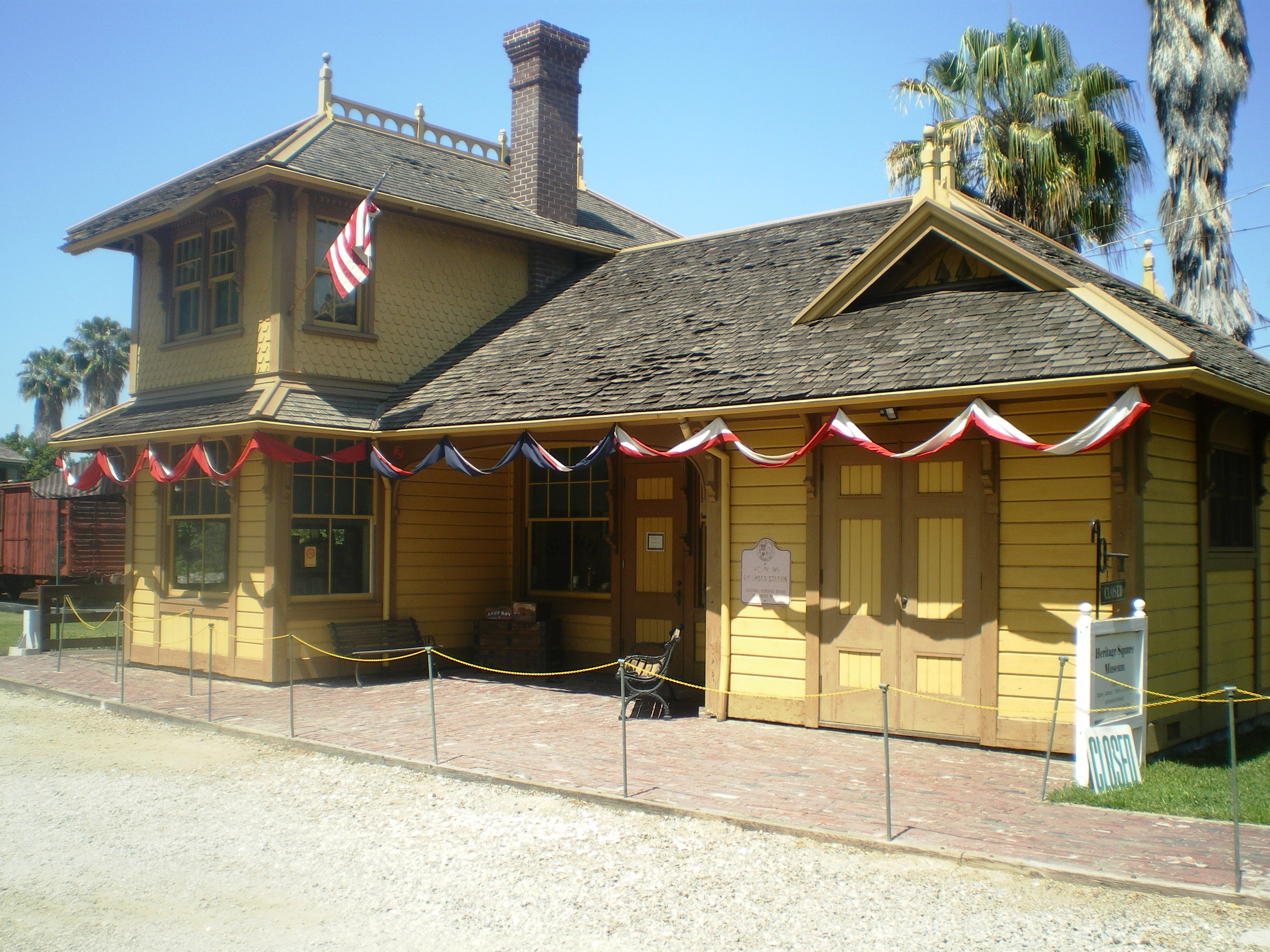
- Palms Depot

History
- Opened: c. 1886–1888

Services
| Preceding station | Southern Pacific Railroad | Following station |
|---|---|---|
| Home Junction toward Port Los Angeles | Santa Monica Branch | Ivy toward River |
| Preceding station | Pacific Electric | Following station |
| Talamantes toward Rustic Canyon | Air Line | Culver Junction toward Pacific Electric Building |
- 34°5′17.5″N 118°12′28.5″W
- Location: Heritage Square, 3800 N. Homer St., Montecito Heights, Los Angeles, California, USA

Site notes
- Governing body: Heritage Square

Los Angeles Historic-Cultural Monument
- Designated: 1963
- Reference no.: 22
Location

Palms-Southern Pacific Railroad Depot is a historic railroad depot built between 1886 and 1888 in what is now the Palms section of Los Angeles, California. The two-story wood depot was originally located at the corner of National Boulevard and Vinton Avenue.

In 1928, an “old-timer” told the Los Angeles Times that decades before the Palms station had been known as “Grasshopper Station” because at the time “grasshoppers were present in veritable clouds.” The Southern Pacific later changed the station's name to “The Palms”, and the surrounding community adopted the name. As one of only two depots on the fifteen-mile route between Los Angeles and Santa Monica (the other being the Ivy station in Culver City), the Palms Depot served as the hub of a growing agricultural community.

From the 1920s to the 1940s, the motion picture business became the dominant business in the Palms-Culver City area, and movie stars, including Clark Gable, could be seen getting off the Red Cars on their way to work at the nearby studios.

In 1953, the Red Car line was shut down, and the depot was abandoned. As the surrounding area became a suburban residential community, the depot became “a symbol of another day and reflective of what has happened to Palms”.

In the early 1960s, the Culver-Palms Boy Scout Troop 49 undertook a beautification of the depot building and used it as a meeting place. The Los Angeles Cultural Heritage Board declared the building to be a Los Angeles Historic-Cultural Monument in 1963; it was the 22nd structure to receive the historic monument designation. Despite the designation, the depot remained vacant, was victimized by vandals and graffiti, and fell into serious disrepair in the early 1970s.

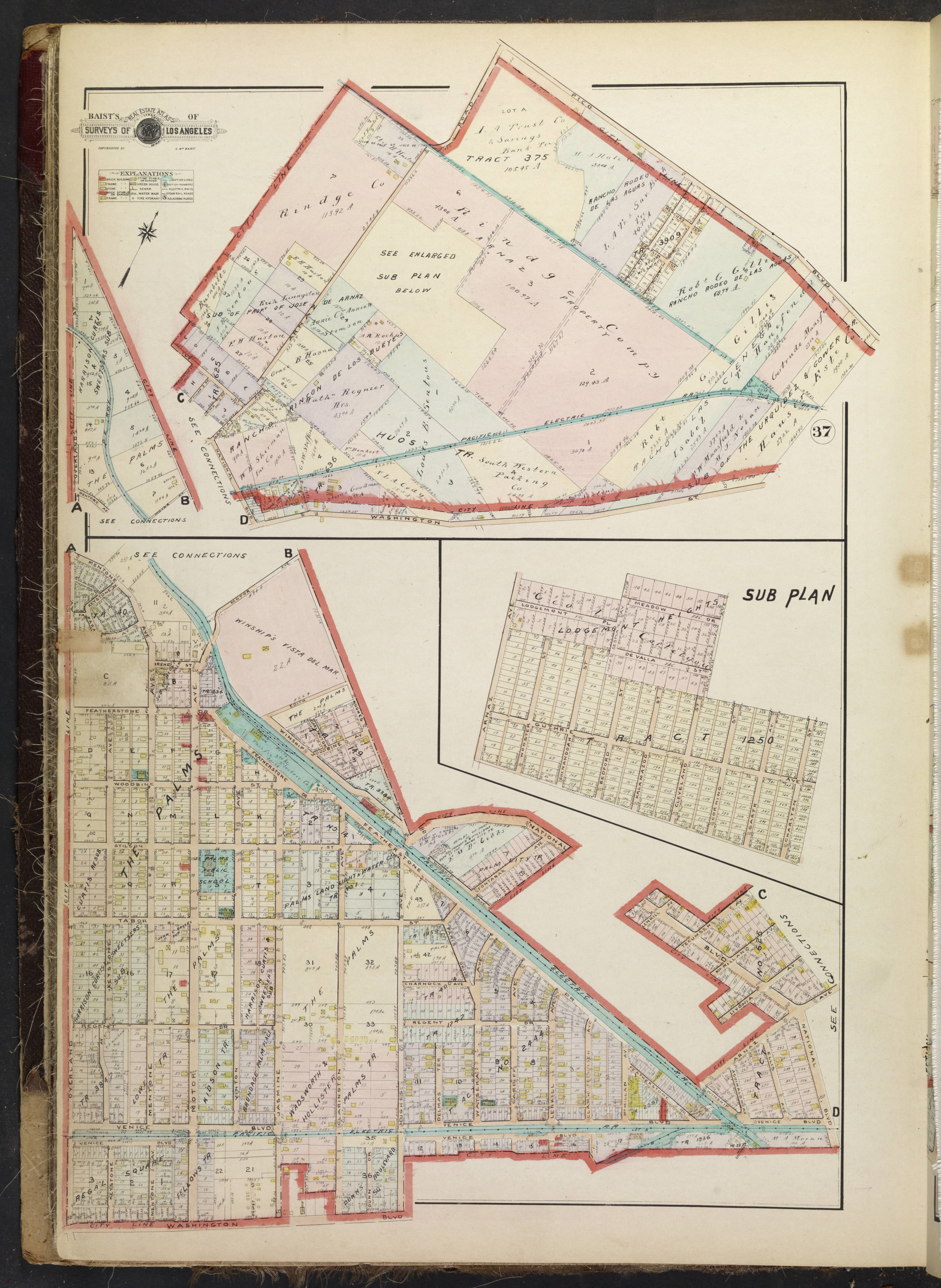
Palms station and neighboring Rancho Park, Los Angeles in 1921

The Los Angeles Fire Department ultimately condemned the structure, but preservationists sought to save it from demolition. In 1976, the Los Angeles Cultural Heritage Foundation raised funds to move the structure to Heritage Square Museum in Montecito Heights. The depot presently sits at the entrance to Heritage Square and houses the museum gift shop.

== See also ==
- Inglewood Depot
- Arcade Depot
- Palms station
