= Washington Internationals =

Washington Internationals or Washington International, may refer to:

== Places ==
- Washington International Hotel, Iloilo, Philippines; a hotel
- Washington International Airport (IATA code: IAD; ICAO code: KIAD), Dulles, Virginia, USA; serving Washington, D.C.
  - Washington Dulles International Airport station (also called "Washington International station"), Washington Metro rapid transit station, Loudon, Virginia, USA; serving the airport

=== Schools ===
- Washington International School, Washington, D.C., USA; a private international school
- Washington International University, British Virgin Islands; an online university

== Sports ==
- Washington Internationals, a basketball team in the ABA minor pro league based in Washington, D.C., USA; see List of former American Basketball Association (2000–present) teams
- Washington Internationals, a soccer team in the United States Soccer Football Association who competed in the 1973 National Challenge Cup

== Other uses ==
- Washington International Horse Show, an annual horse show in Washington, D.C., USA

== See also ==
- Baltimore/Washington International Airport (IATA code: BWI; ICAO code: KBWI), Anne Arundel County, Maryland, USA; serving the Baltimore-Washington Metropolitan Region, in the Baltimore Area
- Washington National Airport (IATA code: DCA; ICAO code: KDCA), Reagan, Virginia, USA; on the Potomac River, serving Washington, D.C.
- Washington Nationals (disambiguation)
- International (disambiguation)
- Washington (disambiguation)
