= Senator Washington =

Senator Washington may refer to:

- Alonzo T. Washington (born 1983), Maryland State Senate
- Barbara Washington (fl. 2010s–2020s), Missouri State Senate
- Craig Washington (born 1941), Texas State Senate
- Harold Washington (1922–1987), Illinois State Senate
- LeAnna Washington (born 1945), Pennsylvania State Senate
- Marcia Washington (born 1953), Nevada State Senate
- Mary L. Washington (born 1962), Maryland State Senate
- Maurice Washington (born 1956), Nevada State Senate
- McKinley Washington Jr. (1936–2022), South Carolina State Senate
- Nat W. Washington (1914–2007), Washington State Senate

== See also ==
- Washington State Senate
- Washington Senators (disambiguation)
