= Culver City station =

Los Angeles Metro Rail station

Culver City
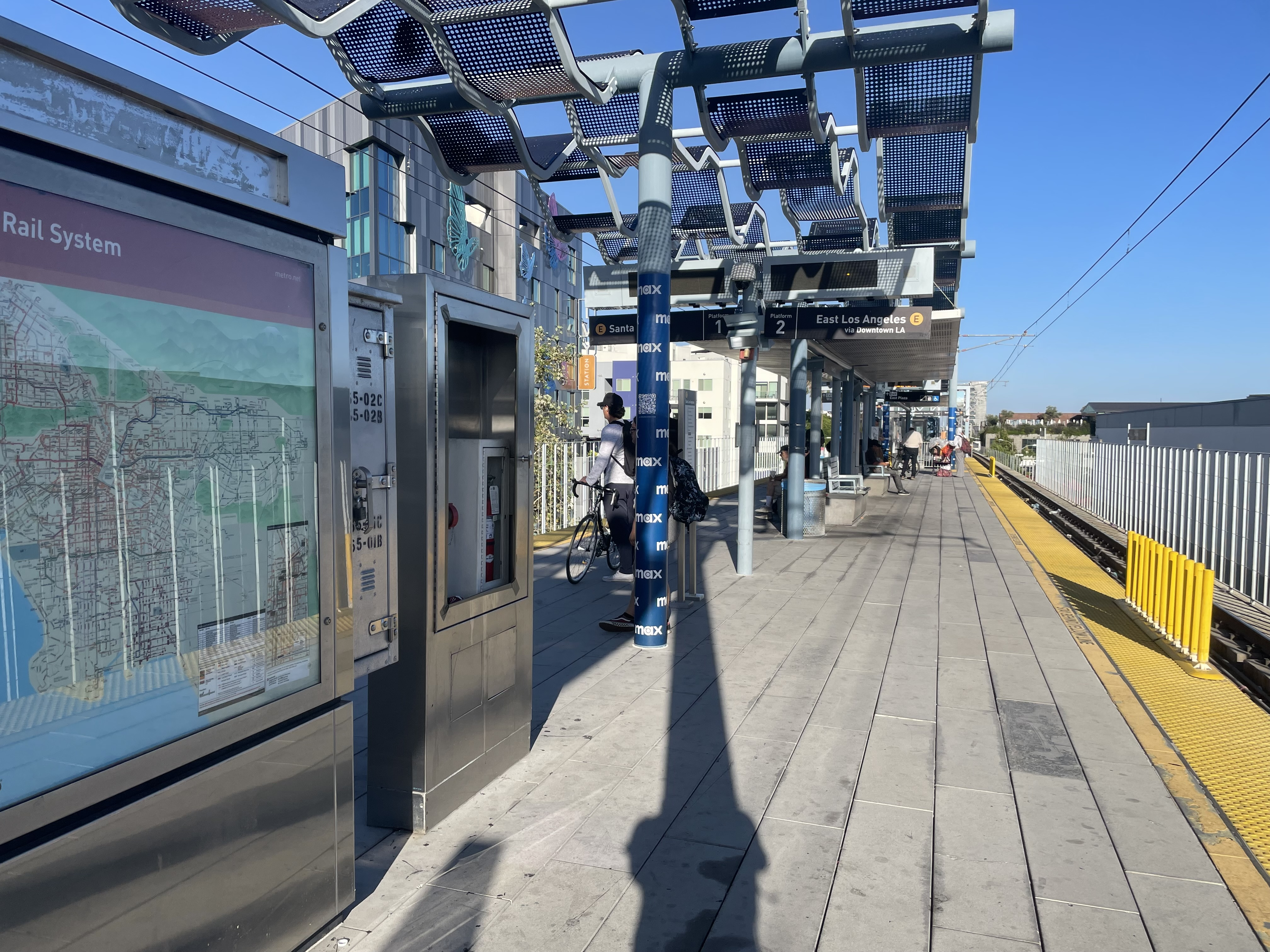
- Culver City station platform, September 2023

General information
- Location: 8817 Washington Boulevard; Culver City, California
- Coordinates: 34.0282°N 118.3883°W
- Owner: Los Angeles County Metropolitan Transportation Authority
- Platforms: 1 island platform
- Tracks: 2
- Connections: Big Blue Bus; Culver CityBus; LADOT Commuter Express; Los Angeles Metro Bus

Construction
- Structure type: Elevated
- Parking: 586 spaces
- Cycle facilities: Metro Bike Hub, racks and lockers
- Accessible: Yes

History
- Opened: October 17, 1875
- Rebuilt: June 20, 2012
- Former names: Culver Junction; Ivy

Passengers
- FY 2026: 2,116 (avg. wkdy boardings)

Services
Preceding station	Metro Rail	Following station
Palms toward Santa Monica	E Line	La Cienega/Jefferson toward East LA
Former services
Preceding station	Pacific Electric	Following station
Palms toward Rustic Canyon	Air Line	Sentous toward Pacific Electric Building
First Street toward Rustic Canyon	Venice Short Line	National Boulevard toward Hill Street
First Street Palms toward Clifton	Redondo Beach via Playa del Rey	National Boulevard toward Hill Street
Location

Culver City station is an elevated light rail station on the E Line of the Los Angeles Metro Rail system. The station is located on a dedicated right-of-way alongside Exposition Boulevard — between the intersection of Venice Boulevard and Robertson Boulevard on the west and the intersection of Washington Boulevard and National Boulevard on the east. The station is located in the city of Culver City, California, after which the station is named.

== Service ==
=== Hours and frequency ===
E Line trains run every day between approximately 4:30 a.m. and 12:30 a.m. Trains operate every ten minutes during peak hours Monday through Friday, every twelve minutes during the daytime on weekdays and all day on weekends after approximately 8 a.m. (with 15 to 20-minute headways early Saturday and Sunday mornings). Night service runs every 20 minutes.

=== Connections ===
As of December 15, 2024, the following connections are available:

- Big Blue Bus (Santa Monica): 17
- Culver CityBus: 1, 1C1, 7
- LADOT Commuter Express: 437
- Los Angeles Metro Bus: 33, 617

== History ==
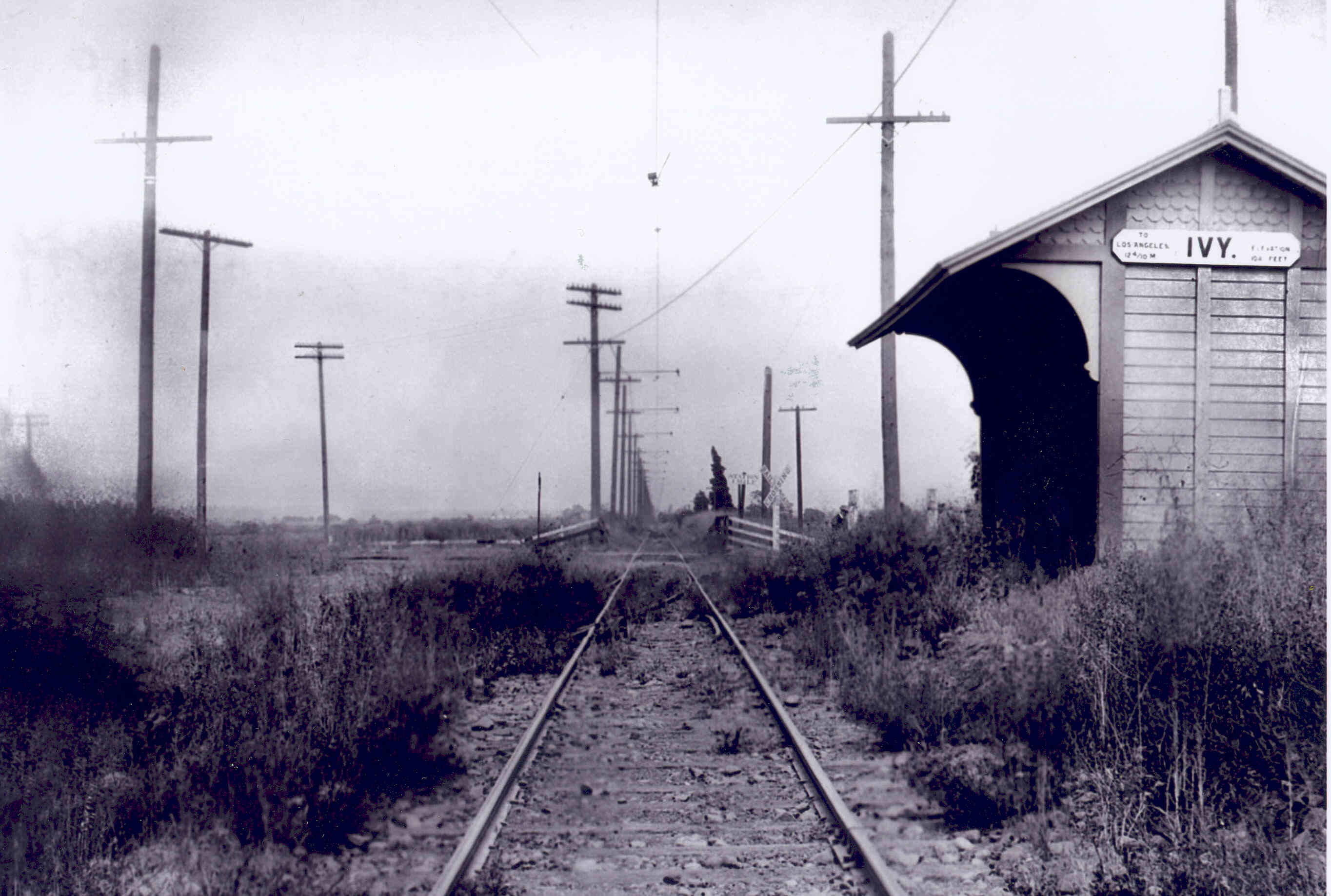
Station location c. 1905

A railway stop known as La Ballona Station, along the Los Angeles and Independence Railway established 1874, was located on or near the site of what came to be known as Ivy Station, Culver Junction, and Culver City station. La Ballona Station was located at what is now Washington Boulevard, which circa 1883 was known as the "Monte Vista and La Ballona Station Road" and which extended Washington Street west from Los Angeles. In 1886, the "surveyors of the Santa Monica Railroad have just crossed the S.P. track at Ballona, just where the county road crossed that track near La Ballona station. The terminus is finally fixed at South Santa Monica, near where the old Juan Bernard wharf is." When the Palms Depot opened in 1887, it was noted to be between La Ballona Station and Santa Monica. The name La Ballona Station was still in use as late as 1893; the name Ivy Station first appears in print in 1889.

Los Angeles-Pacific Railroad built the Venice Short Line through the area in 1903. The interurban railway was grade-separated from the steam railroad via an underpass. When the LAP began running cars over the Santa Monica Air Line in 1908, the tracks were connected to allow interchanges. The junction was later renamed Culver Junction to reflect its new role. In 1915, the station briefly hosted the Culver City branch of the Los Angeles County Free Library.

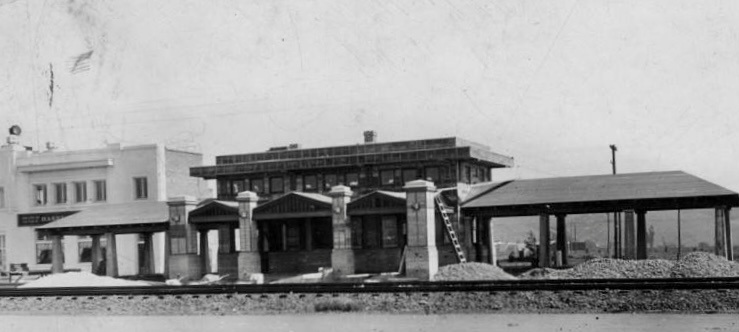
Culver City depot under construction c. 1923

The Venice line closed in September 1950, making it no longer a junction; all passenger service ended on September 30, 1953. The name "Culver Junction" remained on maps, referring to the surrounding area. With service restoration along the corridor in June 2012, the new light rail station was named Culver City.

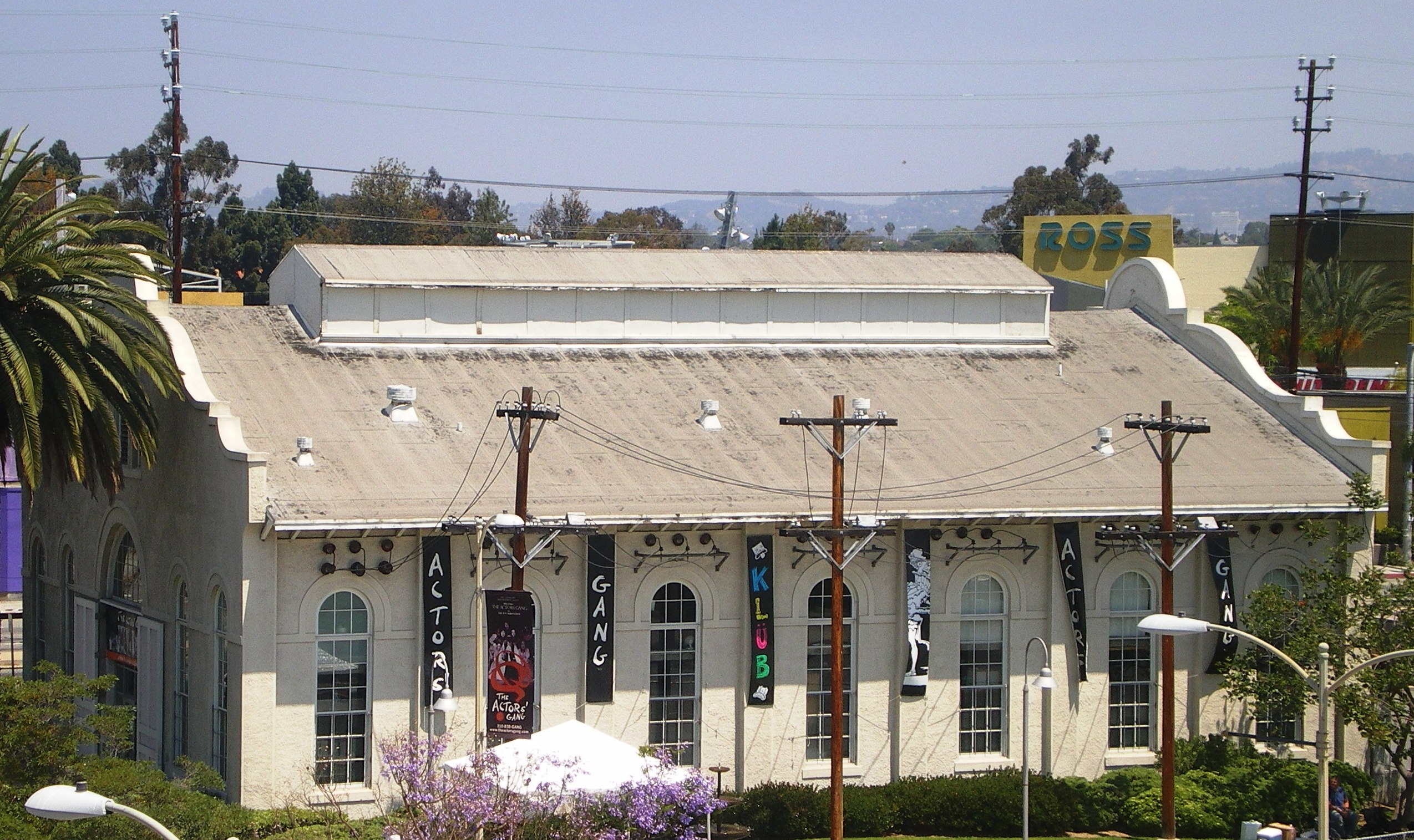
Ivy Substation, former station power building north of the platform

Ivy Substation, a traction substation building which housed mechanical rotary converters used to supply DC current to the line until 1953, is still standing near the station and has been converted into the Actors' Gang Theater. Train power now comes from a much smaller building beneath the elevated platform.

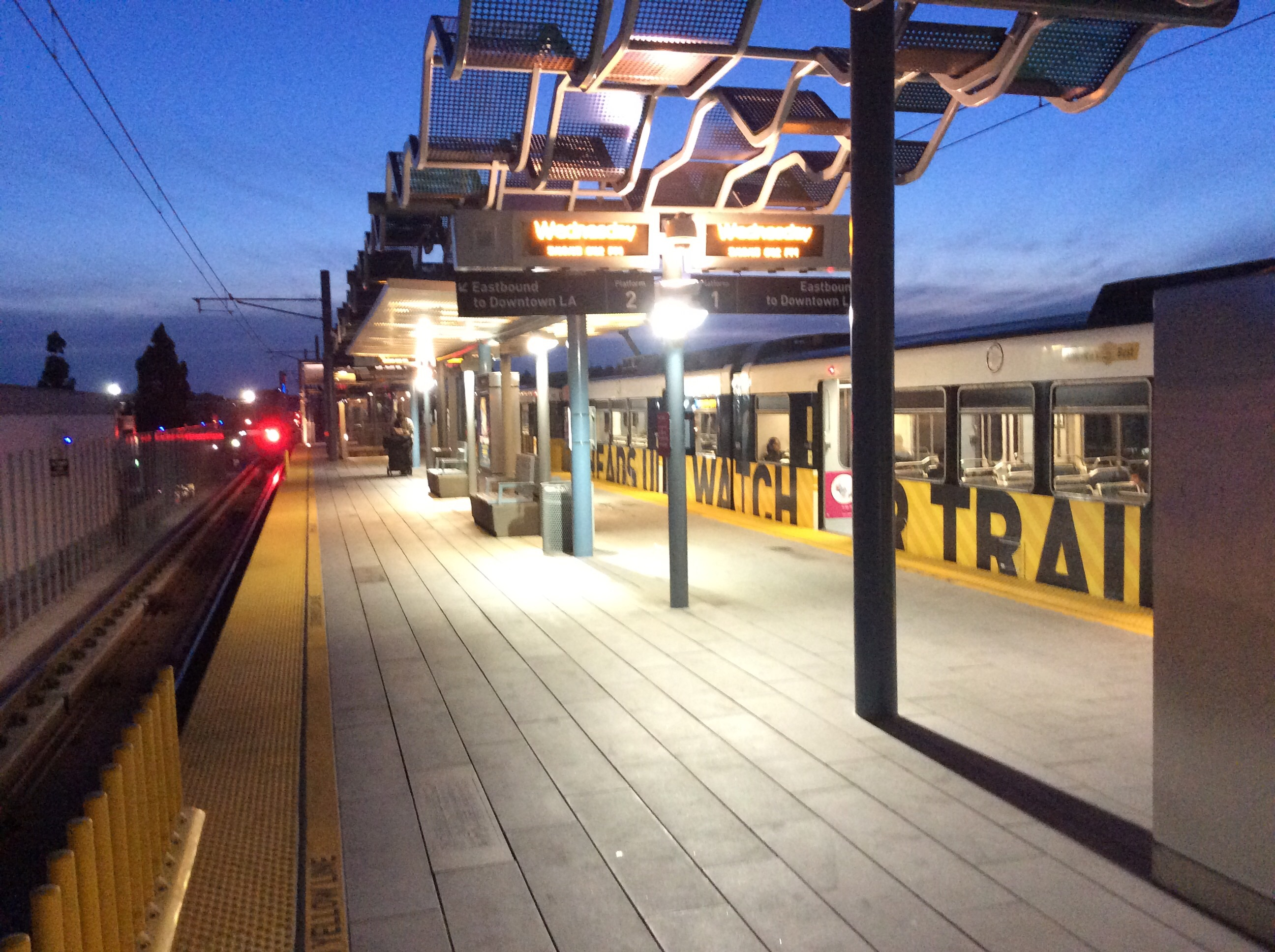
E Line (Los Angeles Metro) platform at Culver City station, 2015

Culver City station served as the initial western terminus of the Expo Line from its re-opening on June 20, 2012. It became a through-station when the remainder of the line to Santa Monica opened on May 20, 2016.

== Notable places nearby ==
At the northeast edge of Downtown Culver City, a major retail, entertainment, and arts district, the station is within walking distance of several notable places:

- Helms Bakery
- Ballona Creek Bike Path
- Culver City Hall
- Hayden Tract
- Museum of Jurassic Technology
- Kirk Douglas Theater
- Ivy Substation (a former power building for this station)
- Ivy Station (apartments, retail, a hotel, and the west coast headquarters of HBO)
- Culver Studios
- Sony Pictures Studios

== Station artwork ==
The station's art was created by artist Tom LaDuke. Entitled Unknowable Origins, the installation depicts softly rendered views of Culver City as seen from surrounding hillside viewpoints, with abstracted face shapes of notable people from Culver City appearing in each panel.
