= Downtown Santa Monica station =

Los Angeles Metro Rail station

Downtown Santa Monica
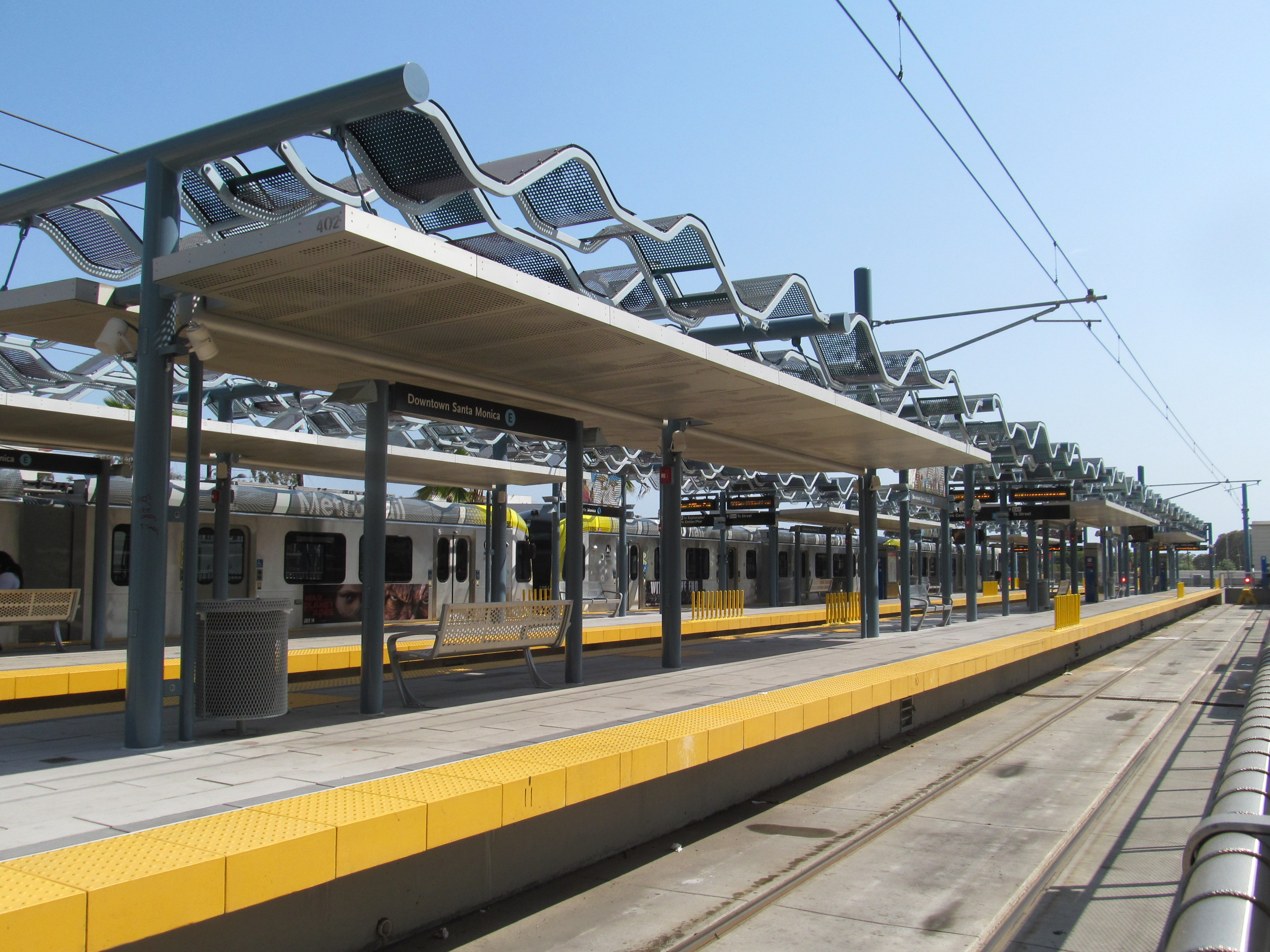
- Downtown Santa Monica station in 2017

General information
- Location: 401 Colorado Avenue; Santa Monica, California
- Coordinates: 34.0138°N 118.4921°W
- Owner: Los Angeles County Metropolitan Transportation Authority
- Platforms: 2 island platforms
- Tracks: 3
- Connections: Amtrak Thruway; Big Blue Bus; Los Angeles Metro Bus

Construction
- Parking: Paid parking nearby, park and ride facility
- Cycle facilities: Metro Bike Share station, and racks
- Accessible: Yes

History
- Opened: October 17, 1875
- Rebuilt: May 20, 2016
- Former names: Tool House; Santa Monica

Passengers
- FY 2025: 4,647 (avg. wkdy boardings)

Services
Preceding station	Metro Rail	Following station
Terminus	E Line	17th Street/SMC toward East LA
Location

Downtown Santa Monica station is an at-grade light rail station in the Los Angeles Metro Rail system. It is located near the intersection of 4th Street and Colorado Avenue in downtown Santa Monica, California. It is the E Line's western terminus.

== Overview ==
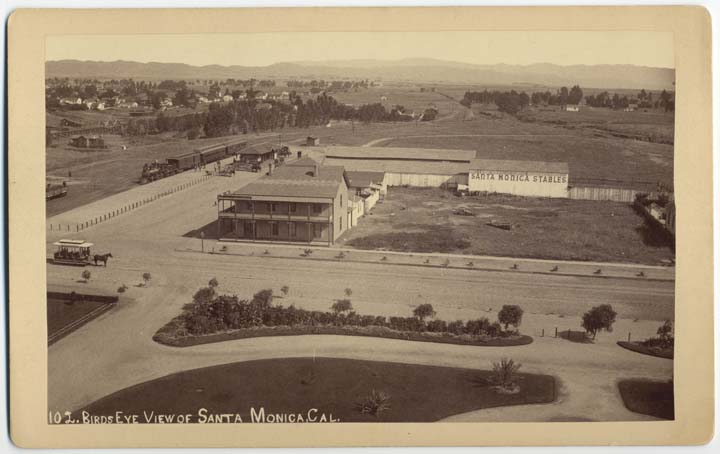
Santa Monica station and a train, 1894

The station is located in Downtown Santa Monica, off-street in the block bounded by 4th and 5th Streets, Colorado Avenue, and the 10 Freeway. The site is located in the midst of Santa Monica's Civic Center. The block was formerly the location of a Sears auto center, which was demolished in 2010 to make way for the station.

A trip from downtown Santa Monica to downtown Los Angeles takes 47 minutes.

Originally opened in 1875 for the Los Angeles and Independence Railroad with subsequent stops along the coast, the station eventually served Pacific Electric passenger and freight service into the 1980's and was completely rebuilt when converted to light rail service.

== Notable places nearby ==
- Pacific Park
- Santa Monica Pier
- Third Street Promenade
- Santa Monica Place
- Santa Monica State Beach
- Civic Auditorium
- Santa Monica High School
- Hilton Santa Monica Hotel & Suites
- Palisades Park

== Service ==
=== Hours and frequency ===
E Line service hours are from approximately 4:30 a.m. and 11:45 p.m daily. Trains operate every 8 minutes during peak hours, Monday to Friday. Trains run every 10 minutes, during midday on weekdays and weekends, from 9:00 a.m. to 7:00 p.m. Night and early morning service is approximately every 20 minutes every day.

=== Connections ===
As of July 30, 2026, the following connections are available:

- Amtrak Thruway: (at 1457 3rd Street) 1C to Van Nuys, Hollywood Burbank Airport, Santa Clarita, and Bakersfield
- Big Blue Bus (Santa Monica): 1, 2, 3, 7, 8, 9, 18 and 43
- Los Angeles Metro Bus: 4, 20 (early AM/late night only), 33, 134, Rapid 720
