= Santa Monica Air Line =

Former train service from Los Angeles to Santa Monica

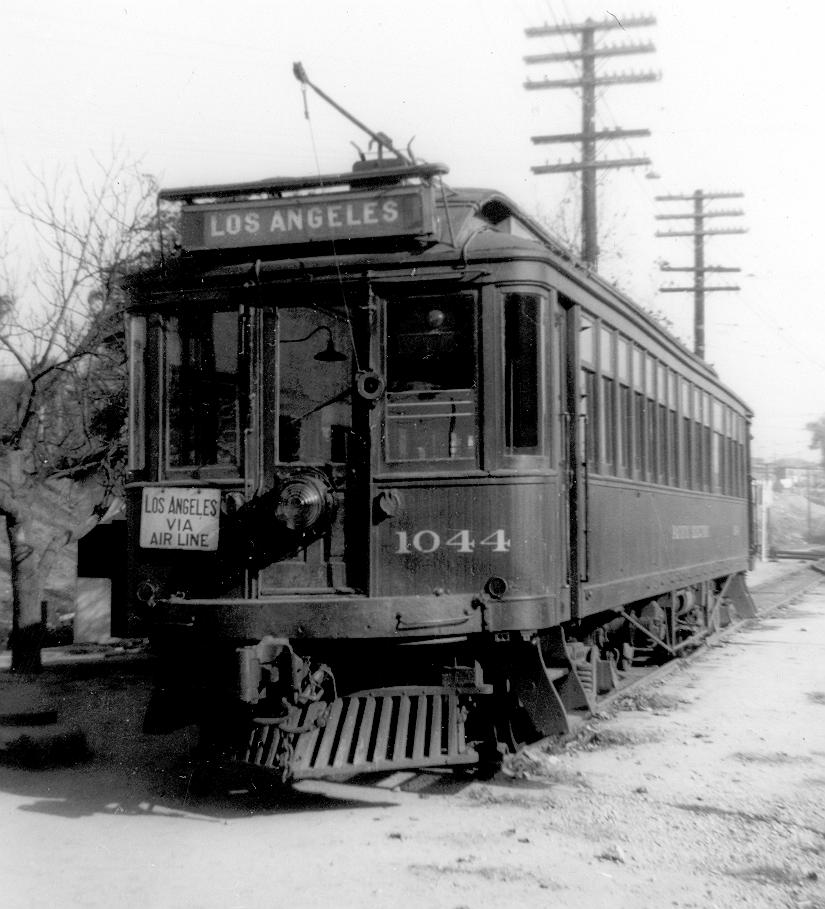
- Car 1044 bound for Los Angeles at the end of the Air Line tracks in Santa Monica, c. 1911.

Overview
- Owner: Southern Pacific Railroad
- Locale: Los Angeles
- Termini: Pacific Electric Building; Santa Monica, California
- Stations: 71

Service
- Type: Interurban
- System: Pacific Electric
- Operator: Pacific Electric
- Daily ridership: 39 (weekdays, 1948)

History
- Opened: July 1908
- Closed: October 26, 1953

Technical
- Line length: 16.88 mi (27.17 km)
- Track gauge: 1,435 mm (4 ft 8 1/2 in) standard gauge
- Electrification: Overhead line, 600 V DC

The Santa Monica Air Line was an interurban railroad operated by the Pacific Electric between Santa Monica and downtown Los Angeles. Electric passenger service operated over the line between 1908 and 1953. After abandonment as a freight railroad, most of the route was converted to light rail for use by the Metro E Line.

== Route ==
=== Los Angeles to Culver Junction ===
Beginning at the Pacific Electric Building at Sixth and Main streets, the line crossed Los Angeles Street on a viaduct to reach San Pedro Street, where it turned south. It turned from San Pedro onto Ninth Street and ran to a right-of-way. At 25th Street and Long Beach Boulevard, at what was called Amoco (American Olive Company) Junction, the Air Line left the Watts main route and went west on a single track right-of-way diagonally across the city grid until Flower Street, where it joined Exposition Boulevard. At the west end of Exposition, the route followed Jefferson Boulevard to La Cienega, where it generally followed Washington and National Boulevards until Culver Junction.

=== Culver Junction to Santa Monica ===
The route turned north until it crossed Overland Avenue, continued on a right-of-way between Exposition and Olympic before reaching Colorado and paralleling that road to Santa Monica. The line curved to the southeast to meet Pico just west of Main Street. It ended south of Main and Hollister at the Ocean Park car house.

The table shows stops on the line in 1911, with major depots in bold:

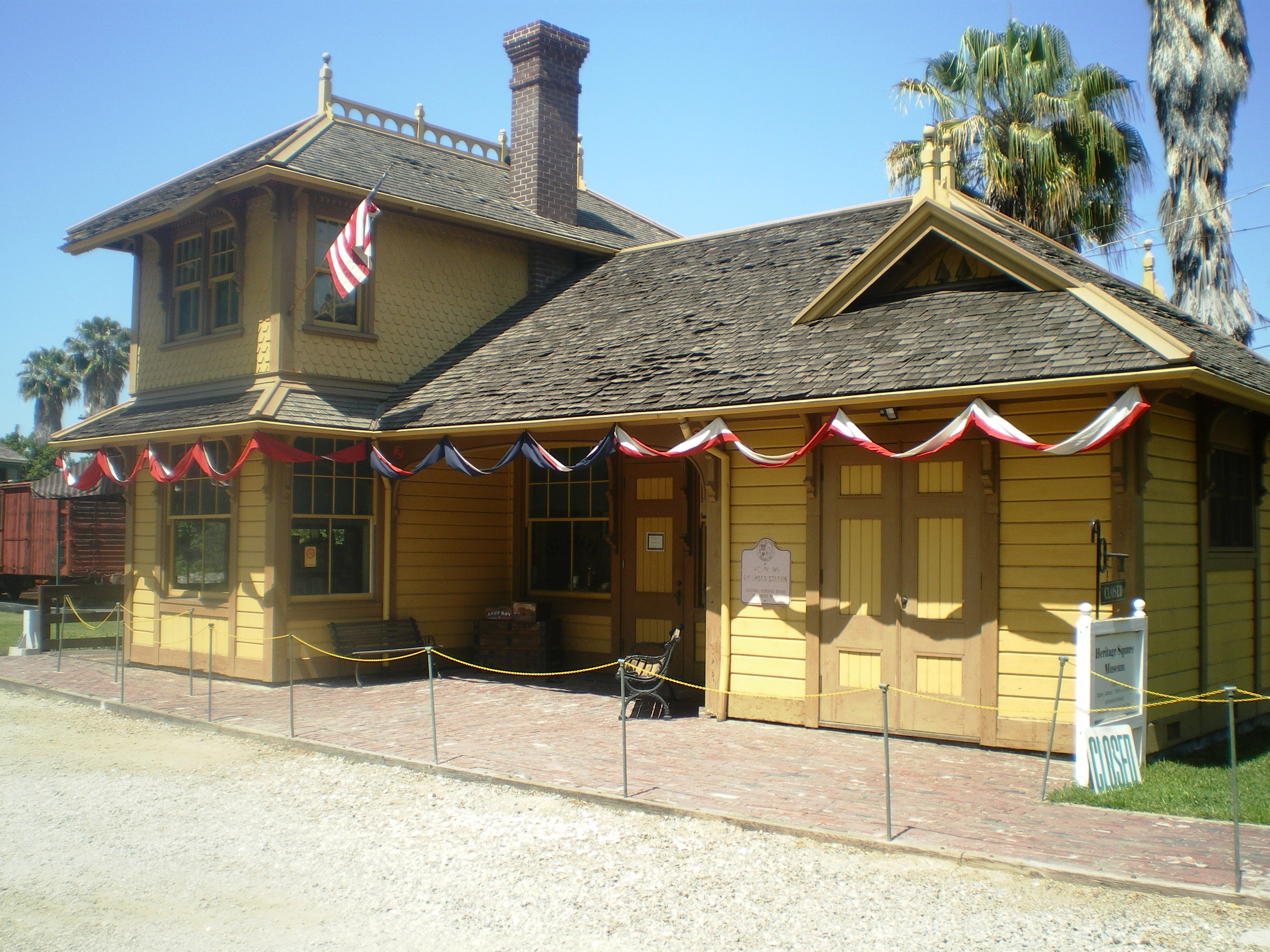
Palms Depot

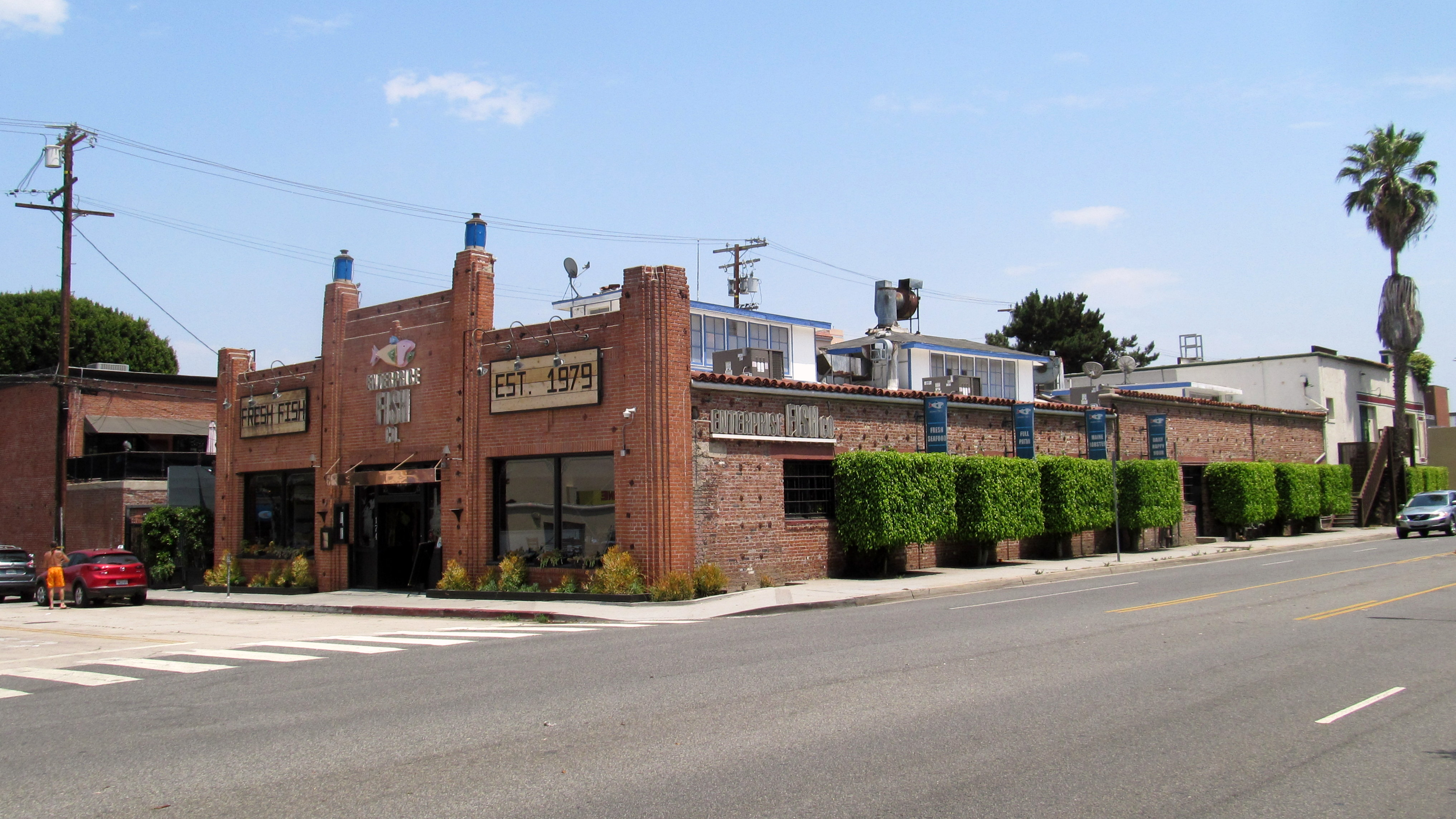
The former Santa Monica transfer station in July 2017. The building served as a transfer point between the standard-gauge and narrow-gauge streetcar lines in the area.

Station	Mile
Los Angeles	0.00
**Nevin**	2.62
Hooper	3.05
San Pedro Street	3.77
Jefferson	4.18
Grand Avenue	4.54
University	5.40
11th Avenue	7.68
Sentous	10.04
**Culver Junction** (Venice Blvd and Culver Blvd)	11.16
The Palms	12.20
**Talamantes**	13.73
Home Junction	14.87
Soldiers' Home	15.87
Bergamot	15.25
Sunset	16.18
Santa Monica	16.88
Tool House	17.54
**Ocean Park**	19.20

== Infrastructure ==
Power for the line's overhead wire was provided by the Ivy Substation at 600 volts direct current until operations were converted to diesel engines shortly after passenger service ended.

== History ==
The line was built in 1875 as the steam-powered Los Angeles and Independence Railroad, intended to bring mined ore to ships in Santa Monica harbor's Long Wharf and as a passenger excursion train to the beach. It was later purchased by Southern Pacific Railroad, whereupon it was leased to the Los Angeles-Pacific Railroad for electric passenger and light freight use.

Installation of the railway electrification system on the line had begun by May 1908, and electric service to the Hill Street Terminal began that July (cars ran to Hill Street via the Venice Short Line). Limited flyer service was inaugurated on May 26, 1909. Pacific Electric bought the line in 1911, along with all the other lines owned by Los Angeles Pacific. Tracks between Culver Junction and Amoco Junction were electrified in 1912, allowing cars to reach downtown via the Watts Line. The Santa Monica harbor Long Wharf was closed to shipping traffic in 1913. By 1923, service consisted of 17 daily round trips to 11th Avenue, 15 round trips to Culver City, and a single daily round trip the full length of the line to Santa Monica.

=== Service decline and end ===
With sparse population along much of the route, service on the Air Line was reduced as early as 1924, with passenger cars running only during rush hours. At that point most passengers traveled to Santa Monica on a different rail line which ran primarily on Santa Monica Boulevard. Pacific Electric would reduce the Air Line's service frequency until 1931 when only a single daily round-trip operated over the route.

The railroad tried to discontinue the service entirely as early as 1932, though patrons of the line successfully blocked every attempt. By then, Pacific Electric did not print regular timetables for the Air Line, attempting to reduce ridership to strengthen their case for abandonment. Fans and users of the service would advertise the trip independently of the company.

Passenger service on the Air Line was discontinued on October 26, 1953. The final few weeks only saw one daily round trip run between Amoco Junction and 11th Avenue. This was Pacific Electric's only service not transferred to Metropolitan Coach Lines, which had happened to their remaining lines 25 days earlier. This marked the railroad's exit from passenger services entirely.

Freight operations continued running over the tracks. Because the Air Line route was also connected to the Santa Monica Boulevard line via tracks on Sepulveda Boulevard, it was the only way for freight trains to reach West Los Angeles, Beverly Hills and Hollywood warehouses (usually at night due to city regulations).

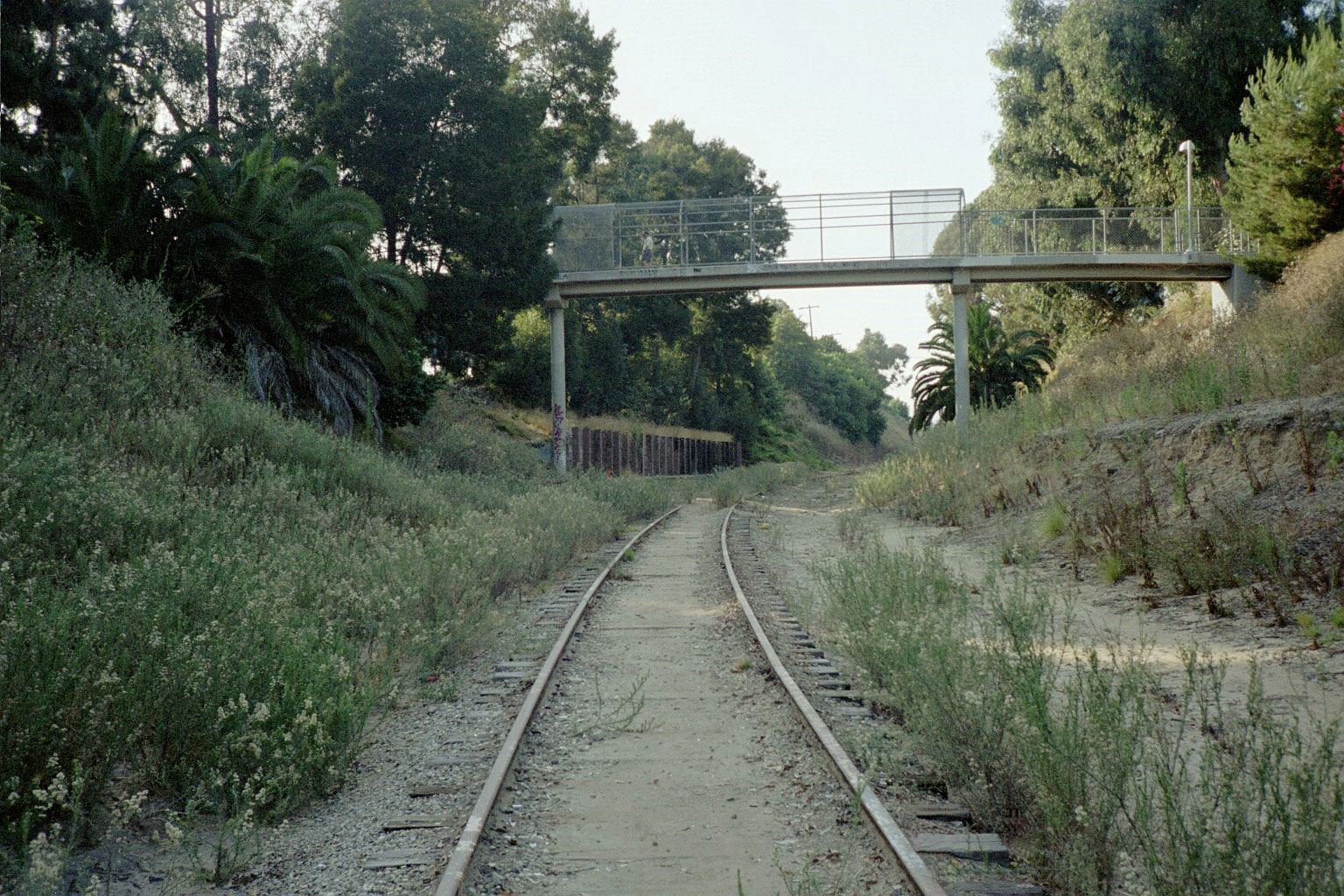
Former Air Line right of way, looking toward northwest, adjacent to Northvale Road (formerly, Exposition Boulevard) near Dunleer Drive. Palms Park is on the left and Northvale Road, which borders Cheviot Hills from the southwest, is on the right side of the right of way. Seen in 2005 prior to conversion to light rail.

As the use of rail for transporting freight gradually declined, the tracks along Santa Monica and Sepulveda boulevards were removed and service became sparse. The tracks alongside Exposition Park occasionally also served a special purpose to hold circus trains throughout the 1980s and to store various companies' passenger cars during the 1984 Olympic Games. The final freight run was from Fisher Lumber in Santa Monica on the morning of Friday, March 11, 1988.

After abandonment, ownership was maintained by Southern Pacific, which leased various portions of the land for semi-permanent structures. By the mid-1990s parking lots, storage facilities and some retail buildings had almost completely covered the tracks west of Sepulveda Boulevard — with unused signal cantilevers and crossing gates being the only clue to its former existence. East of Sepulveda Boulevard, tracks, bridges and tunnels remained intact but overgrown.

A lone Southern Pacific Railroad boxcar was marooned on a freight siding which once serviced a warehouse at 10151 National Boulevard, originally the Great Western Biscuit Company and later the publications division of Douglas Aircraft Company. In 2005 the building was leveled and the boxcar cut apart and removed to make way for Price Self-Storage.

== Replacement ==
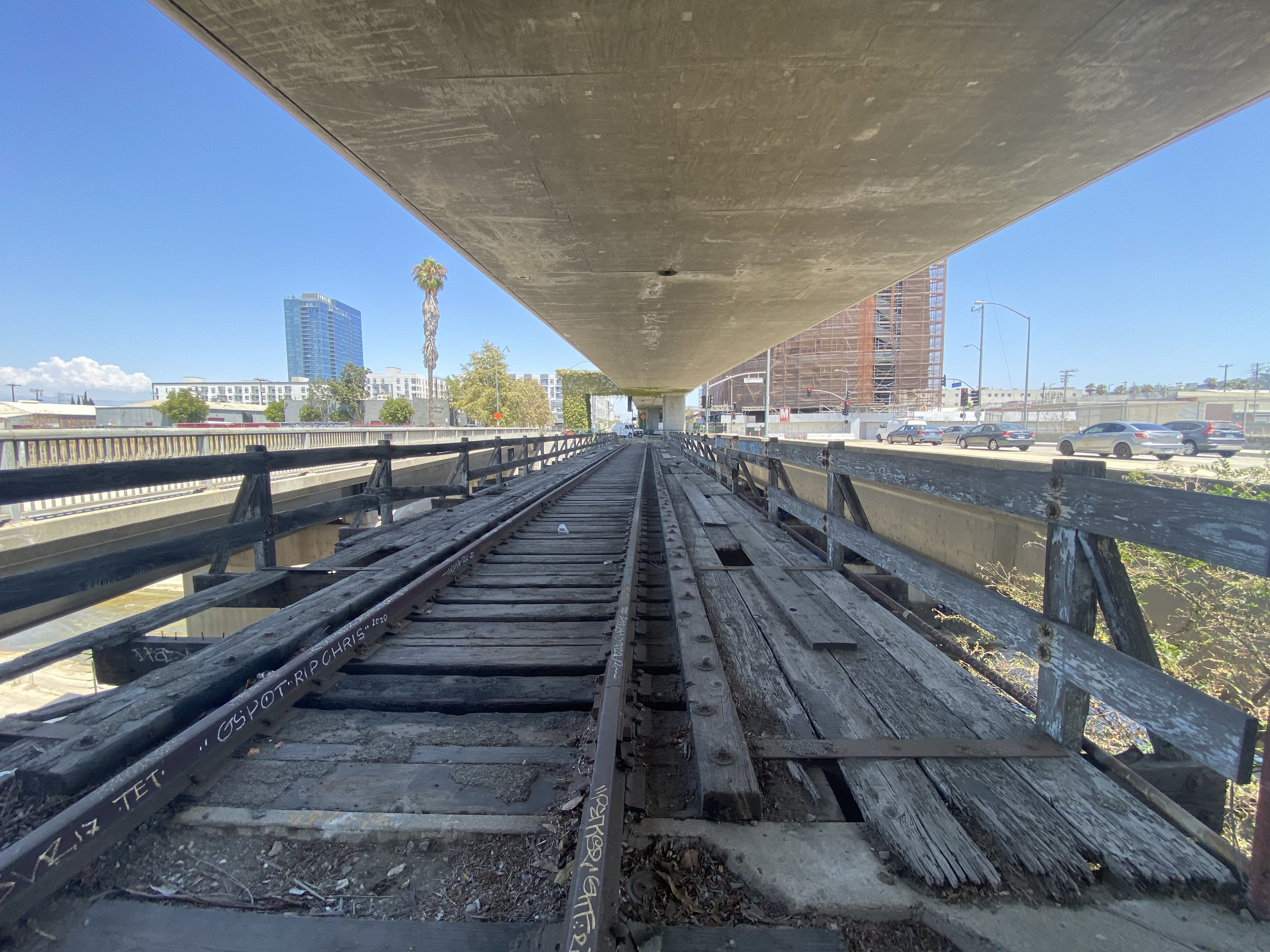
Abandoned Pacific Electric Santa Monica Air Line railway bridge over Ballona Creek, contemporary E Line immediately above

The right-of-way was purchased by what is now Los Angeles Metro in 1990. Track replacement and various construction tasks began in 2006, and the first phase of the "Expo Line" from downtown Los Angeles to Culver City opened in April 2012. Service for the second phase to Santa Monica began on May 20, 2016. The new service had daily ridership of over 58,000 in 2018.

While most parts of the Air Line have been replaced in reconstruction, two major structures from those days remain: (1) The steel bridge over National Boulevard was deemed structurally sound and was repurposed in conjunction with a new bridge for a second track, and (2) the tunnel under the Santa Monica Freeway was put back in use.

== Branch lines ==
=== Soldiers' Home branch ===
A branch of the Air Line ran 2.14 miles (3.44 km) from Home Junction to the Sawtelle Veterans Home. It was built in 1893 and similarly upgraded for electric service in 1908, also being absorbed into the new Pacific Electric. It operated as a shuttle service until about July 1920.

=== Port Los Angeles Line ===
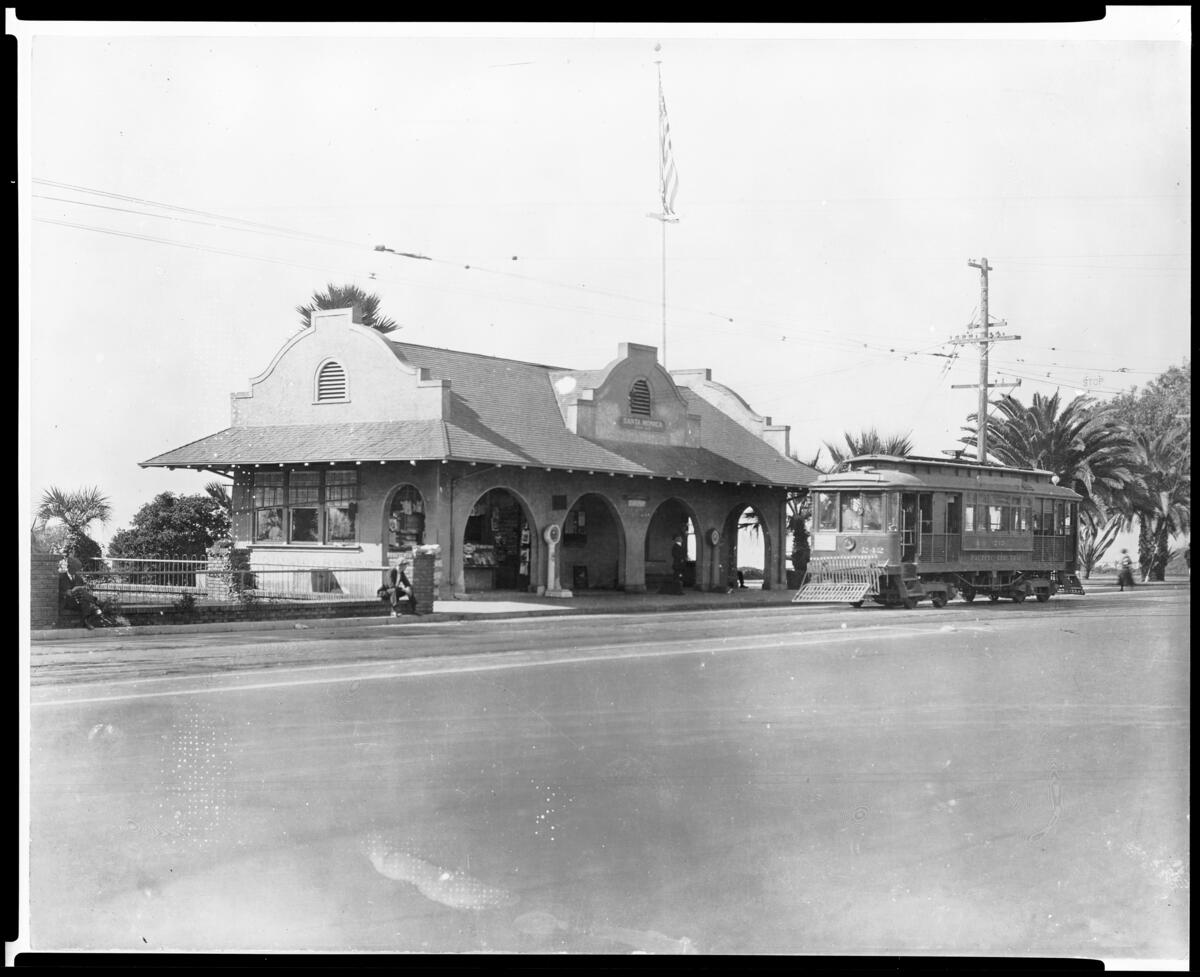
Santa Monica station

As a remnant of Southern Pacific's former steam line, the segment from Santa Monica to Port Los Angeles ran a regular local service. Pacific Electric began with half-hourly headways and some inbound trips initially ran as far as Culver City. The Port terminal was truncated to Rustic, near the pier approach, around 1920, and again to Santa Monica Canyon around 1924. By November 1931, frequency was reduced to two round trips daily and the service was discontinued outright between 1933 and 1934.

== See also ==
- Streetcars in North America
- List of California railroads
- History of rail transportation in California
