= Los Angeles and Independence Railroad =

Former train service from Los Angeles to Santa Monica

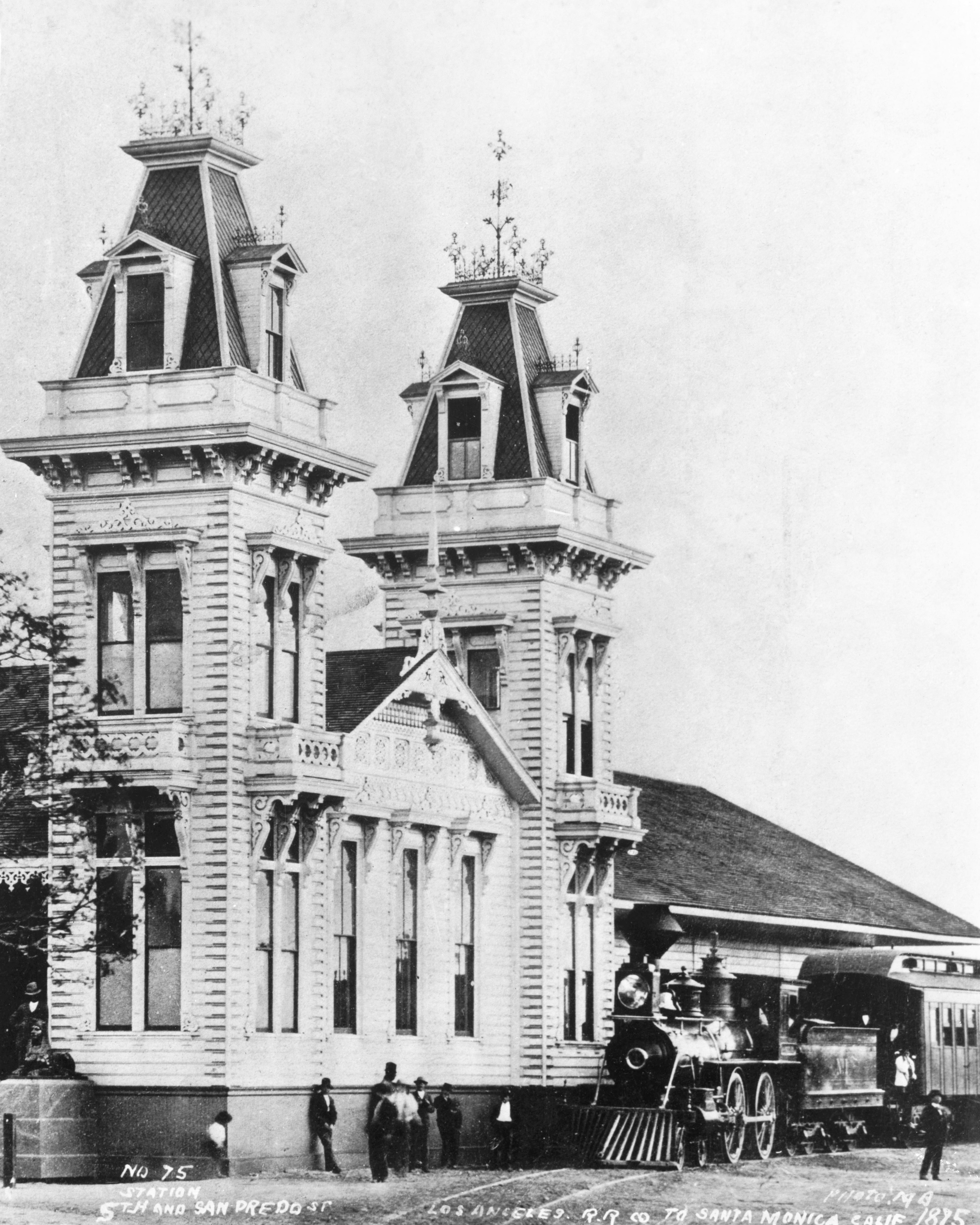

Overview
- Headquarters: Los Angeles, CA
- Locale: Santa Monica to Los Angeles
- Dates of operation: 1875–1877
- Successor: Santa Monica Air Line

Technical
- Track gauge: 4 ft 8 in (1,422 mm)
- Length: 16.67 miles (26.83 km)

The Los Angeles and Independence Railroad, opened on October 17, 1875, was a steam-powered rail line which ran between the Santa Monica Long Wharf (north of the current Santa Monica Pier) and 5th and San Pedro streets in downtown Los Angeles.

Intended to eventually reach San Bernardino (San Bernardino County) and Independence (Inyo County) via Cajon Pass to serve the Cerro Gordo Silver Mines near Panamint, the line was never extended past downtown Los Angeles and was eventually acquired by Southern Pacific Railroad.

The right-of-way was purchased by what is now the Los Angeles County Metropolitan Transportation Authority in 1990. In 2012, the Expo Line light rail line opened largely using the right-of-way.

== History ==
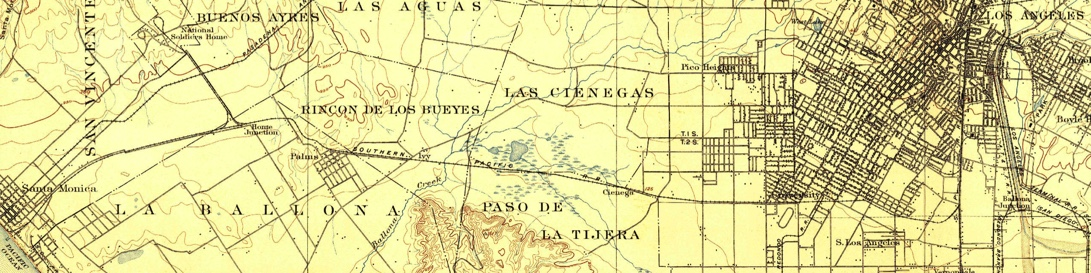
Route map, 1894

=== Need for a railroad to Inyo mines established ===
In the early 1870s, the new Cerro Gordo in the Owens Valley area of Inyo County, California were producing a considerable amount of silver. In order for it to be shipped to San Francisco, the bullion was first transported by freight wagons to Los Angeles, loaded onto the Southern Pacific Railroad, and transported to Wilmington where it was finally loaded onto steamers headed to San Francisco. Supplies were likewise sent from Los Angeles by freight wagons northward to the Owens Valley mining regions. This trade resulted in considerable prosperity for Los Angeles.

The threat of possible competition over this freight traffic led Los Angeles civic leaders to consider a rail line to the area, to guarantee the continued profitable mining business. As early as 1872, the possibility of a railroad from Los Angeles to the Inyo mines was discussed in the press. Finally, on March 28, 1874, the state of California granted former governor John G. Downey and banker and businessman F.P.F Temple a charter to construct a narrow-gauge railroad from Los Angeles to Independence in order to more efficiently transport freight to and from the area.

The directors included men from both Los Angeles and Inyo counties. Directors from Los Angeles included Temple as President, Downey as Treasurer, and Benjamin D. Wilson. Inyo Directors included M.W. Belshaw, Victor Beaudry, James Brady, and Pat Reddy, all of whom had interests in the Cerro Gordo mines.

The Southern Pacific, alarmed at possible competition, tried to persuade the governor to veto the charter, but a newly formed Los Angeles Area Chamber of Commerce intervened and the charter was approved.

On May 16, Temple hired Joseph U. Crawford as head engineer, a position Crawford had held when working for Thomas A. Scott's Texas and Pacific Railway. Temple assigned him to find a practical route from Los Angeles through the Cajon Pass to the mining districts, and then to Independence, California. Crawford began surveying on May 24, and in late June submitted his report to the directors, describing the various routes the railroad could take.

At that same time the directors began to solicit local financial support for the railroad's construction, a process that took place over several months. Local support, however, was difficult to come by.

=== Railroad becomes more likely ===
Crawford's report may have caught the attention of Nevada Senator John P. Jones, Comstock millionaire and operator of silver mines at Panamint, California, also in the Owens Valley. Jones, seeing the value in a railroad to transport his mines' silver to Los Angeles, traveled there in September 1874 and subscribed $220,000 to the cost of the railroad, calling upon others to make up the remaining projected cost. Crawford was then sent to start actual surveys for the planned line.

Later, in December, Jones and Robert S. Baker, owner of Rancho San Vicente and Rancho Santa Monica y San Vicente, were added as directors to the proposed line. At the end of December, it was rumored that Jones and Baker had formed a partnership.

Jones's subscription enabled the proposed railroad company to be organized, and on January 2, 1875, articles of incorporation for the Los Angeles and Independence Railroad (L.A. & I.) were submitted to the state. Jones was made President, Temple became Treasurer, San Franciscan James A. Pritchard was Secretary, and Baker, Trenor W. Park, J. S. Slauson, and J. U. Crawford were directors.

On January 4, Jones' and Baker's plan to develop a new seaside community was also announced. Jones had paid $162,500 for a three-quarters interest in the ranchos, and intended to develop a township he and Baker called Santa Monica. Additionally, Jones announced that a wharf would be built there, and that standard-gauge rails would be extended from Los Angeles to his new development rather than the narrow-gauge rails the original directors had considered.

These new developments alarmed SP management. The Southern Pacific was building a line through the Los Angeles area that would make the city part of its southern transcontinental railroad route, something Los Angeles elites desperately wanted. SP management again tried to derail the competitive line, attempting to persuade Congress to amend the Southern Pacific's original charter in a way that would have left Los Angeles off the main line. This effort also failed.

In the meantime, Crawford left to begin grading in Cajon Pass. A line through this pass was necessary for any route to the Inyo mining territories, and there was room for only one rail line. The route through the pass was part of L.A. & I.'s original charter, and the Southern Pacific sought to be the first to survey it in order to block the upstart line. On January 9, 1875, in what became known as the "Battle of the Pass", Crawford and 100 Chinese laborers brought in from Northern California beat the Southern Pacific construction crew to the Cajon Pass and began staking out a route, securing its use for the L.A. & I. The workmen also began to dig a 3,700-foot tunnel at the crest of the pass.

A right-of-way between Santa Monica and the Los Angeles city limit was provided by local ranchers, anxious to have access to a railroad, for nominal sums. The right-of-way within the Los Angeles city limits was granted on July 14, 1875, for approximately $4,075. Land for the Los Angeles station was procured in September 1875 after a somewhat lengthy deliberative process by the Los Angeles Common Council. Once the location was secured, the station was built at San Pedro Street and Wolfskill (4th Street).

=== Construction ===
Grading and construction of the wharf began on February 24 at Santa Monica at "Shoo Fly Landing", at the foot of what is now Colorado Boulevard. The 1,740-foot-long wharf needed to be completed quickly so that the company could receive rails, iron, ties, and other supplies needed for construction without relying on any Southern Pacific facilities.

In late February, Jones went east to secure rails, iron, and rolling stock. In mid-March, Jones contacted Jay Gould, proposing that the road be extended through Nevada to a point in Utah on Gould's Union Pacific Railroad, thereby creating a transcontinental line in competition with the Central Pacific/Southern Pacific lines.

Over several months, additional stock was subscribed during a series of meetings in Los Angeles and surrounding towns until a total of $260,000 was pledged over the amount pledged by Senator Jones.

In March 1875, the Southern Pacific completed a line to Caliente in the southern San Joaquin Valley, just outside of Bakersfield, and a wagon road was constructed to the silver mines. This enabled the SP to become a factor in the mining region's freight traffic, as wagons would bring the bullion to Caliente for transport north to San Francisco. As of May 1, freight transport owner Remi Nadeau now used this route to connect with the SP at Caliente station. Even with this change, however, there was only a relatively small drop in the freight business going to and from Los Angeles.

In July the wharf was completed, and during that month railroad crews began receiving construction materials. In August, grading on the east side of the Los Angeles River started, and by the end of August, track was being laid from Santa Monica.

=== Setbacks ===
As construction proceeded, unsettling events occurred. By August 1875, stock prices of the Nevada Comstock silver mines had risen to unsustainable heights and then crashed. This caused the failure of San Francisco's Bank of California, which closed on August 26. Though this did not immediately affect Jones' finances, it caused a run on banks in Los Angeles, including the Temple and Workman bank. Temple was able to keep his bank open through the end of 1875 with the help of others, but it finally closed on January 13, 1876. The bank's difficulties led to a loss of financial support for the road.

This was enough to cause construction east of Los Angeles to stop in early September, including work in Cajon Pass and on a tunnel in the area. Secretary Pritchard resigned, and Colonel James G. Jackson was appointed general manager of the line.

Part of the line was tested on October 17, 1875. Passengers were taken aboard covered flat cars to the Cienega stop by hack (carriage), and then transported by rail to Santa Monica. At the end of the day, passengers took the rail line back to the Cienega station and then took hacks to Los Angeles.

Final rails were laid and the Los Angeles depot was completed November 27, and the line opened formally on December 1, 1875, now running only from Santa Monica to Los Angeles.

Two trains a day were scheduled between Santa Monica and Los Angeles, with an excursion train on Sundays. The Southern Pacific, which on October 1 had reduced freight rates on their Wilmington line from $5.50 a ton to $2.50 and passenger rates to $0.50, now reduced freight rates further to $1.00 a ton. L.A. & I. rates were set at $1.00 per ton for freight and $1.00 per trip for passengers.

The new line operated under difficult conditions. The Southern Pacific's rate changes made life easier for shippers in Los Angeles but made it difficult for the new line to turn a profit. Some ship captains traveling to Los Angeles would stop at whatever port suited their own needs regardless of the uncertainty and extra travel it caused their passengers. In addition, the Southern Pacific persuaded many current customers to continue shipping to Wilmington. In spring of 1876, Wilmington was still handling twice as much business as Santa Monica.

The L.A. & I. was further handicapped in that it could only deliver freight from Santa Monica to Los Angeles, but no further. Firms shipping via Wilmington could have their freight shipped on the SP to any point within its local rail system.

On September 6, 1876, the Southern Pacific completed their line connecting Los Angeles to its transcontinental route. This disadvantaged the L.A. & I. even further, as freight landing at Wilmington could now be transported anywhere within the SP system.

Finally, problems with the Cerro Gordo mines and the depletion and closure of Jones' Panamint silver mines in May 1877 caused enough difficulty for Jones that he decided to sell.

After offering to sell the line to Los Angeles County, Jones finally sold it to the Southern Pacific for $100,000 cash, $25,000 in a note, and $70,000 in SP stock. On July 4, 1877, the young steam line was transferred to the Southern Pacific.

In September 1878, the Southern Pacific inspected the Santa Monica wharf and, after alleging that it was beyond repair, demolished most of it in 1879. This allowed them to concentrate all freight traffic on their Wilmington port facilities. By November 26, 1878, the line was no longer listed separately but appeared only in Southern Pacific timetables.

=== After the SP acquisition ===
The Southern Pacific extended the existing tracks in 1891 to their new Long Wharf north of Santa Monica Canyon to allow access to larger ships. This wharf allowed ship-to-shore offloading, making the line a freight and passenger hauler of growing importance. However, the U.S. Government's 1899 decision to build a breakwater in San Pedro and create the Port of Los Angeles effectively doomed the natural harbors of Redondo Beach and Santa Monica for commercial shipping traffic.

With the Port of Los Angeles nearing completion in 1908 and Santa Monica shipping traffic ceasing, the Southern Pacific leased the railroad line and Santa Monica wharf to Los Angeles Pacific Railroad (a forerunner of the Pacific Electric), which electrified the portion between the long wharf and Sentous (La Cienega) that year. The remainder of the line was electrified by 1911 when various electric railroads merged under the Pacific Electric name. In 1912, Moving Picture World reported that the old Southern Pacific passenger depot at Santa Monica had been leased by the Bison Company and would be remodeled and converted into business offices and dressing rooms. The wharf was demolished in 1913.

== Locomotives ==
Number	Wheel Arrangement	Builder	Builder Number	Date Built	SP Number	Disposition
1	4-4-0	Danforth, Cooke & Company	1004	1875	1170	Sold in 1896 to Ventura & Ojai Valley #1
2	4-4-0	Danforth, Cooke & Company	1005	1875	1171	Sold in 1896 to Ventura & Ojai Valley #2

== Santa Monica Air Line ==
By 1920 the line was known as the Santa Monica Air Line of the Pacific Electric Railway, providing electric freight and passenger service between Los Angeles and Santa Monica.

== E Line (Los Angeles Metro) ==
The line was subsequently purchased from Southern Pacific for use as a light rail line, which began operation in 2012.

== Legacy ==
From 2015 to 2023, a Santa Monica restaurant named after the railroad operated under the name The Independence. It offered drinks named after the station stops and hosted a 140th anniversary party for the steam line.

== Gallery ==
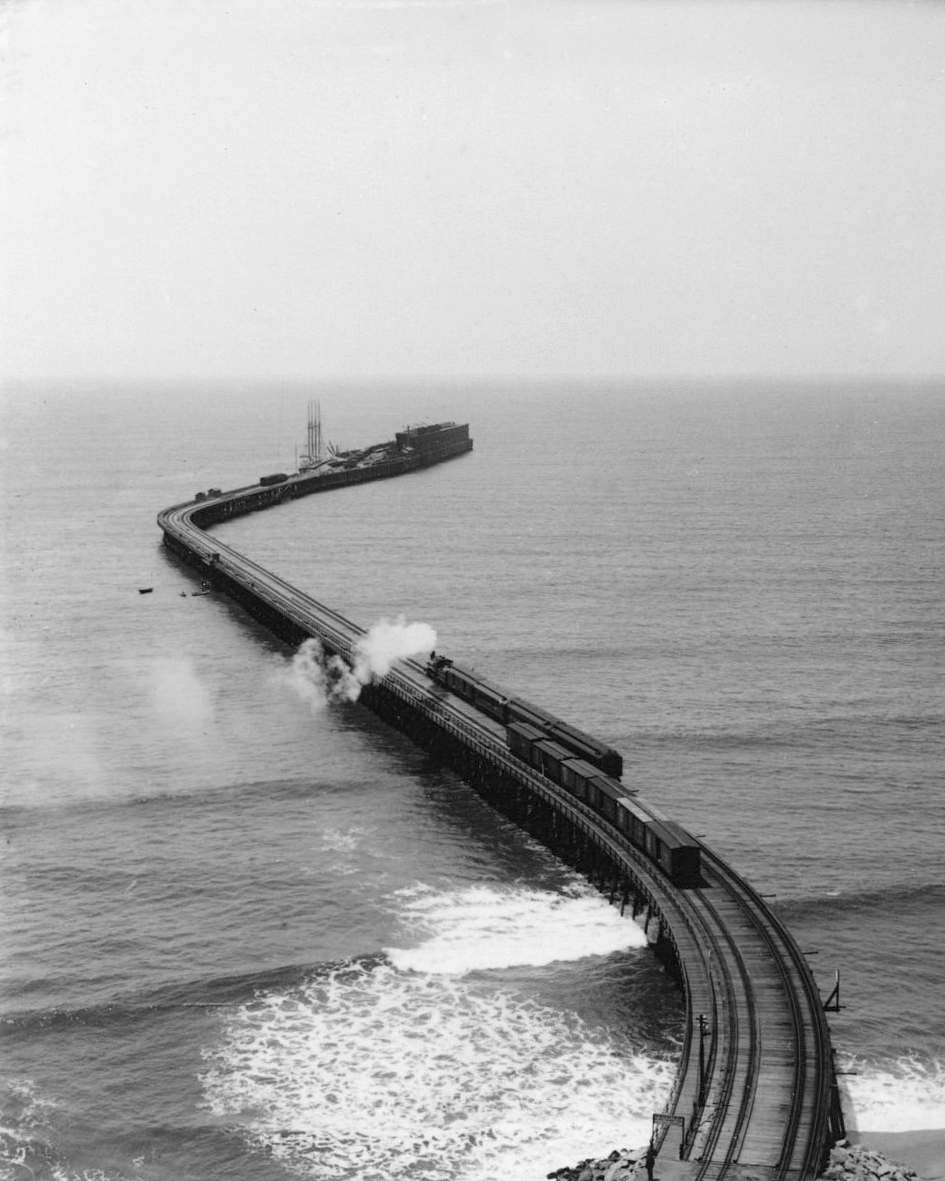
Train on long wharf after SP acquisition, c. 1890

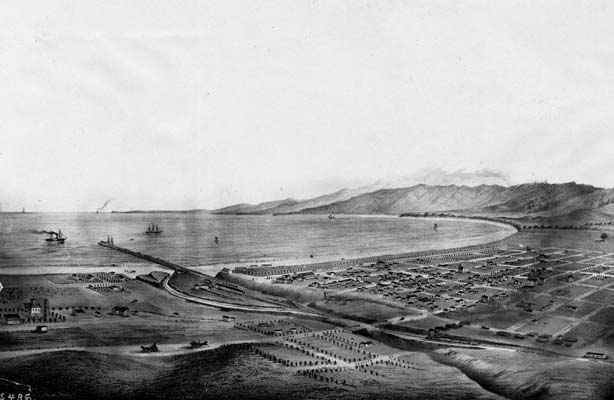
Aerial view of the western portion of the line in Santa Monica, 1875

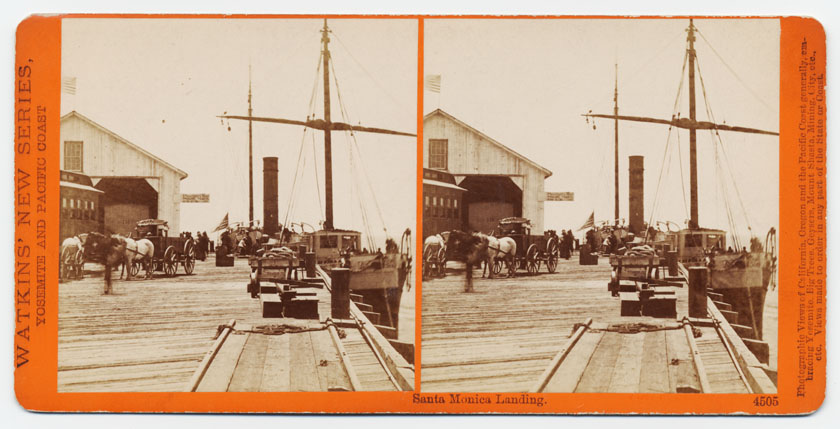
Terminus at the Santa Monica Landing, 1877

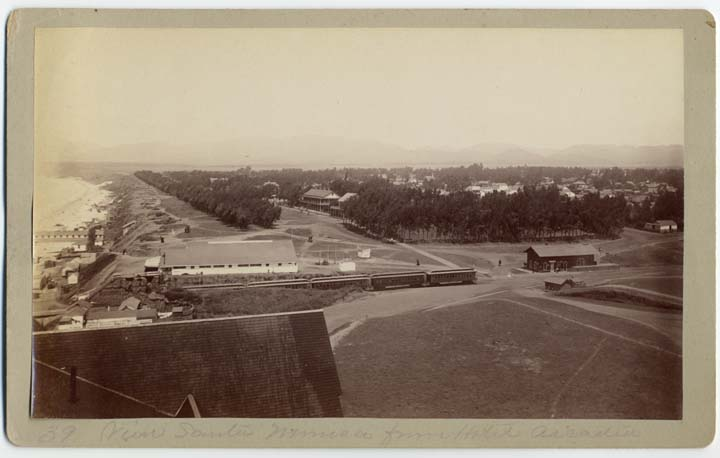
Santa Monica station, 1887

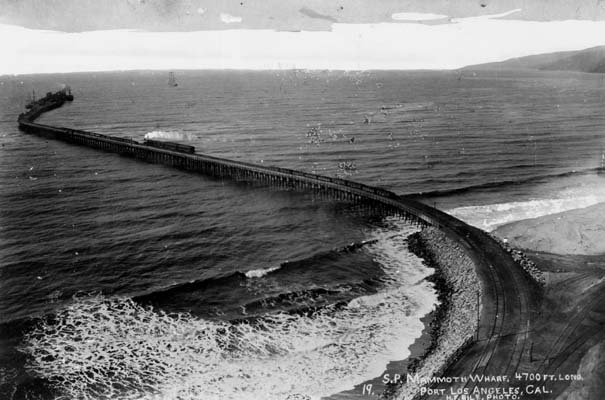
SP train at the "Long Wharf" terminus after the SPRR extension, 1893

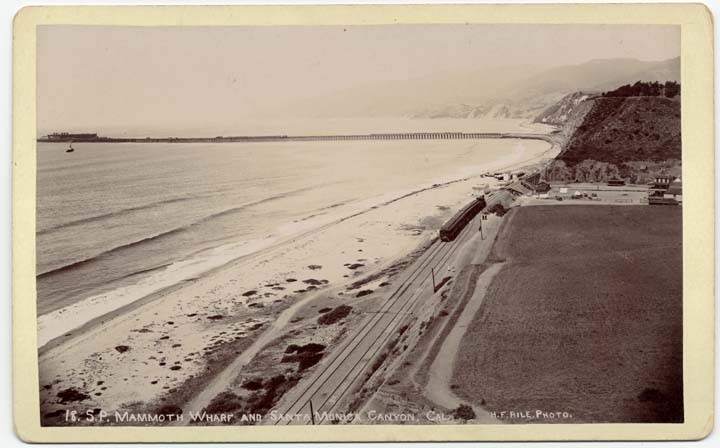
Looking north along what is now PCH toward the Long Wharf, 1904

== Bibliography ==
- Bell, Virginia (Summer 1981). "Trenor Park: A New Englander in California". California History. 60 (2). California Historical Society: 158–171. doi:10.2307/25158038. JSTOR 25158038.
- Hoyt, Franklyn (December 1950). "Los Angeles and Independence Railroad". Historical Society of Southern California Quarterly. 32 (4). Historical Society of Southern California: 293–308. doi:10.2307/41168274. JSTOR 41168274.
- Ingersoll, Luther A. (1908). Ingersoll's Century History – Santa Monica Bay Cities. Los Angeles: Luther A. Ingersoll.
- Likes, Robert C. & Day, Glenn R. (1975). From This Mountain-Cerro Gordo. Bishop, CA: Chalfont Press. ISBN 0-912494-15-8.
- Marquez, Ernest (1975). Port Los Angeles; A Phenomenon of the Railroad Era. San Marino, CA: Golden West Books. ISBN 0-87095-060-6.
- Nadeau, Remi (1971). City Makers; the story of Southern California's first boom, 1868-76. Corona del Mar, CA: Trans-Anglo Books. ISBN 9780870460159. OCLC 1148207815.
- Nadeau, Remi (1999). The Silver Seekers. Santa Barbara, CA: Crest Publishers. ISBN 0-9627104-7-4.
- Shumway, Gary (1980). Desert Fever. Los Angeles.
- Spitzzeri, Paul (Spring 2001). "The Road to Independence: The Los Angeles and Independence Railroad and the Conception of a City". Southern California Quarterly. 83 (1). Historical Society of Southern California: 23–58. doi:10.2307/41172051. JSTOR 41172051.
- Swett, Ira; Walker, Jim (1955). Los Angeles Pacific, Interurbans Special #18. Los Angeles, CA: Interurbans Publications. OCLC 8283871.
- Swett, Ira & Walker, Jim (1975). Lines of the Pacific Electric Southern and Western Districts, Interurbans Special #60. Glendale, CA: Interurbans Publications. ISBN 0-916374-02-5. OCLC 2119913.
