= Streetcar Depot, West Los Angeles =

- Streetcar Depot
- U.S. National Register of Historic Places
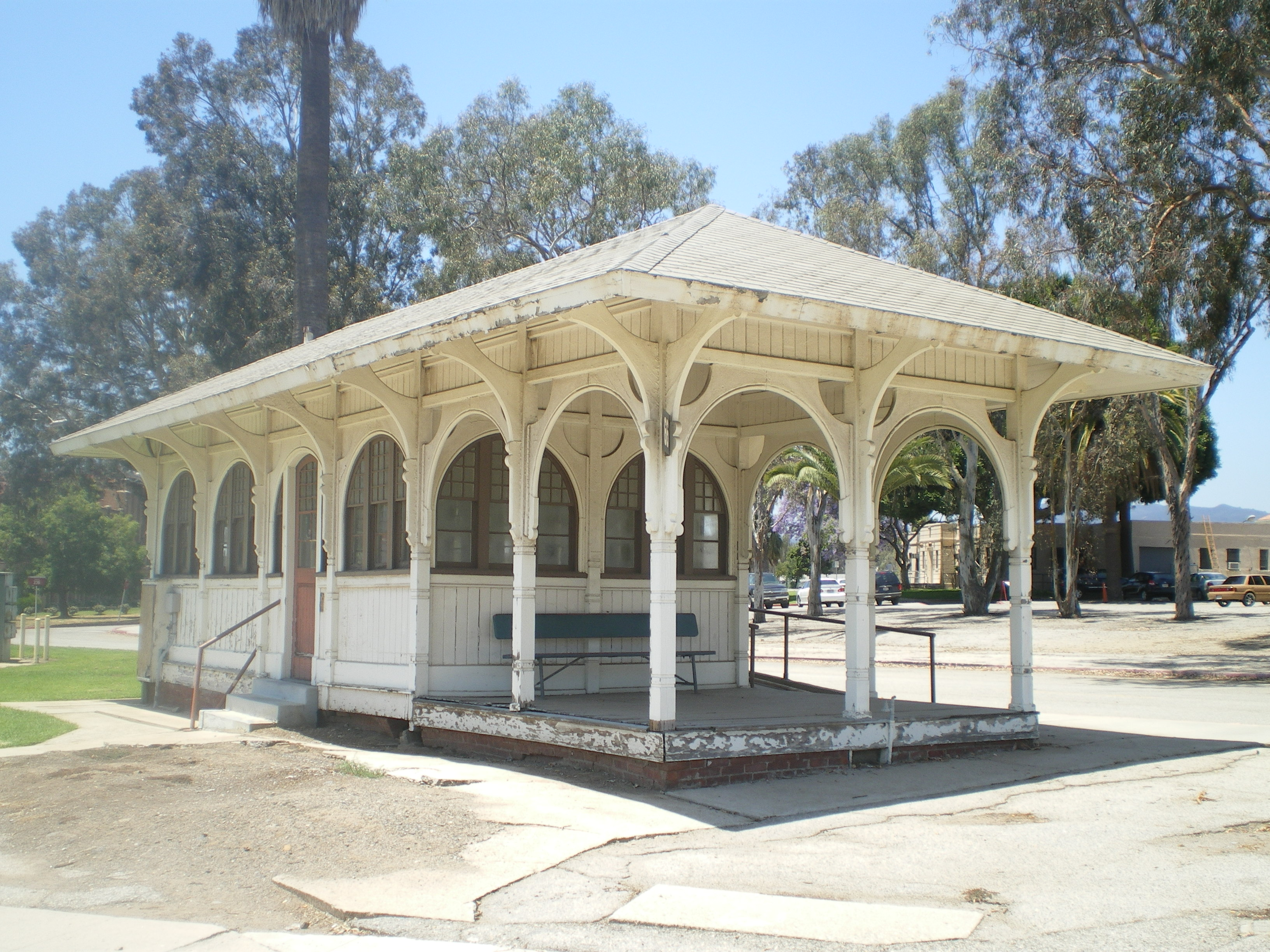
- West Los Angeles Streetcar Depot (2008)

- Location within the Los Angeles metropolitan area Location within California Location within the United States
- Location: Sawtelle, West Los Angeles, California
- Coordinates: 34°03′26″N 118°27′37″W
- Built: 1900
- Architect: J. Lee Burton, Peters & Burns
- Architectural style: Eastlake
- NRHP reference No.: 72000232
- Added to NRHP: February 23, 1972

The Sawtelle Streetcar Depot is located on the grounds of the Sawtelle Veterans Home in Sawtelle, in the Westside area of Los Angeles, California.

The depot was designed by J. Lee Burton in 1900, in conjunction with the nearby Wadsworth Chapel also on the Veterans Home campus. Both were listed in the National Register of Historic Places in 1972.

== History ==
This station was the Los Angeles Pacific Railroad terminus of the Soldiers' Home Line, a short extension of the Santa Monica Air Line to the Sawtelle Veterans Home. The depot also served the Balloon Route.

The extension started at the present-day Expo / Sepulveda station on the E Line (Los Angeles Metro) and continued north on the western side of Sepulveda Boulevard to the depot.

Passenger service to the station ended around July 1920. The line was maintained and operational — but seldom used — until the entire Air Line was abandoned. After closure the right-of-way was initially kept intact, but eventually sold off in piecemeal for various building developments, making any future restoration prohibitively expensive.

== Design ==
The wooden building was designed in the Victorian Eastlake Movement style by J. Lee Burton, and completed in 1900.

It is similar to another still-standing structure of the Air Line, the Palms-Southern Pacific Railroad Depot.

Preceding station	Southern Pacific Railroad	Following station
Terminus	Santa Monica Branch	Home Junction toward River
Preceding station	Pacific Electric	Following station
Terminus	Air Line Home Branch	Home Junction toward Pacific Electric Building

== See also ==
- National Register of Historic Places listings in Los Angeles, California
- Sawtelle, Los Angeles topics
- Stick-Eastlake architecture in California
- Wadsworth Chapel
