= Metro Rapid =

Bus service in Los Angeles County, California, US

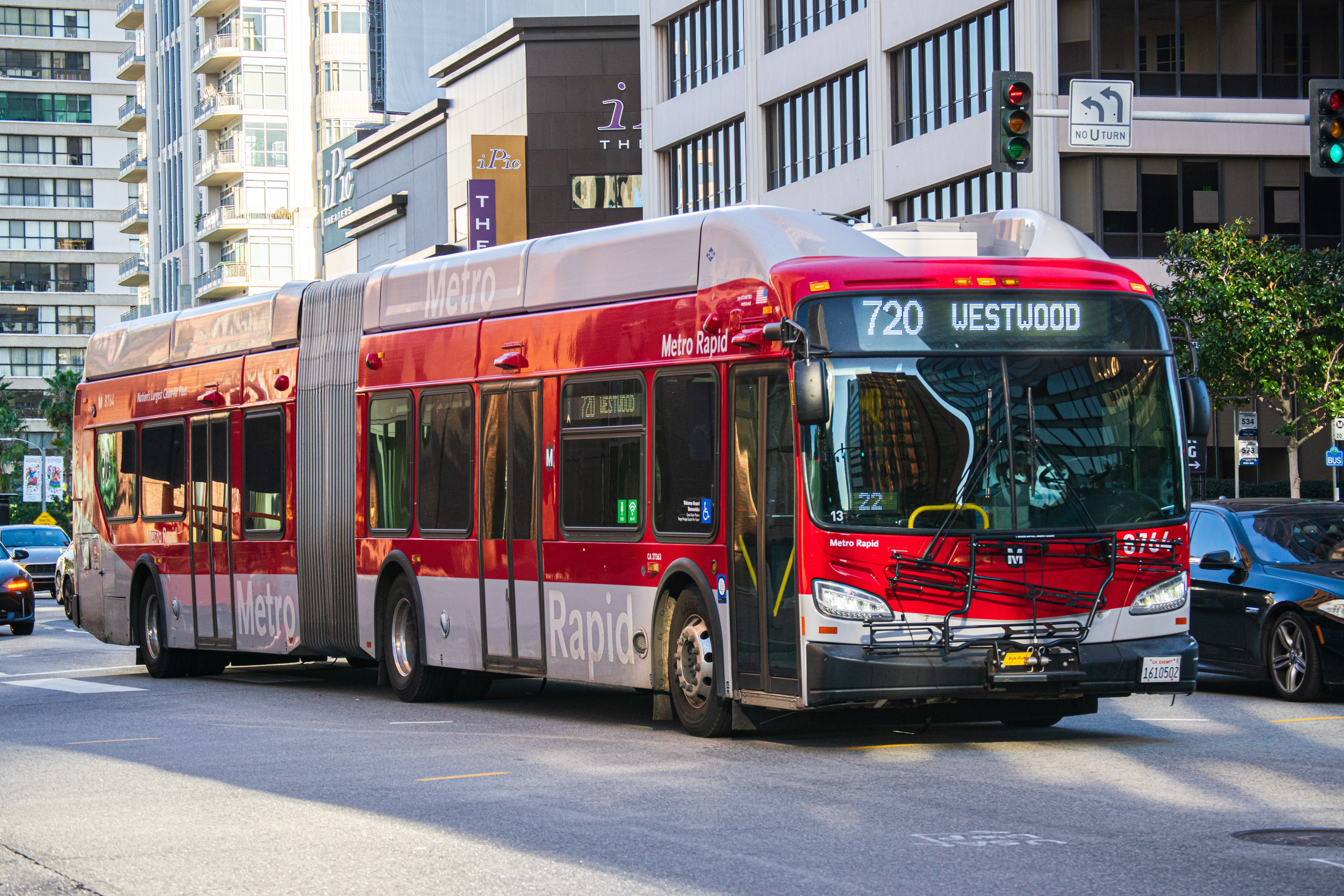
- Metro Rapid Line 720 bus on Wilshire Boulevard
- Commenced operation: June 24, 2000
- Locale: Los Angeles County, California
- Service type: Limited-stop, with some Bus rapid transit features
- Routes: 3 (as of 2026)
- Operator: Los Angeles Metro; Big Blue Bus; Culver CityBus; Torrance Transit
- Website: https://www.metro.net/

Metro Rapid is a bus service in Los Angeles County, California, operated as part of the Los Angeles Metro Bus system. Metro Rapid service was introduced in the early 2000s to provide faster service on major corridors in Los Angeles, with stops spaced approximately 1/2 mile (800 m) apart.

The first Metro Rapid lines featured physical infrastructure improvements, including signal priority at intersections in the City of Los Angeles, and enhanced bus shelters. The service was initially popular, expanding across Los Angeles County. Despite the service's initial popularity, service was cut on some major corridors in response to budget difficulties in the early 2010s.

A major reorganization of the Metro Bus network, the NextGen Bus Plan, was proposed in 2019. Much of the Metro Rapid network was suspended in 2020, as part of the broader impacts on transit from the COVID-19 pandemic, and most Rapid lines were not reinstated. The changes from the NextGen plan, implemented beginning in 2021, merged most Rapid lines back into their local counterparts.

== Service ==
Metro Rapid service is a limited-stop bus service, with characteristics of bus rapid transit. These characteristics include off-board fare payment on some lines, enhanced bus stops that are spaced farther apart than corresponding local services, and signal priority at some intersections.

The lack of dedicated bus lanes for Metro Rapid service has led scholars to describe it as "BRT-lite," as opposed to "bus rapid transit" or "full-service bus rapid transit."

== History ==
A delegation from the Los Angeles city government, including Mayor Richard Riordan, visited the Brazilian city of Curitiba in early 1999. The civic leaders were impressed by Curitiba's comprehensive bus rapid transit system, the Rede Integrada de Transporte, and sought to replicate it. By the summer of 1999, planning was underway for a pilot program of bus rapid transit service on two corridors: Wilshire Blvd/Whittier Blvd and Ventura Blvd.

The establishment of Metro Rapid service followed a 1996 consent decree, the product of a federal lawsuit brought by a coalition of civil rights organizations, including the Bus Riders Union. The plaintiffs in the lawsuit argued that Metro's large subsidies for rail construction and operation, relative to its expenditures for bus service, were discriminatory. Metro Rapid service was one part of Metro's proposals to improve bus service, approved by special master Donald T. Bliss. In addition to introducing Metro Rapid service, Metro expanded local and express bus service, purchased hundreds of new buses, and lowered bus pass prices.

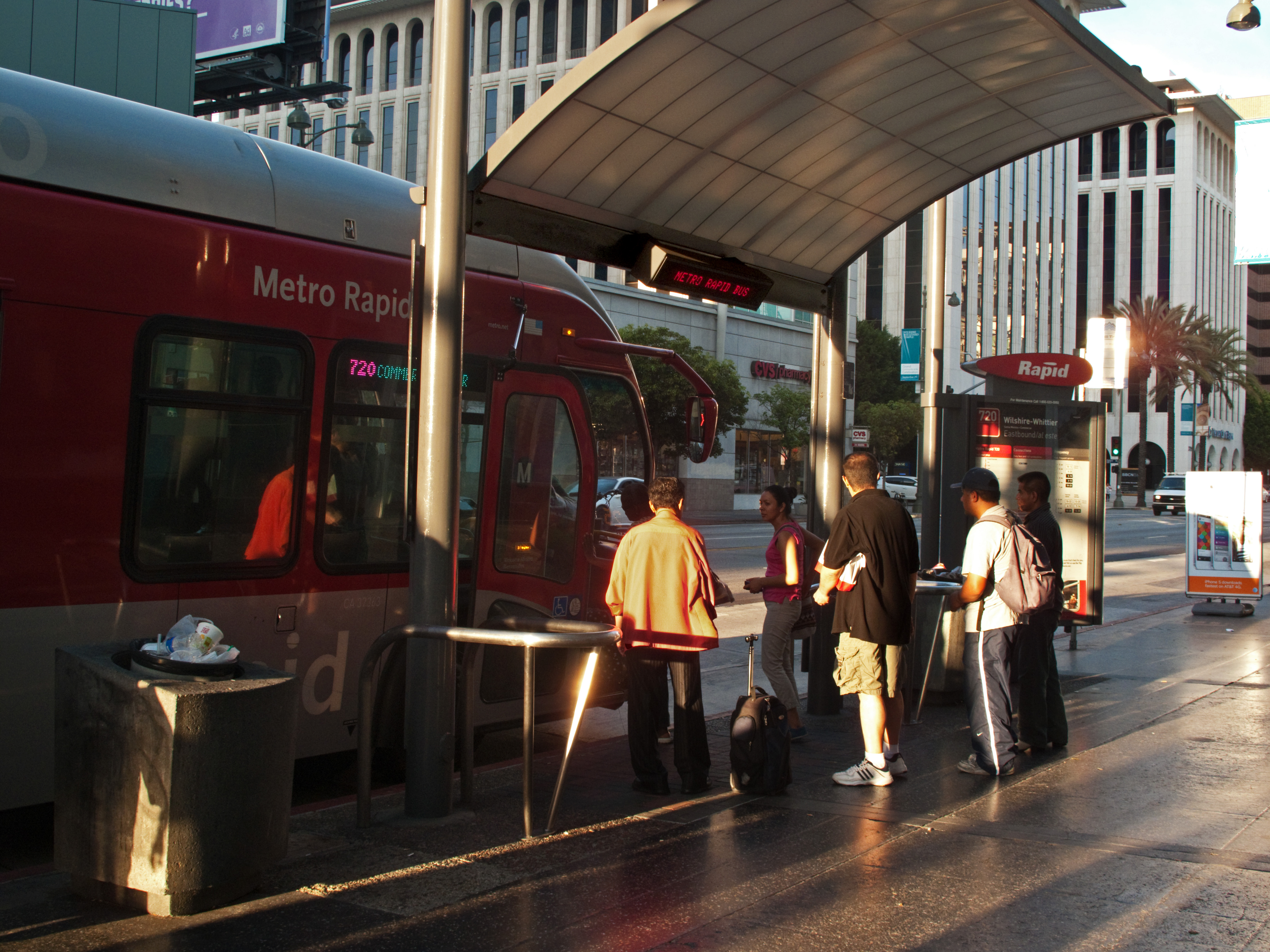
Metro Rapid stop on Wilshire Blvd from the 2000 pilot program, with amenities including a real-time arrivals display

Metro Rapid service on the two pilot corridors began in June 2000, opening on the same day as the Red Line extension to North Hollywood. Both lines were immediately popular, generating ridership growth of 25% in their first 90 days of operation. Travel time was improved by over 20% on both lines, aided by the signal priority at intersections in the City of Los Angeles. Customer satisfaction increased relative to the previous local and limited-stop bus services, and the Rapid service quickly captured over 60% of bus ridership on both corridors.

Following the initial pilot program of two lines in 2000, the Metro Rapid system expanded quickly. 6 lines were in operation in 2003, expanding to 26 lines in 2010. This rapid expansion was followed by significant reduction, with 5 Rapid lines cut in 2011 due to a budget crisis.

The NextGen Bus Plan, a Metro initiative to redesign its entire bus network, proposed to eliminate most of the Metro Rapid network beginning in 2020. Implementation of the NextGen plan was interrupted by the COVID-19 pandemic, which caused service cuts independent of the network redesign. In the recovery from the COVID-19 pandemic, beginning in late 2020, service was reallocated from Metro Rapid lines to local lines. A December 2020 service change eliminated 6 lines, and much of the rest of the network was proposed to be eliminated by 2021. The NextGen plan included the construction of over 30 miles (48 km) of new bus lanes across Los Angeles, a feature notably absent from the Metro Rapid system since its introduction.

As of 2026, three Metro Rapid lines remain in operation, serving the Wilshire Blvd, Vermont Av, and Van Nuys Blvd/Sepulveda Pass corridors.

== Perception and criticism ==
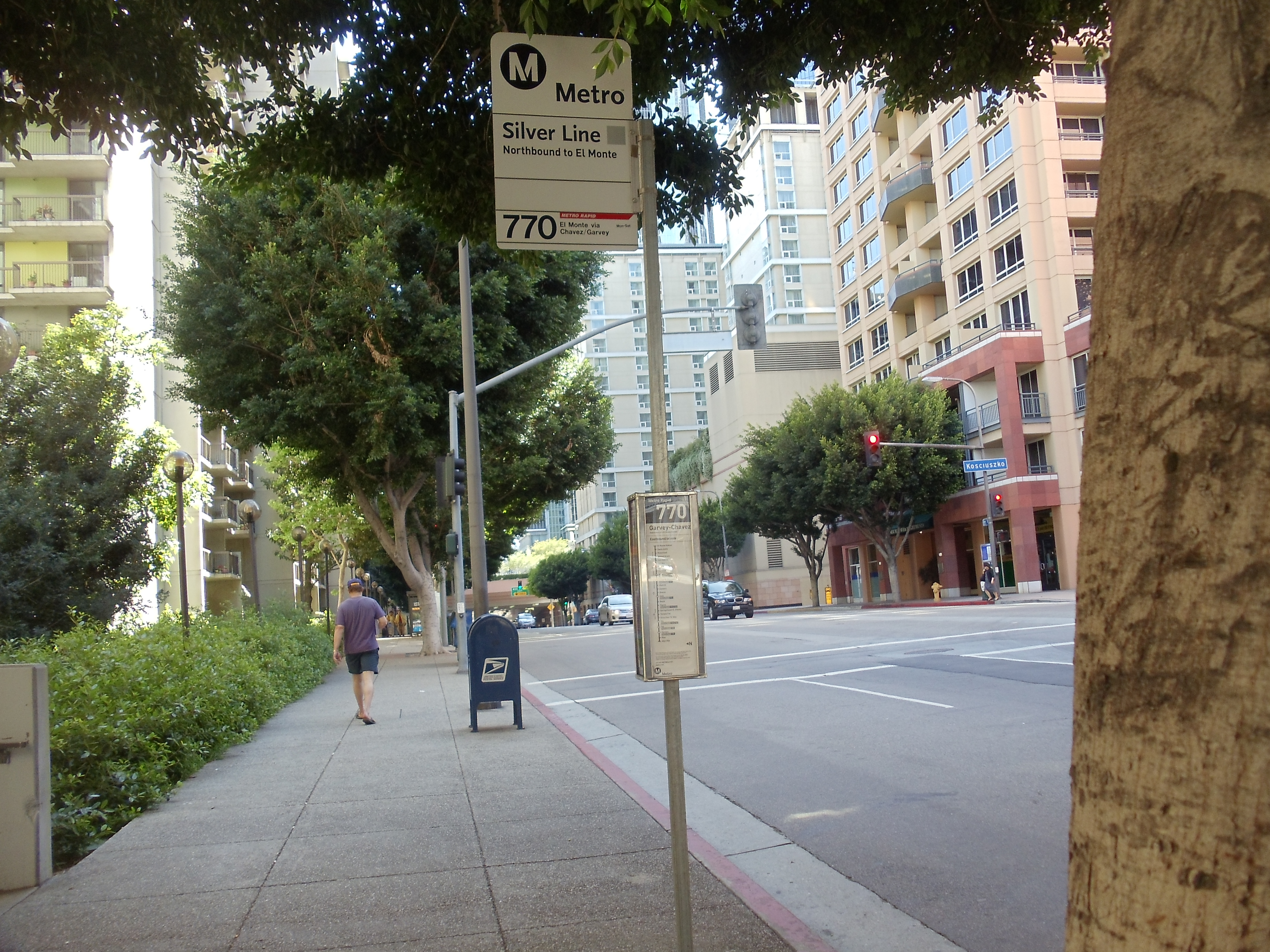
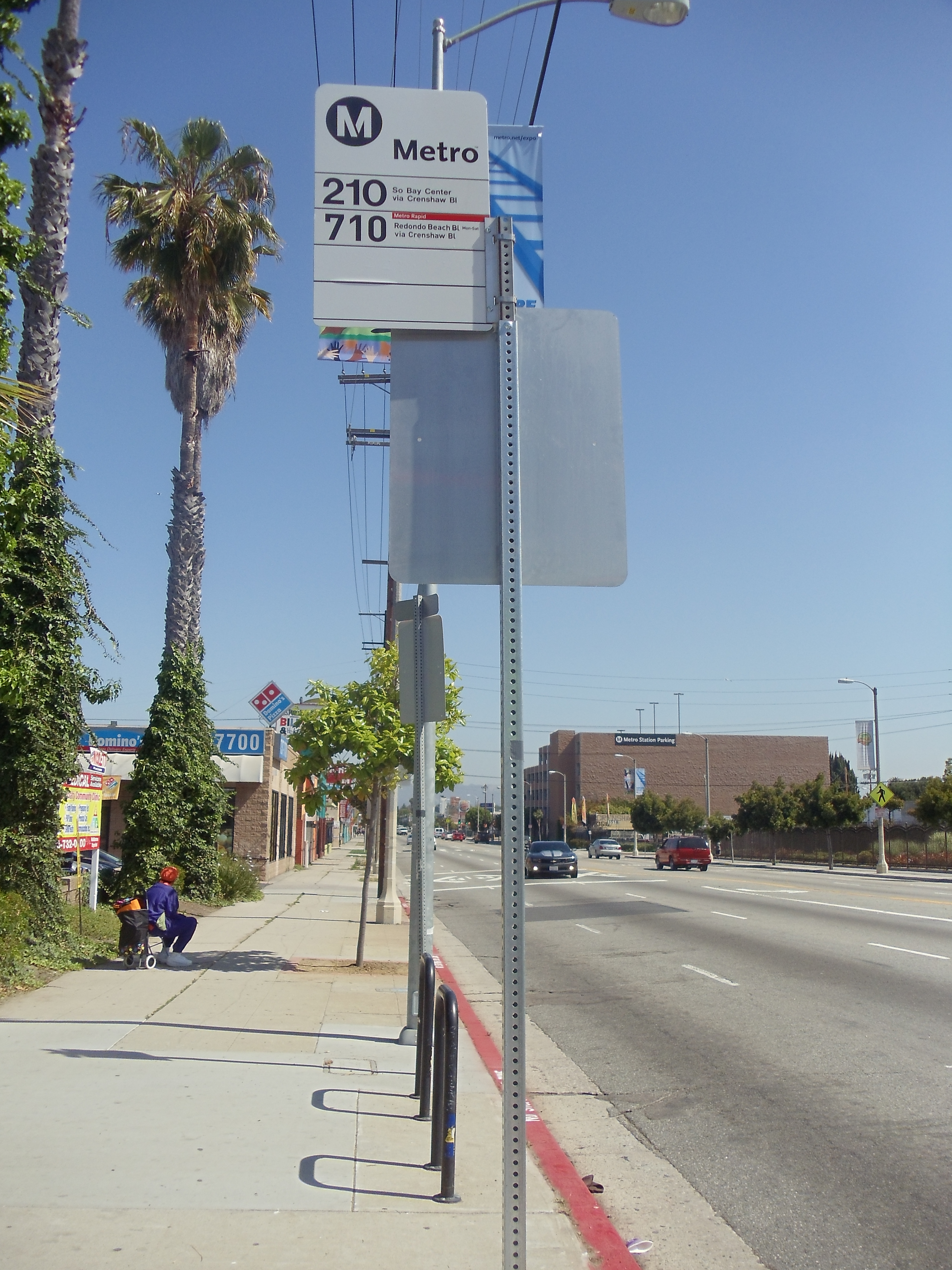
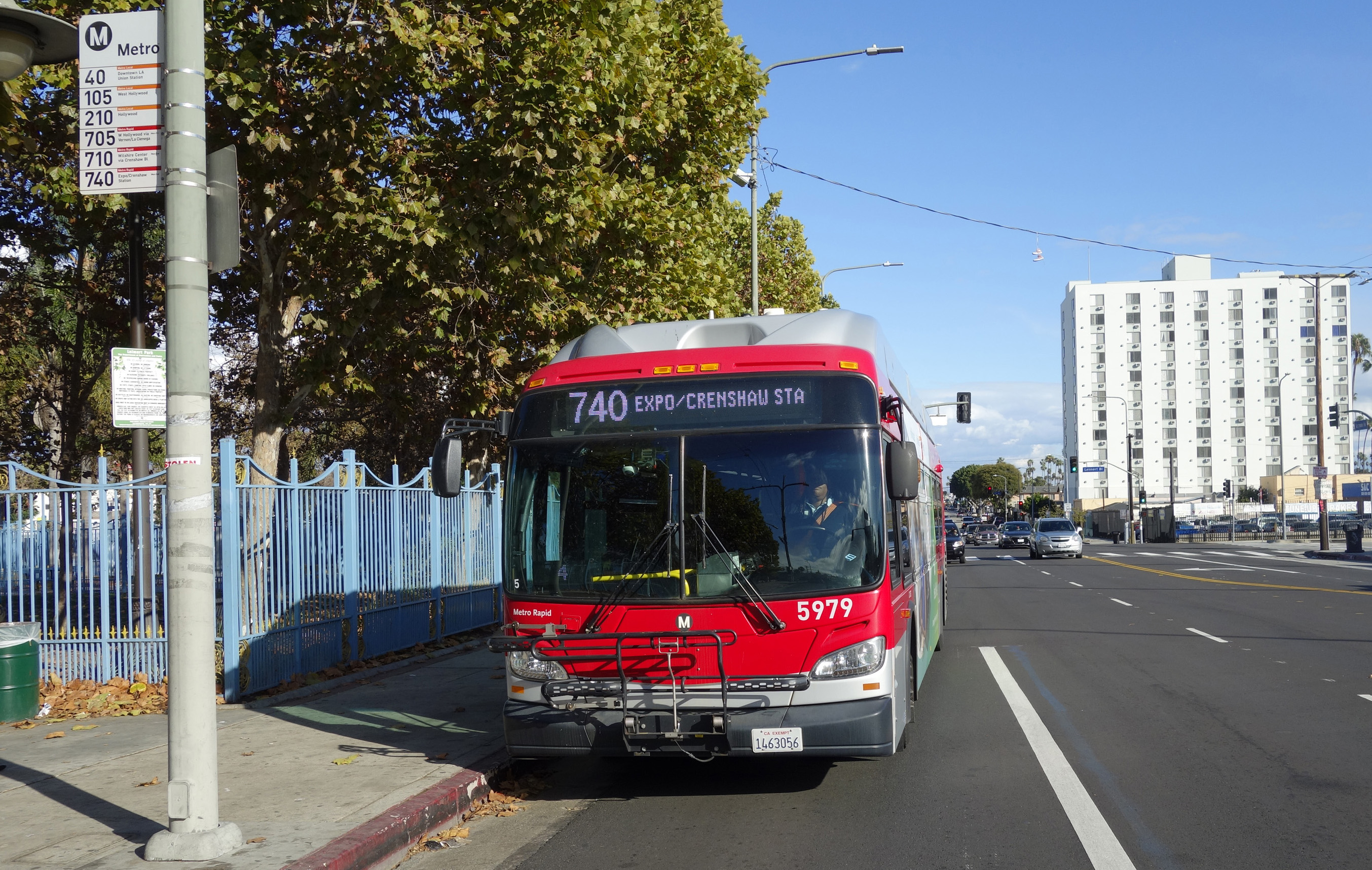
Bus stops on later Metro Rapid lines, as shown here, often lacked amenities

A 2009 study by the National Bus Rapid Transit Institute found that the public perception of Metro Rapid service was better than that of Metro's corresponding local bus services, and similar to the Blue Line. However, Metro Rapid service was perceived as lower-quality than Orange Line BRT and Metro's other rail services.

Transit planner Jarrett Walker, who is unaffiliated with Metro, criticized the rapid growth of the Metro Rapid service on multiple occasions. Walker characterized the system as "diluted," commenting that Metro Rapid lines introduced after the first two lacked the bus stop amenities, service frequency, and signal priority that defined the two initial lines. Walker nonetheless praised the system for the attitude it represented, describing it as "a remarkable effort to step up mobility all over the city in a very short time."

== Routes ==
=== Current Metro Rapid routes ===
Route	Terminals		via	Days of Operation	Notes
720	Santa Monica; Downtown Santa Monica station	Downtown LA; 6th & Central	Wilshire Bl	Daily (Mon-Fri: 4:30a-1a; Sat/Sun: 5a-1a)	Service began June 2000, part of the initial pilot program; Replaced Local Limited Lines 318, 320 and 322; Operates alongside Line 20, which is extended to Santa Monica when Line 720 is not in service during the night
720	Westwood; Wilshire Bl & Westwood Bl	Downtown LA; 6th & Central	Wilshire Bl	Daily (Mon-Fri: 4:30a-1a; Sat/Sun: 5a-1a)	Service began June 2000, part of the initial pilot program; Replaced Local Limited Lines 318, 320 and 322; Operates alongside Line 20, which is extended to Santa Monica when Line 720 is not in service during the night
754	East Hollywood; Vermont Ave & Hollywood Bl	Athens; Vermont Ave & 120th St	Vermont Av	Daily (Mon-Fri: 5a-9:30p; Sa: 6a-9:15p; Su: 6a-8:30p)	Service began December 2002; Replaced Local Limited Line 354; Operates alongside Line 204
761	Sylmar; Sylmar/San Fernando station	West LA; Expo/Sepulveda station	Van Nuys Bl, Sepulveda Bl	Daily (6a-9p)	Operates alongside Line 233, which is extended to West LA when Line 761 is not in operation for the night

=== Rapid routes operated by other agencies ===
Route	Terminals		via	Days of Operation	Notes
Big Blue Bus Rapid 10	Santa Monica; 2nd St & Colorado Av	Downtown LA; Main St & Alameda St	Santa Monica Bl, Bundy Dr, I-10, Grand Av/Olive St, Figueroa St/Flower St, Temple St	Weekday peak hours (6a-8:15a, 3:30p-6:15p)	Branded as a Rapid route, but is primarily a freeway express route; Operates into Downtown LA in the AM rush and into Downtown Santa Monica in the PM rush
Big Blue Bus Rapid 12	Westwood; UCLA Gateway Plaza	Palms; Overland Ave & Venice Bl	Westwood Bl, Overland Av	Daily (M-F: 5:30a-11:00p; Sa/Su: 6:30a-11:00p)	
Culver CityBus Rapid 6	Westwood; UCLA Gateway Plaza	Westchester; LAX/Metro Transit Center	Sepulveda Bl	Weekdays (5:50a-9:57a; 2:20p-7:35p)	Operates alongside Culver CityBus Line 6; Expected to replace Line 6 in the near future.
Torrance Transit Rapid 3	Torrance; Mary K. Giordano Regional Transit Center	Long Beach; Downtown Long Beach Station	Carson St, Avalon Bl, Pacific Coast Hwy	Weekdays (6:05a-10:20a; 2:15p-7:40p)	Operates alongside Torrance Transit Line 3

=== Former routes ===
Route	Terminals		via	Notes/History
704	Santa Monica; Ocean Ave & Arizona Ave	Downtown LA; Union Station	Santa Monica Bl	Service began on June 24 2007, replaced Line 304 and operated alongside Line 4.; Discontinued on September 12, 2021, as part the NextGen Bus Plan. Replaced by an increased frequency for Line 4 which was extended to Santa Monica from West LA all-day replacing the entire Line 704 with the exception of the Union Station leg.
705	West Hollywood; West Hollywood Library	Vernon; Vernon Ave & Santa Fe Ave	La Cienega Bl, Vernon Av	Service began June 28 2004 and operated alongside Line 105.; Discontinued in December 2020 as part of a restructuring for NextGen Bus Plan. Replaced by an increased frequency for Line 105.
710	Koreatown, Los Angeles; Wilshire/Western Station	Redondo Beach; South Bay Galleria	Crenshaw Bl	Service began February 2004, replaced Line 310 and operated alongside Line 210.; Saturday service was added to Line 710 in June 2006 until it was discontinued in April 2020 due to the COVID-19 pandemic.; Used to run as far as Hollywood/Vine Station via Vine Bl until it was shortened to Wilshire/Western Station in June 2007.; Discontinued in December 2020 as part of a restructuring for NextGen Bus Plan. Replaced by increased service for Line 210 to which was rerouted to Wilshire/Western D Line Station to replace Line 710's coverage, and in addition to rerouting service from Artesia Bl to Redondo Beach Bl, following Line 710's route.
711	Inglewood; Inglewood Transit Center	Bell Gardens; Florence Ave & Garfield Av	Florence Av	Began service on June 29, 2003, to replace the Local Limited Line 311.; Reverted to Limited Line 311 in December 2010, and Line 311 was once again cancelled in June 2016. Replaced by a higher frequency for Line 111.
714	Beverly Hills; Santa Monica Bl & Canon Dr	Downtown LA; Grand/LATTC station	Beverly Bl	Began service in June 2005 as a rush hour only route. Midday service was added in June 2008.; Discontinued in December 2010 due to low ridership. Replaced by an increased service for Line 14.
715	Westchester, Los Angeles; LAX City Bus Center	Downey; Downey Depot Transportation Center	Manchester Bl, Manchester Av, Firestone Bl	Began service in June 2008, replaced the Local Limited Line 315 for weekday services.; Originally ended at South Gate at Firestone/Atlantic until it was extended to City of Downey in December 2008.; Discontinued in December 2010 due to low ridership. Replaced by an increased service for Line 115 with the exception of LAX City Bus Center leg.
715	Inglewood; Inglewood Transit Center	Downey; Downey Depot Transportation Center	Manchester Bl, Manchester Av, Firestone Bl	Began service in June 2008, replaced the Local Limited Line 315 for weekday services.; Originally ended at South Gate at Firestone/Atlantic until it was extended to City of Downey in December 2008.; Discontinued in December 2010 due to low ridership. Replaced by an increased service for Line 115 with the exception of LAX City Bus Center leg.
717	Hollywood; Hollywood/Vine station	Culver City; West Los Angeles Transit Center	Hollywood Bl, Fairfax Av	Began operating in June 2005, replacing the Local Limited Line 317, which began in December 2004.; Merged with Line 780 in June 2006 which later was discontinued in June 2021 in favor of increased frequency of Line 217.
724	Sylmar, Los Angeles; Sylmar/San Fernando Station	North Hollywood, Los Angeles; North Hollywood station	San Fernando Rd, Lankershim Bl	Began service in June 2008, and operated alongside Metro Line 224; Discontinued in June 2009 due to low ridership; Line 724 deviation on San Fernando Rd was replaced by an extension of Line 794 which was later discontinued in June 2021. While Line 224 increased service on Lankershim Bl.
728	Century City, Los Angeles; Constellation Bl & Century Park W	Downtown LA; Union Station	Olympic Bl	Began December 2007, replaced Line 328 and operates alongside Line 28.; Discontinued in December 2020 as part of a restructuring for NextGen Bus Plan. Replaced by a higher frequency for Line 28.
730	Mid-City, Los Angeles; Pico/Rimpau Transit Center	Little Tokyo; Little Tokyo/Arts District station	Pico Bl	Began operating in June 2008, replaced Local Limited Line 330 and operated alongside Line 30.; Originally ran into Union Station until it was relocated to Little Tokyo/Arts District Station in June 2009.; Reverted to Line 330 in June 2012, and Line 330 was cancelled once again in December 2020. Replaced by a higher frequency for Line 30.
733	Santa Monica; 2nd St & Santa Monica Bl	Downtown LA; Union Station	Venice Bl	Began June 2010, replaced Line 333 and operated alongside Line 33; Discontinued in September 2021, due to Phase 2.5 of the NextGen Bus Plan. Replaced by an increased frequency for Line 33 in which select trips were extended to Santa Monica from Venice (Main & Sunset Layover), and from Downtown LA (7th & Main) to Union Station all-day replacing Line 733.
734	Sylmar, Los Angeles; Sylmar/San Fernando station	West LA; Expo/Sepulveda station	Sepulveda Bl	Began June 2006, operated alongside Line 234 (which replaced service everyday during late evenings and early mornings and all day on weekends).; Discontinued on June 27, 2021 due to the 2nd phase of NextGen Bus Plan. Service between Ventura Bl and Sylmar Station is replaced by a higher frequency Line 234. Service south of Ventura Bl is replaced by Line 761.
740	Jefferson Park, Los Angeles; Expo/Crenshaw station	Redondo Beach; South Bay Galleria	Crenshaw Bl, Hawthorne Bl	Began December 2004, replaced Line 340 and operated alongside Line 40.; Originally ran into Union Station via Martin Luther King Bl and Broadway until it was relocated to Expo/Crenshaw Station in June 2012.; Discontinued in December 2020 as part of a restructuring for NextGen Bus Plan, replaced by a higher frequency of Line 40 with the exception of Expo/Crenshaw leg.
741	Northridge; Reseda Blvd & Devonshire St	Tarzana; Ventura Bl & Reseda Bl	Reseda Bl	Began operating in December 2006.; Was one of the shortest Rapid Lines in the system.; Replaced by Line 744 in December 2014 which later was discontinued in June 2021 in favor of more frequent Line 240 service.
744	Pacoima; Van Nuys Bl & Glenoaks Bl	Northridge; Reseda Bl & Devonshire St (weekdays only)	Van Nuys Bl, Ventura Bl, Reseda Bl	Began December 2014, replaced Lines 741 and 761. It operated alongside Lines 233 and 240; This line and Line 788 were the last Rapid Lines ever released as a new number line.; Discontinued on June 27, 2021, due to the 2nd phase of NextGen Bus Plan. Service west on Ventura and Sepulveda Bls was replaced by a higher frequency of Line 240. Service on Van Nuys Bls was reverted to Line 761, except the northern terminal was relocated to Sylmar instead of Pacoima.
744	Pacoima; Van Nuys Bl & Glenoaks Bl	Sherman Oaks, Los Angeles; Sherman Oaks Galleria	Van Nuys Bl, Ventura Bl, Reseda Bl	Began December 2014, replaced Lines 741 and 761. It operated alongside Lines 233 and 240; This line and Line 788 were the last Rapid Lines ever released as a new number line.; Discontinued on June 27, 2021, due to the 2nd phase of NextGen Bus Plan. Service west on Ventura and Sepulveda Bls was replaced by a higher frequency of Line 240. Service on Van Nuys Bls was reverted to Line 761, except the northern terminal was relocated to Sylmar instead of Pacoima.
745	Downtown LA; Union Station	South LA; Harbor Freeway station	Broadway	Began December 2002, replaced Line 345 and operated alongside Line 45.; Discontinued in December 2020 as part of a restructuring for NextGen Bus Plan, replaced by a higher frequency of Line 45 with the exception of the deviation to Union Station.
750	Canoga Park, Los Angeles; Canoga station	Studio City, Los Angeles; Universal City/Studio City station	Ventura Bl	Began June 2000, one of the two original routes, replaced Express Lines 425 and 427 and operated alongside Line 150; Originally operated daily until it was reduced to a weekday-only route in December 2010.; Discontinued on June 27, 2021 due to the 2nd phase of NextGen Bus Plan. Replaced by a higher frequency of Line 150 west of Reseda Bl and higher frequency of Line 240 east of Reseda Bl.
751	Cypress Park, Los Angeles; Ave 28 & Idell St	Huntington Park; Palm Pl & Seville Av	Ave 26, Daly St, Soto St, Pacific Bl	Began June 2004, replaced Line 350 and operated alongside Line 251.; Originally ran far to Lynwood C Line Station on weekdays only until it was shortened to Palm / Seville in June 2007 to lower the overlap for Line 760 which was being implemented at the same time.; Originally had a Saturday service until it was discontinued in June 2011 due to low ridership.; Discontinued in December 2020 as part of a restructuring for NextGen Bus Plan, replaced by a higher frequency of Line 251.
753	Downtown LA; 5th St & Beaudry Av	Willowbrook; Willowbrook/Rosa Parks station	Central Av	Began operating in June 2008, replaced Local Limited Line 350.; Discontinued in December 2010 due to low ridership, replaced by a higher frequency of Line 53.; In December 2021, Line 53 was rerouted to Willowbrook/Rosa Parks Station, marking the first time since Line 753's discontinuation to have service from Willowbrook/Rosa Parks Station to the Central Ave corridor.
757	East Hollywood, Los Angeles; Hollywood/Western station	Hawthorne; Crenshaw station	Western Av	Began December 2005, replaced Line 357 and operated alongside Line 207; Originally operated 7 days a week until its weekend and holiday service was discontinued in June 2011 due to lack of time travel savings.; Discontinued on June 27, 2021 due to the 2nd phase of NextGen Bus Plan. Replaced by a higher frequency of Line 207 which was extended to Crenshaw Station all-day to replace Line 757's segment.
760	Downtown LA; 5th St & Beaudry Av	Lynwood; Lynwood station	Santa Fe Av, Pacific Bl, Long Beach Bl	Began June 2007, replaced Line 360 and operated alongside Line 60.; Used to run as far south to Artesia A Line Station and operated daily until it was shortened to Lynwood C Line Station and discontinued Sunday and Holiday Service in June 2011 due to lack of time travel savings, until Saturday service was discontinued in April 2020 due to COVID-19 Pandemic.; Discontinued in December 2020 as part of a restructuring for NextGen Bus Plan, replaced by a higher frequency of Line 60.
762	Pasadena; Fair Oaks Ave & Colorado Bl	Compton; Artesia station	Fair Oaks Av, Atlantic Bl	Began June 2008, replaced Line 361 and operated alongside Line 260.; Originally had a Saturday service until it was discontinued in December 2010 due to low ridership.; Discontinued in December 2020 as part of a restructuring for NextGen Bus Plan, replaced by a higher frequency of Line 260 & new Line 261.; In December 2024, Line 260 was rerouted to Willowbrook/Rosa Parks A & C Lines Station. The remainder of Line 260 south of Imperial Hwy to Artesia A Line Station was renumbered to Metro Local Line 261.
762	Pasadena; Fair Oaks Ave & Colorado Bl	Lynwood; Imperial Hwy & Atlantic Bl	Fair Oaks Av, Atlantic Bl	
770	Downtown LA; Broadway & Venice Bl	El Monte; El Monte station	Cesar E. Chavez Av, Garvey Av	Began December 2007, replaced Lines 368 and 370 and operated alongside Lines 68 and 70; Saturday service was added in June 2008 until was it was discontinued in April 2020, due to the COVID-19 pandemic.; Discontinued on June 27, 2021 due to the 2nd phase of NextGen Bus Plan. Replaced by a higher frequency of the rerouted Line 70 which now follows the path of the former Line 770.
780	Pasadena; Pasadena City College	Culver City; West Los Angeles Transit Center	Colorado Bl, Hollywood Bl, Fairfax Av	Began operating in December 2004; Replaced 380 in June 2005 to have a western terminus at Hollywood/Highland Station and combined it with the 717 in June 2006 to extend to its current western terminus at West Los Angeles Transit Center.; Weekend and Holiday service was added between Pasadena and Hollywood in June 2008, until it was discontinued in December 2010 due to low ridership.; Operated alongside Lines 180, 181 and 217; Discontinued on June 27, 2021 due to the 2nd phase of NextGen Bus Plan. Replaced by a higher frequency of the newly rerouted Line 180 from Hollywood/Vine to Pasadena City College, and a higher frequency of Line 217 which is now extended east to Eagle Rock Plaza.
788	Arleta; Van Nuys Bl & Woodman Av	West LA; Expo/Sepulveda station	Van Nuys Blvd, Interstate 405	Began December 2014; Closed-door along the San Fernando Valley for northbound service and Westwood for southbound service.; Also known as "Valley - Westside Express"; Was the only Rapid-Express Line that ever ran on a freeway.; This Line and Line 744 were the last Rapid Lines ever released as a new number line.; Was suspended in June 2020 due to the COVID-19 pandemic until it was discontinued permanently in June 2021 due to the NextGen Bus Plan.; Alternatives to this line include the resurrected Line 761 on Van Nuys and Sepulveda Bls from Arleta to West LA.
794	Sylmar, Los Angeles; Sylmar/San Fernando Station	Downtown LA; Hill St & Venice Bl	San Fernando Rd	Began June 2008, replaced Line 394 and operated alongside Lines 94 and 224; Was extended to Sylmar Station in June 2009 replacing Line 724 segment on San Fernando Rd and weekend/holiday service was added.; Weekend and Holiday service was discontinued in June 2011 due to a lack of travel time savings.; Discontinued on June 27, 2021 due to the 2nd phase of NextGen Bus Plan. Replaced by a higher frequency of Line 94 from Burbank to Downtown LA, and a new Line 294 from Burbank to Sylmar.
920	Santa Monica; Colorado Ave & Ocean Ave	Koreatown, Los Angeles; Wilshire/Vermont station	Wilshire Bl	Began operating in June 2007; Former Rapid Express Line counterpart for Line 720.; Operated during weekday peak hours; Discontinued in December 2010 due to low ridership, although riders have advocated improvements, during the service's short life. Replaced by an increased service for Line 720.
920	Westwood, Los Angeles; Wilshire Bl & Westwood Bl	Koreatown, Los Angeles; Wilshire/Vermont station	Wilshire Bl	Began operating in June 2007; Former Rapid Express Line counterpart for Line 720.; Operated during weekday peak hours; Discontinued in December 2010 due to low ridership, although riders have advocated improvements, during the service's short life. Replaced by an increased service for Line 720.
940	Downtown LA; Union Station	Torrance; Del Amo Fashion Center	Martin Luther King Jr. Bl, Crenshaw Bl, La Brea Av, Hawthorne Bl	Began operating in June 2007; Former Rapid Express Line counterpart for Line 740.; Operated during weekday peak hours in peak directions; Briefly operated to Del Amo Fashion Center from December 2007 until it was discontinued.; Discontinued in June 2008 due to low ridership, although riders have advocated improvements , during the service's short life. Replaced by an increased service for Line 740 which later was discontinued in December 2020.
Big Blue Bus Rapid 3	Santa Monica; 4th St & Wilshire Bl	Westchester; LAX/Metro Transit Center	Lincoln Bl	Operated alongside Big Blue Bus Line 3; Discontinued after August 8, 2025
Big Blue Bus Rapid 7	Santa Monica; Broadway & 5th St	Koreatown; Wilshire/Western Station	Pico Bl	Operated alongside Big Blue Bus Line 7; Discontinued after August 8, 2025
