= Doug Suisman =

American architect

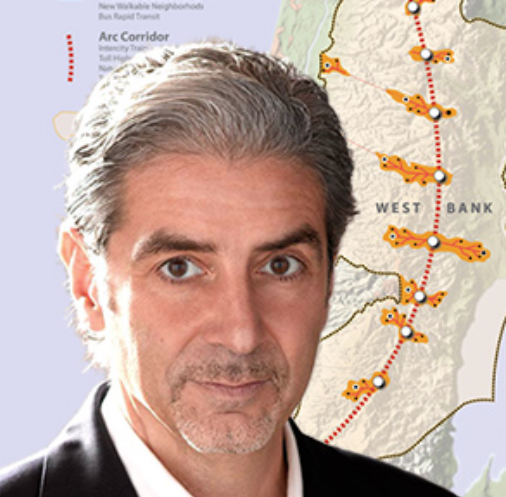
- Born: Doug Suisman; March 14, 1955 (age 71); Hartford, Connecticut
- Education: Phillips Academy; Yale University; Columbia University
- Occupation: Architect
- Awards: Medal in City and Regional Planning (Univ. of Pennsylvania), Honor Award in Urban Design (AIA California), National Honor Award, American Institute of Architects; Progressive Architecture Award, World Architecture Festival
- Practice: Suisman Urban Design
- Website: suisman.com

Doug Suisman (born 14 March 1955) is an American urban designer and architect. Suisman founded the Los Angeles-based firm, Suisman Urban Design, in 1990 and has since worked on projects in a variety of cities including Los Angeles, Ramallah, and Vancouver, among others. His work emphasizes sustainable development, public transportation, communal spaces and structures, and walkable streets. His projects include master plans and facilities for regional transit systems, downtowns, cultural districts, university campuses, transit-oriented development, civic and community centers, plazas, parks, and streetscapes.

Suisman won the Top Master Plan and Future Project of the Year award at the 2010 World Architecture Festival for The Arc. Suisman's iQuilt cultural district plan for downtown Hartford, won an AIA Honor Award and two grants from the National Endowment for the Arts. His Hartford 400 plan was the recipient in 2022 of both the Honor Award in Urban Design from the American Institute of Architects California and the Witte-Sakamoto Family Medily for City and Regional Planning from the University of Pennsylvania Stuart Weitzman School of Design.

In 1999, Suisman was made a Fellow of the American Institute of Architects. In 2006, Suisman was named a National Peer in Urban Design by the U.S. General Services Administration.

Suisman is the author of Los Angeles Boulevard, described by Christopher Hawthorne, Los Angeles Times Architecture Critic, as, "...the most important take on this gigantic subject."

== Early life and education ==
Suisman was born and raised in Hartford, Connecticut. He attended Phillips Academy in Andover, Massachusetts from 1968 to 1972 and earned his Bachelor of Arts from Yale University in 1976, graduating cum laude. In 1981, Suisman obtained his Master of Architecture from Columbia University and was awarded the American Institute of Architects Medal.

== Academic career ==
Influenced by Reyner Banham's Los Angeles: The Architecture of Four Ecologies, Suisman moved to Los Angeles in 1983. From 1984 to 1988, he taught architectural design courses at the University of Southern California while studying the urban layout of Los Angeles and collecting research for his 1989 book, Los Angeles Boulevard. In 1987, Suisman won a grant from the National Endowment for the Arts for his study of the "relationship between architecture and movement in American cities." From 1988 to 1989, he was a visiting associate professor at the School of Architecture at the University of Minnesota in Minneapolis. From 1989 to 1991, Suisman taught architectural design and theory to both undergraduates and graduate students at the University of California, Berkeley.

== Professional projects ==
In 1997, Suisman collaborated with Meléndrez Associates, Johnson Fain, RAW International, and Landmark Partners to create a master plan for the Civic Center of Los Angeles. Dubbed the "Ten Minute Diamond," the plan envisioned a diamond-shaped district based on a ten-minute walk from the central rotunda of City Hall. The diamond was divided into four quarters: Riverbed, New Town, Hillside, and Old Pueblo, with City Hall as the central feature. The project drew attention from a variety of media outlets including the Los Angeles Times.

In 2001, the Los Angeles County Metropolitan Transportation Authority unveiled Suisman's redesign of the Metro Rapid graphics and architecture. Suisman's improvements included new branding for the buses and stations, and bus stops that featured skylit canopies and electronic signs with real-time arrival information.

Suisman's collaboration with the RAND Corporation led to "The Arc: A Formal Structure for the Palestinian State," a master plan that envisioned a transportation and infrastructure corridor that would link the West Bank and Gaza Strip. Suisman received international attention for his plan, Bloomberg News described it:

A concept of breathtaking sweep and simplicity, yet surprisingly practical...the elegance of Suisman's idea ad its ready comprehensibility has drawn worldwide political press and political attention.

Of the Arc plan, Planetizen reported: "Suisman Urban Design was hired to design a theoretical Palestinian State, in the hopes that the plan might encourage the peace process. The plan was released in 2005, and has been gaining traction and admiration ever since." The project was the subject of an extraordinary 3-page cover story in the Arts section of the New York Times by renowned journalist James Bennet, called "A Blueprint for Palestine 'the day after peace.'" The Independent in the U.K. reported, "This is a vision of the future Arab state as set out by a $2m study by one of America's most prestigious think-tanks. What's more, the Palestinians love it."

Writing in Foreign Affairs, the diplomat L. Carl Brown wrote,

"The RAND Corporation has done itself proud...The Arc offers a model of the most efficient settlement and transportation configuration for this small and densely populated land. It is one of those rare planning documents, enriched with comparative data and meaningful illustrations, that both instructs and persuades."

The urban planner Yael Allweil, writing in a peer-reviewed journal Places at U.C. Berkeley, observed,

"Since its release, in 2005, the plan has received overwhelming praise, in positive reviews from more than two hundred media outlets worldwide. But it was the vision that struck the jury most. Its strength was precisely its ability to regard Palestine not as a political problem, but as a planning and design problem. Even if resolution of the Arab-Israeli conflict may be years away, it places the needs of a future Palestine at the center of discussion, and by addressing them with objective professionalism, the Arc has created a tangible object of hope."

In 2008, The Children's Museum of Pittsburgh hosted the "Charm Bracelet Competition," a design competition that selected four teams out of a pool of both national and international entrants, and chose Suisman as one of the four teams to reinvigorate the North Side neighborhood of Pittsburgh, formerly known as Allegheny City. Working with the Urban Lab at Carnegie Mellon University, Suisman intensively researched the history of the North Side neighborhood and devised a plan to revitalize the area.

That same year, Suisman began developing the iQuilt Plan for Downtown Hartford, a master plan that imagined a more culturally and spatially connected Hartford, Connecticut. In 2010, his design won another AIA Honor Award and in 2011 was awarded an Our Town Award from the National Endowment for the Arts.

In 2014, Suisman began working with renowned environmental graphic designer Kim Baer of KBDA to revitalize the campus of the La Brea Tar Pits and Museum in Los Angeles. Together they helped the site's owner, the Los Angeles County Natural History Museum, create a fresh image and enhanced visitor experience by renovating several pavilions and the museums itself, and introducing colorful wayfinding and information graphics across the campus.

Beginning in 2017, working with the iQuilt Partnership, Suisman began developing the regional vision for the Hartford region that became known as Hartford400. In 2022, the plan was recognized with the 2022 Honor Award in Urban Design by the American Institute of Architects California. In the same year, the plan was awarded the Witte-Sakamoto Family Medal in City and Regional Planning by University of Pennsylvania Stuart Weitzman School of Design.

== Publications ==
BOOKS

“Los Angeles Boulevard - 25th Anniversary Edition”

ORO Editions: 2014

“The Arc: A Formal Structure for a Palestinian State”

RAND Corporation Santa Monica: 2005

“Los Angeles Boulevard”

Los Angeles Forum for Architecture and Urban Design Los Angeles: 1989

ARTICLES AND ESSAYS

“My Boulevards”

Boom - The Magazine of California: Spring 2016

“Reviving the North Side's 'Lost City”

Pittsburgh Post Gazette: April 2007

“Portals Not Pillories: The Bus Stop as Public Place”

Architecture California Magazine: Spring 2001

“The Bus Stop as an Urban Place”

Places Magazine New York: Summer 1997

“Plaza Mexicana”

Places Magazine New York: April 1993

== Professional affiliations ==
Fellow of the American Institute of Architects

National Peer in Urban Design for the U.S. General Services Administration

Advisory Committee Member of the Sustainable Development Code

== Personal life ==
Suisman resides in Santa Monica, California with his wife and two children.
