= Culver CityBus =

Public transit bus agency serving western neighborhoods in Los Angeles County, CA

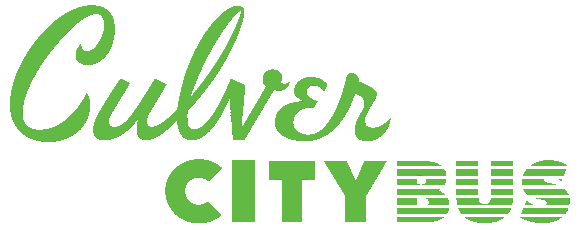

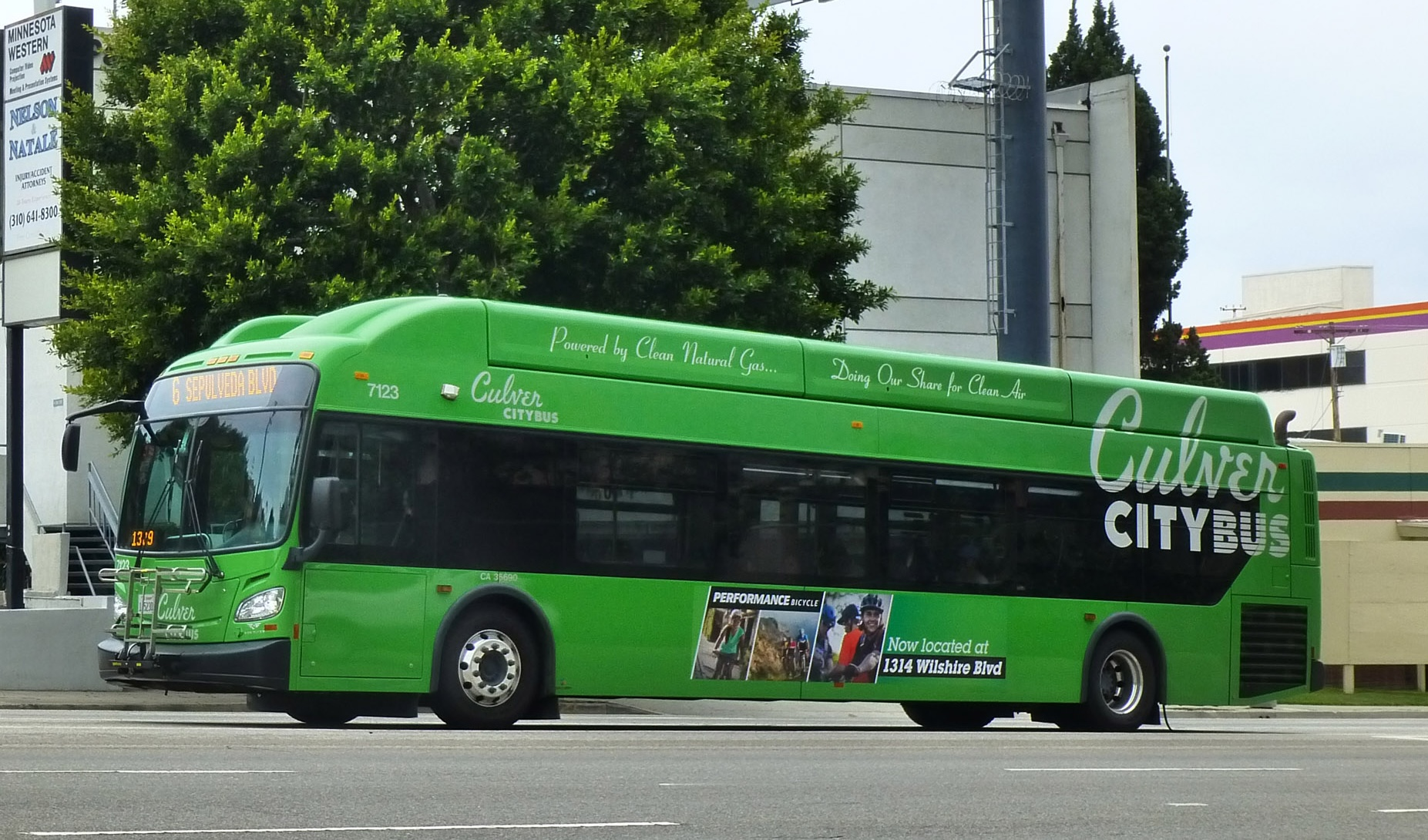
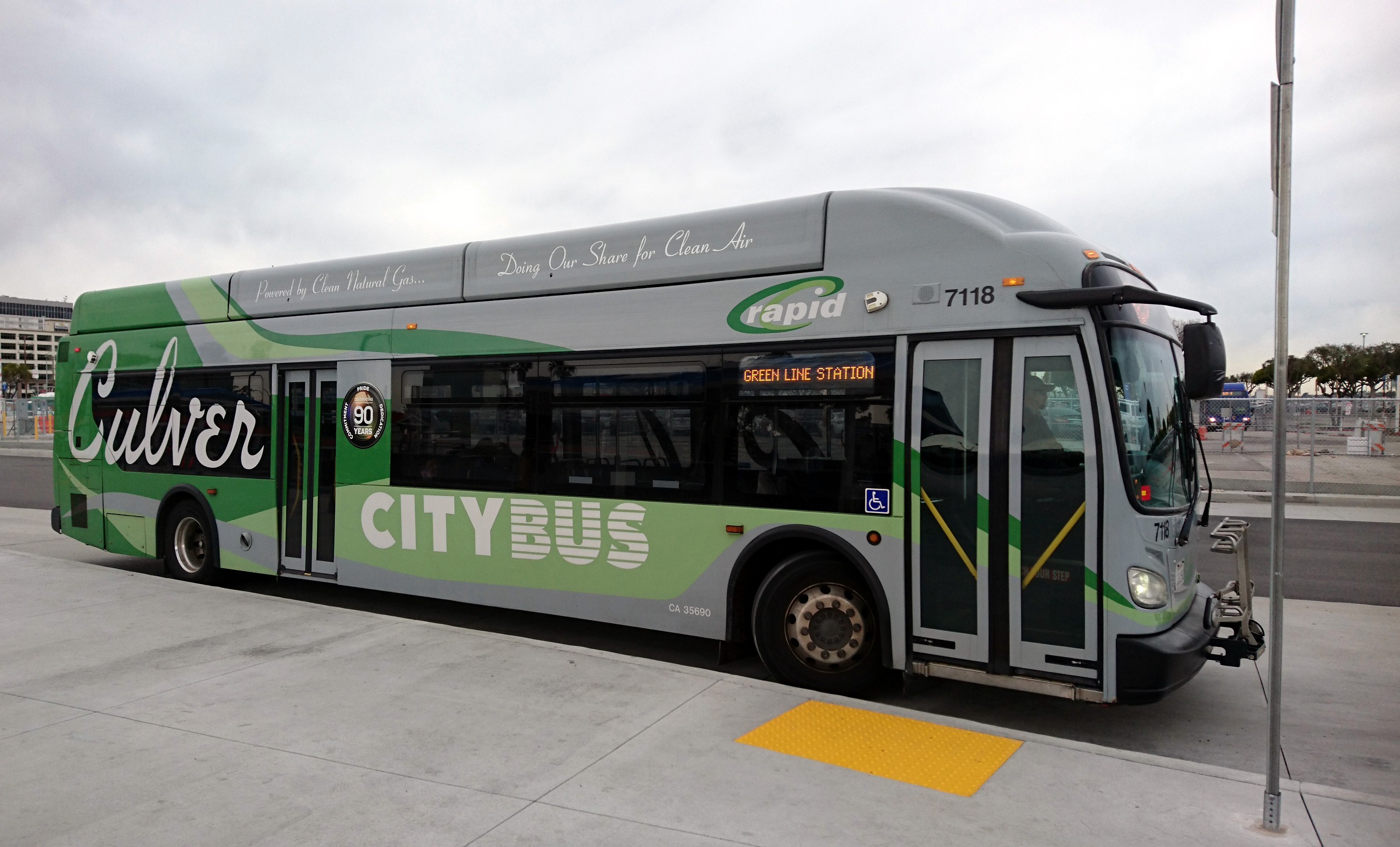
- Culver CityBus services: local and Rapid
- Founded: 3 March 1928
- Headquarters: 4343 Duquesne Avenue, Culver City, California
- Locale: Southern California
- Service area: Los Angeles County
- Service type: Bus service
- Routes: 10 local, 1 Rapid
- Fleet: 56 buses
- Daily ridership: 11,000 (weekdays, Q2 2026)
- Annual ridership: 3,361,200 (2025)
- Fuel type: CNG, battery electric
- Operator: City of Culver City Transportation Department
- Website: culvercitybus.org

Culver CityBus is a public transport agency operating in Culver City, California, currently serving Culver City, the unincorporated community of Marina del Rey, and the adjacent Los Angeles neighborhoods.

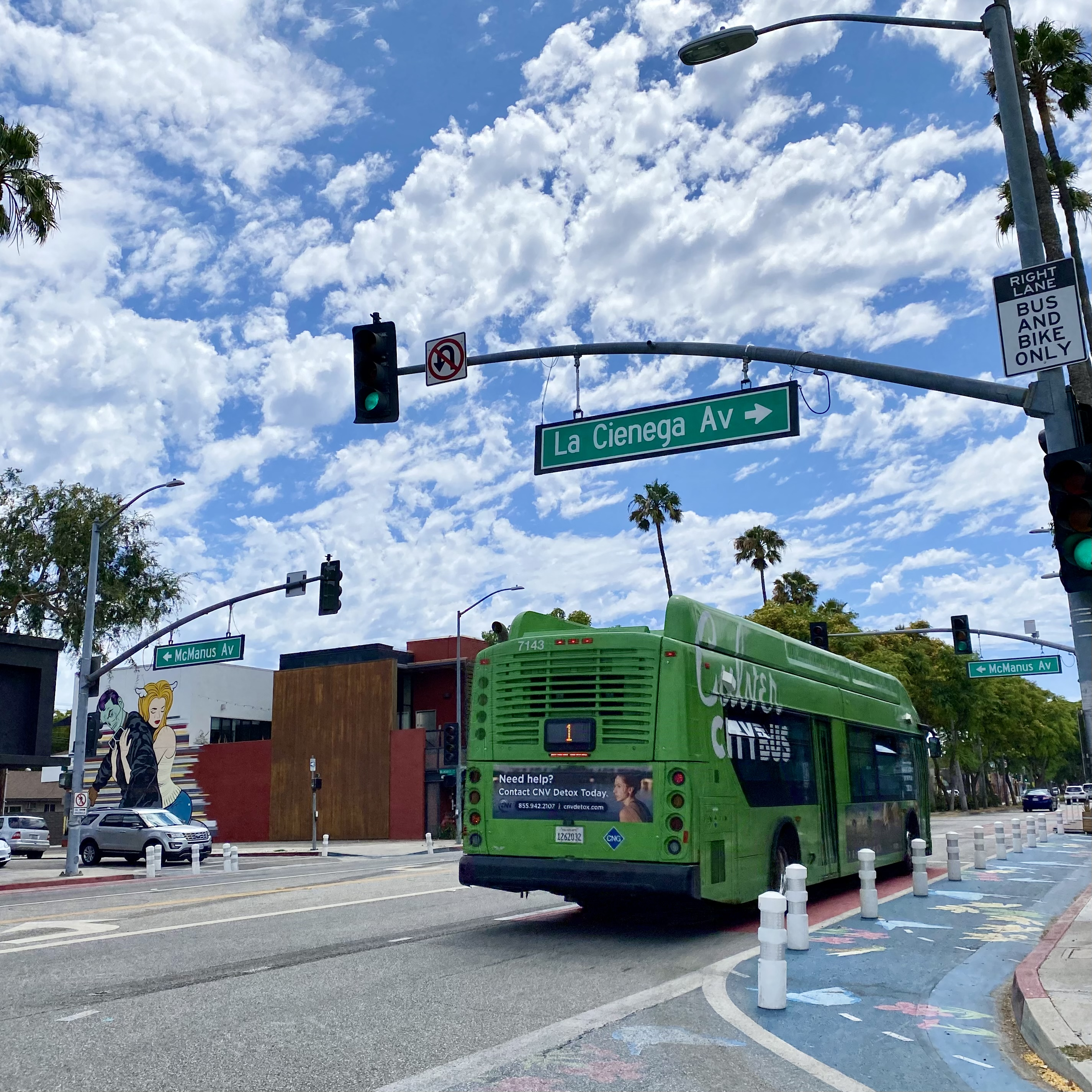
Culver CityBus bus route number 1 on Washington Blvd. passes a mural by artist D*Face.

Its regular fleet is painted bright green and its rapid fleet primarily a chrome gray, distinguishing it from Santa Monica's Big Blue Bus, orange-colored Metro Local buses, and red-colored Metro Rapid buses, whose coverage areas overlap on Los Angeles's Westside. In 2025, the system had a ridership of 3,361,200, or about 11,000 per weekday as of the second quarter of 2026.

== History ==
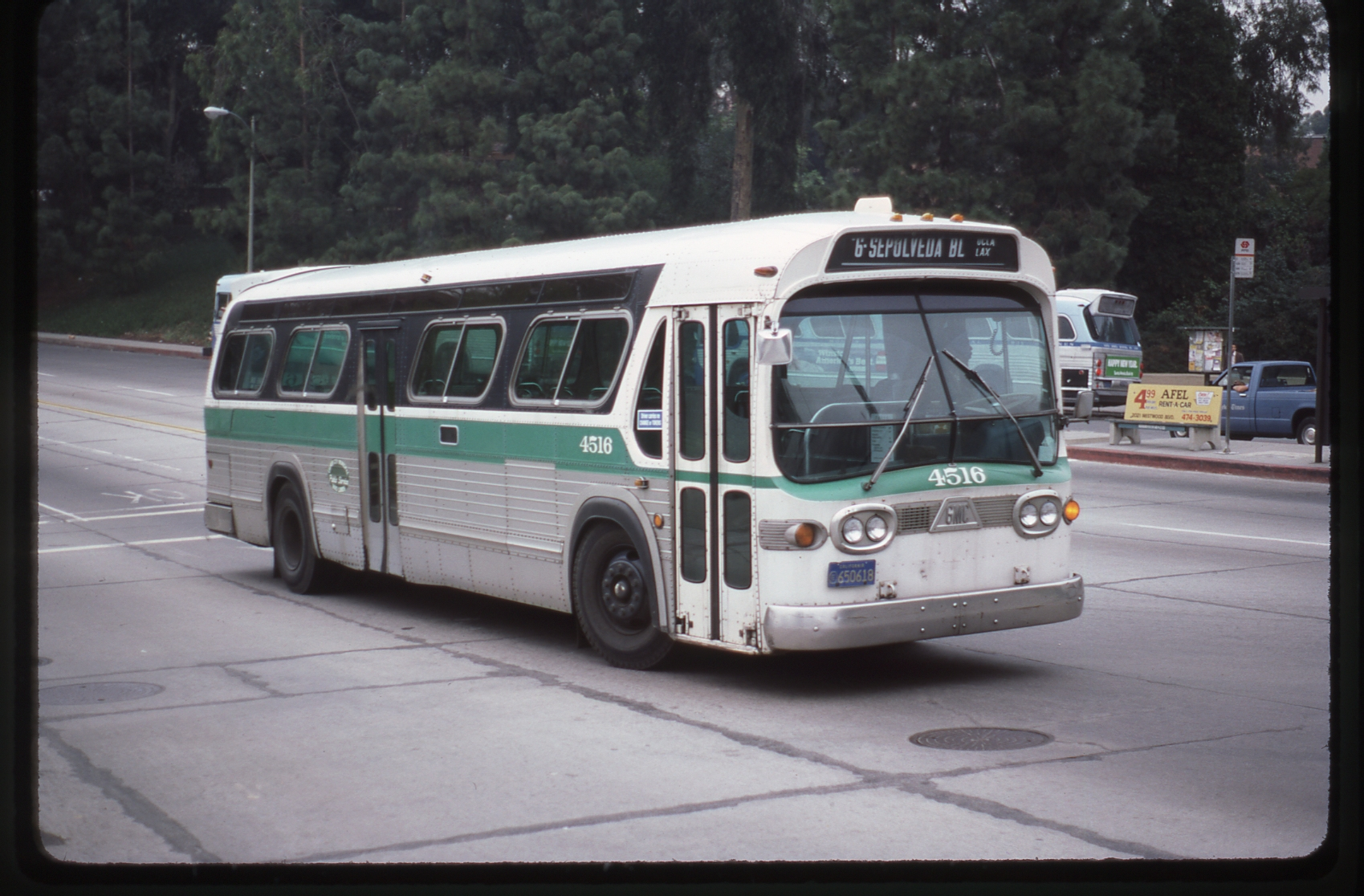
A now-retired GMC New Look bus running on Route 6 of the Culver CityBus.

Culver CityBus was founded on 3 March 1928, making it the second oldest municipal bus line in California and the oldest public transit bus system still operating in Los Angeles County. Big Blue Bus was founded on 14 April 1928, the San Francisco Municipal Railway began streetcar service 28 December 1912.

CityBus participates in the LA Metro system's GoPass program, allowing K-12 and community college students at participating schools to ride the Culver CityBus for free, among 15 other transport services in the county.

== Service area ==
Within its service area of around 25.5 square miles, the Culver CityBus provides service to the communities of:

- Venice
- Westchester
- Westwood
- West Los Angeles
- Palms
- Playa Vista
- Marina del Rey
- Mar Vista
- Century City
- Culver City

== Routes ==
Culver CityBus operates 3 daily routes, 3 weekday-only routes, and 2 Monday-Saturday routes within Los Angeles County. Among its 3 weekday-only routes, Culver CityBus operates a Rapid route (Rapid 6). Weekend service is provided on New Year's Day, Memorial Day, Independence Day, Labor Day, Thanksgiving Day and Christmas Day.

=== Local routes ===
Route	Terminals		Via	Notes
1	Los Angeles; Washington/Fairfax Transit Hub	Venice; Windward Av & Main St	Washington Bl	Serves Culver City station
1C1	Culver City; Culver Bl & Overland Av	Culver City; Washington Bl & La Cienega Av	Culver Bl, Washington Bl	Downtown circulator route; Serves Culver City station; Route to be discontinued in the near future.
2	Culver City; Bristol Pkwy & Centinela Av	Venice; Venice High School	Inglewood Bl	
3	Century City; Westfield Century City	Culver City; Mesmer Av & Major St	Westwood Bl, Motor Av, Overland Av	Serves Westwood/Rancho Park station, West Los Angeles College and Culver City Transit Center; Route to be extended to Downtown Inglewood station in the near future
4	Los Angeles; Washington/Fairfax Transit Hub	Playa Vista; Waters Edge Wy & Jefferson Bl	Jefferson Bl	Serves La Cienega/Jefferson station, West Los Angeles College and Culver City Transit Center
6	Westwood; UCLA	Los Angeles; LAX/Metro Transit Center	Sepulveda Bl	Serves Expo/Sepulveda station and Culver City Transit Center; Operates alongside Rapid 6; To be merged with Rapid 6 in the near future.
7	Culver City; Culver City station	Marina del Rey; Fisherman's Village	Culver Bl	

=== School supplementary routes ===
Only operates when school is in session

Route	Terminals		Via	Notes
5	Culver City; Culver City High School	Blair Hills; La Cienega Bl & Rodeo Rd	Braddock Dr	Operates 1 westbound AM trip and 2 eastbound PM trips; One eastbound PM trip departs from Venice High School
5	Venice; Venice High School	Blair Hills; La Cienega Bl & Rodeo Rd	Braddock Dr	Operates 1 westbound AM trip and 2 eastbound PM trips; One eastbound PM trip departs from Venice High School
5C1	Culver City; Culver City High School	Culver City; Washington Bl & Roverts Av	Braddock Dr	Operates 2 westbound AM trips and 2 eastbound PM trips
5C2	Culver City; Culver City High School	Culver City; Pepperdine University	Overland Av	Operates 1 northbound AM trip and 2 southbound PM trips

=== Rapid routes ===
Route	Terminals		Via	Noets
Rapid 6	Westwood; UCLA	Los Angeles LAX/Metro Transit Center	Sepulveda Bl	Serves Expo/Sepulveda station; Operates alongside Route 6

== Bus fleet ==
=== Active fleet ===
Culver CityBus also maintains a fleet of largely electric circulator vans (used on its downtown circulator routes, for example 1C1) and support and paratransit vehicles including Nissan Leaf's and electric vans.

Make/Model	Fleet numbers	Thumbnail	Year	Engines	Transmission	Notes
New Flyer C40LFR	7106-7111		2009	Cummins Westport ISL G	Allison B400R	All are in the Rapid livery
New Flyer XN40	7112		2010	Cummins Westport ISL G	Allison B400R	
New Flyer XN40	7113-7115		2011	Cummins Westport ISL G	Allison B400R	
New Flyer XN40	7116-7131		2012	Cummins Westport ISL G	Allison B400R	
New Flyer XN40	7132-7137		2014	Cummins Westport ISL G	Allison B400R	
New Flyer XN40	7138-7155		2017	Cummins Westport ISL G NZ	Allison B400R	
New Flyer XE40	7156–7159		2021			

=== Future ===
Culver CityBus has announced intentions to replace its entire fleet with battery-electric buses by 2028, in time for the 100th anniversary of its founding and the 2028 Olympic Games, while avoiding early retirement of its current fleet, assuming a 12-year useful service life.

Culver CityBus was slated to receive 6 additional battery electric buses in 2022 from New Flyer. However, the agency canceled the order and abandoned their 2028 electrification commitment. In December 2024, the agency released a new rollout plan, which directs the agency to continue procuring CNG buses in the meantime. Despite being a smaller transit agency, Culver CityBus lags behind neighboring agencies such as LA Metro, Gtrans, and Big Blue Bus, who have committed to electrification by 2035, 2034, and 2030, respectively. Those agencies have begun electrification of their depots and have Battery Electric Buses in regular service, which Culver CityBus does not.

As of December 2024, their new rollout plan abandons the purchase of battery electric buses on a yearly basis through 2028 and instead delays their electrification commitment to 2040. As a result, Culver CityBus will be the last agency in the larger LA metropolitan area to operate CNG buses.

Planned future purchases
Vehicle Length	Quantity	Year	Powertrain	Notes
40ft	6	2025	CNG	Contract awarded to Gillig in August 2025
Cutaway	3	2025	CNG	
40ft	2	2025	Fuel Cell	
40ft	14	2026	CNG	
40ft	6	2026	Battery Electric	
40ft	8	2027	CNG	
40ft	4	2027	Battery Electric	
40ft	8	2028	CNG	
40ft	4	2028	Battery Electric	
40ft	12	2029	Fuel Cell	
40ft	6	2030	Fuel Cell	
40ft	6	2031	Fuel Cell	
40ft	12	2032	Battery Electric	
40ft	12	2033	Fuel Cell	
Cutaway	3	2035	Battery Electric	
Cutaway	3	2035	Fuel Cell	
40ft	12	2036	Battery Electric	
40ft	18	2037	Battery Electric	
40ft	22	2038	Battery Electric	
40ft	10	2038	Fuel Cell	
40ft	8	2039	Battery Electric	
40ft	21	2039	Fuel Cell	
40ft	6	2040	Battery Electric	
40ft	3	2040	Fuel Cell	
