= Westwood/Rancho Park station =

Los Angeles Metro Rail station

Westwood/Rancho Park
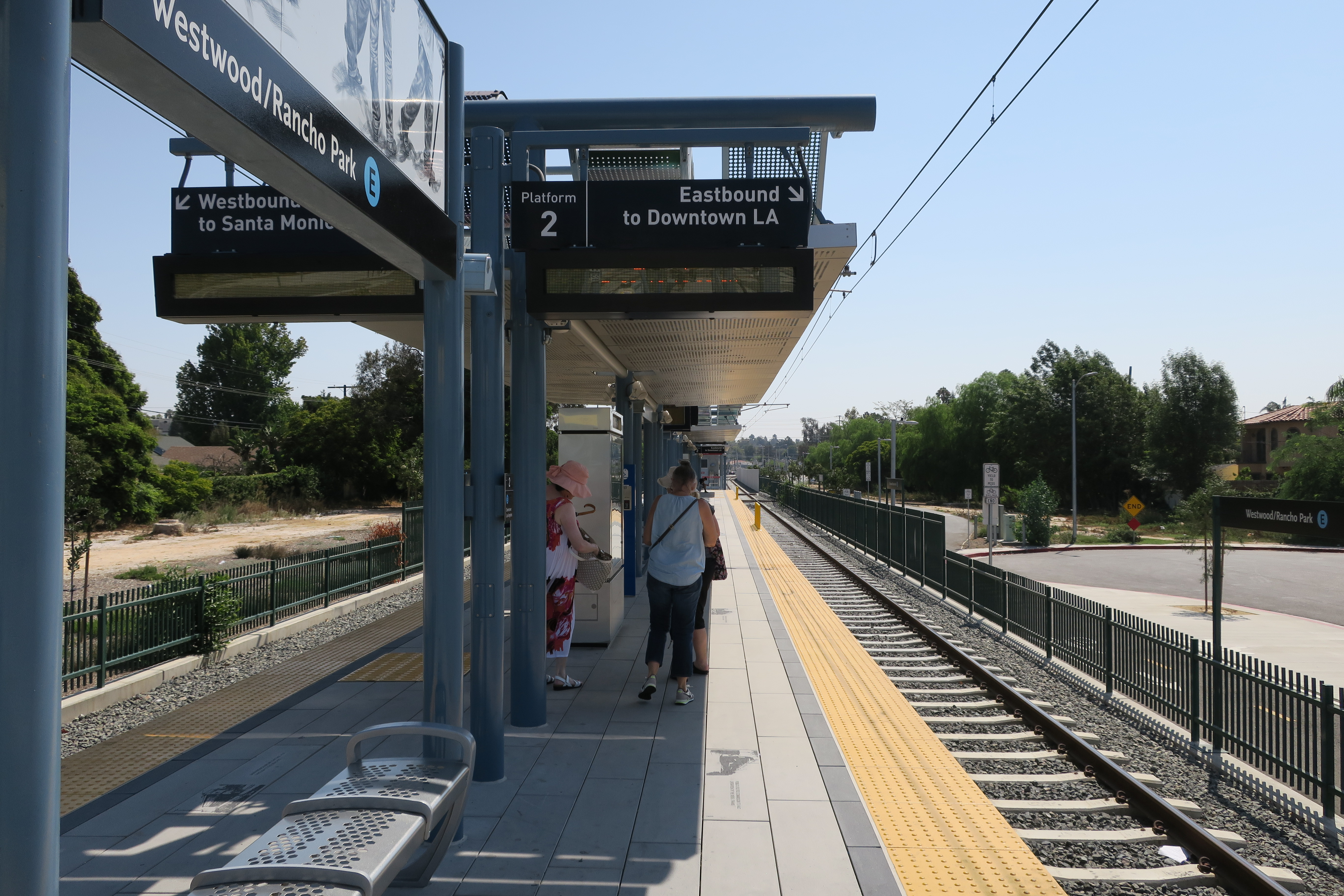
- The platform at Westwood/Rancho Park looking eastbound, July 2016

General information
- Location: 2594 Westwood Boulevard; Los Angeles, California
- Coordinates: 34.0368°N 118.4258°W
- Owner: Los Angeles County Metropolitan Transportation Authority
- Platforms: 1 island platform
- Tracks: 2
- Connections: Big Blue Bus; Culver CityBus

Construction
- Cycle facilities: Metro Bike Share station, racks and lockers
- Accessible: Yes

History
- Opened: October 17, 1875
- Rebuilt: May 20, 2016
- Former names: Talamantes

Passengers
- FY 2025: 1,168 (avg. wkdy boardings)

Services
Preceding station	Metro Rail	Following station
Expo/Sepulveda toward Santa Monica	E Line	Palms toward East LA
Former services
Preceding station	Pacific Electric	Following station
Home Junction toward Rustic Canyon	Air Line	Palms toward Pacific Electric Building
Location

Westwood/Rancho Park station is an at-grade light rail station in the Los Angeles Metro Rail system located at the intersection of Westwood Boulevard and Exposition Boulevard in the Rancho Park neighborhood of West Los Angeles, California. It serves the E Line. The station connects to the UCLA campus via the Big Blue Bus Rapid 12 and Route 8 lines.

Although opponents filed a lawsuit to halt construction, they were ultimately unsuccessful in their efforts (see Opposition section, below).

== Service ==
=== Station layout ===
Westwood/Rancho Park Station is located at Exposition Boulevard just east of Westwood Boulevard, between Westwood Boulevard and Overland Avenue. This station is located in Rancho Park, an affluent single-family neighborhood south of Westwood and southwest of Century City. The station location is a short walk from the Westside Pavilion shopping mall.

The final environmental impact report included 170 surface parking spaces at this station, with an option to remove all parking for transit users (20 parking spaces would be provided for local residents only). In March 2011, the Expo Board approved the no-parking option. Sepulveda station, less than one mile away, has a parking lot.

=== Hours and frequency ===
E Line service hours are from approximately 4:30 a.m. and 11:45 p.m daily. Trains operate every 8 minutes during peak hours, Monday to Friday. Trains run every 10 minutes, during midday on weekdays and weekends, from 9:00 a.m. to 7:00 p.m. Night and early morning service is approximately every 20 minutes every day.

=== Connections ===
As of December 15, 2024, the following connections are available:

- Big Blue Bus (Santa Monica): 8, Rapid 12
- Culver CityBus: 3

== Opposition ==
In the Final EIR, Metro staff recommended routing the Expo Line along the Exposition Right-Of-Way through Rancho Park (which includes Westwood Station), at-grade. During the EIR process, a group of neighbors known as Neighbors For Smart Rail (NFSR) organized to oppose at-grade light rail through this ROW. The group claims that this design will be dangerous if built as specified, and that Metro failed to comply with environmental law. Metro publicly disputed these claims, as did several groups supporting the current design.

On March 5, 2010, NFSR filed a lawsuit to halt construction of Expo Phase 2. This lawsuit was dismissed by the Superior Court of the State of California on February 22, 2011.

== Attractions ==
The Westwood Neighborhood Greenway, a linear park built on unused right-of-way and planted with native species, is located next to this station.
