= Big Blue Bus =

Bus service serving Santa Monica and surrounding region in Los Angeles, California

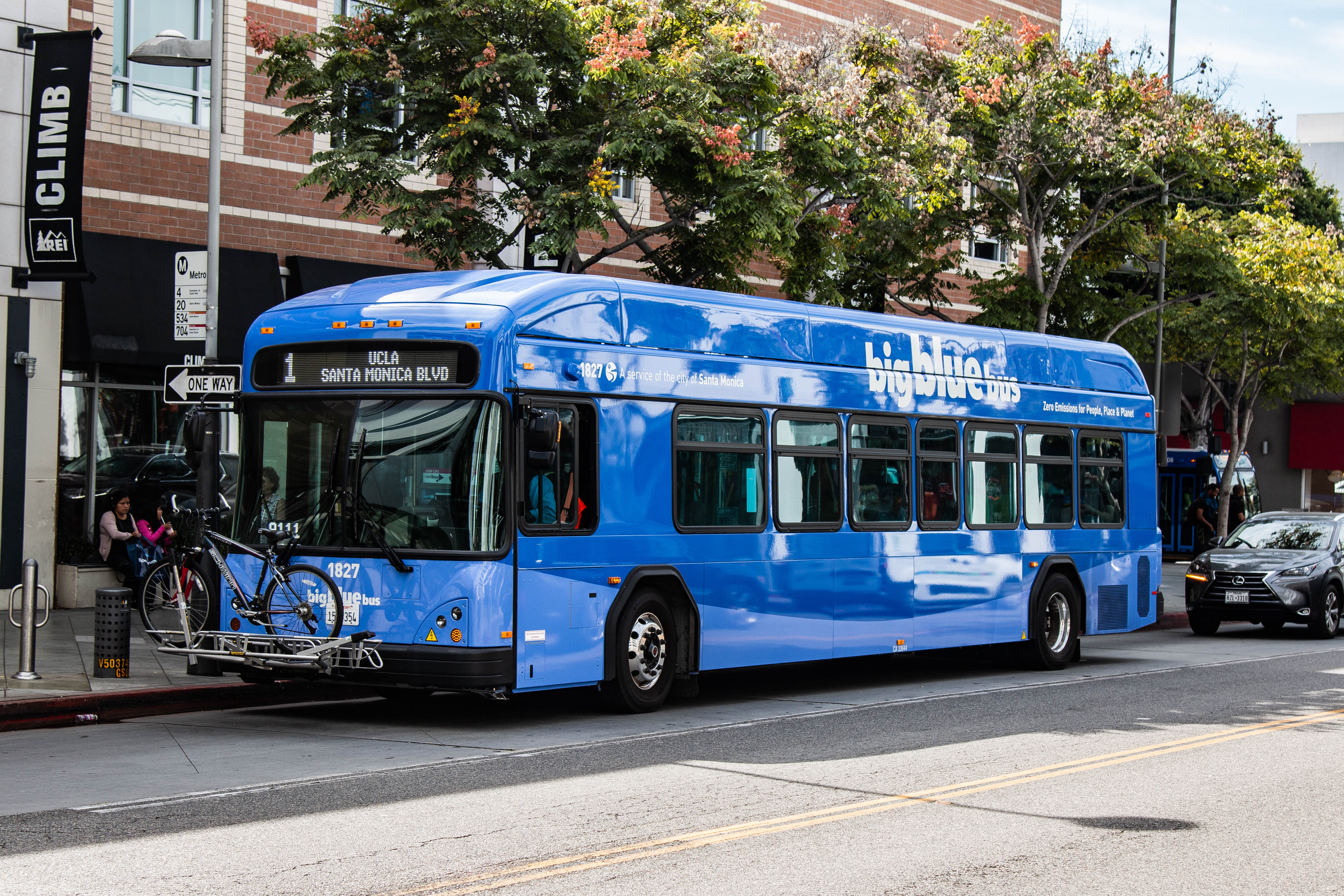
- Big Blue Bus route 1 on Santa Monica Boulevard, en route to UCLA
- Parent: City of Santa Monica, Department of Transportation
- Founded: 1928 (as Santa Monica Municipal Bus Lines)
- Headquarters: Santa Monica, California
- Locale: Santa Monica, Westwood, and Venice, California
- Service type: Local bus; Limited-stop bus
- Routes: 17
- Fleet: 195
- Daily ridership: 33,900 (weekdays, Q2 2026)
- Annual ridership: 9,968,400 (2025)
- Fuel type: CNG, Electric
- Chief executive: Anuj Gupta
- Website: bigbluebus.com

Big Blue Bus (stylized in lowercase) is a public transit agency that provides public bus services for the city of Santa Monica and the greater Westside region of Los Angeles County, California. The service, operated by the city of Santa Monica, was founded on April 14, 1928, and throughout its existence has used a blue color scheme for its buses, leading to the Big Blue Bus nickname that would later become the official name of the agency. In 2025, the system had a total ridership of 10,100,208 with an average weekday ridership of 32,772. Big Blue Bus receives funding from the Los Angeles County Metropolitan Transportation Authority (Metro) and offers connections to its Metro Bus and Metro Rail systems, but is operated independently from Metro.

== History ==
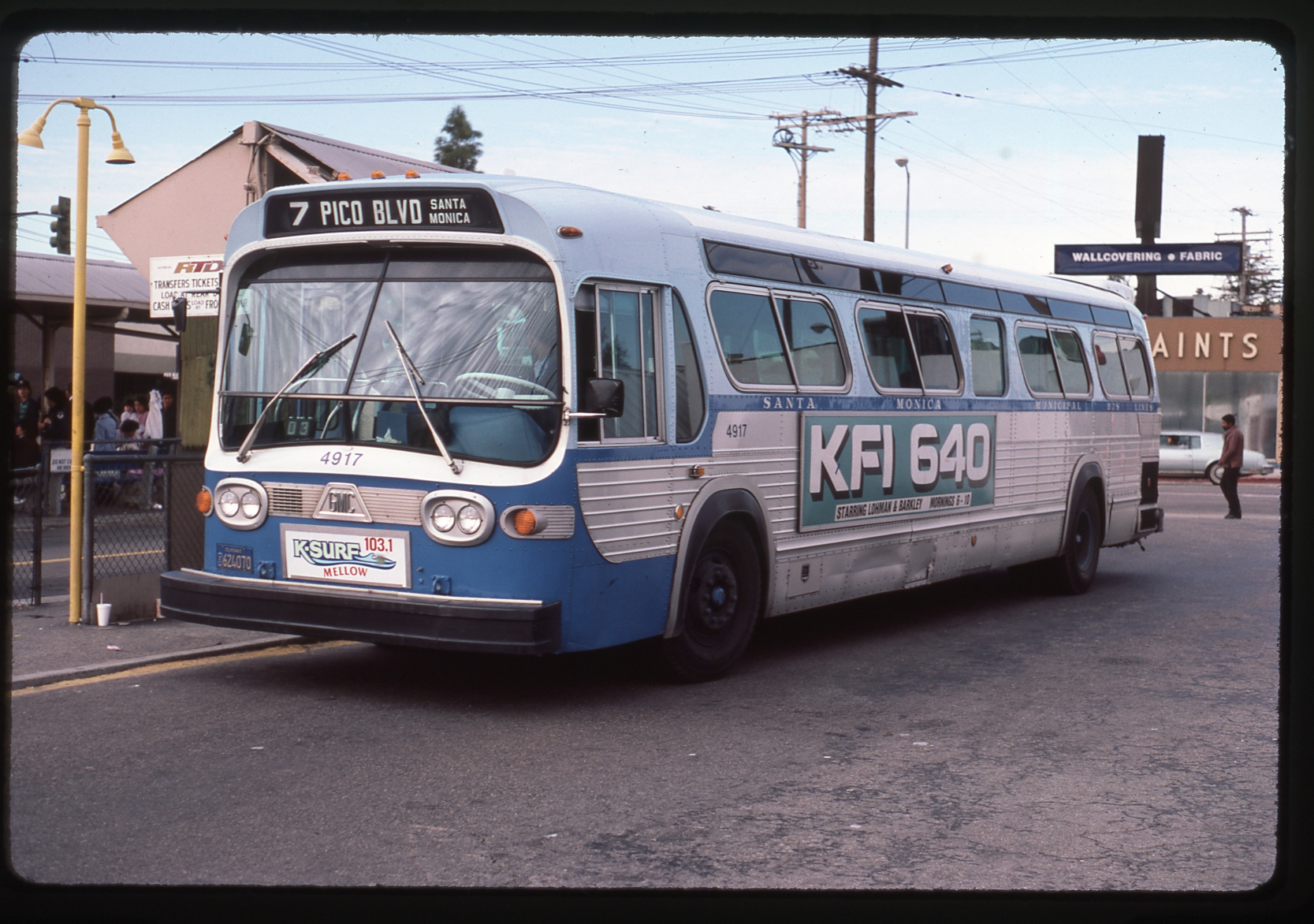
A now-retired GMC "New Look" bus in service for what was then-called the "Santa Monica Municipal Bus Lines".

The agency was founded on April 14, 1928, as the Santa Monica Municipal Bus Lines and the agency picked a unique blue color scheme for its buses, later leading to the Big Blue Bus nickname. It holds the distinction of being the second oldest public transit bus system still operating in Los Angeles County; only the neighboring Culver CityBus (founded March 4, 1928) is older.

Santa Monica established the bus line in response to a fare increase on the Pacific Electric interurban trains between Santa Monica and Los Angeles.

While independent from other agencies in the Los Angeles area, the Big Blue Bus has always offered connections to the other systems, most notably near the intersections of Pico and Rimpau Boulevards in the Mid-City section of Los Angeles. The historic transfer point was established by Santa Monica, the Los Angeles Railway and Pacific Electric Railway and is known today as the Pico/Rimpau Transit Center and is used the Big Blue Bus and Metro Bus.

In 1978, Santa Monica became the first transit operator in California to operate a bus with a wheelchair lift, the Grumman-Flxible Model 870. It was the third agency to order the bus after Atlanta's MARTA, and Connecticut's CT Transit. The Big Blue Bus was one of the last transit agencies using the iconic GMC New Look "fishbowl" bus, the last of which was retired in 2005.

The Big Blue Bus has been honored with the American Public Transportation Association’s Outstanding Transportation System award in 1987, 1992, 1997, 2000 and 2011.

== Routes ==
Big Blue Bus operates 18 bus lines: 12 regular routes, 2 rapid routes, and 1 circulator route. On weekends and holidays with weekend service, the agency operates 10 bus lines: 9 regular routes and 1 rapid route.

In 2024, the agency underwent a COA (Comprehensive Operational Analysis) which will inform service and route changes over the next five years. These aim to help the agency better connect with future Metro Rail extensions, most notably the D and K lines, adjust to new travel patterns, increase service frequency, and make service blocks compatible with a zero emissions bus fleet.

=== Local routes ===
Sunday schedules are operated on New Year's Day, Memorial Day, Independence Day, Labor Day, Thanksgiving Day and Christmas Day.

Route	Terminals		Via	Days of Operation^{#}	Notes
1	Westwood; UCLA	Venice; Grand Bl & Riviera Av	Santa Monica Bl, Main St	Daily	Operates alongside LA Metro 4 (24‑hour service); Serves Downtown Santa Monica station
2	Westwood; UCLA	Santa Monica; Main St & Olympic Dr	Wilshire Bl	Daily	Operates alongside LA Metro 20 (24‑hour service); Operates alongside LA Metro Rapid 720; Serves Downtown Santa Monica station
3	Santa Monica; Arizona Av & 5th St	Westchester; LAX/Metro Transit Center	Lincoln Bl	Daily	Serves Loyola Marymount University, and Downtown Santa Monica station
5	Santa Monica; Santa Monica College	Palms; Palms station	Olympic Bl, Motor Av	Weekdays	Serves 17th Street/SMC station, 26th Street/Bergamot station, Expo/Bundy station and Westfield Century City
7	Santa Monica; 7th St & Olympic Bl	Mid-Wilshire; Wilshire/Western station	Pico Bl	Daily	Serves Santa Monica College, Expo/Sepulveda, Downton Santa Monica station and Rimpau Transit Center
8	Santa Monica; 7th St & Olympic Bl	Westwood; UCLA (Gateway Plaza)	Ocean Park Bl	Daily	Serves Westwood/Rancho Park
9	Pacific Palisades; Sunset Bl & Marquez Av	Santa Monica; Main St & Olympic Dr	Sunset Bl, Chatauqua Bl, 4th St	Daily	Serves Downtown Santa Monica station
14	Brentwood; Bringham Av & Gorham Av	Culver City Mall; Culver City Transit Center	Bundy Dr, Centinela Av	Daily	Select trips extend from Brentwood north to Paul Revere Middle School; Serves Expo/Bundy station and Santa Monica College Bundy Campus
15	Brentwood; Barrington Pl & Chayote St	West LA; Expo/Bundy station (Pico Bl & Bundy Dr)	Barrington Av	Weekdays	
16	Playa del Rey; Culver Bl & Vista Del Mar	West LA; Saltair Av & Wilshire Bl	Walgrove Av, 23rd St, 20th St	Weekdays	Serves 26th Street/Bergamot station and Loyola Marymount University
17	Westwood; UCLA (Macgowan Hall)	Culver City Culver City station	Sawtelle Bl, Palms Bl	Daily	Serves Expo/Sepulveda station and Palms station
18	Westwood; UCLA	Marina Del Rey; Via Marina & Admiralty Wy	Montana Av, 4th St	Daily	Serves Downtown Santa Monica Station
41	Santa Monica; Santa Monica College		14th St, 20th St	Weekdays	Service operates in a clockwise loop and terminates at 14th St & Pico Bl; Serves 17th Street/SMC station
43	Santa Monica; Santa Monica College	Santa Monica; Main St and Olympic Dr	26th St, San Vicente Bl, 4th St	Daily	Select eastbound trips serve Paul Revere Middle School; Serves 26th Street/Bergamot station
44	Santa Monica; 17th Street/SMC station	West LA; Santa Monica College Bundy Campus	Bundy Dr, Ocean Park Bl, 17th St	Weekdays only	Connects 17th Street/Santa Monica College station, Santa Monica College Main Campus, and Santa Monica College Bundy Campus

=== Rapid & Express routes ===
Route	Terminals		Via	Days of Operation	Notes
Express 9	Pacific Palisades; Sunset Bl & Marquez Av	Santa Monica; 4th & Colorado	Pacific Coast Highway	School days	To/from Palisades Charter High School; After suspension in early 2025, service was restored January 27th, 2026.
Rapid 10	Santa Monica; Broadway & 5th St	Downtown LA; Main St & Alameda St	In Santa Monica: Santa Monica Bl, Bundy Dr; Express Portion: I-10; In Downtown LA: Grand Av/Olive St, Figueroa St/Flower St, Temple St	Weekday, peak hours	Operates into Downtown LA in the AM rush and into Downtown Santa Monica in the PM rush; Serves Expo/Bundy station and Los Angeles Union Station
Rapid 12	Westwood; UCLA (Gateway Plaza)	Palms; Overland Av & Venice Bl	Westwood Bl, Overland Av	Daily	Serves Westwood/Rancho Park station

== Bus fleet ==
Big Blue Bus currently maintains a fleet of 195 buses of various lengths including 29', 40', and 60' articulated, with 35-footers set to be delivered in 2025. In 2018, Big Blue Bus received its last ever internal combustion vehicle. In 2023, 19 buses out of its total fleet were battery-electric, but with the addition of 15 new buses in 2025, that number is now 34. All buses feature destination signs. Newer buses (units 1801 and later) feature white LED destination signs, while older units feature a variety of other colors. In 2024, the fleet was equipped with passenger information displays in place of the older dot-light signs. These are part of a fleet-wide communications system replacement with Clever Devices systems. The passenger displays currently feature a three-day weather forecast, upcoming stops with time to arrival, and the line's final destination. As part of this upgrade, electric buses also gain access to Clever's EV fleet integration software during the agency's transition to a zero-emissions fleet. This also enables vehicles to generate more frequent and accurate GPS data for tracking purposes, such as the Transit app. Buses 1808 and newer were equipped with free passenger Wi-Fi at delivery; this was added to the rest of the fleet with the installation of the new fleet comms systems.

Big Blue Bus has evaluated two main options for zero-emissions propulsion of its buses in an effort to decarbonize its fleet by 2030. Both hydrogen fuel cell and battery-electric buses have been considered. The agency has determined that battery-electric buses can replace their CNG buses at current service levels with a 1:1 replacement ratio. The agency has subsequently delayed its fleet electrification deadline to 2032.

=== Active fleet ===
Fleet numbers	Thumbnail	Make/Model	Year	Engine	Transmission
1300		Gillig BRT CNG 40'	2012	Cummins Westport ISL-G	Voith D864.5
1301-1344	Ocean Park Blvd	Gillig BRT CNG 40'	2013	Cummins Westport ISL-G	Voith D864.5
1345-1357	2 Santa Monica via Wilshire	Gillig BRT CNG 40'	2014	Cummins Westport ISL-G	Voith D864.5
1500-1510		Gillig BRT CNG 40'	2015	Cummins Westport ISL-G	Allison B400R
1560-1566		New Flyer XN60	2015	Cummins Westport ISL-G	Allison B500R
1600–1603		Gillig BRT CNG 29'	2016	Cummins Westport ISL-G	Allison B300R
1701-1705		Gillig BRT CNG 40'	2016	Cummins Westport ISL-G	Allison B400R
1706-1725	Fuera de Servicio	Gillig BRT CNG 40'	2017	Cummins Westport ISL-G NZ	Allison B400R
1801-1807		Gillig BRT CNG 29'	2018	Cummins Westport L9N	Allison B300R
1808-1826	Venice bound	Gillig BRT CNG 40'	2018	Cummins Westport L9N	Allison B400R
1827		Gillig Low Floor Plus 40'	2018	Cummins BES	Direct drive
2101-2118		Gillig Low Floor Plus 40'	2021	Cummins BES	Direct drive
2501-2515	2501 on debut week	Gillig Low Floor Plus 35'	2025	Cummins Accelera	Direct drive
3868-3876		NABI 40-LFW CNG	2011	Cummins Westport ISL G	Allison B400R
5300-5310	5300 on Former Rapid 3	NABI 60-BRT CNG	2010	Cummins Westport ISL-G	Allison B500R
5311-5320		NABI 60-BRT CNG	2011	Cummins Westport ISL-G	Allison B500R

=== On Order ===
Manufacturer	Model	Length (ft)	Year	Quantity (Fleet Numbers)	Powertrain	Notes
Gillig	Low Floor Plus	40	2027	30 (2701–2730)	Electric	Purchased in December 2024; Set to replace all NABI units; Upon delivery, the fleet will be entirely Gillig buses with the exception of 7 New Flyer XN60s; Delivery was originally scheduled to commence at the end of 2026, deferred to mid-2027 due to delayed construction start of additional depot charging
Gillig	Low Floor Plus	40	2028	40 (2801–2840)	Electric	Purchased in August 2026 with delivery slated for mid-2028

=== Retired ===
Manufacturer	Model	Length (ft)	Fleet numbers	Thumbnail	Notes
ENC	E-Z Rider II BRT	30	2900-2914		Some units (most notably 2903) were donated to Los Angeles County Metropolitan Transportation Authority (Metro) ahead of the 2028 Olympics; Replaced by 35-footers as of May 2025; Originally powered with a gasoline electric hybrid system. Later converted to CNG.

=== Future and electrification ===
Following the success of Big Blue Bus' pilot with a prototype Gillig/Cummins BEB (unit 1827), the agency committed to only purchasing zero-emission vehicles moving forward. Big Blue Bus charges its electric fleet with 100 percent renewable energy. The second batch of battery-electric buses are expected in 2025. The agency has set itself a 2030 deadline for full conversion to zero-emissions operation, which as of February 2023, it has determined it can achieve with exclusively battery-electric buses.

The agency is slated to replace vehicles as they reach the end of their useful service lives. Next to be replaced are El Dorado 32' BRT models, with delivery of replacement Gillig 35' Low Floor EVs slated for 2025. The agency's fleet of remaining NABI vehicles is the next group of buses to be replaced.

Due to dynamic service changes, the impact of the COVID-19 pandemic, and ridership changes, amongst other factors, the agency is pursuing a more dynamic fleet replacement timeline than that which was outlined in their original CARB document. The agency has delayed its fleet electrification commitment to 2031.

== Incidents ==
On November 20, 2012, a Big Blue Bus turned left in front of an oncoming motorcyclist, which resulted in the 25-year-old man's death. The accident occurred at approximately 10:33 a.m. at the triangular intersection of Sunset Boulevard and Marquez in the Pacific Palisades. Only buses are allowed to make the left turn, a maneuver that has been determined to be too dangerous for other vehicles.

On June 7, 2013, Bus 4057 of Big Blue Bus was among several vehicles fired at during a thirteen-minute killing spree that left six people dead, including the gunman, and four others wounded. Three women suffered minor injuries aboard the bus, one from shrapnel-type injuries and the other two from injuries unrelated to the gunfire. Approximately two dozen people were inside the bus at the time of the shooting. The attack on Bus 4057 marked the first time a Big Blue Bus came under attack by a gunman in its 85-year service.

On the morning of January 7th, 2025, service on Route 9 was discontinued due to the Palisades Fire. Service was truncated to San Vicente with a modified schedule and restored Tuesday, January 21st, 2025. Express service was restored on January 27, 2026, with the reopening of the Palisades High School campus.

== In popular culture ==
=== Speed ===
Two humorous slogans Santa Monica Bank used on Big Blue Buses appeared in the film Speed. The bus operator in the movie is called the Santa Monica Intercity Bus Lines, a fictionalized version of the Big Blue Bus's official name, the Santa Monica Municipal Bus Lines.

=== Raymond Chandler ===
In Raymond Chandler's novel Farewell, My Lovely, first published in 1940, he writes as protagonist Philip Marlowe, describing a scene in Bay City (Chandler's version of the City of Santa Monica):

"Outside the narrow street fumed, the sidewalks swarmed with fat stomachs. Across the street a bingo parlor was going full blast and beside it a couple of sailors with girls were coming out of a photographer's shop where they had probably been having their photos taken riding on camels. The voice of the hot dog merchant split the dusk like an axe. A big blue bus blared down the street to the little circle where the street car used to turn on a turntable. I walked that way."

=== Curb Your Enthusiasm ===
In the Curb Your Enthusiasm episode ”Namaste" (season 9, episode 7), Larry David is forced to catch a bus, an activity he is not accustomed to. The endeavor ends with Larry being kicked off the bus. The bus station is the Montana/San-Vincente station in Brentwood which serves lines 14 and 18.

=== The Doors ===
The lyric from The Doors song “The End” “The blue bus is calling us” is sometimes said to refer to the Big Blue Buses but according Ray Manzarek this is apocryphal.
