= Expo/Sepulveda station =

Los Angeles Metro Rail station

Expo/Sepulveda
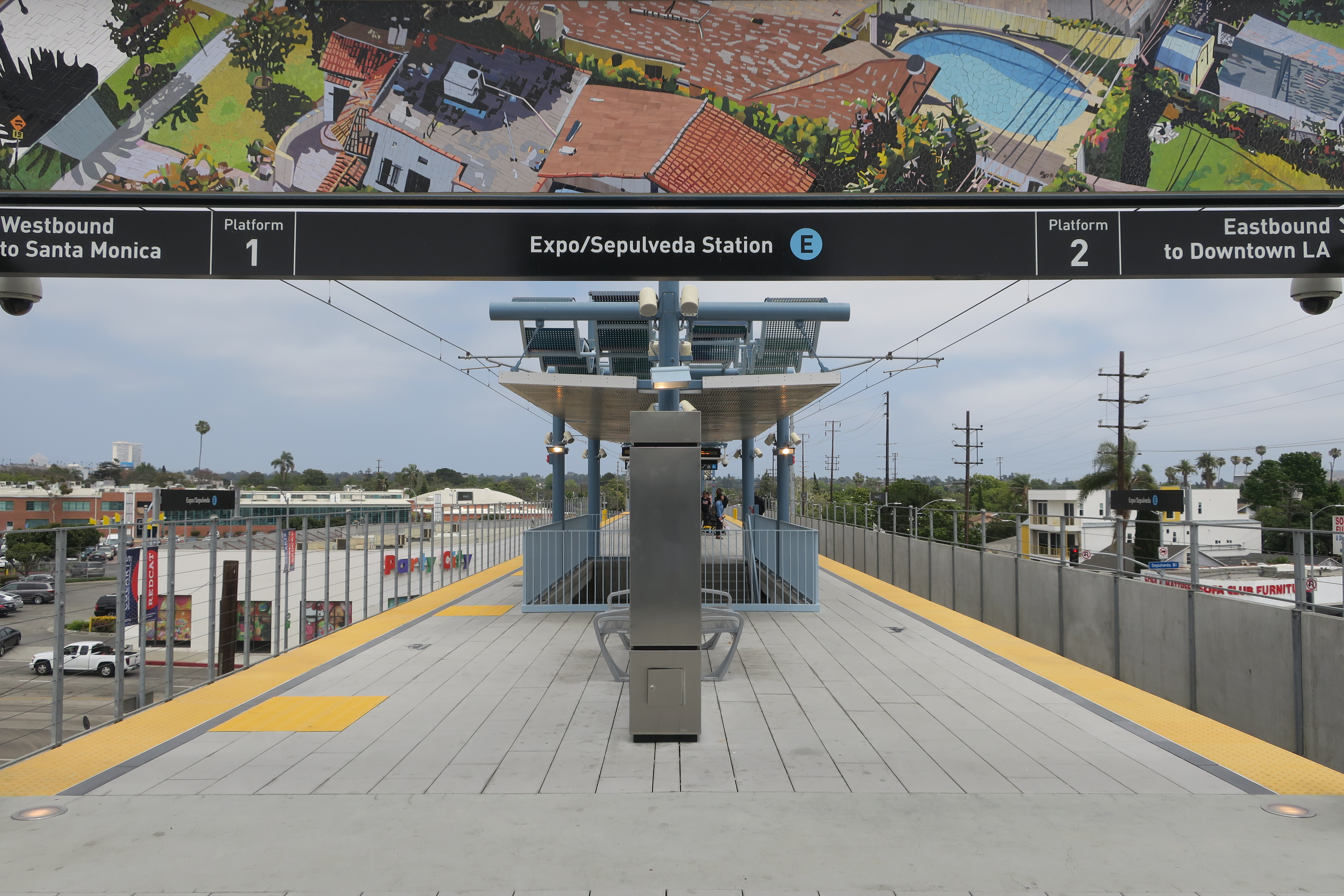
- Expo/Sepulveda station platform in 2017 before system restructuring, with the baby blue E Line coloration.

General information
- Location: 2510 South Sepulveda Boulevard; Los Angeles, California
- Coordinates: 34.0353°N 118.4344°W
- Owner: Los Angeles County Metropolitan Transportation Authority
- Platforms: 1 island platform
- Tracks: 2
- Connections: Big Blue Bus; Culver CityBus; Los Angeles Metro Bus

Construction
- Parking: 260 spaces
- Cycle facilities: Metro Bike Share station, racks and lockers
- Accessible: Yes

History
- Opened: October 17, 1875
- Rebuilt: May 20, 2016
- Former names: Home Junction, Vervain

Passengers
- FY 2025: 1,662 (avg. wkdy boardings)

Services
Preceding station	Metro Rail	Following station
Expo/Bundy toward Santa Monica	E Line	Westwood/Rancho Park toward East LA
Former services
Preceding station	Pacific Electric	Following station
Bundy toward Rustic Canyon	Air Line	Talamantes toward Pacific Electric Building
Soldier's Home Terminus	Air Line Home Branch	Terminus
Location

Expo/Sepulveda station is an elevated light rail station at the intersection of Exposition Boulevard and Sepulveda Boulevard in Los Angeles. It serves the E Line. The station connects to the UCLA campus via the Culver CityBus 6 and Rapid 6 and Metro 761 bus lines, as well as the Santa Monica Big Blue Bus line 17.

== History ==
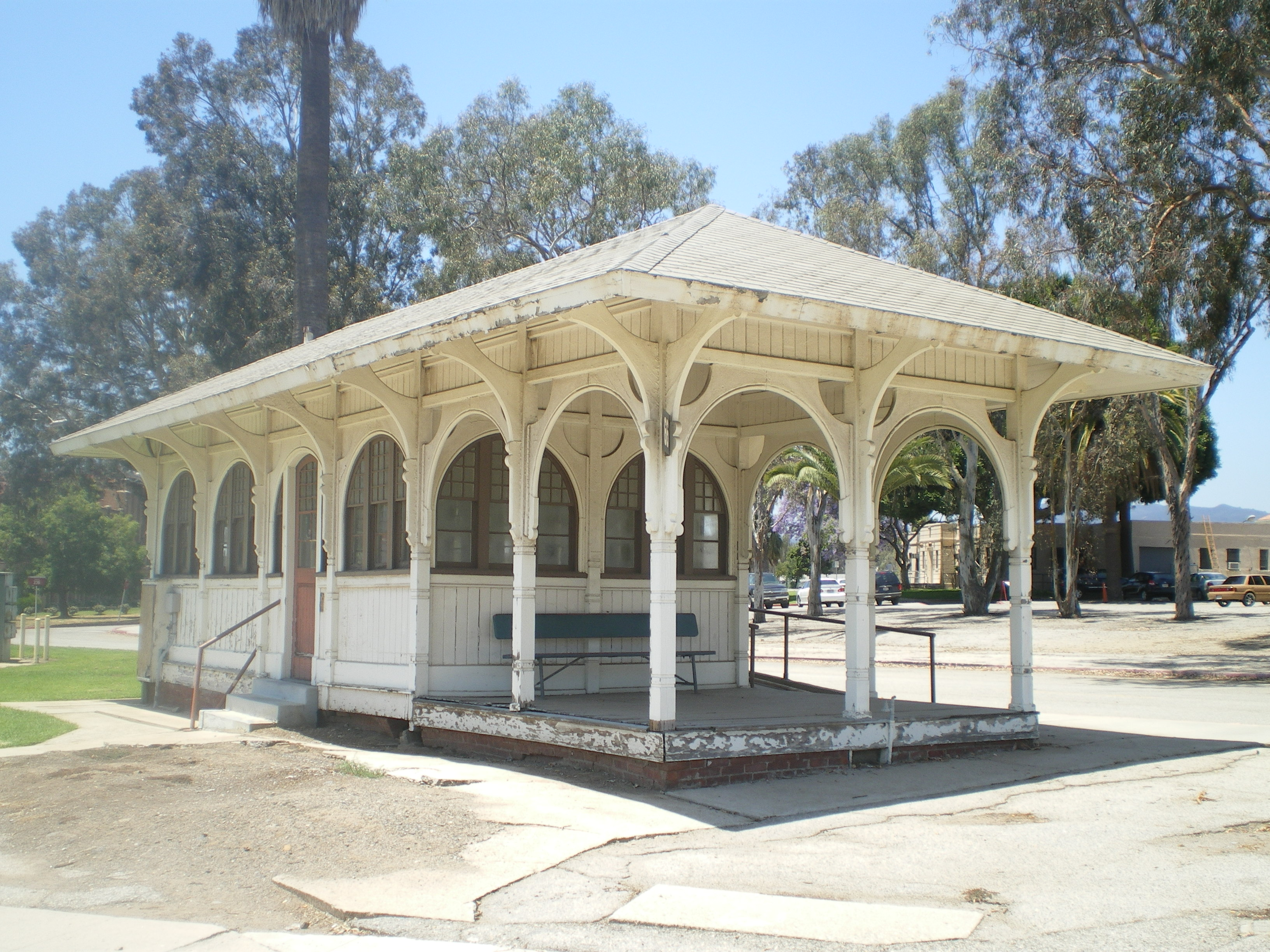
Streetcar Depot at end of the former branch line from this station, located on the Sawtelle Veterans Home grounds.

Originally "Vervain" station, it was renamed "Home Junction" when it became the junction point with the Soldier's Home Branch, a route heading north along the west side of Sepulveda Boulevard to the Streetcar Depot building on the Sawtelle Veterans Home grounds.

Much of the former right-of-way for the Home Branch can be seen, but it is no longer contiguous as various sections have been sold and developed.

== Notable places nearby ==
The station is within walking distance of the following notable places:

- Producers Guild of America
- Mori Nozomi

== Location and design ==
Located at the intersection of Sepulveda Boulevard and Exposition Boulevard in West Los Angeles, the station is a short distance from the major intersection of Sepulveda and Pico Boulevards. The station is elevated over Sepulveda Boulevard with a single center platform. A new two-story parking structure was also built to the south of the station.

The Final Environmental Impact Report (EIR) for Expo Phase 2 designated this station as at-grade However, the report also included a design option for an elevated station should the additional funds become available. The $5.3 million cost difference was ultimately allocated by the Los Angeles City Council on March 18, 2011, and the elevated option was approved by the Expo Board on the same day.

A concrete processing plant located just north of the station site, on the west side of Sepulveda between Exposition and Pico Boulevards, was purchased by Casden Properties, who plans to build a large mixed-use transit development on the site, including 538 apartments and a Target store

=== Hours and frequency ===
E Line service hours are from approximately 4:30 a.m. and 11:45 p.m daily. Trains operate every 8 minutes during peak hours, Monday to Friday. Trains run every 10 minutes, during midday on weekdays and weekends, from 9:00 a.m. to 7:00 p.m. Night and early morning service is approximately every 20 minutes every day.

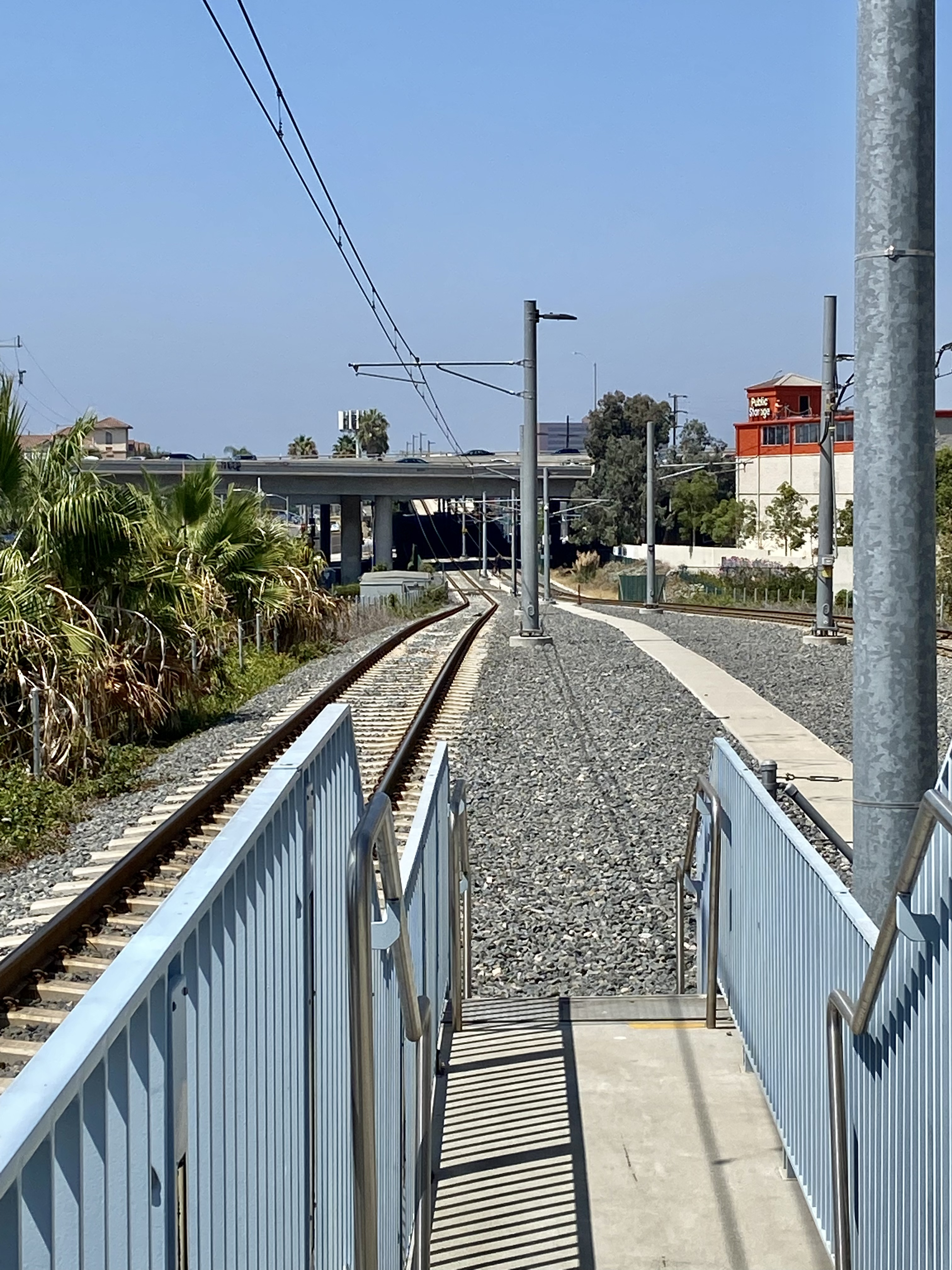
View from Expo/Sepulveda station platform, looking west to 405 freeway undercrossing

=== Connections ===
As of July 30, 2026, the following connections are available:

- Big Blue Bus (Santa Monica): 7, 17
- Culver CityBus: 6, Rapid 6
- Los Angeles Metro Bus: 233 (early AM/late night only), Rapid 761

=== Future ===
The planned Sepulveda Transit Corridor will have a Phase One southern terminus at Expo/Sepulveda station, connecting with the E Line.
