= Sepulveda Boulevard =

Street in Los Angeles, California

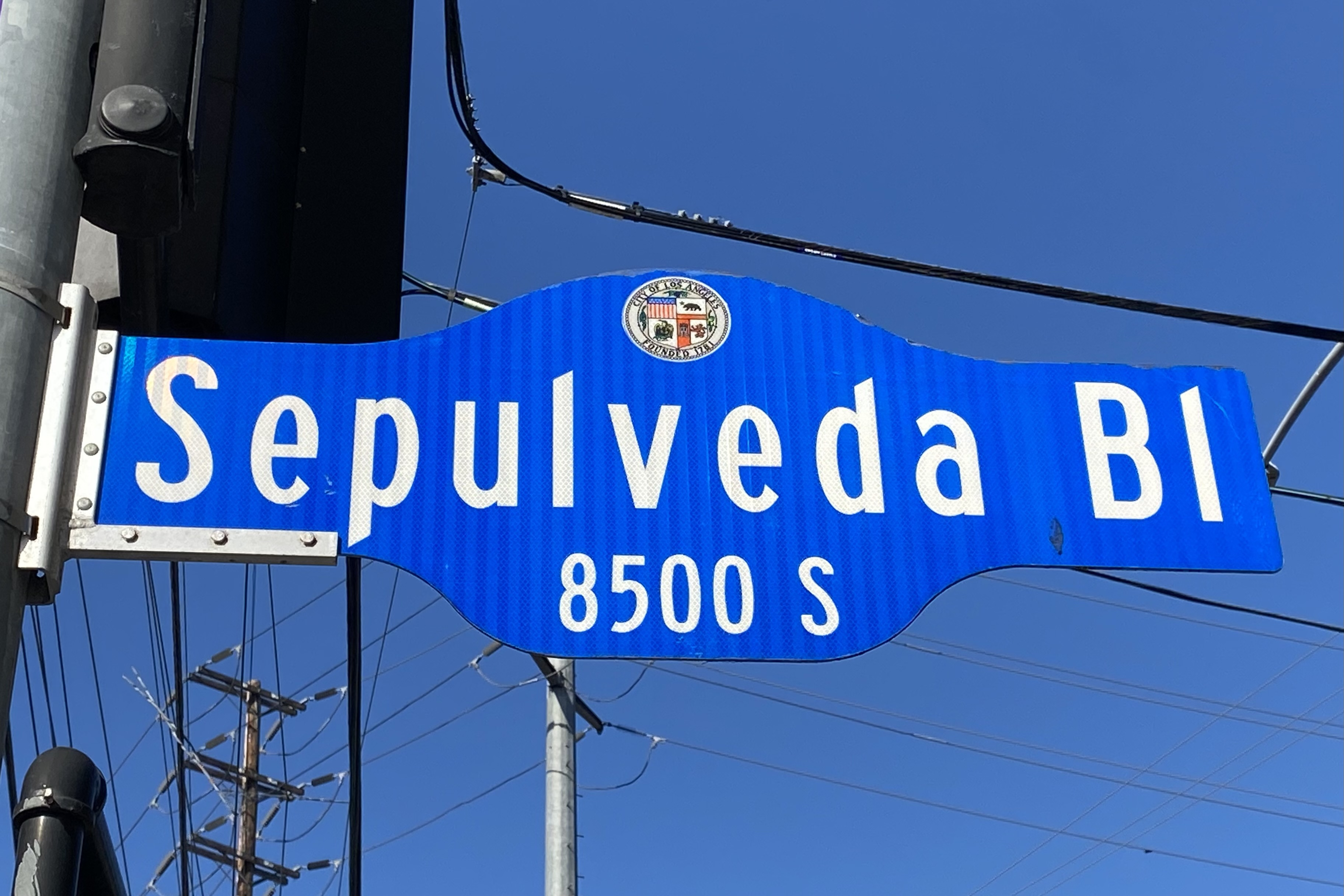
- Sepulveda Boulevard sign
- Interactive map of Sepulveda Boulevard
- Part of: SR 1 between Manhattan Beach and north of LAX Airport
- Namesake: Sepúlveda family
- Maintained by: Local city jurisdictions; Los Angeles County Department of Public Works; Caltrans
- Length: 42.8 mi (68.9 km) (in 2006)
- Location: Los Angeles County, California, United States
- Nearest metro station: : Sepulveda; Expo/Sepulveda; Willow St
- South end: Willow Street in Long Beach
- Major junctions: I-110 at the West Carson–Carson line; SR 107 in Torrance; Camino Real in Torrance; SR 1 in Manhattan Beach; I-105 near LAX; SR 1 near LAX; US 101 in Sherman Oaks; SR 118 in Mission Hills; I-405 in Mission Hills; Roxford Street in Sylmar
- North end: San Fernando Road in Sylmar

Sepulveda Boulevard is a major street and transportation corridor in the City of Los Angeles and several other cities in western Los Angeles County, California. The street parallels Interstate 405 for much of its route. Portions of Sepulveda Boulevard between Manhattan Beach and Los Angeles International Airport (LAX) are designated as part of State Route 1 (SR 1).

Since 2018, there have been four distinct segments in Los Angeles County signed as Sepulveda Boulevard, after the City of El Segundo officially renamed their portion Pacific Coast Highway, the named designation of SR 1. The southernmost of the four segments is an east-west route located in the South Bay, and continues west as Camino Real in Torrance and east as Willow Street in Long Beach. The second segment runs from Manhattan Beach north to the southern border of El Segundo. After running through SR 1 as Pacific Coast Highway, the third segment of Sepulveda Boulevard runs from LAX, through the Westside regions, and over the Santa Monica Mountains at the Sepulveda Pass into the San Fernando Valley. The northernmost section of Sepulveda Boulevard is in Sylmar, running from Roxford Street north to San Fernando Road.

Sepulveda Boulevard was formerly the longest street in the city and county of Los Angeles, with the Los Angeles Times reporting in 2006 that it was around 42.8 miles (68.9 km) in length.

== History ==
In 1769, the Spanish Portola expedition, the first Europeans to see inland areas of California, traveled north through Sepulveda pass on August 5. The party had been travelling west, intending to reach and follow the coast, but were discouraged by the steep coastal cliffs beginning at today's Pacific Palisades and decided to detour inland. They found the pass through the Santa Monica Mountains and followed it into the San Fernando Valley. The pass had originally been a faint footpath used by the native Tongva people.

Sepulveda Boulevard was named in 1925 after 18th century cattle rancher Francisco Xavier de Sepúlveda, whose ranch, Rancho San Vicente y Santa Monica, extended from the route to the Pacific Ocean.

Between the City of Hermosa Beach and Lincoln Boulevard, the road was once signed as U.S. Route 101 Alternate until being replaced by State Route 1, and between Lincoln Boulevard and San Fernando Road (formerly US 99), the road was once signed as State Route 7 until being replaced by Interstate 405.

The part of the route that runs through the San Fernando Valley was a major hub of prostitution. The entertainment industry has also referenced the street. The 1931 comedy film Everything's Rosie has a chase scene that goes through the newly built Sepulveda Boulevard tunnel. In 1946, the Jay Livingston and Ray Evans composing duo wrote the song Sepulveda in tribute to the street; the song would be recorded by Alvino Rey and his Orchestra with Joanne Ryan for Capitol Records, as would The King's Jesters for Vogue Records. Sepulveda Boulevard, along with Pico Boulevard, is mentioned in the title and lyrics of a novelty song Pico and Sepulveda composed by Eddie Maxwell (Eddie Cherkose) and Jule Styne; this song was recorded by Freddy Martin and his Orchestra in 1947 for release as a single.

=== Name changes ===
Portions of Sepulveda Boulevard have had the name changed, especially most of those segments that were designated by state officials as part of State Route 1. Hermosa Beach historian John Hales said that the city formally adopted the name of Pacific Coast Highway in 1947 to possibly end a dispute to whether to name the route Sepulveda or Camino Real. In 2018, the city of El Segundo also decided to formally change the name to Pacific Coast Highway to better appeal to visitors as being a coastal community.

== Route description ==
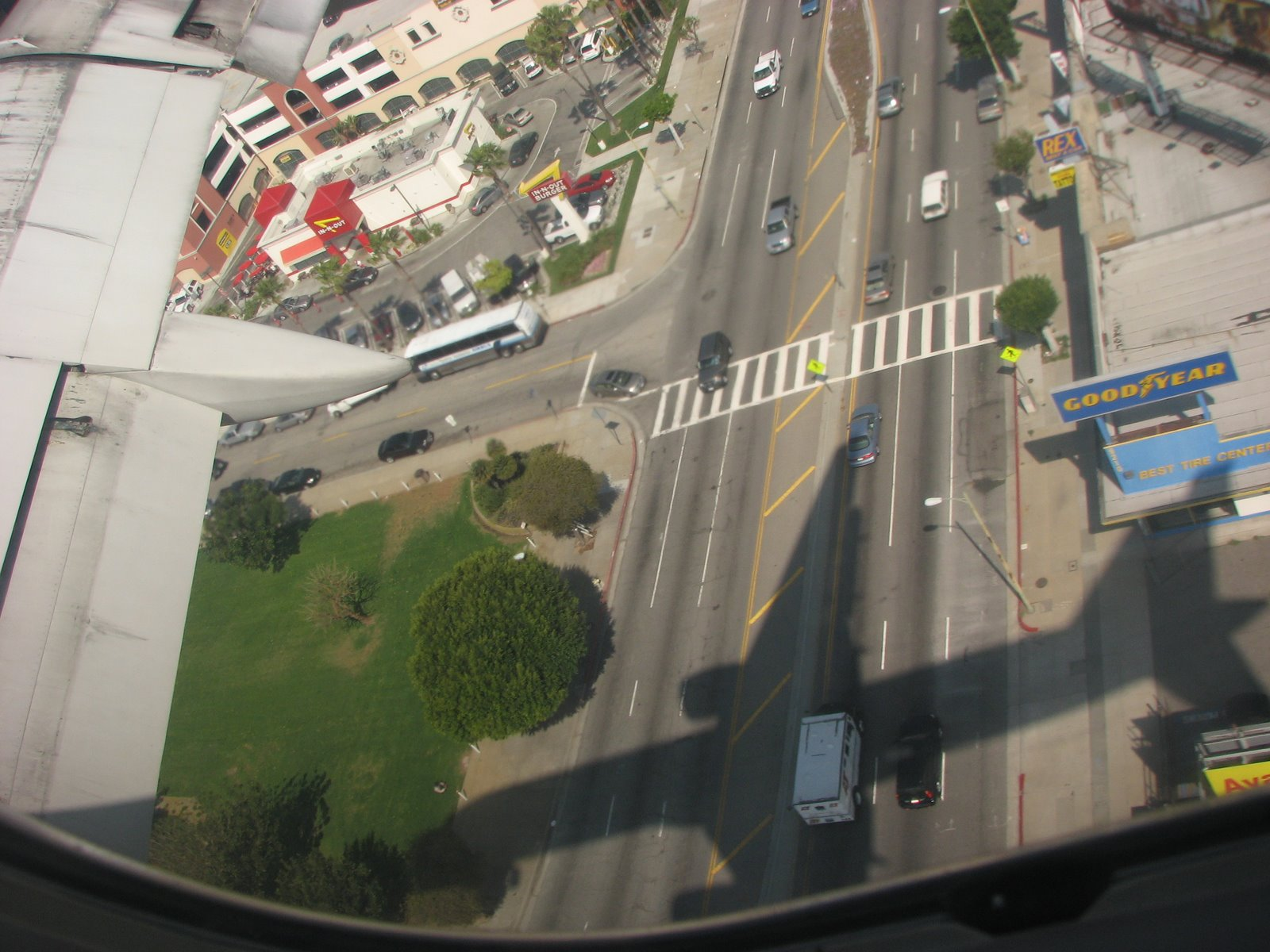
Sepulveda Boulevard from a Boeing 757 on approach to LAX

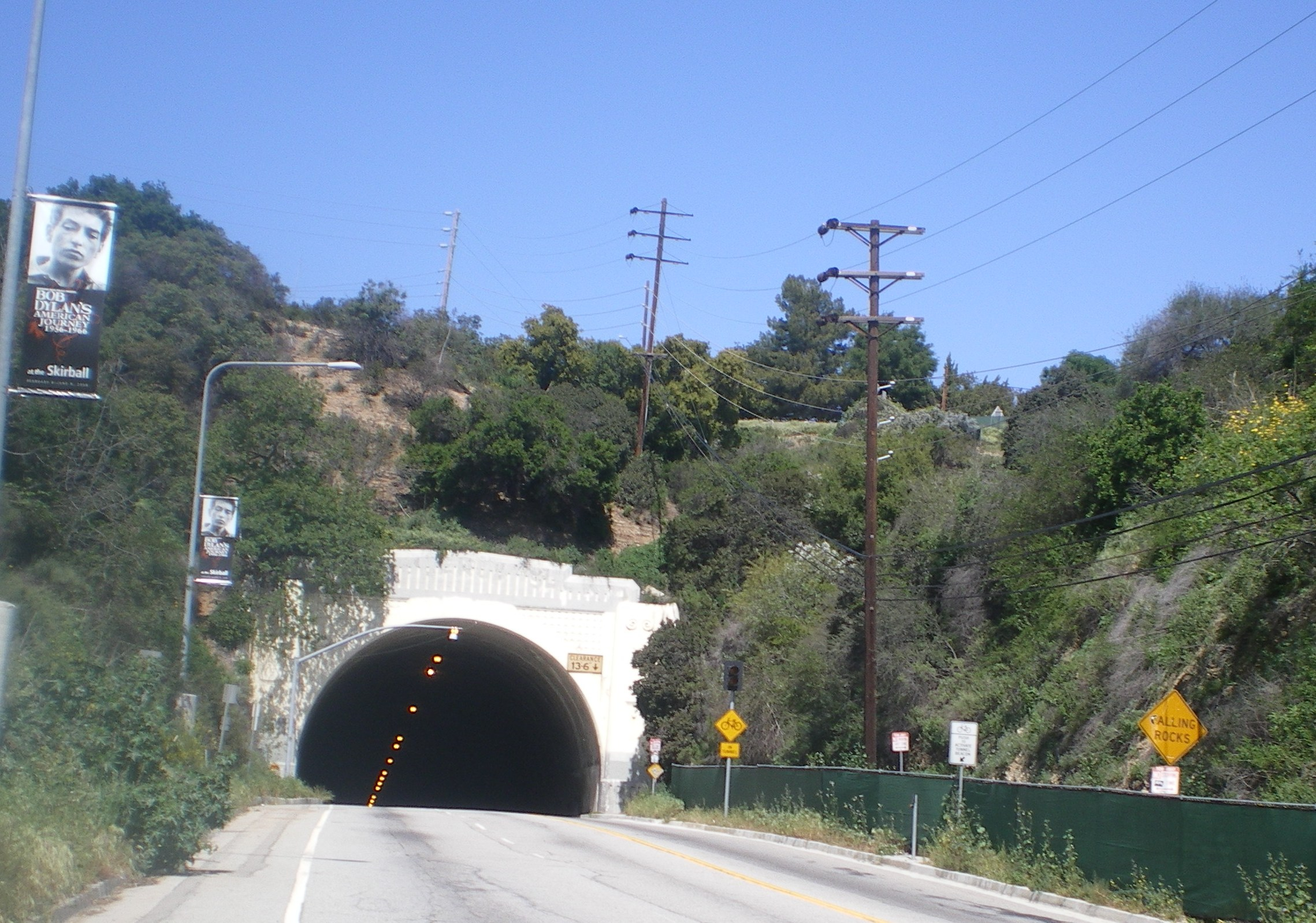
Sepulveda Boulevard Tunnel, Opened in 1930

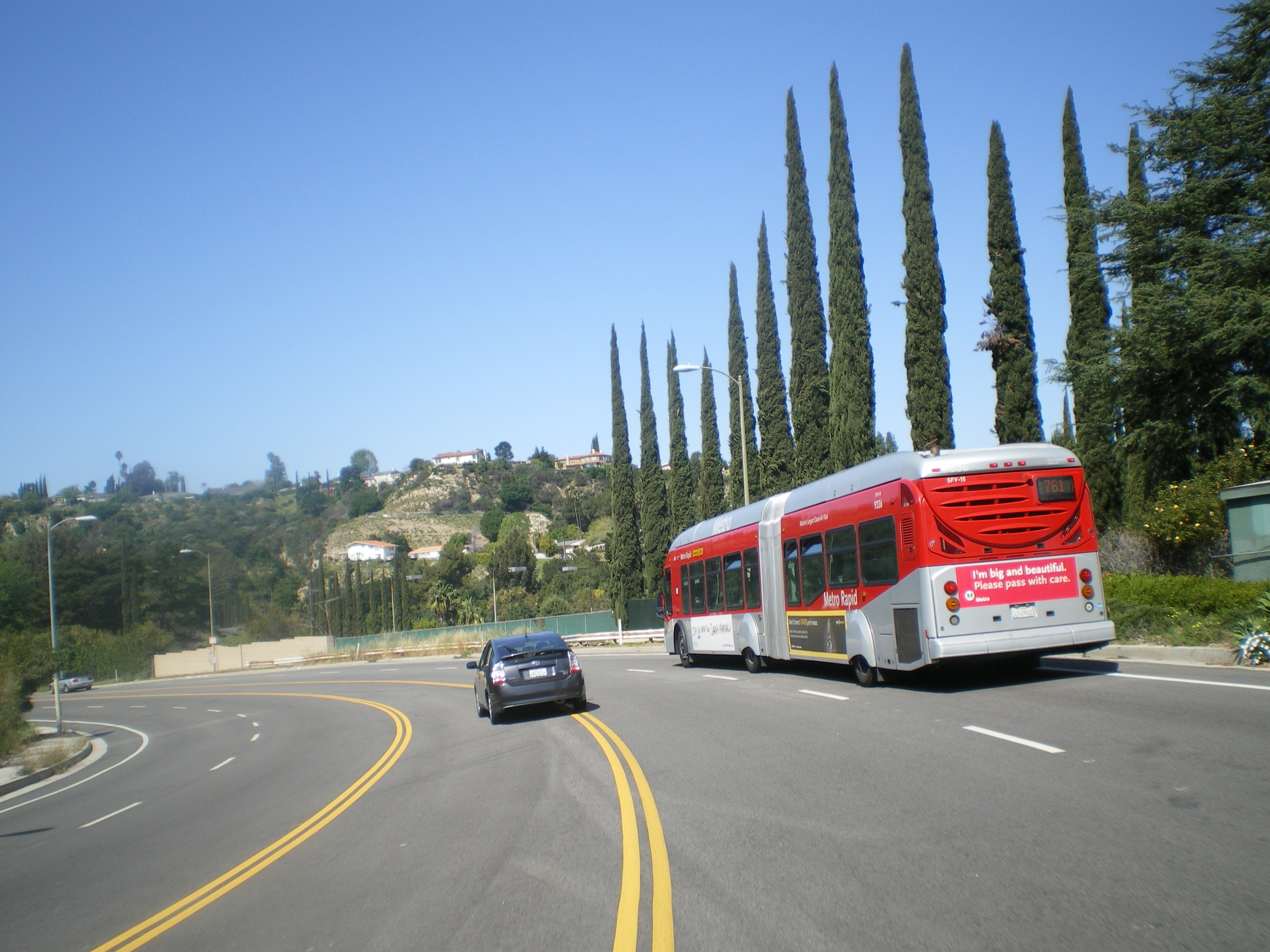
Sepulveda Boulevard, Sepulveda Pass

Since 2018, there are four distinct segments in Los Angeles County signed as Sepulveda Boulevard. All four once connected to each other. The three north-south segments were once a continuous route but were separated by local renaming and freeway construction. There is no current evidence that the southernmost east-west route was once continuous with the north-south segments.

The southernmost segment is an east-west route located in the South Bay area that continues east as Willow Street near SR 103 in Long Beach, and west as Camino Real before Torrance Boulevard in Torrance. It crosses the Harbor Freeway (I-110) in West Carson.

Sepulveda Boulevard then resumes at Artesia Boulevard in Manhattan Beach as a continuation of SR 1. In 2018, the city of El Segundo renamed their portion of SR 1 to Pacific Coast Highway from Rosecrans Avenue to Imperial Highway where SR 1 continues again as Sepulveda Boulevard. Past Imperial Highway, it crosses the western terminus of the Century Freeway (I-105), going through the LAX Airport Tunnel to pass under its runways. The road then passes through an interchange with Century Boulevard, which provides access to LAX's terminals to the west and the San Diego Freeway (I-405) to the east.

At the north end of LAX, SR 1 branches to the west as Lincoln Boulevard while Sepulveda Boulevard continues north to become a primary thoroughfare through the Westside region cities and communities of Westchester, Culver City, West Los Angeles, and Westwood. In Culver City, north of Slauson Avenue, it merges for a few blocks with Jefferson Boulevard. From Jefferson, Sepulveda Boulevard runs parallel to I-405 as it goes through West Los Angeles and Westwood, passing the Los Angeles National Cemetery.

After going past Bel Air, it parallels the freeway up the Sepulveda Canyon. At the Skirball Cultural Center, Sepulveda Boulevard then curves west away from I-405, passes through a tunnel under Mulholland Drive, and then follows a serpentine route down the north side of the Sepulveda Pass. It then passes under I-405 just before crossing Ventura Boulevard in Sherman Oaks. Sepulveda Boulevard then runs parallel to the east of I-405, crossing the Ventura Freeway (US 101) and the Los Angeles Metro G Line rapid transit route, and through the San Fernando Valley communities of Van Nuys and North Hills, to its northern terminus at the Rinaldi Street interchange with I-405 in Mission Hills.

The northernmost section of Sepulveda Boulevard in Sylmar, running from Roxford Street to San Fernando Road, is primarily a frontage road along the Golden State Freeway (I-5). Prior to the construction of the 405 freeway in the 1960s, that disjunct piece and the main section of Sepulveda Boulevard were one continuous street, separated when the 405 freeway interchange with the Golden State Freeway was built atop the section between Rinaldi and Roxford Streets and referred to as the "boulevard of death" due to having over 30 deaths in 11 years at this now demolished segment.

== Public transportation ==
Public transit along Sepulveda Boulevard is provided by several bus lines. The north-south part provides bus service in the San Fernando Valley by Metro Local line 234, through the Sepulveda Pass by Metro Rapid line 761, through West Los Angeles, Culver City and LAX by Culver City Transit Line 6 and Rapid 6, and from LAX onwards by Metro Local line 232. The west-east portion of Sepulveda Boulevard provides bus service by Torrance Transit line 7. Metro Rail has a station at Exposition Blvd on the E Line while Metro Busway has a station of the same name on the G Line. The A Line has a station in Long Beach at Long Beach Blvd within Willow Street, which is a section of the same road as Sepulveda after its terminus. A large portion of the boulevard is set to be served by the Sepulveda Transit Corridor which will include the Sepulveda Pass.

== Major intersections ==
The entire route is in Los Angeles County.

Location	mi	km	Destinations	Notes
Long Beach			Willow Street	Southeast end of South Bay segment of Sepulveda Boulevard
Carson			SR 47 (Alameda Street)	
Carson			Main Street	
Carson			Figueroa Street	
West Carson			I-110 (Harbor Freeway)	
Torrance			Normandie Avenue	
Torrance			Western Avenue	
Torrance			Crenshaw Boulevard	
Torrance			SR 107 (Hawthorne Boulevard)	
Torrance			Camino Real	Northwest end of South Bay segment of Sepulveda Boulevard
Gap in route
Hermosa Beach–Manhattan Beach line			SR 1 south (Pacific Coast Highway) Artesia Boulevard to SR 91 east	South end of second segment of Sepulveda Boulevard; south end of SR 1 overlap; former official western end of SR 91
Manhattan Beach–El Segundo line			Pacific Coast Highway (SR 1 north) / Rosecrans Avenue	North end of second segment of Sepulveda Boulevard; north end of SR 1 overlap
Gap in route
El Segundo–Los Angeles line			Pacific Coast Highway (SR 1 south) / Imperial Highway	South end of third segment of Sepulveda Boulevard; south end of SR 1 overlap
Los Angeles			I-105	
Los Angeles			Century Boulevard	
Los Angeles			SR 1 north (Lincoln Boulevard)	North end of SR 1 overlap
Los Angeles			Manchester Boulevard	Former SR 42
Culver City			SR 90 (Marina Freeway)	
Culver City			Washington Boulevard	
Los Angeles			Venice Boulevard (SR 187)	
Los Angeles			SR 2 (Santa Monica Boulevard)	
Los Angeles			Wilshire Boulevard	
Los Angeles			Sunset Boulevard	
Los Angeles			Ventura Boulevard	Former Bus. US 101
Los Angeles			US 101 (Ventura Freeway)	
Los Angeles			SR 118 (Simi Valley Freeway)	
San Fernando			I-405 (San Diego Freeway) to I-5 north (Golden State Freeway) / Rinaldi Street	North end of third segment
Gap in route
Los Angeles			Roxford Street	
Los Angeles			San Fernando Road	North end of Sepulveda Boulevard
1.000 mi = 1.609 km; 1.000 km = 0.621 mi: Concurrency terminus
