= HHLA (mall) =

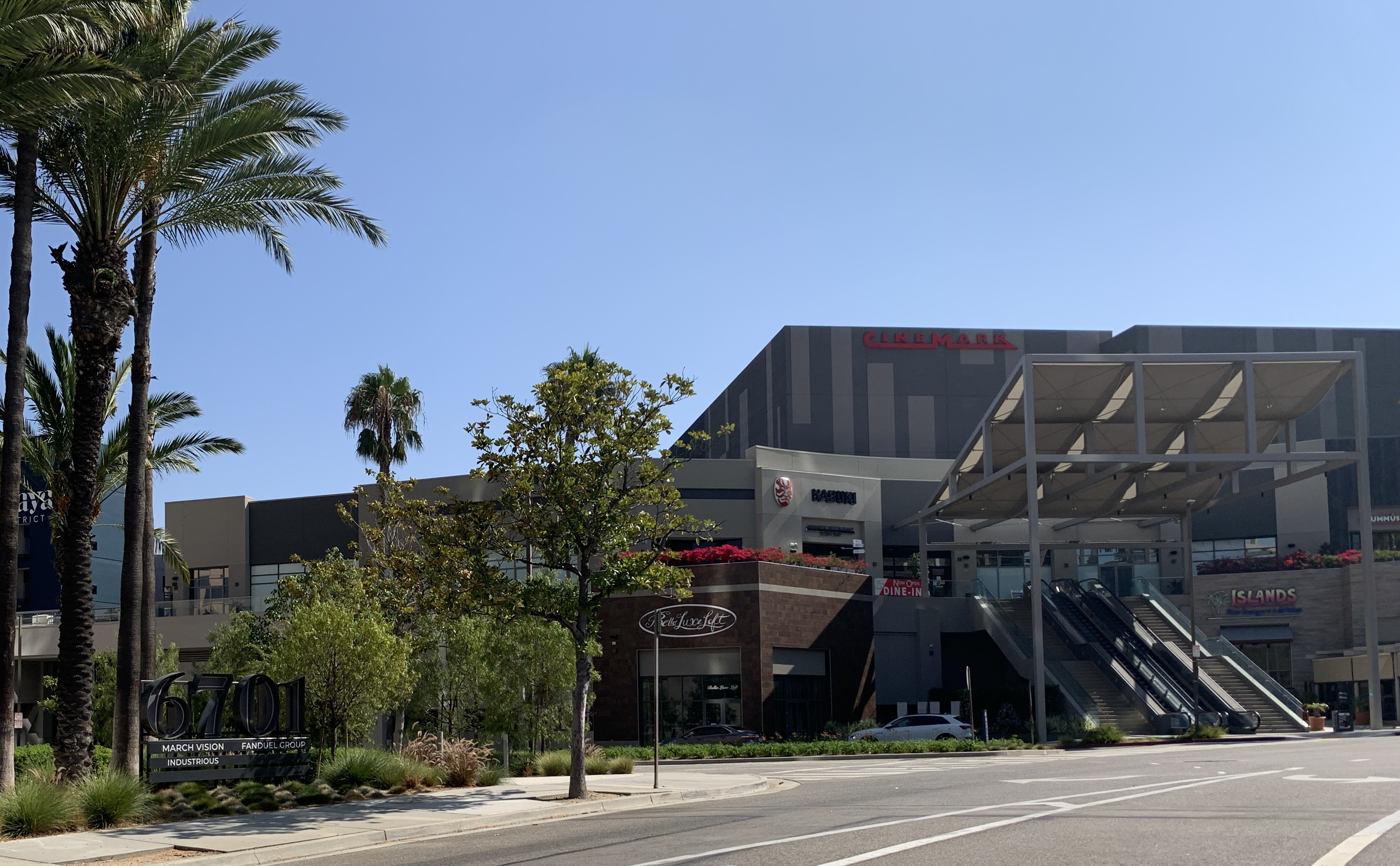
- Location: Los Angeles, California
- Coordinates: 33.9784°N 118.3922°W
- Address: 6081 Center Drive Los Angeles, CA 90045
- Opened: December 3, 2000; 25 years ago
- Owner: Invesco and Simon Property Group (50%)
- Architect: Daniel Libeskind
- Num. of stores: 156
- Num. of anchor tenants: 6
- Floor area: 1,262,354 sq ft (117,276.5 m^{2})
- Floors: 2
- Parking: 6,000
- Website: hhpromenade.com

HHLA (formerly The Promenade at Howard Hughes Center) is a two-level outdoor mixed-use center that features a blend of entertainment, dining, and shopping venues located at the Howard Hughes Center in Westchester and adjacent to Playa Vista in the city of Los Angeles, California. It is also close to the Fox Hills district in Culver City.

The mall is located on Sepulveda Boulevard beside the San Diego Freeway (Interstate 405), one of the major freeways in Los Angeles with over 297,000 motorists passing daily.

== History ==
The Promenade at Howard Hughes Center was developed by jH Snyder Company, and opened in 2000. It originally featured The Bridge Cinema De Lux, a luxury movie theater with IMAX screens, several restaurants including Islands, Johnny Rockets, Ben & Jerry's, On The Border, Subway and Starbucks, plus a Nordstrom Rack, and Borders. The movie theater was eventually purchased by Rave Cinemas and operated under the Rave banner until the theater was one of the 32 locations that was purchased by Cinemark in 2012, but the theater still retained Rave logo until 2015 when it was renovated to be one of Cinemark's flagship theaters, featuring 18 screens, some featuring Cinemark XD and D-Box seats. The center was popular around its opening but over the years lost popularity due to its proximity to Westfield Culver City, and it lost some of its big tenants including Borders which closed in 2011 due to the chain's liquidation, and Nordstrom Rack which relocated to Westfield Culver City in 2013. On The Border closed and was replaced by Souplantation until it closed in 2017. It did however, manage to attract new tenants to fill some of the vacant space including Buffalo Wild Wings, Dave & Busters, and Kabuki Japanese Restaurant. The Laurus Corp. acquired the Howard Hughes Center, including The Promenade, in 2015. Laurus announced plans for a large-scale residential expansion, remodeling, and overhaul designed by the Jerde Partnership.

The center is part of the 70-acre (280,000 m^{2}) Howard Hughes Center business campus, that includes buildings for mixed use office, retail, and health care tenants. Neighbors include a Pepperdine University satellite campus, and headquarter corporations such as Universal Studios, Univision, and Sony.

The mall was renamed HHLA in 2023.

== See also ==
- Shopping malls in Los Angeles
- Westfield Culver City
