= Culver City, California =

City in California, United States

- City
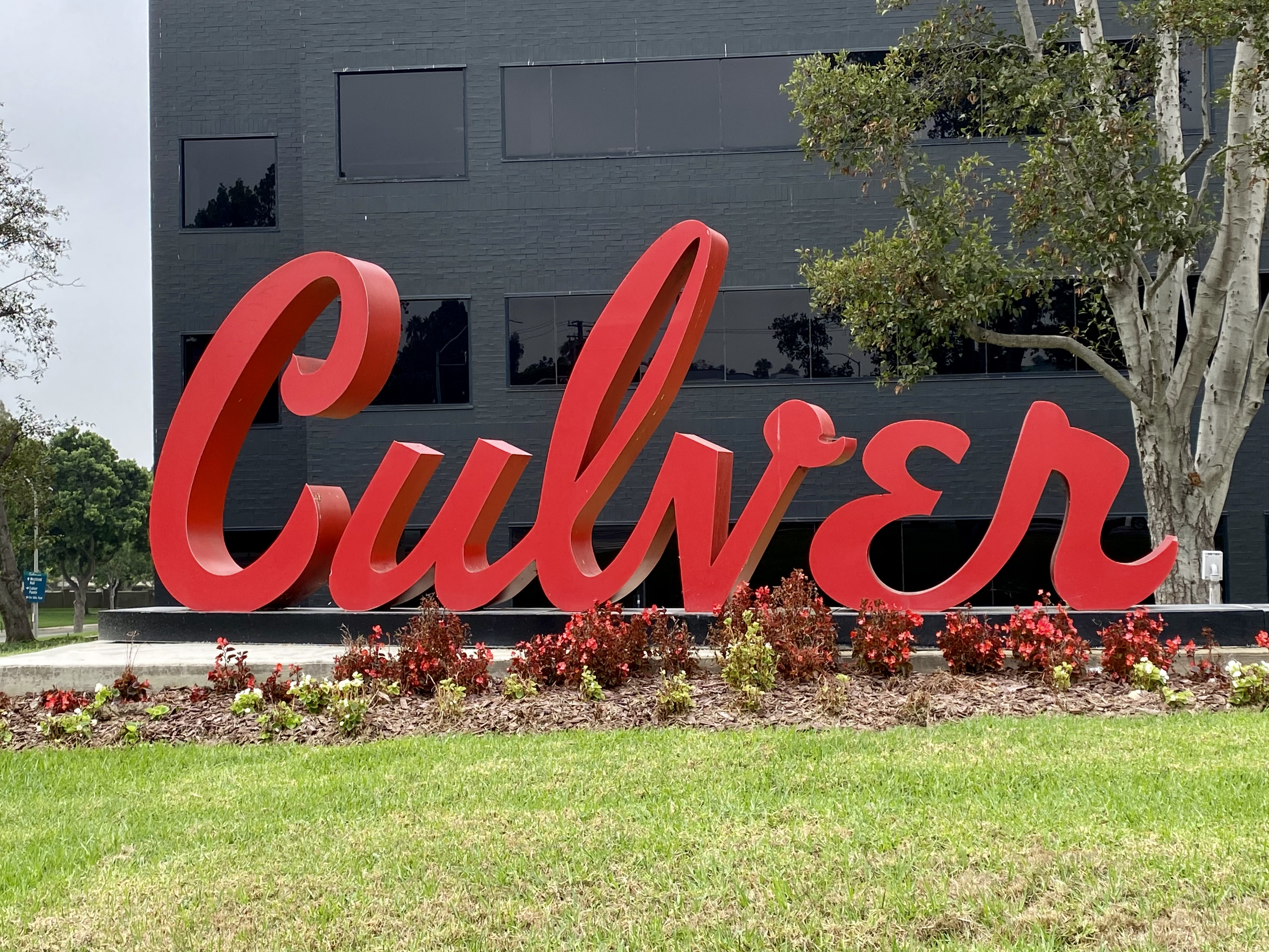
- Culver City sign based on the marquee of the Culver Theatre (now Kirk Douglas Theatre)

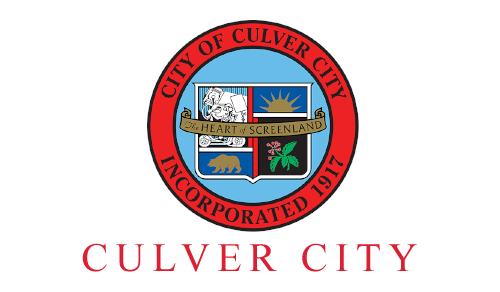
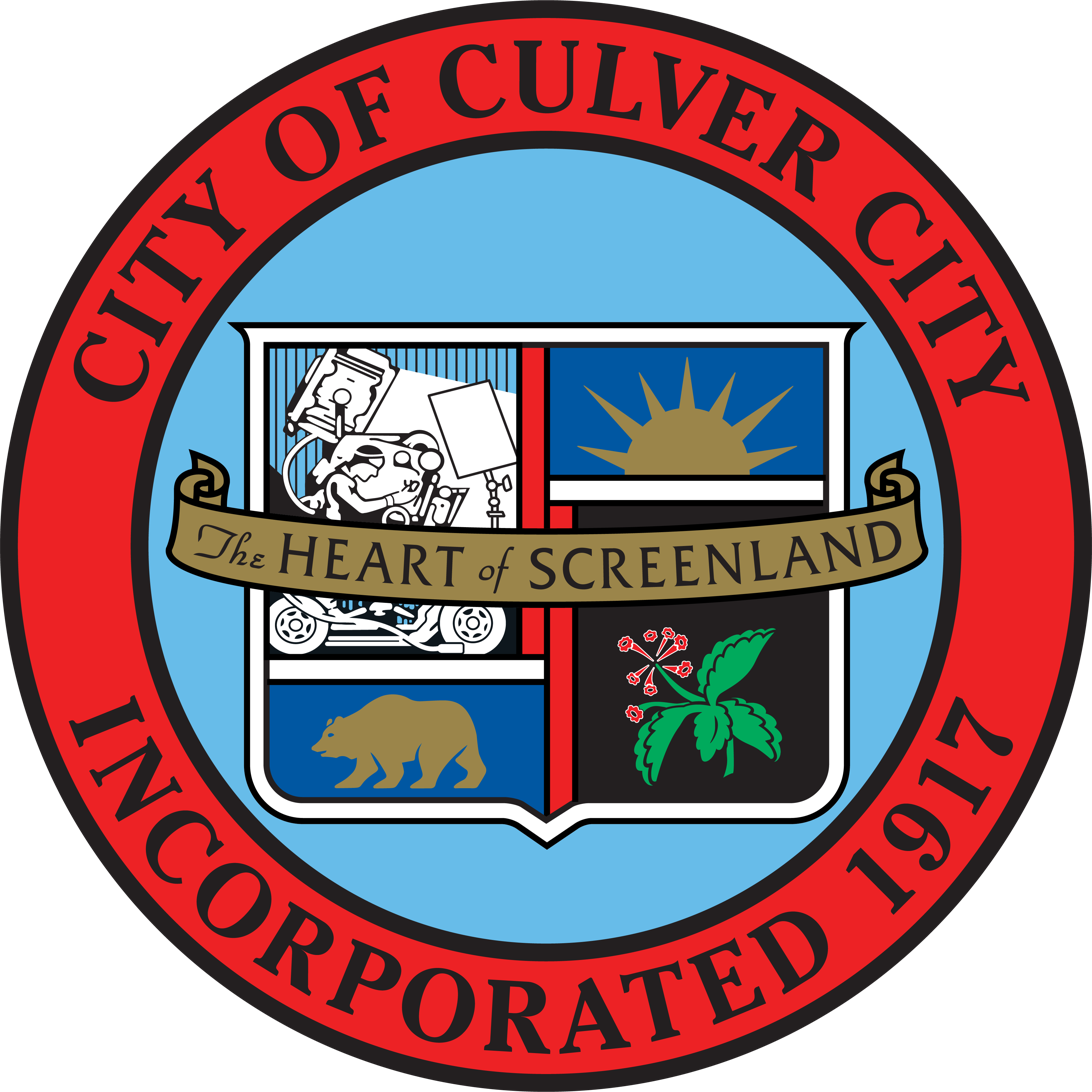
- Flag Seal
- Motto: "The Heart of Screenland"
- Interactive map of Culver City, California
- Coordinates: 34°0′28″N 118°24′3″W
- Country: United States
- State: California
- County: Los Angeles
- Incorporated: September 20, 1917
- Named for: Harry Culver

Government
  - Type: Council-Manager
  - Mayor: Freddy Puza
  - Vice Mayor: Bryan "Bubba" Fish
  - City Council: Yasmine-Imani McMorrin; Dan O'Brien; Albert Vera
  - City Manager: Odis Jones

Area
  - Total: 5.14 sq mi (13.31 km^{2})
  - Land: 5.11 sq mi (13.24 km^{2})
  - Water: 0.027 sq mi (0.07 km^{2}) 0.54%
- Elevation: 95 ft (29 m)

Population (2020)
  - Total: 40,779
  - Density: 7,977.6/sq mi (3,080.15/km^{2})
- Time zone: UTC−8 (Pacific Time Zone)
  - Summer (DST): UTC−7 (PDT)
- ZIP Codes: 90230–90232, 90066
- Area codes: 310/424
- FIPS code: 06-17568
- GNIS feature IDs: 1652695, 2410276
- Website: culvercity.gov

Culver City is a city in Los Angeles County, California, United States. As of the 2020 census, the population was 40,779. It is mostly surrounded by Los Angeles, but also shares a border with the unincorporated area of Ladera Heights to the east. The city was named after Harry Culver who incorporated it in 1917.

In the 1920s, Culver City became a center for film and later television production. It was best known as the home of Metro-Goldwyn-Mayer studios from 1924 to 1986. From 1932 to 1986, it was the headquarters for the Hughes Aircraft Company. National Public Radio West and Sony Pictures Entertainment have headquarters in the city. It has been described as a "largely idyllic...peaceful, semi-suburban community with a relatively low crime rate and high quality of life" best known for its "parks, studio lots, and breakfast burritos".

== History ==
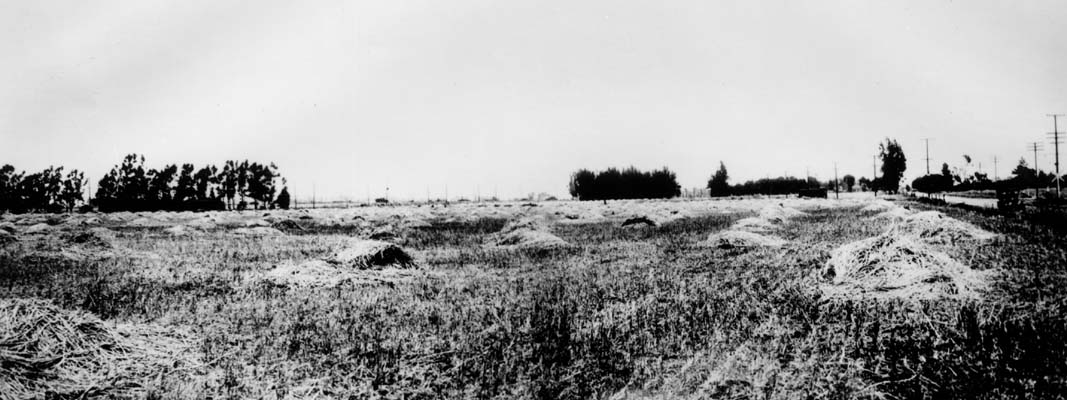
The site of Culver City, 1913

=== Early history ===
Archaeological evidence suggests a human presence in the area of present-day Culver City since at least 8000 BCE. The region was the homeland of the Tongva-Gabrieliño Native Americans. For centuries, native people lived in areas currently part of and surrounding Culver City. The Spanish and Mexican governments offered concessions and land grants from 1785 to 1846 forming the Ranchos of California. Culver City was founded on the lands of the former Rancho La Ballona and Rancho Rincon de los Bueyes.

During the American Civil War, a U.S. Army post called Camp Latham was established from 1861 to 1862 on the south bank of Ballona Creek.

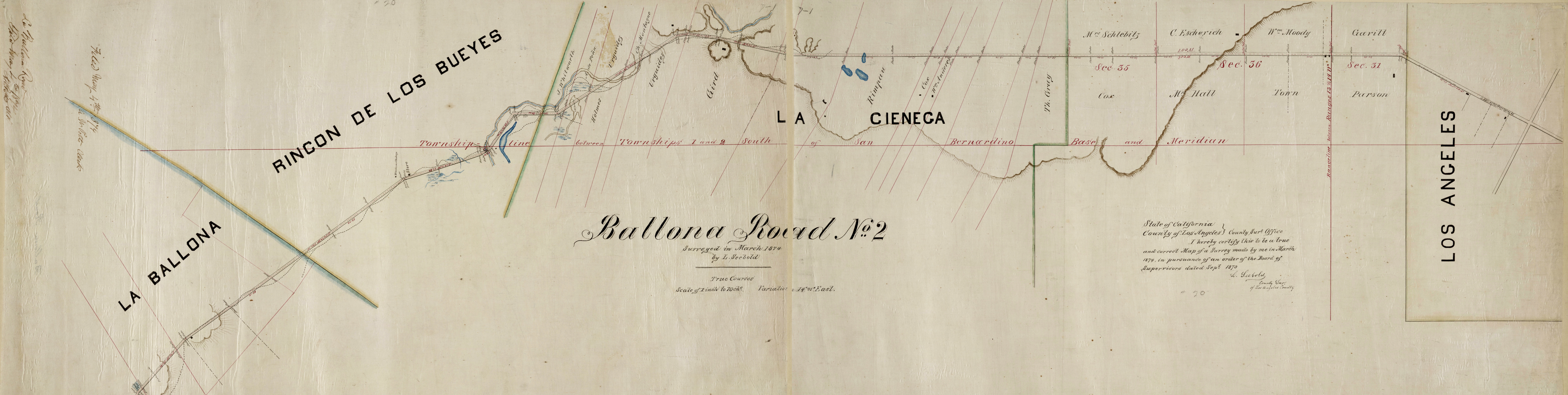
Ballona Road - 1874 - present-day Washington Boulevard surveyed from roughly Elenda Street (the "school lot" is La Ballona Elementary) to Hoover Street

=== Culver City ===
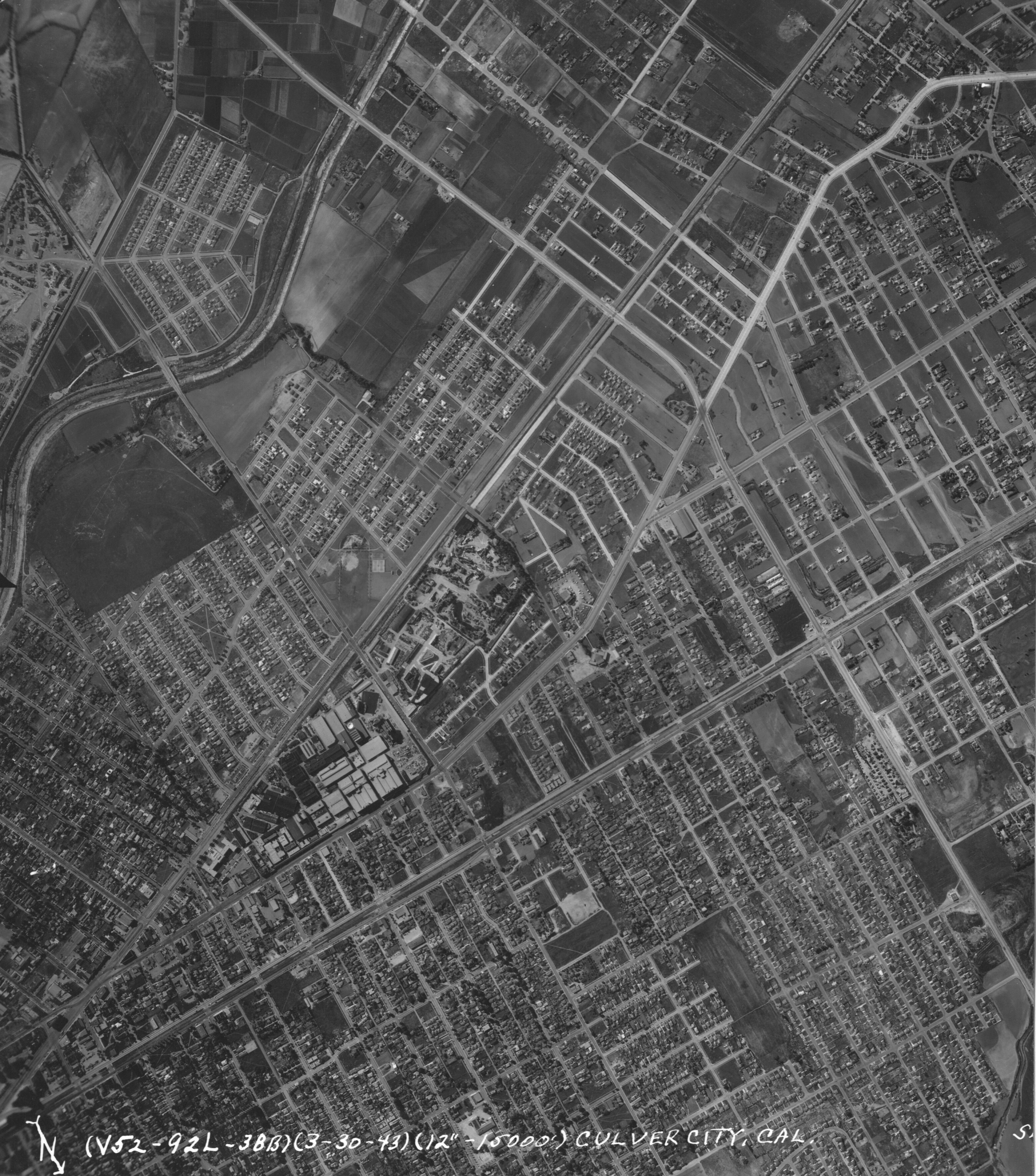
Culver City in 1943

Harry Culver first attempted to establish Culver City in 1913. It was officially incorporated on September 20, 1917, and named after its founder. The area benefited from pre-existing transportation links; Culver's first ads read "All roads lead to Culver City". The city was explicitly founded as a whites-only sundown town, as were most of the suburbs and towns outside the downtown and Central Avenue districts of Los Angeles. Culver ran ads promoting "this model little white city", while his close associate, Guy M. Rush, promoted lot sales "restricted to Caucasian race". The city also at times excluded people of non-Christian religious faiths.

The weekly Culver City Call was the first newspaper in the community. The paper was founded in 1915.

The first film studio in Culver City was built by Thomas Ince in 1918 for The Triangle Motion Picture Company. Silent film comedy producer Hal Roach built his studios there in 1919, and Metro Goldwyn Mayer (MGM) took over the Triangle studio complex in 1924. During Prohibition, speakeasies and nightclubs such as the Cotton Club lined Washington Boulevard.

Culver Center, one of Southern California's first shopping malls, was completed in 1950 on Venice Boulevard near the Overland Avenue intersection.

The Downtown Culver City Business Association has promoted the city's Main Street as the "Shortest Main Street in the USA", although the street measures approximately 200 feet (61 m) in length. This distinction is disputed by Cramerton, North Carolina, where Main Street is documented as approximately 100 feet (30 m) long.

=== Hughes Aircraft Company ===
Hughes Aircraft opened its Culver City plant in July 1941. There the company built the H-4 Hercules transport (commonly called the "Spruce Goose"). Hughes was also an active subcontractor during World War II. It developed and patented a flexible feed chute for faster loading of machine guns on B-17 bombers, and manufactured electric booster drives for machine guns. Hughes produced more ammunition belts than any other American manufacturer, and built 5,576 wings and 6,370 rear fuselage sections for Vultee BT-13 trainers.

Hughes grew after the war, and in 1953 Howard Hughes donated all his stock in the company to the Howard Hughes Medical Institute. After he died in 1976, the institute sold the company, which made it the second-best-endowed medical research foundation in the world.

=== The studios (1960s, 1970s and 1980s) ===
Bicycles parked in front of the Culver Theater in Culver City for a 1977 showing of King Kong

The Hal Roach Studios were demolished in 1963. In the late 1960s, much of the MGM backlot acreage (lot 3 and other property on Jefferson Boulevard), and the nearby 28.5 acres (11.5 ha) known as RKO Forty Acres, once owned by RKO Pictures and later Desilu Productions, were sold by their owners. In 1976 the sets were razed to make way for redevelopment. Today, the RKO site is the southern expansion of the Hayden Industrial Tract, while the MGM property has been converted into a subdivision and a shopping center known as Raintree Plaza.

In October 1975, Fox Hills Mall opened in the place of a golf course.

=== Rebirth of downtown (1990s and 2000s) ===
In the early 1990s, Culver City launched a successful revitalization program in which it renovated its downtown as well as several shopping centers in the Sepulveda Boulevard corridor near Westfield Culver City. Around the same time, Sony's motion picture subsidiaries, Columbia Pictures and TriStar Pictures, moved into the former Metro-Goldwyn-Mayer lot which was renamed Columbia Studios in 1990 and took on its current name, Sony Pictures Studios, a year later.

There was an influx of art galleries and restaurants on the eastern part of the city, which was formally designated the Culver City Art District. Further development of The Culver Steps – a mixed-use plaza and downtown center – continued with the opening of an Erewhon location in spring 2023.

== Geography ==
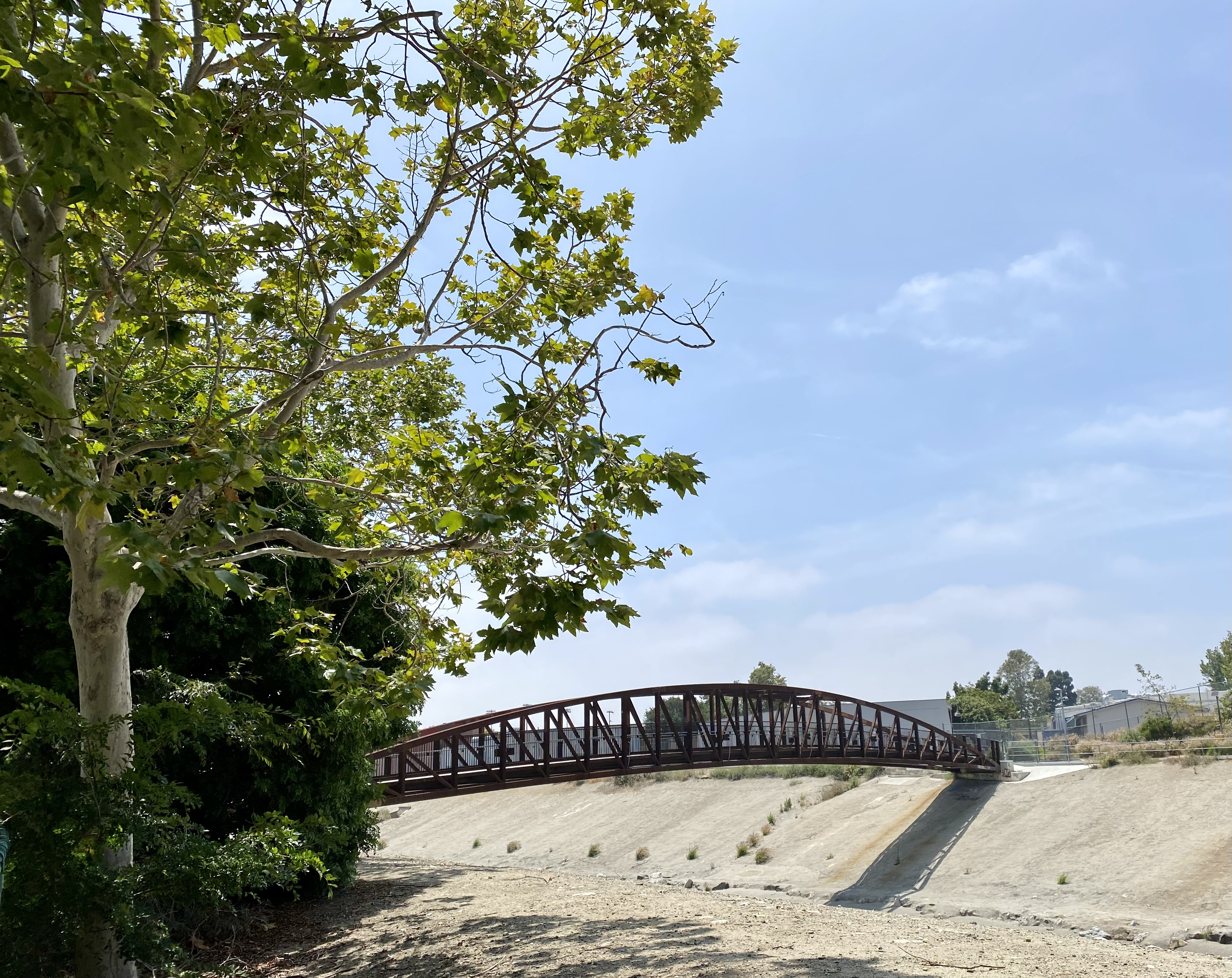
Pedestrian bridge over Ballona Creek

The city is surrounded by the Los Angeles neighborhoods of Mar Vista and Palms to the north; Westchester to the south; Mid-City, West Adams, and Baldwin Hills to the east; the Ladera Heights unincorporated area to the southeast; and the L.A. neighborhoods of Venice, Playa Vista, and Del Rey to the west, along with the unincorporated area of Marina del Rey.

Culver City's major geographic feature is Ballona Creek, which runs northeast to southwest through most of the city before it drains into Santa Monica Bay in Marina Del Rey.

According to the United States Census Bureau, the city has a total area of 5.1 square miles (13.2 km^{2}), over 99% of which is land. Over the years, it has annexed more than 40 pieces of adjoining land.

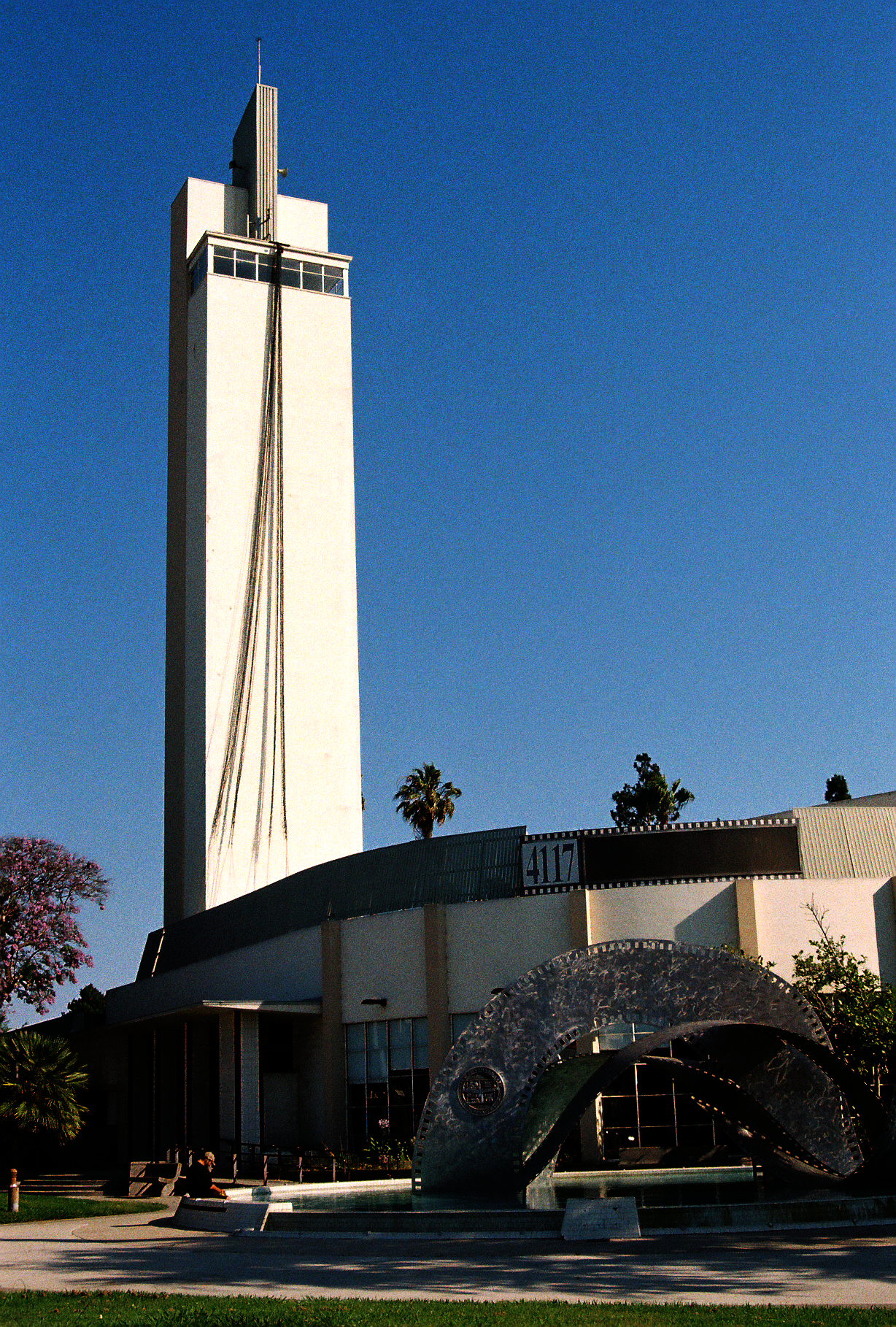
The Veterans Memorial Building located in the Park West neighborhood

=== Neighborhoods ===
The city recognizes 15 neighborhoods within city limits:

- Blair Hills
- Blanco-Culver Crest
- Clarkdale
- Culver West
- Downtown Culver City
- Fox Hills
- Jefferson
- Lucerne-Higuera
- McLaughlin
- McManus
- Park East (also known as Carlson Park)
- Park West (also known as Veterans Park)
- Studio Village
- Sunkist Park
- Washington Culver

=== Climate ===
Climate data for Culver City, California, 1991–2020 normals, extremes 1935–present
Month	Jan	Feb	Mar	Apr	May	Jun	Jul	Aug	Sep	Oct	Nov	Dec	Year
Record high °F (°C)	90 (32)	92 (33)	92 (33)	105 (41)	100 (38)	98 (37)	102 (39)	103 (39)	111 (44)	106 (41)	100 (38)	91 (33)	111 (44)
Mean maximum °F (°C)	79.8 (26.6)	79.6 (26.4)	81.5 (27.5)	84.8 (29.3)	83.2 (28.4)	82.8 (28.2)	86.0 (30.0)	87.3 (30.7)	91.2 (32.9)	90.8 (32.7)	85.1 (29.5)	77.1 (25.1)	95.1 (35.1)
Mean daily maximum °F (°C)	66.6 (19.2)	66.5 (19.2)	68.2 (20.1)	70.8 (21.6)	72.0 (22.2)	74.7 (23.7)	78.0 (25.6)	79.1 (26.2)	78.4 (25.8)	75.8 (24.3)	70.6 (21.4)	65.9 (18.8)	72.2 (22.3)
Daily mean °F (°C)	57.3 (14.1)	57.5 (14.2)	59.5 (15.3)	61.9 (16.6)	64.3 (17.9)	67.5 (19.7)	70.6 (21.4)	71.3 (21.8)	70.3 (21.3)	66.9 (19.4)	61.3 (16.3)	56.6 (13.7)	63.8 (17.6)
Mean daily minimum °F (°C)	48.0 (8.9)	48.5 (9.2)	50.8 (10.4)	53.1 (11.7)	56.6 (13.7)	60.3 (15.7)	63.1 (17.3)	63.6 (17.6)	62.2 (16.8)	57.9 (14.4)	51.9 (11.1)	47.3 (8.5)	55.3 (12.9)
Mean minimum °F (°C)	39.6 (4.2)	40.3 (4.6)	42.6 (5.9)	45.6 (7.6)	50.0 (10.0)	54.5 (12.5)	57.3 (14.1)	58.3 (14.6)	55.1 (12.8)	50.6 (10.3)	44.1 (6.7)	39.3 (4.1)	36.0 (2.2)
Record low °F (°C)	24 (−4)	24 (−4)	31 (−1)	32 (0)	32 (0)	43 (6)	46 (8)	43 (6)	40 (4)	39 (4)	28 (−2)	30 (−1)	24 (−4)
Average precipitation inches (mm)	3.25 (83)	3.46 (88)	2.16 (55)	0.60 (15)	0.38 (9.7)	0.06 (1.5)	0.02 (0.51)	0.00 (0.00)	0.13 (3.3)	0.56 (14)	0.94 (24)	2.49 (63)	14.05 (357.01)
Average precipitation days (≥ 0.01 in)	5.9	5.7	4.3	1.8	0.9	0.3	0.5	0.0	0.3	1.4	2.5	4.9	28.5
Source 1: NOAA
Source 2: National Weather Service

== Demographics ==
Historical population
Year	1920	1930	1940	1950	1960	1970	1980	1990	2000	2010	2020
Pop.	503	5,669	8,976	19,720	32,163	34,451	38,139	38,793	38,816	38,883	40,779
±%	—	+1027.0%	+58.3%	+119.7%	+63.1%	+7.1%	+10.7%	+1.7%	+0.1%	+0.2%	+4.9%
U.S. Decennial Census

=== 2020 ===
Culver City, California – Racial and ethnic composition Note: the US Census treats Hispanic/Latino as an ethnic category. This table excludes Latinos from the racial categories and assigns them to a separate category. Hispanics/Latinos may be of any race.
Race / Ethnicity (NH = Non-Hispanic)	Pop 1980	Pop 1990	Pop 2000	Pop 2010	Pop 2020	% 1980	% 1990	% 2000	% 2010	% 2020
White alone (NH)	25,214	22,414	18,675	18,649	18,544	66.11%	57.78%	48.11%	47.96%	45.47%
Black or African American alone (NH)	3,039	3,881	4,536	3,587	3,143	7.97%	10.00%	11.69%	9.23%	7.71%
Native American or Alaska Native alone (NH)	204	176	111	65	47	0.53%	0.45%	0.29%	0.17%	0.12%
Asian alone (NH)	3,137	4,555	4,631	5,656	6,832	8.23%	11.74%	11.93%	14.55%	16.75%
Native Hawaiian or Pacific Islander alone (NH)	3,137	4,555	72	70	92	8.23%	11.74%	0.19%	0.18%	0.23%
Other race alone (NH)	117	100	142	220	379	0.31%	0.26%	0.37%	0.57%	0.93%
Mixed race or Multiracial (NH)	x	x	1,450	1,611	3,010	x	x	3.74%	4.14%	7.38%
Hispanic or Latino (any race)	6,428	7,667	9,199	9,025	8,732	16.85%	19.76%	23.70%	23.21%	21.41%
Total	38,139	38,793	38,816	38,883	40,779	100.00%	100.00%	100.00%	100.00%	100.00%

=== Ethnic groups ===
According to the 2024 Census, the population of Culver City was 44.8% Non-Hispanic White, 20% Hispanic, 19.8% Asian, and 6.65% Black or African American.

According to Mapping L.A., Mexican and German were the most common ancestries in 2000. Mexico and the Philippines were the most common foreign places of birth.

== Economy ==
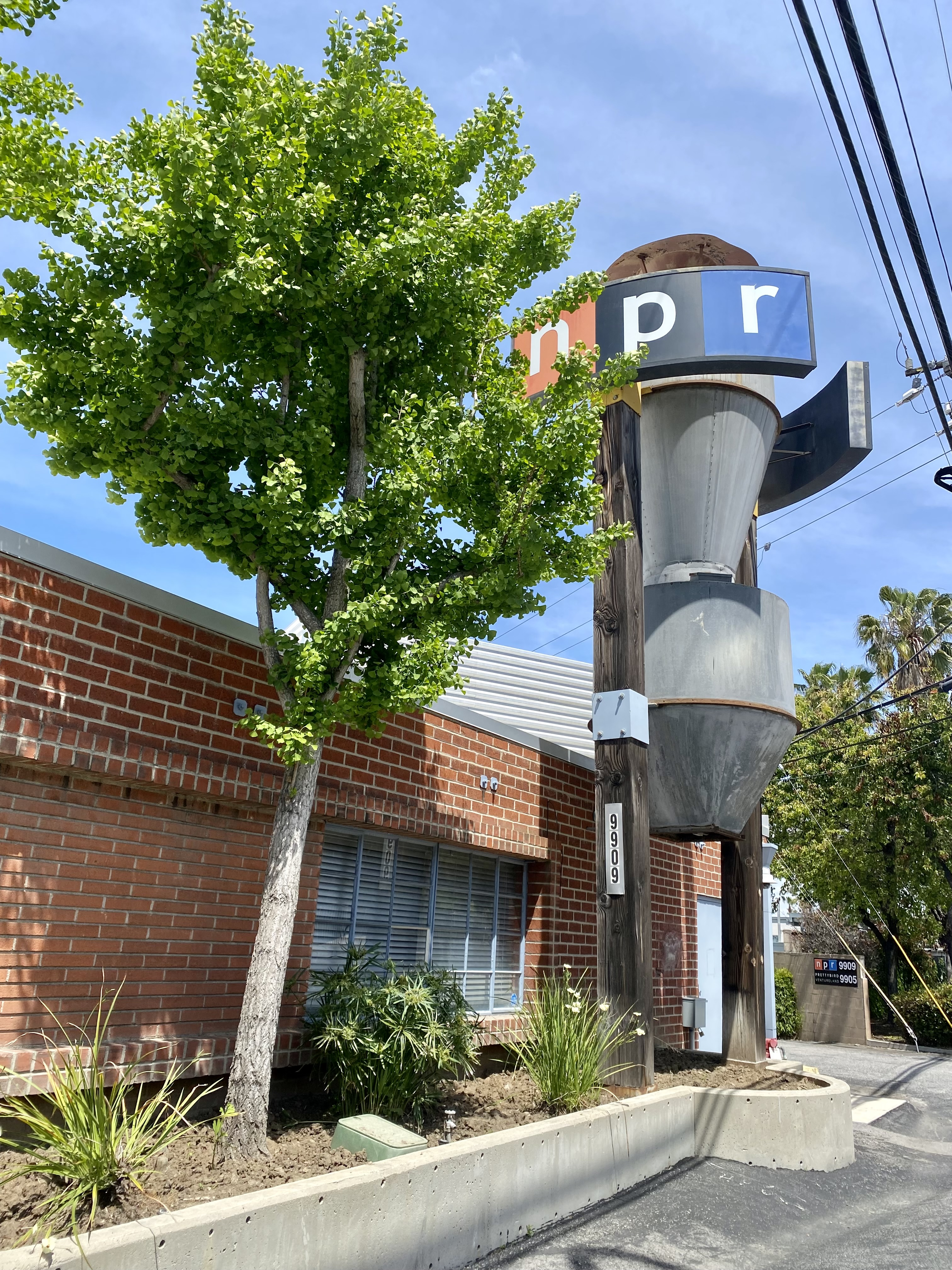
NPR West, located in a former furniture factory, has had offices in Culver City since 2002.

Corporations with headquarters in Culver City include Beats Audio, MedMen, NantHealth, Sweetgreen and Sony Pictures Entertainment.

=== Largest employers ===
According to the city's FY2024–25 Annual Comprehensive Financial Report, the top employers in the city were:

#	Employer	# of Employees
1	Sony Pictures Entertainment	3,900
2	Apple	2,265
3	Westfield Culver City	2,000
4	Amazon Studios	1,937
5	TikTok	1,600
6	Southern California Hospital at Culver City	1,242
7	Culver City Unified School District	1,214
8	City of Culver City	889
9	Costco	574
10	Target	466

=== Movie and television production ===
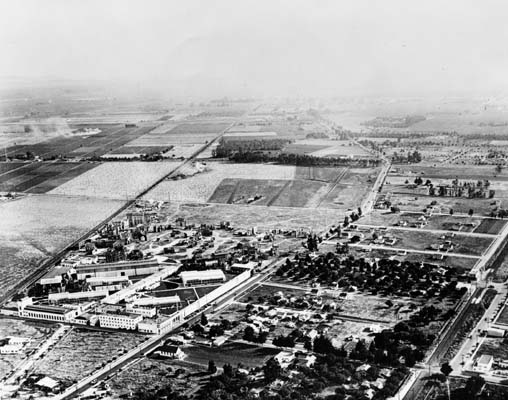
MGM Studios (now Sony Pictures Studios), 1922

Hundreds of movies have been produced on the lots of Culver City's studios: Sony Pictures Studios (originally MGM Studios), Culver Studios, and the former Hal Roach Studios. In 2017, Amazon MGM Studios announced plans to build a studio in Culver City.

=== Businesses ===
- Westfield Culver City, a shopping mall.
- Beats Electronics
- Disney Digital Network
- MedMen
- NPR West
- Sony Pictures Studios
- The Ripped Bodice, one of the first romance novel bookstores in the northern hemisphere
- TikTok USDS

== Arts and culture ==
=== Museums ===
The Wende Museum possesses a collection of Soviet and East German visual art and everyday artifacts to promote an understanding of Soviet art, history and culture between 1945 and 1991. Additionally, the Museum of Jurassic Technology, founded in 1988 by David Hildebrand Wilson and Diana Drake Wilson, provides over 30 permanent exhibits displaying an eclectic mix of items that blend fact and fiction.

=== Library ===
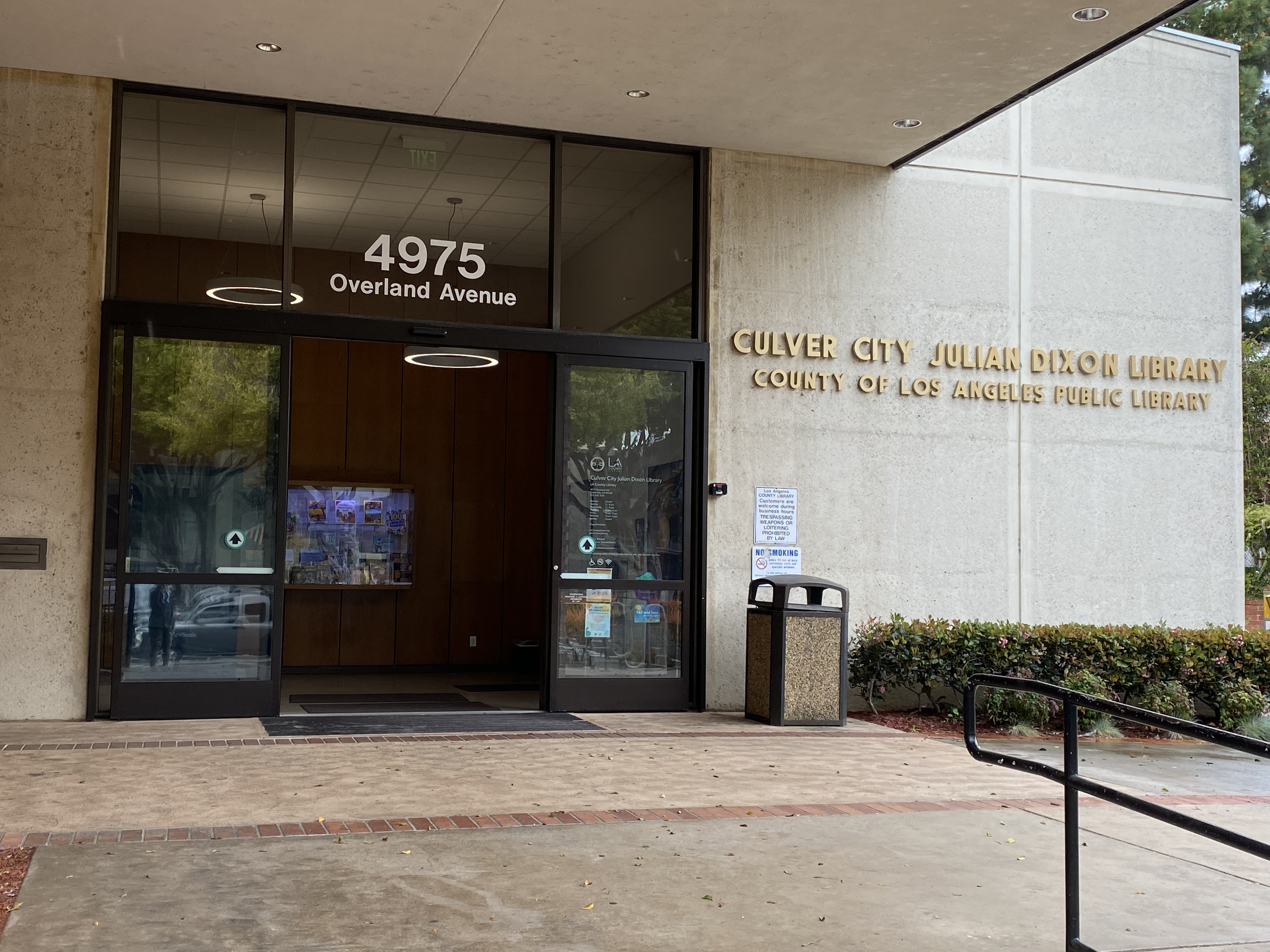
Julian Dixon Library, County of Los Angeles Public Library

The County of Los Angeles Public Library operates the Julian Dixon Culver City Branch.

=== Architecture ===
The architecture of Culver City reflects its history as an early location for film studios and, more recently, as a site for architectural experimentation, particularly for the projects of Eric Owen Moss at the Hayden Tract. The architecture office of Morphosis headquartered here. Styles represented include Mission Revival and Colonial Revival from the city's early days, to the PWA Moderne of the 1930s, to modern, postmodern, and deconstructivist styles from the past few decades. Notable architectural landmarks include:

- Ivy Substation (1907), a Mission Revival building that houses The Actors' Gang
- Culver Studios (1918–1920), offices in the style of a Colonial Revival mansion
- Culver Hotel (Curlett and Beelman, 1924), a six-story brick flatiron

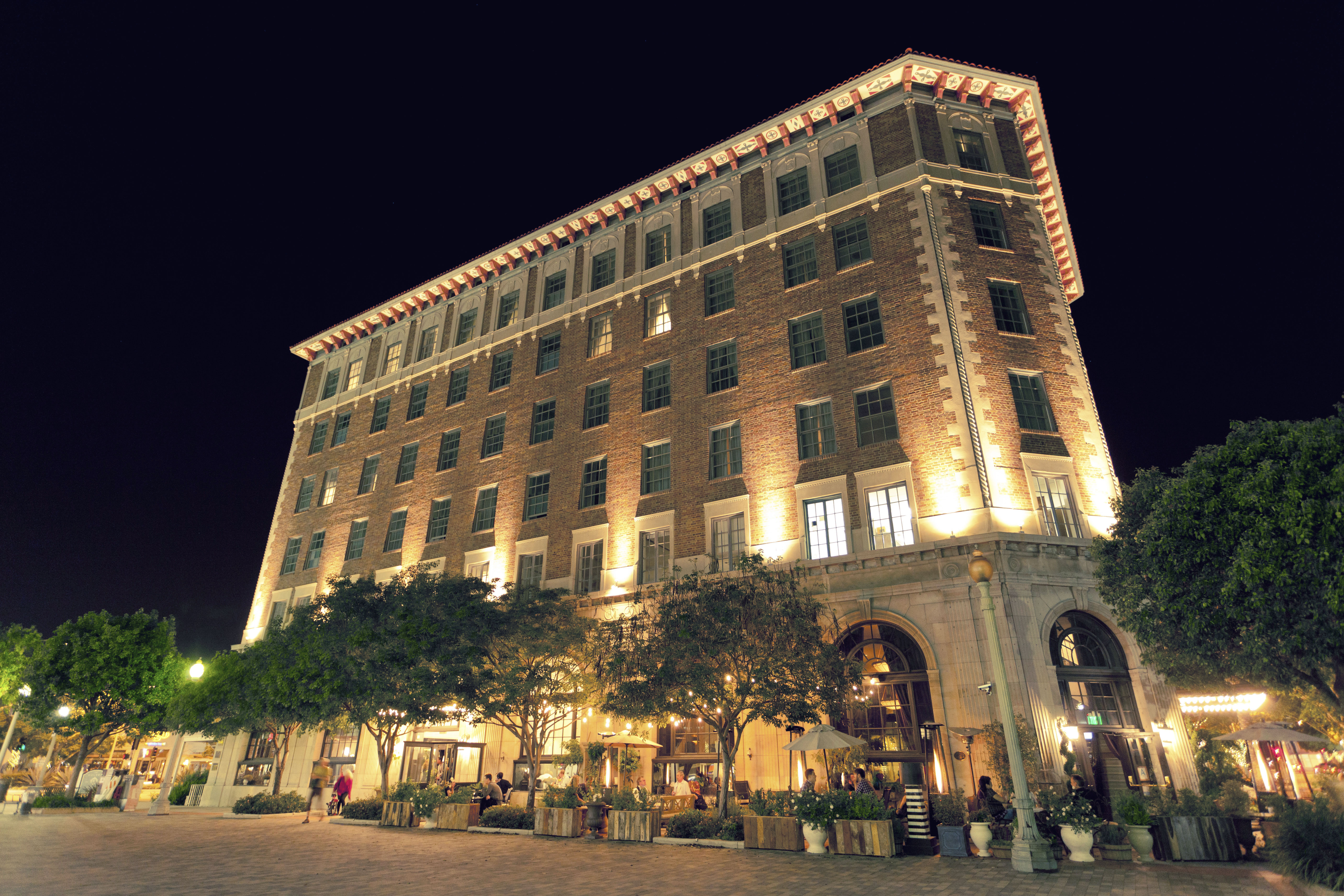
Culver Hotel, built 1925

- Helms Bakery (1930), in PWA Moderne style
- Kirk Douglas Theatre (1946)
- St. Augustine Catholic Church (1957), a Gothic Revival church
- Robert Frost Auditorium, at Culver City High School, 4401 Elenda St. Constructed in 1963–64, its unique scallop shell design became an instant modern architectural landmark for the city. Its original 1,250-seat design was the inspiration of then 26-year-old Andrew Nasser, a consulting structural engineer with Johnson & Nielsen. Credit was claimed, however, by Ralph Flewelling of Flewelling & Moody, the project architects. The record was set straight 54 years later at the unveiling of a $16.3M renovation in 2018. Capacity was increased to 1,300 seats, acoustics improved, and a new 40-foot high steel proscenium arch supports catwalks, lighting, and air conditioning (Hodgetts + Fung architects).
- Platform (2016)

== Parks and recreation ==
The City of Culver City Parks and Recreation department operates 14 outdoor parks within city limits.

== Government ==
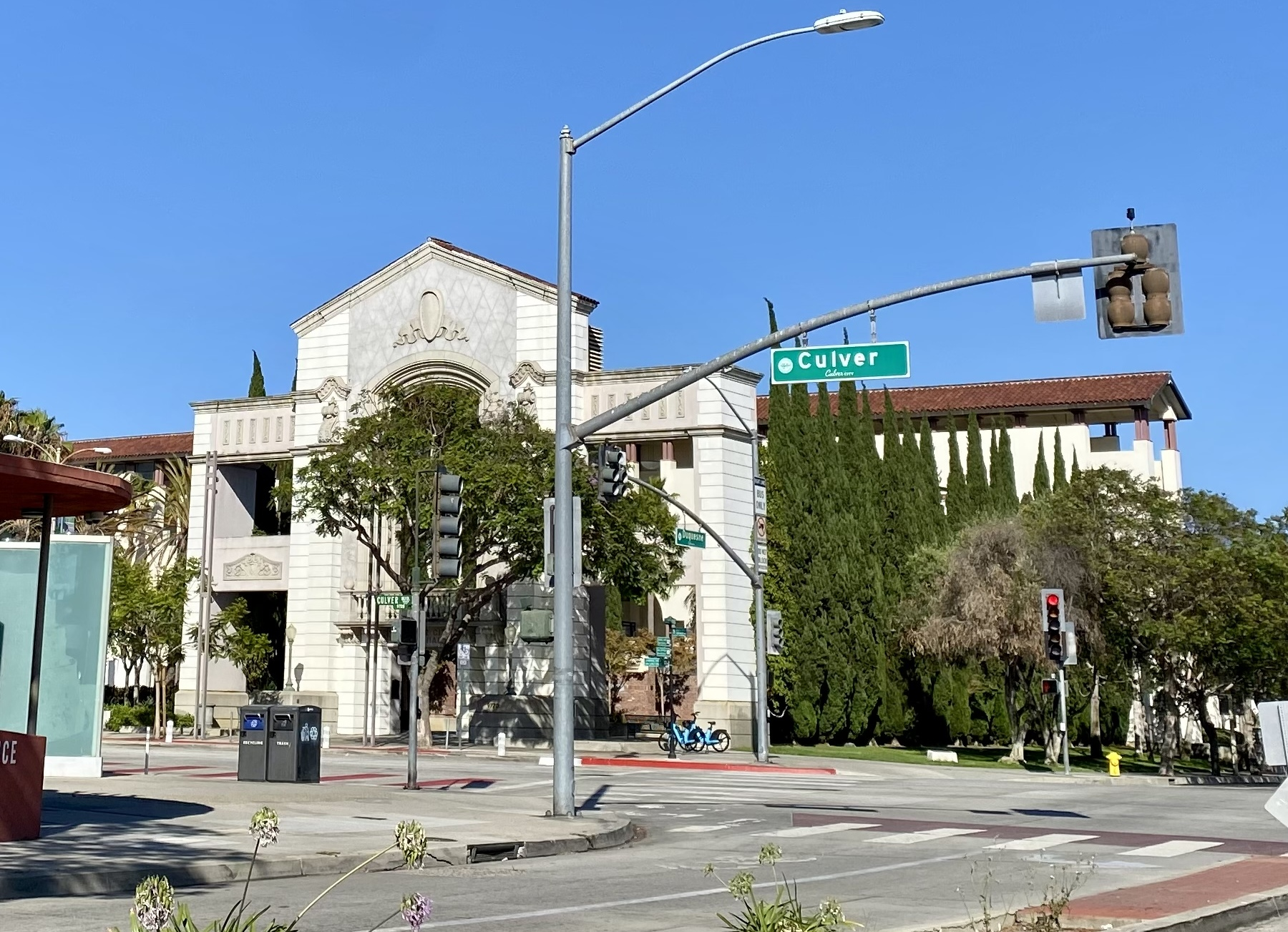
Culver City city hall

Culver City has a five-member city council.

In Los Angeles County, Culver City is in the 2nd Supervisorial District, represented by Holly Mitchell.

In the California State Legislature, Culver City is in the 28th senatorial district, represented by Democrat Lola Smallwood-Cuevas, and in the 55th Assembly district, represented by Democrat Isaac Bryan.

In the United States House of Representatives, Culver City is split between California's 36th congressional district, represented by Democrat Ted Lieu, and California's 37th congressional district, represented by Democrat Sydney Kamlager-Dove.

== Education ==
=== Primary and secondary schools ===
The Culver City Unified School District administers the following public schools:

- Culver City High School
- Culver City Middle School
- Culver City Unified School District iAcademy
- Culver Park High School
- Culver City Adult School
- El Marino Elementary School
- El Rincon Elementary School
- Farragut Elementary School
- La Ballona Elementary School
- Linwood E. Howe Elementary School

=== Private schools ===
- STAR Prep Academy, a middle and high school that shares its campus with an exotic wildlife rescue center.
- The Willows Community School (elementary and middle school)
- Turning Point School (elementary and middle school).
- Kayne Eras Center (school for disabled).
- Wildwood School (primary school with secondary and high school located in the Sawtelle neighborhood of Los Angeles).
- Echo Horizon School (primary through middle school).

=== Colleges and universities ===
- Antioch University Los Angeles, a nonprofit liberal arts college in Culver City's Corporate Pointe district.

== Media ==
=== Newspapers ===
- Culver City Call
- The Citizen

=== Movies ===
Movies filmed or partially filmed in Culver City include:

- The Wizard of Oz
- The Thin Man
- Gone with the Wind
- Rebecca
- Tarzan
- King Kong
- Grease
- Raging Bull
- E.T. the Extra-Terrestrial
- The Man with Two Brains
- City Slickers
- Air Force One
- Wag the Dog
- Contact
- Pee-wee's Big Adventure
- Tron
- Bewitched
- Fun with Dick and Jane
- Get Shorty
- Superbad
- Killers
- Dinner for Schmucks
- Lincoln Lawyer
- Moneyball
- Horrible Bosses
- Jack and Jill
- Think Like a Man
- The Campaign
- Matchstick Men

=== Television shows ===
Television shows filmed or partially filmed in Culver City include:

- Jeopardy!
- Las Vegas
- Gunsmoke
- Cougar Town
- Mad About You
- Lassie
- Hogan's Heroes
- Batman
- The Green Hornet
- Arrested Development
- The Andy Griffith Show
- Gomer Pyle, U.S.M.C.
- The Nanny
- Hell's Kitchen
- MasterChef
- Wheel of Fortune
- Tosh.0
- The Wonder Years
- CHiPs
- The Hogan Family
- South Park

== Infrastructure ==
=== Transportation ===
==== Transit ====
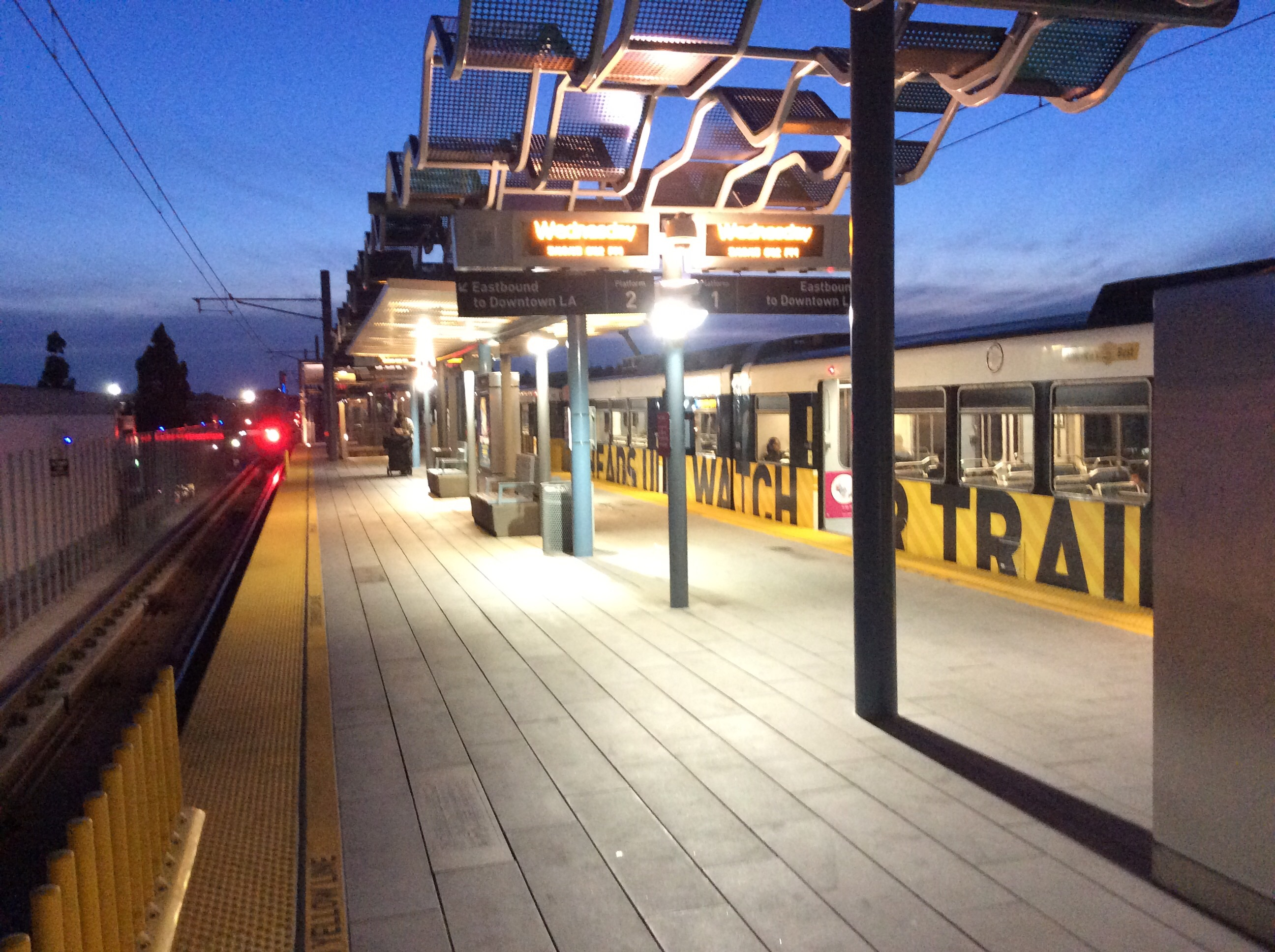
Platform, Culver City station

The Culver City station of the Los Angeles Metro E Line sits at the Culver Junction near Venice and Robertson Boulevards in Culver City. The E Line provides a light rail connection from Culver City to Downtown Los Angeles and East Los Angeles to the east and Downtown Santa Monica to the west, mostly following the right-of-way that the Pacific Electric Santa Monica Air Line used, also known as the Exposition Boulevard line. Culver City station was the western terminus of what was then known as the Expo Line from its opening on June 20, 2012, to the opening of Expo Line phase two on May 20, 2016.

Culver CityBus was founded on March 4, 1928, making it the second oldest municipal bus line in California and the oldest public transit bus system still operating in Los Angeles County. Big Blue Bus was founded on April 14, 1928. Culver CityBus operates seven regular bus lines as well as a short-term downtown circulator shuttle.

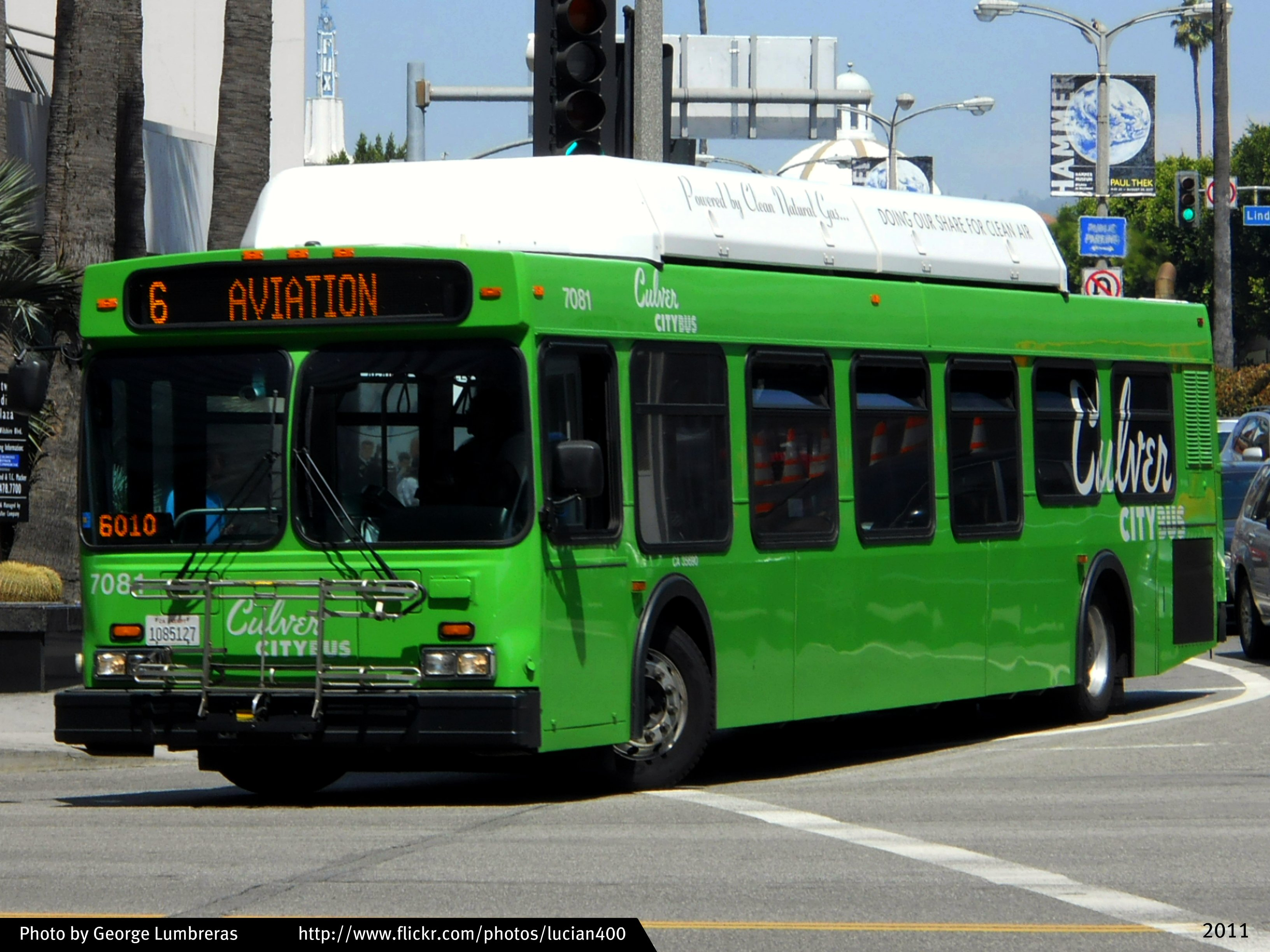
Culver CityBus near Wilshire and Westwood

The Culver City Transit Center in the Westfield Culver City parking serves as a bus depot for three Culver CityBus lines and two Metro bus lines. The Washington Fairfax Hub, just across the border of the City of Los Angeles under the I-10 freeway, connects residents to seven bus lines, two operated by Culver CityBus and five operated by Metro.

The Baldwin Hills Parklands Link is a shuttle service operated by Los Angeles County that stops at Stoneview Nature Center on weekends only.

==== Bike routes and pedestrian infrastructure ====
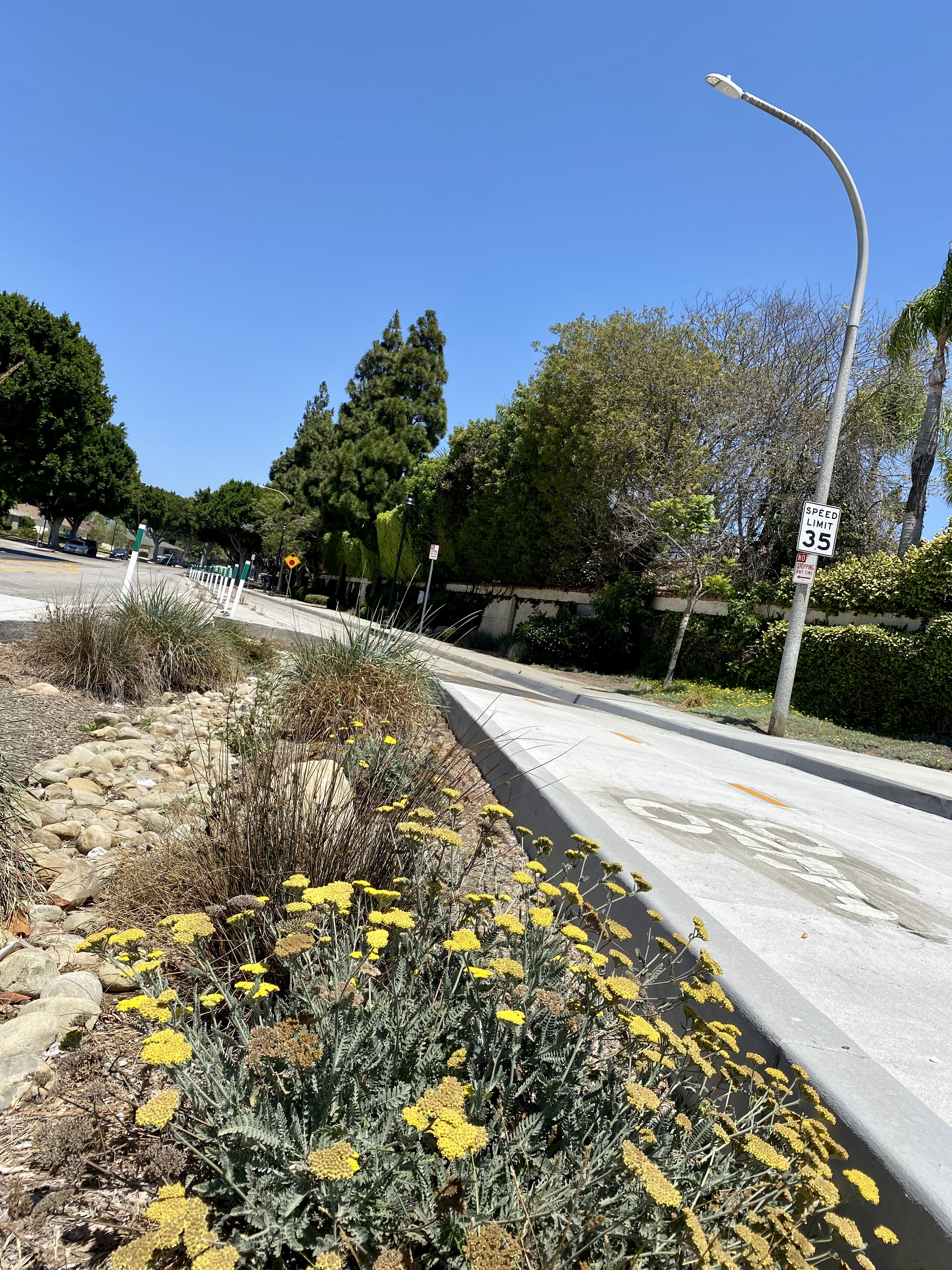
Elenda Bikeway, bioswale and two-lane protected section

- Culver Boulevard Median bike route
- Ballona Creek bike path, connecting to the Park to Playa Trail through the Baldwin Hills
- Elenda Street bikeway, 12-block route between Ballona Creek and Washington Boulevard
- Separated bike and bus lanes through downtown Culver City, part of the MoveCulverCity complete streets initiative
- Farragut Connector, locally known as "the Snicket"
- Ballona Creek pedestrian bridge between Culver City High School and Lindberg Park

==== Air travel ====
The city is served by the Los Angeles International Airport, about 7 miles (11 km) south of the city. Smaller nearby airports include Santa Monica Airport and Hawthorne Municipal Airport.

==== Freeways ====
Culver City is served by Interstate 405 (San Diego Freeway), Interstate 10 (Santa Monica Freeway), and California State Route 90 (Marina Freeway). California State Route 187 runs along Venice Boulevard in Culver City.

=== Public safety ===
Culver City is served by the Culver City Police Department, and the Culver City Fire Department, which operates three stations and a fire training facility.

=== Cemeteries ===
- Hillside Memorial Park Cemetery
- Holy Cross Cemetery

== Notable people ==
- Art Alexakis, musician, founder and lead singer of the band Everclear
- Drew Barrymore, actress
- Shayla Beesley, actress
- Big Boy, radio host
- Jack Black, actor
- Jackson Browne, singer, songwriter, and musician
- Jaleel Ahmad White, actor
- Michael Bumpus, NFL player, Seattle Seahawks
- Dean Byington, visual artist
- Gary Carter (1954–2012), Major League Baseball player, Hall of Famer
- Michael Chacon, professional fixed-gear bike rider
- Tiffany Cohen, double-gold champion in swimming at the 1984 Summer Olympics
- Glenn Cowan (1952–2004), table tennis player
- Carolyn Craig, actress
- Dee Dee Davis, actress
- Jennifer Finch (1966-2026), musician, photographer, actress
- Jeff Fisher, NFL coach
- Tim Foli (born 1950), Major League Baseball player
- Dick Gautier, actor
- Kron Gracie, son of Rickson Gracie, teaches Brazilian Jiu Jitsu in town
- Linda Gray, film, stage, and television actress, director, and producer
- Charles Herbert, actor
- Win Headley, NFL and CFL player
- Kelly Lytle Hernández, professor and Thomas E. Lifka Chair of History at UCLA, author, and MacArthur Fellowship recipient
- Howard Hughes, founder of Hughes Aircraft
- Helen Hunt, Oscar-winning actress
- HuskyStarcraft, aka Mike Lamond, YouTube commentator
- Darrin Jackson, Major League Baseball player and MLB sportscaster
- Taran Killam, actor and comedian
- Tim Layana (1964–1999), Major League Baseball pitcher
- Merry Lepper, set world record marathon time for women, December 16, 1963, in Culver City.
- Masiela Lusha, Albanian-American actress and poet
- Ron Mael, musician, member of Sparks
- Bill Monning, California State Senator
- Michael Richards, actor and comedian
- Michelle Horn, actress
- Michael Ruppert, journalist and former LAPD officer
- Ryan Sherriff (born 1990), Major League Baseball player
- Dick Stuart (1932–2002), Major League Baseball player
- Robert Trujillo, bass player with Suicidal Tendencies, Ozzy Osbourne, and Metallica
- Gwen Verdon, four-time Tony Award-winning actress
- Michael Whelan, artist and illustrator

== Sister cities ==
Culver City has five sister cities, as designated by Sister Cities International:

- Capo d'Orlando, Messina, Sicily, Italy
- Iksan, South Korea
- Kaizuka, Japan
- Lethbridge, Alberta, Canada
- Uruapan, Michoacán, Mexico

== See also ==
- List of sundown towns in the United States
- Westside (Los Angeles County)
