= Culver City Call =

First newspaper published in Culver City, California

The weekly Culver City Call was the first newspaper published in Culver City, California.

== History ==
The paper was founded in 1913 by S.C. Perrine, who was also secretary of the Culver City Chamber of Commerce.

This 1915 advertisement in the Los Angeles Times for the Culver City subdivision displays an image of a Culver City Call front page.

In 1916 Perrine sold the Journal and The Coast Press to W.E. Woodbury and L.E. Taylor, who installed a $6,000 print shop in the Field Building on Venice Boulevard to print the two newspapers. The Call was purchased in the same year by W.E. McLernon, who had worked for the Los Angeles Examiner and the Los Angeles Express.

McLernon died of acute gastritis in Los Angeles on June 23, 1917, leaving ownership of the paper to his wife, Katherine, and C.W. Roach became editor. Mrs. McLernon then sold the newspaper.

H.P. Bee was the next editor and publisher. C.H. Garrigues contracted to purchase the newspaper in 1924, but the sheriff "turned me out," as he put it.
