= Platform (shopping center) =

Shopping center in Los Angeles

Platform is a community shopping center in Culver City, on the Westside of Los Angeles. Platform consists of about 50,000 square feet (4,600 m^{2}) of retail and restaurant space and 80,000 square feet (7,400 m^{2}) of creative and office space, in a group of three-story buildings on Washington Boulevard near to Landmark Avenue. It has been referred to as a boutique retail center or design quarter, and houses boutiques, fitness studios, offices and restaurants in a repurposed industrial building. Tenants are required to provide experiences that are unique to Platform, which has helped the mall succeed. For example, Artist Jen Stark painted an 80-foot-high mural on the side of the building. Other elements include brightly colored tables and chairs and a curated music playlist featuring artists such as Grimes and Glass Animals.

The center won the annual LA Architectural Awards in 2017.
