= Harry Culver =

American real estate developer and founder of Culver City (1880–1946)

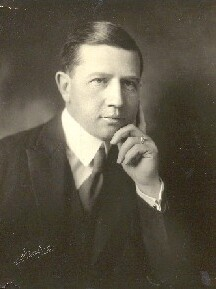
- Culver, ca. 1913
- Born: Harry Hazel Culver; January 22, 1880; Milford, Nebraska, U.S.
- Died: August 17, 1946 (aged 66); Los Angeles, California, U.S.
- Resting place: Inglewood Park Cemetery
- Education: Doane College; University of Nebraska
- Occupations: Real estate developer, philanthropist
- Spouse(s): Eunice Richardson Lillian Roberts (m. 1916)
- Children: 1

Harry Hazel Culver (January 22, 1880 – August 17, 1946) was a real estate developer and promoter, best known as the founder of Culver City, California.

After attending liberal arts college Doane College for a year, Culver studied business at the University of Nebraska for 3 years. From 1901 to about 1904, he worked in the Philippines in the mercantile business and as a reporter for the Manila Times and special customs agent.

In Manila he wed Eunice Richardson of Lincoln, Nebraska. He began working in real estate in Southern California in 1910 for Isaac Newton Van Nuys.

In 1913, in a speech at the California Club in Los Angeles, Culver announced his plans for what was to become Culver City. Local voters rejected the land's annexation to LA in 1914, whereupon Culver founded the Culver Investment Company. Supported by a 59–0 vote, Culver City became incorporated on September 20, 1917, with a population of 530.

Once the president of the California Association of Realtors, Culver served as president of the National Association of Realtors in 1923. The following year, he moved his offices to the second floor of Hotel Hunt, the building of which he had also supported. Culver served locally in elected office and promoted the city with picnics, leading tours with box lunches, and advertising "All Roads Lead to Culver City". Culver served locally in elected office before his death in Hollywood, California. He advertised Culver City as: "See this model little white city, scarcely a year and a half old." (LA Herald, March 12, 1915). In 1927 he oversaw the issuing of the following opinion which makes it explicitly clear what he meant: "The Los Angeles Realty Board recommends that Realtors should not sell property to other than Caucasian in territories occupied by them. Deed and Covenant Restrictions probably are the only way that the matter can be controlled; and Realty Boards should be interested. This is the general opinion of all boards in the state."

== Early life ==
Culver was born in Milford, Nebraska, the middle child of five of Jacob H. and Ada L. (Davison) Culver, who lived on a farm. At age 18, he enlisted in the Spanish–American War and served as a corporal and sergeant.

== Personal life ==
Culver enjoyed horseback riding, swimming, and playing ice hockey. In June 1916, he married actress Lillian Roberts, (Lillian Culver) who died in 1999 at the age of 103. Their daughter and only child, Patricia, was born on August 11, 1917.

Harry gave about 600 speeches a year, thus the Culver family traveled broadly and often. In honor of his father, Culver founded the Pacific Military Academy. Patricia Culver Battle remained connected to Culver City until her death in 2001. Culver has two living grandsons, Dr. John Battle living in Tacoma, Washington, and Chris Wilde in Seattle, Washington.

Culver is also known for attempting to resuscitate F. Scott Fitzgerald. Fitzgerald's live-in partner, Sheilah Graham, witnessed Fitzgerald experience a heart attack and ran to the manager of the building at the time for help, Culver. Upon entering the apartment to assist Fitzgerald, Culver stated, "I'm afraid he's dead."

== Dedication ==
On March 26, 2006, Culver City's Cultural Affairs Division with the Culver City Historical Society dedicated a sculpture of Harry Culver, commissioned to artist De L'Esprie with the National Heritage Collectors Society, founded by David L. Spellerberg. The artwork, titled "A Moment in Time", is part of the city's Art in Public Places program. Culver's grandson, Dr. John Battle, and his family participated in the dedication ceremony.
