= Westfield Culver City =

Coordinates: 33.9852°N 118.395°W

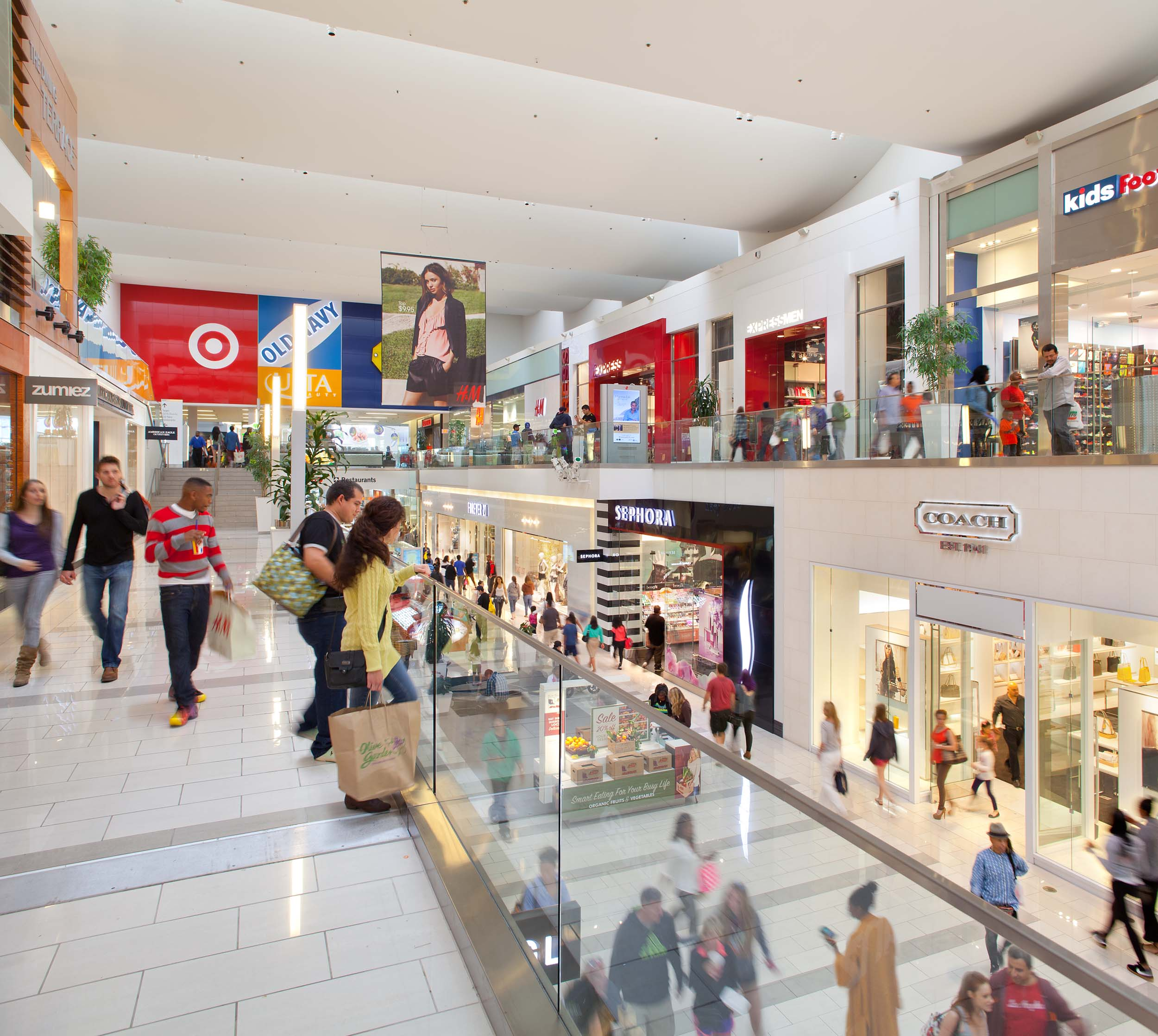
- Interior view of Westfield Culver City in 2014.
- Location: Culver City, California, U.S.
- Address: 6000 Sepulveda Boulevard, Culver City, CA 90230-6482
- Opened: October 6, 1975; 51 years ago
- Previous names: Fox Hills Mall (1975–1998); Westfield Shoppingtown Fox Hills (1998–2005); Westfield Fox Hills (2005–2009)
- Developer: The Hahn Company and Carter Hawley Hale Properties, Inc.
- Manager: Unibail-Rodamco-Westfield
- Owner: Unibail-Rodamco-Westfield
- Architect: Gruen & Associates
- Num. of stores: 172 (at peak)
- Num. of anchor tenants: 8
- Floor area: 1,061,687 sq ft (98,633.9 m^{2})
- Floors: 2-3 (1 in Best Buy, Hollister, H&M, Nordstrom Rack, and Target, 3 in JCPenney and Macy's)
- Website: www.westfield.com/united-states/culvercity

Westfield Culver City (formerly known as the Fox Hills Mall) is a shopping mall in Culver City, California, owned by Unibail-Rodamco-Westfield SE. The mall features JCPenney, Macy's, Best Buy, Target, and Old Navy. The mall features prominent specialty retailers such as Adidas, MAC Cosmetics, True Religion, Miniso, Uniqlo, Forever 21 and H&M, as well as restaurants, including a food court.

== History ==
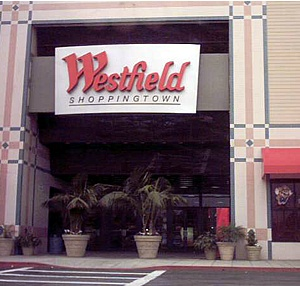
Opening entrance at the mall seen in March 2005.

Opened on October 6, 1975, the Fox Hills Mall was one of the first 3-level malls in California; it was a joint-venture between The Hahn Company and Carter Hawley Hale Properties, Inc. Gruen Associates were the project architects, but The Broadway was designed by William L. Pereira & Associates.

Situated on a 37-acre (150,000 m^{2}) site, the mall opened with:

- The Broadway (192,470 square feet (17,881 m^{2})) (became Macy's in 1996)
- May Co. (147,845 square feet (13,735.2 m^{2})) (became Robinsons-May in 1993)
- JCPenney (201,780 square feet (18,746 m^{2})) – opened on January 14, 1976
- 80 of the eventual total of 131 (329,271 square feet (30,590.3 m^{2}) of mall shops – including Harris & Frank and Lerner's

The total area was (902,566 square feet (83,851.1 m^{2})) including outbuildings of 30,200 square feet (2,810 m^{2}). There was parking for 4,491 cars, including 2,400 in a parking structure.

Notable elements of its original design were a glass-and-steel "theme" staircase in the center of the mall, as well as the angled bridges which connected the multiple levels. Westfield America, Inc., a precursor to Westfield Group, acquired the shopping center in 1998 and renamed it "Westfield Shoppingtown Fox Hills", dropping the "Shoppingtown" name in June 2005. From 2005 to 2009, the mall was known as "Westfield Fox Hills".

The theme staircase was removed during the 2009 renovation. However, the bridges still remain as part of the center.

The former Robinsons-May department store closed in 2006 and was demolished in 2008 for a new wing including Target and a Best Buy store in 2009.

Following the government lockdown, Westfield Culver City had several new stores open, such as Miniso, Lovisa, Carter's, Uniqlo, and Intimissimi.

Central atrium from ground floor, 2026

== Dining terrace ==
At the top level of the mall, is a food court known as the 'dinning terrace.' Los Angeles food critic Jonathan Gold gave the dining terrace a complimentary review that highlighted the ethnic diversity of the food choices available: "After 60-odd years in Los Angeles, the city that practically invented the modern shopping center, a developer finally gets it...Fox Hills has always been among the most multiracial of Los Angeles malls, downhill from the posh African-American homes of Baldwin Hills and Ladera Heights, close to the Asian and Muslim enclaves of south Culver City, in proximity to Westchester and the Marina, Inglewood and Playa del Rey......Brilliant: not quite. But other mall operators would do well to pay attention."

== Transit access ==
The mall has a transit center hub called the Culver City Transit Center that is located in the parking lot located between Sepulveda Blvd and Slauson Ave, where transfers to many LACMTA and Culver CityBus lines can be made, including the Culver City route 6 bus to LAX. Line 6 on Sepulveda Boulevard runs along the Sepulveda corridor, connecting Westwood and UCLA to LAX Metro Transit Center's C & K lines. Key stops along the route include the HHLA Mall and the Westfield Culver City Transit Center.

== See also ==
- Westfield Group
