= Culver Hotel =

Historical building in Culver City, California, US

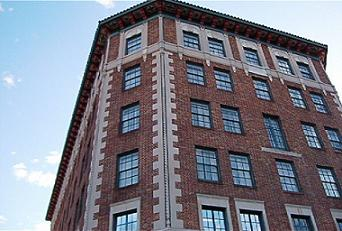

- Location within the Los Angeles metropolitan area Location within California Location within the United States
- Former names: Hotel Hunt

General information
- Architectural style: Art Deco
- Location: 9400 Culver Blvd., Culver City, California
- Opened: September 4, 1924

Technical details
- Floor count: 6

Design and construction
- Architects: Claud Beelman and Aleck Curlett
- Other designers: Harry Culver
- Culver Hotel
- U.S. National Register of Historic Places
- Coordinates: 34.02385°N 118.39427°W
- NRHP reference No.: 97000296
- Added to NRHP: April 14, 1997

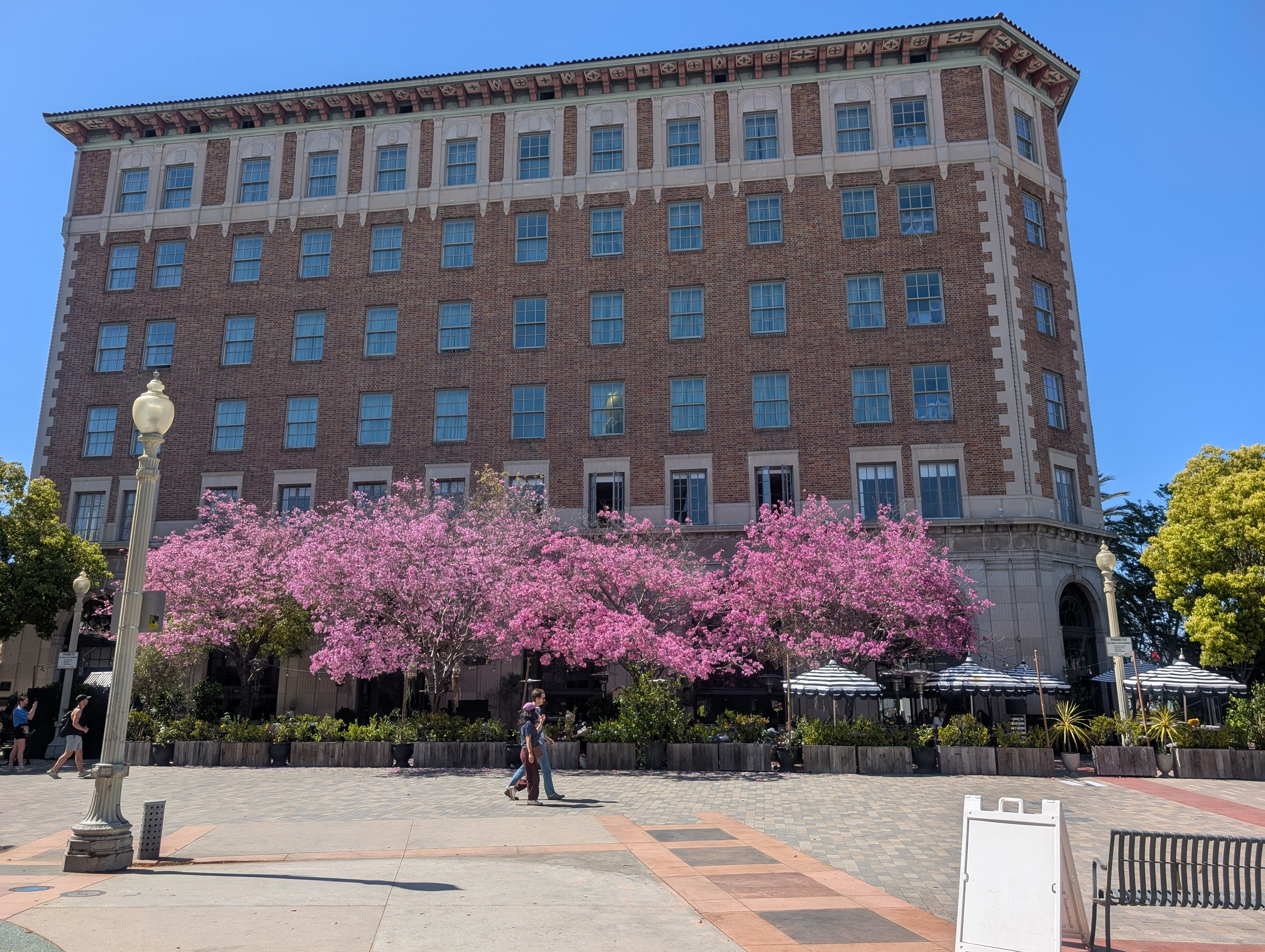
Exterior image of The Culver Hotel, 2025

The Culver Hotel is a national historical landmark in downtown Culver City, California. It was built by Harry Culver, the founder of Culver City, and opened on September 4, 1924, with local headlines announcing: "City packed with visitors for opening of Culver skyscraper." Originally named Hotel Hunt, and later known as Culver City Hotel, the six-story Renaissance Revival building was designed by Curlett & Beelman, the architecture firm behind renowned Art Deco buildings throughout Los Angeles, including downtown Los Angeles's Roosevelt and Eastern Columbia buildings.

As Culver City became a movie-making mecca beginning in the 1920s, the hotel welcomed legendary stars, some maintaining private residences for months at a time. Culver himself kept his office there.

Over the next few decades, the property fell into disrepair. In the 1980s, it was boarded up for a time and at risk of demolition. In the 1990s, the hotel was partially restored and reopened, joining the National Register of Historic Places in 1997.

Hotel restoration began in earnest in 2007 after a hotelier family purchased the property. Plumbing and electrical systems were upgraded, guestrooms and public spaces have been redone, handmade windows replaced, and public spaces re-imagined while maintaining the property's architectural integrity. The Culver Hotel also hosts live jazz and special events.

The flatiron-shaped building is next door to the historic Culver Studios and a few blocks from the Metro-Goldwyn-Mayer Studios, now Sony Pictures. The Culver Hotel has appeared in films and television, including Under the Rainbow, the Our Gang short Honkey Donkey, The Wonder Years, Party of Five, 7th Heaven, Last Action Hero, Sledge Hammer!, Stuart Little 2, Bones, Cougar Town, Perry Mason, and Touch.

== Owners ==
The hotel was built by Harry Culver, the founder of Culver City, on the site of the city's first movie theater. Mr. Culver's original office and vault are still on the second floor.

The hotel was later owned by Charlie Chaplin, who, legend has it, lost the property in a poker game to John Wayne, who owned the hotel for several years and eventually donated it to the YMCA.

The Culver Hotel was restored and reopened by Lou Catlett in the mid 1990s and was added to the National Register of Historic Places. The property was then purchased by Abraham Hu who ran it, in conjunction with his son Xing and nightclub restaurateur Eddie Harrah, for several years until 2007. The Culver was then sold to the Mallick family. Maya Mallick renovated it. The Culver Hotel is now a 4-star boutique hotel offering 46 guest rooms, a bar and dining scene, meeting and event spaces and live music every evening.

== Residents ==
The Culver Hotel has housed many stars as guests, including Clark Gable, Mickey Rooney, Greta Garbo, Judy Garland, Joan Crawford, Lana Turner, Red Skelton, Buster Keaton, Dorothy Dandridge, Douglas Fairbanks, Frank Sinatra, Ronald Reagan, all 4 members of the boy band 98 Degrees, Abby Lee Miller of Dance Moms, Countess Luann de Lesseps from The Real Housewives of New York City some even maintaining private residences for months at a time. Dwight D. Eisenhower even had a campaign office in the hotel during his run for president in 1952. The nearby Jazz Bakery has been known to put up world-renowned musicians at the Culver Hotel as well. Casts from Gone with the Wind and The Wizard of Oz stayed at the hotel during filming, including the more than 100 actors and actresses who played the Munchkins in the Oz film.

== Gallery ==
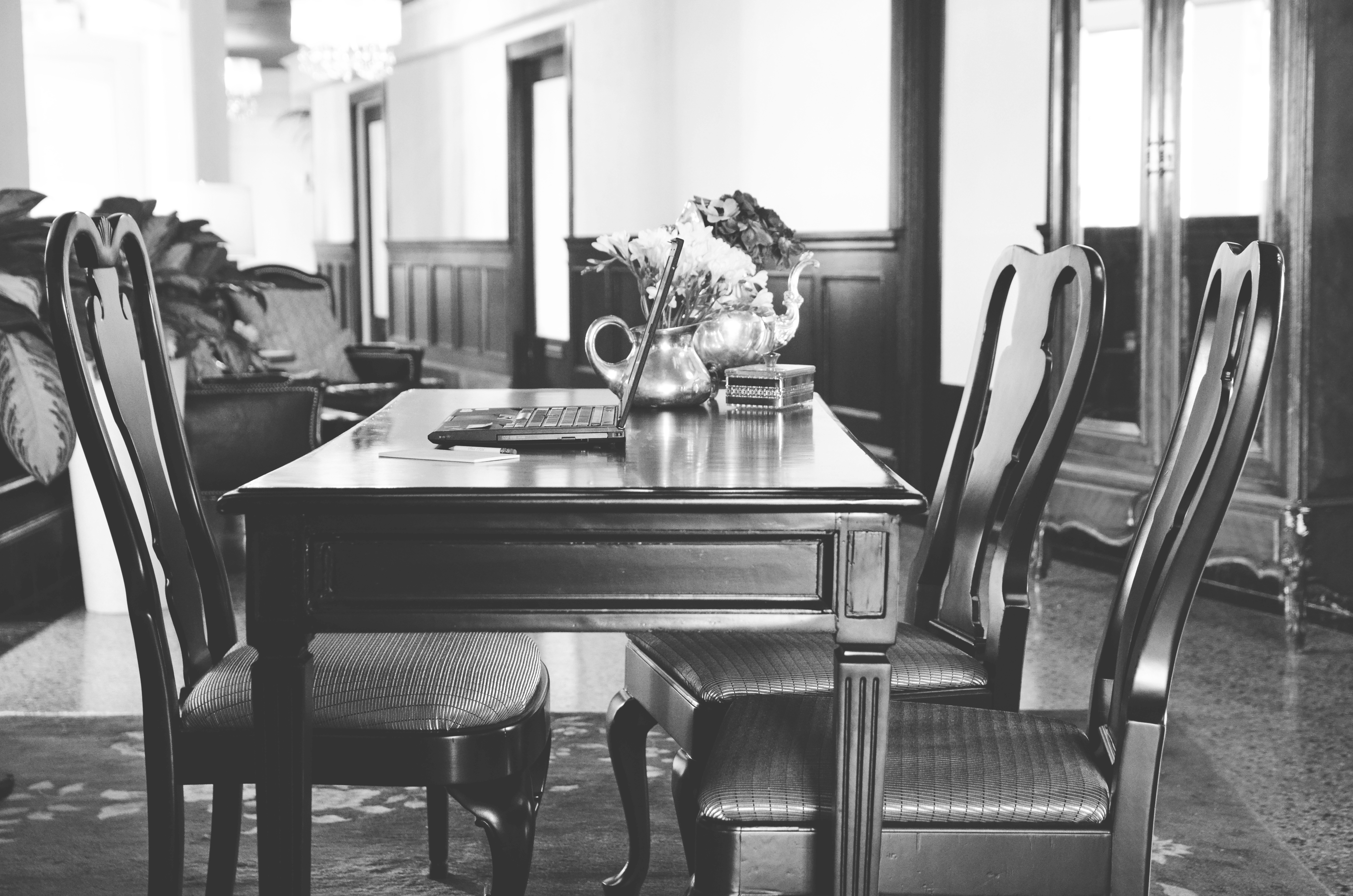
Event Space - Yello Heard on 2nd floor

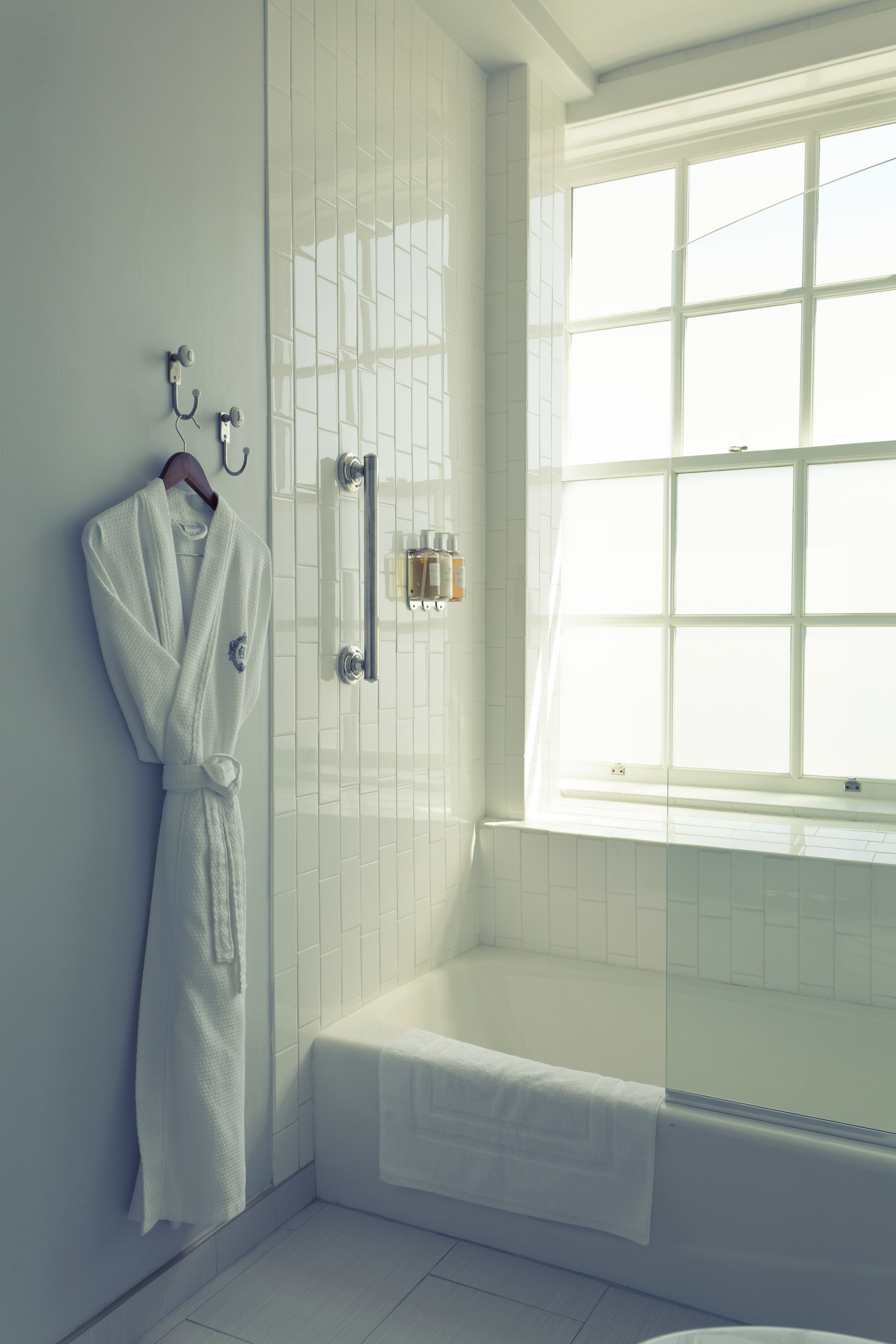
Guestroom robe and shower

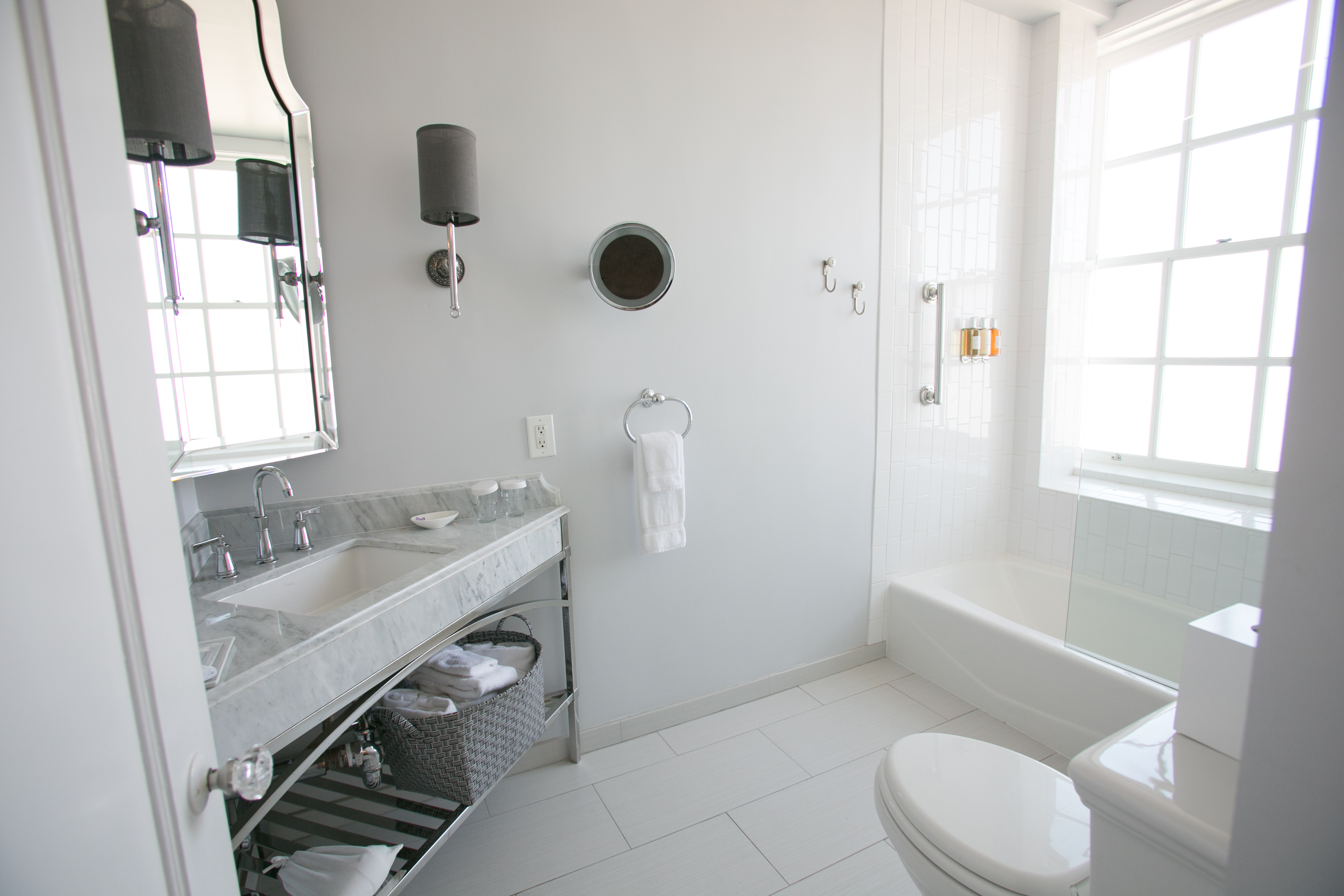
Guestroom bathroom

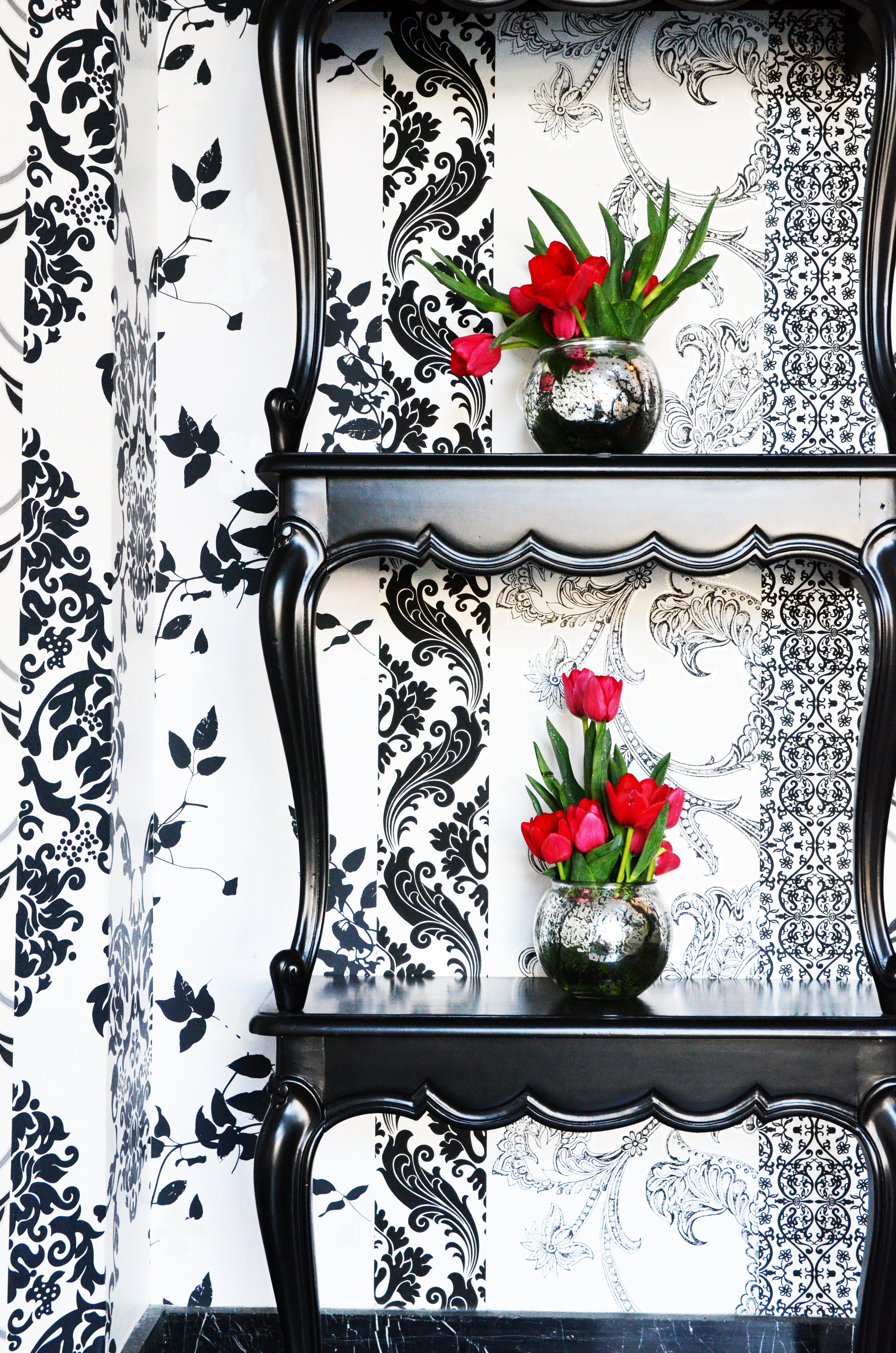
Culver bookcase

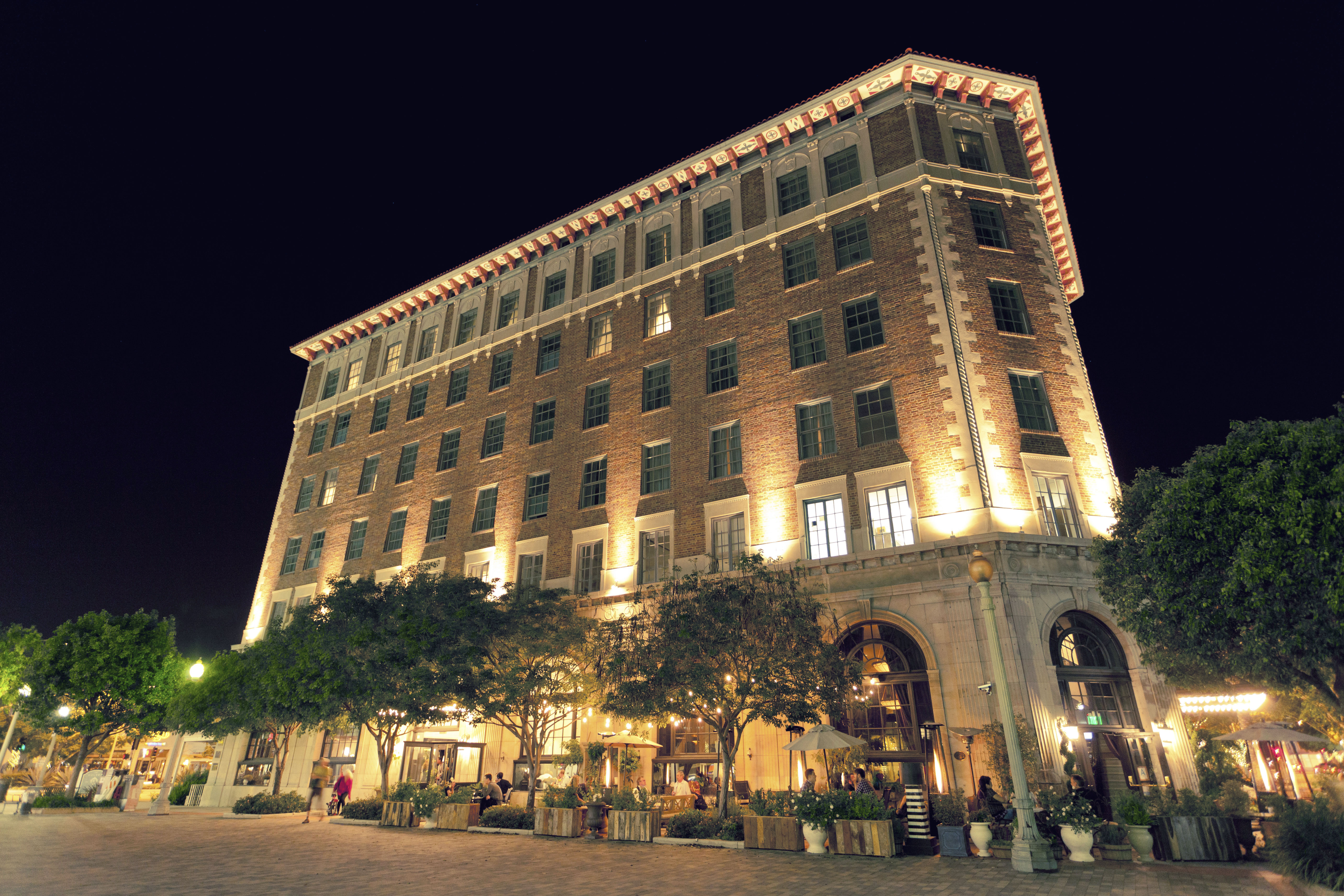
Culver Hotel at twilight

The front entrance at night

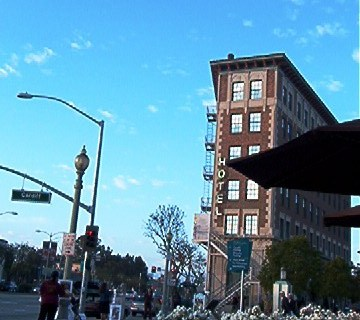
A full view of the Culver Hotel

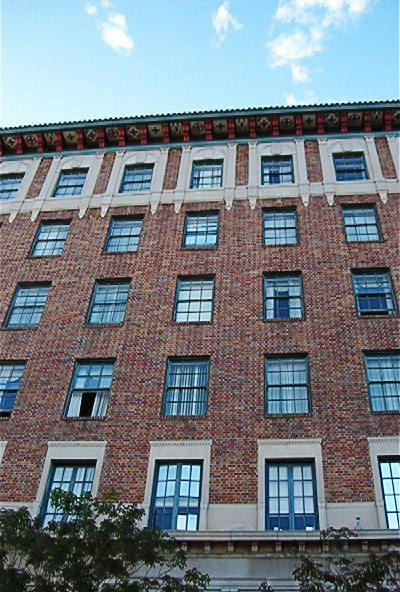
View of the side of the building

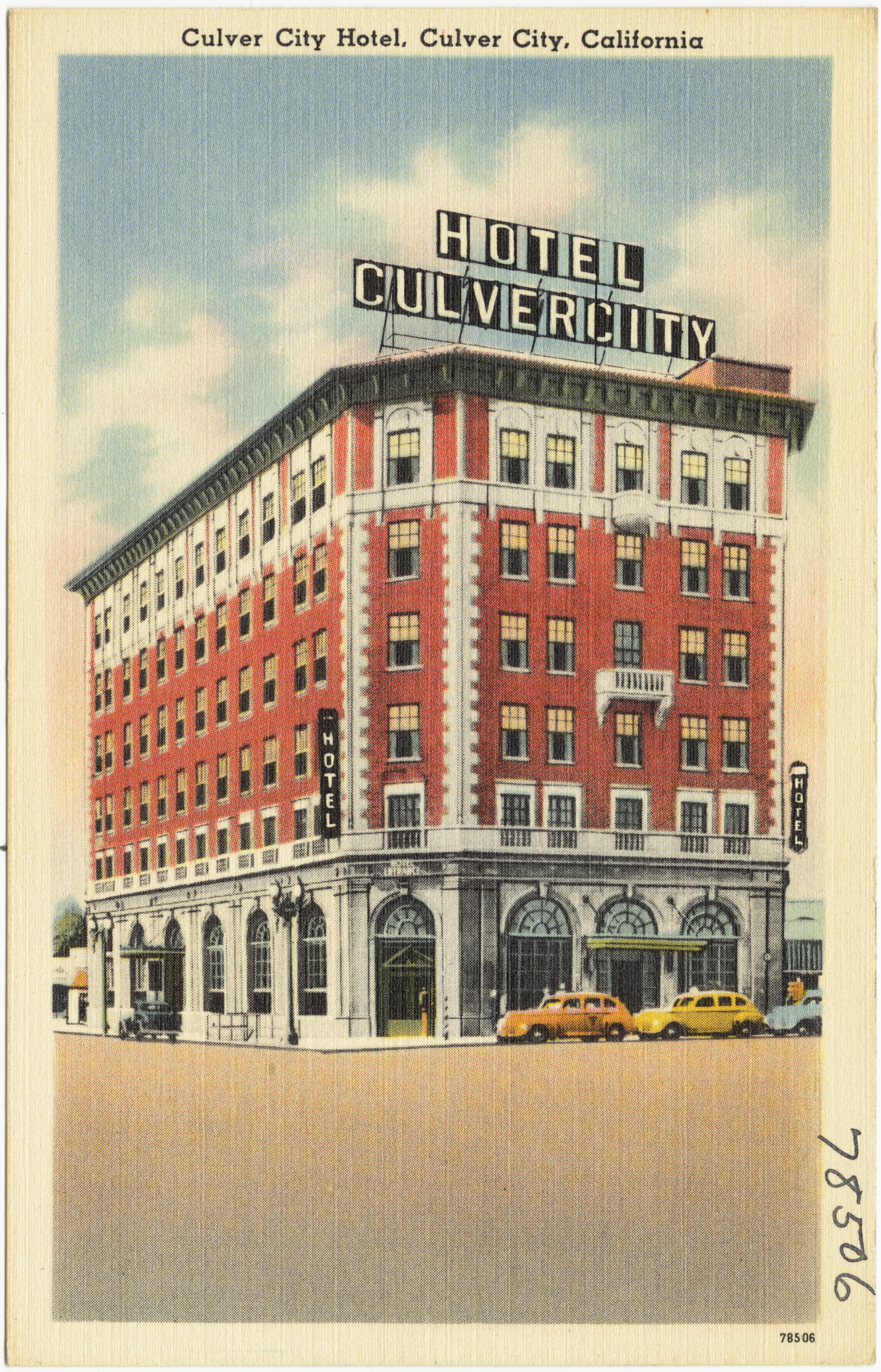
Postcard, circa 1940
