= STAR Prep Academy =

Coordinates: 34.012641°N 118.389641°W

Location
- 9000 Overland Ave #442, Culver City, CA 90230; Los Angeles, California

Information
- Opened: 2003
- Head of school: Thomas Valencia
- Grades: 6-12
- Enrollment: Roughly 33-71
- Website: http://www.starprepacademy.org/

STAR Prep Academy is a co-educational private middle school and high school for students in grades 6-12 located in Los Angeles, California. It is run by STAR, Inc. and provides education for about 60 students.

== Description ==
STAR Prep Academy was founded in 2003, and as of 2026, it has roughly 33-71 students enrolled, but there is no official headcount of educators.STAR Prep functions as a division of STAR, Inc; a non-profit educational program founded in 1986 that provides on-site consultants for over 42 school districts throughout California and is the largest provider of Gifted and Talented Education (GATE) instruction in the state. STAR Prep Academy has partnered with the STAR GATE Department to sponsor an annual Gifted Education conference. The first conference featured speakers Dr. James Webb, who established the SENG (Supporting Emotional Needs of Gifted) program at the School of Professional Psychology at Wright State University in 1981, and Dr. Robin Schader, Professor of Education at the University of Connecticut's Neag Center for Gifted Education and Talent Development.

The academy is associated with the STAR ECO Station, an international environmental science museum and exotic wildlife rescue and rehabilitation center dedicated to the mission of preservation through education. Students serve as interns at the STAR ECO Station and help with the care of the animals, and also participate annually in National Green Week. L.A. Parent Magazine praised STAR Prep for its innovations and eco-consciousness, hailing it as being one of the "new breed in education."

STAR Prep Academy is home to the GUIDES program which pairs students with local professionals to create meaningful partnerships.

== Curriculum ==
The school places a heavy emphasis on community service and makes it a graduation requirement. Students give time to social, political and environmental causes in their quest to become “Global Citizens”. Students are also encouraged to participate in the many STAR, Inc. events throughout the year, including the largest Children's Earth Day in Los Angeles. Students also engage in a broad range of creative activities, including filmmaking and media arts. STAR Prep is a 6-time winner of the California Student Media Festival, a two-time winner of the SENG Film Festival, as well as a finalist in the PAH-Fest Film Festival. STAR Prep Academy's Rock Band also performs at JamFest, an annual benefit for MusiCares.

== Affiliations ==
- CES - Coalition of Essential Schools
- CEEB – College Entrance Examination Board
- WACAC – Western Association for College Admission Counselors
- WASC – Western Association of Schools and Colleges
- Small Schools Coalition
