= Burbank, California =

City in the United States

- City
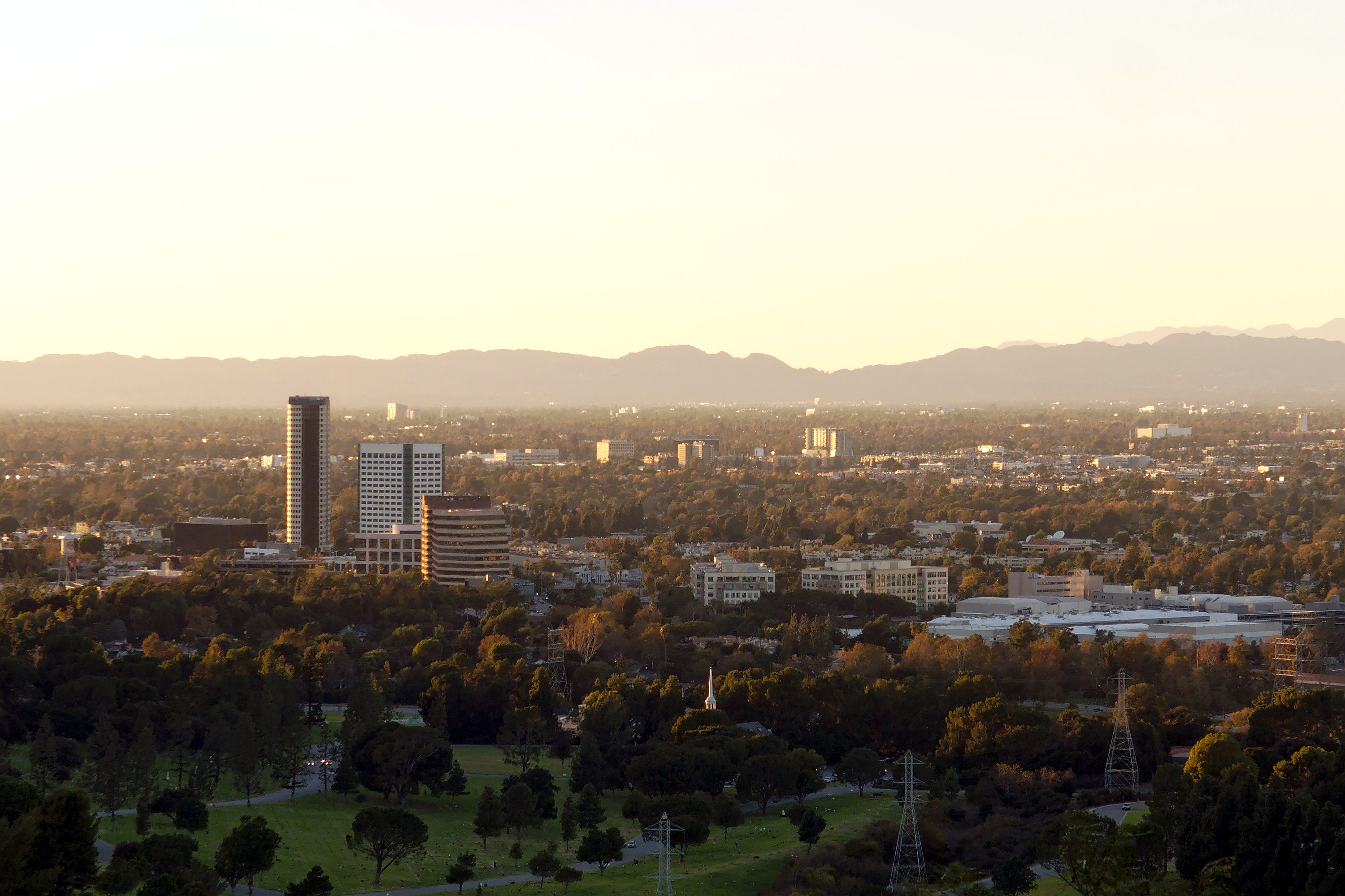
- Looking northwest over Burbank from Griffith Park

- Flag Seal Logo
- Motto: "A city built by People, Pride, and Progress"
- Interactive map of Burbank, California
- Coordinates: 34°10′49″N 118°19′42″W
- Country: United States
- State: California
- County: Los Angeles
- Founded: May 1, 1887; 139 years ago
- Incorporated: July 8, 1911; 115 years ago
- Named for: David Burbank

Government
  - Type: Council–manager
  - Mayor: Tamala Takahashi
  - Vice mayor: Zizette Mullins
  - City council: Konstantine Anthony; Christopher John Rizzotti; Nikki Perez
  - Row Officials: City Officers: * City manager – Justin Hess; * City treasurer – Krystle Ang Palmer; * City clerk – Kimberley Clarke

Area
  - Total: 17.35 sq mi (44.94 km^{2})
  - Land: 17.32 sq mi (44.85 km^{2})
  - Water: 0.035 sq mi (0.09 km^{2}) 0.22%
- Elevation: 607 ft (185 m)

Population (2020)
  - Total: 107,337
  - Rank: 14th in Los Angeles County; 68th in California
  - Density: 6,198.7/sq mi (2,393.34/km^{2})
- Demonym: Burbankian or Burbanker
- Time zone: UTC−8 (Pacific)
  - Summer (DST): UTC−7 (PDT)
- ZIP Codes: 91501–91508, 91510, 91521–91523, 91526
- Area codes: 747/818
- FIPS code: 06-08954
- GNIS feature IDs: 1652677, 2409939
- Website: burbankca.gov

Burbank is a city in the southeastern end of the San Fernando Valley in Los Angeles County, California, United States. Located 7 miles (11 km) northwest of downtown Los Angeles, Burbank had a population of 102,988 as of 2025. The city was named after David Burbank, who established a sheep ranch there in 1867. Burbank consists of two distinct areas: a downtown/foothill section, in the foothills of the Verdugo Mountains, and the flatland section.

Located about six miles northeast of Hollywood, Burbank is a major center of the American media and entertainment industry and is commonly known as the "Media Capital of the World". Warner Bros. Entertainment and The Walt Disney Company are headquartered in Burbank, while Nickelodeon Animation Studio, 20th Century Studios, The Burbank Studios, and other major entertainment companies maintain offices, studios or production facilities there. The CW broadcast television network is also based in the city. Burbank's association with television was reinforced through the recurring joke "beautiful downtown Burbank" popularized by Rowan & Martin's Laugh-In and later referenced on The Tonight Show Starring Johnny Carson, both of which were taped at NBC's former studios. The Hollywood Burbank Airport was the location of Lockheed's Skunk Works, which produced some of the most secret and technologically advanced airplanes, including the U-2 spy planes. Burbank is home to a 456,000-square-foot IKEA store, which was the largest IKEA location in the United States when it opened in 2017.

== History ==
=== Indigenous peoples and Spanish era ===
The area that became Burbank was inhabited by the Tongva people, an indigenous population, for thousands of years before European colonization. In the late 18th century and the early 19th century, Spanish explorers and mission priests arrived in the Los Angeles area. The city of Burbank occupies land that was previously part of two Spanish and Mexican-era colonial land grants: the 36,400-acre (147 km^{2}) Rancho San Rafael, granted to Jose Maria Verdugo by the Spanish Bourbon government in 1784, and the 4,063-acre (16.44 km^{2}) Rancho Providencia created in 1821. This area was the scene of a military skirmish which resulted in the unseating of the Spanish Governor of California, and his replacement by the Mexican leader Pio Pico.

=== Mexican rancho era and early American era ===
New Spain achieved its independence from the Spanish Empire in 1821, and from 1824, Rancho San Rafael existed within the new Mexican Republic.

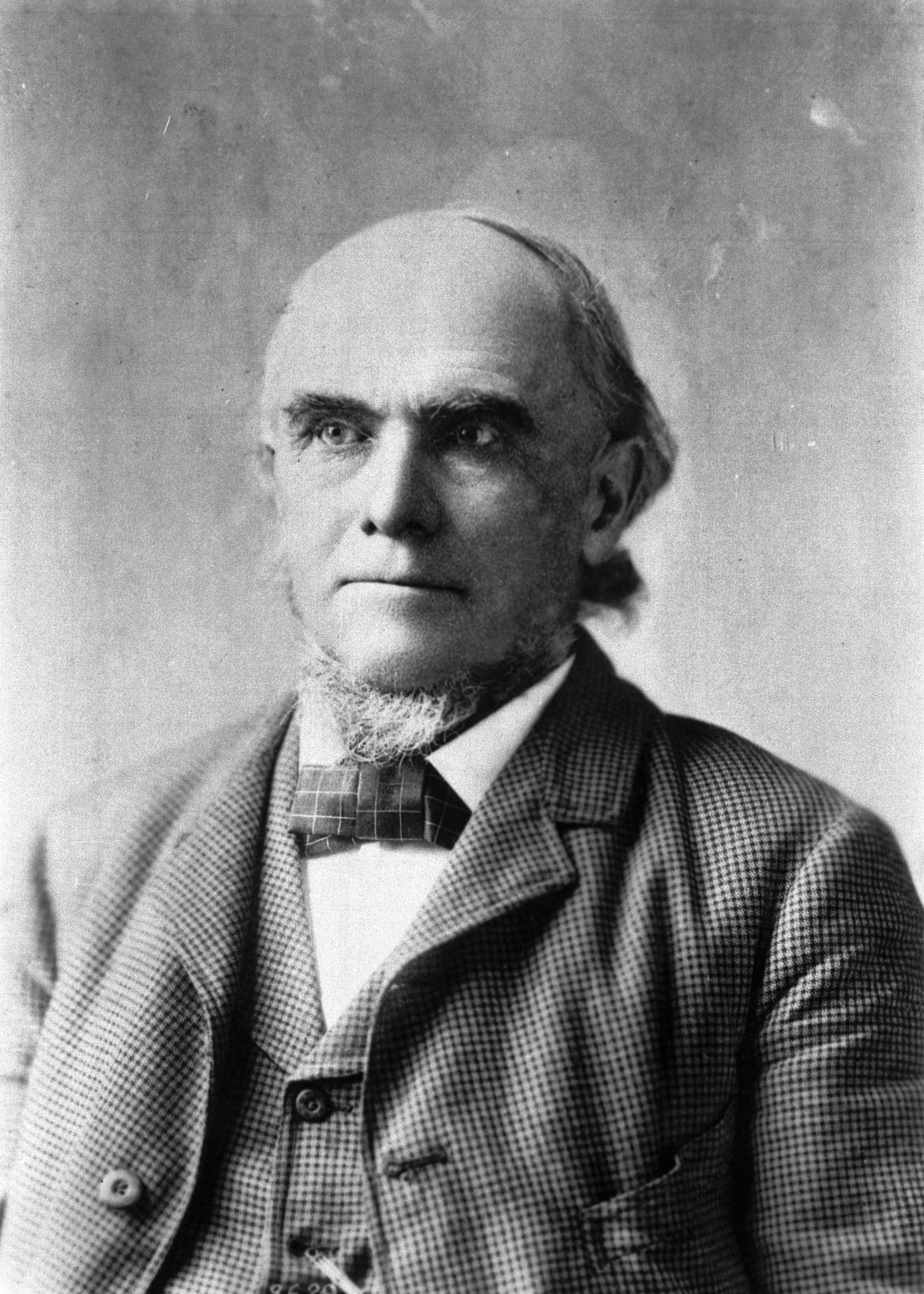
David Burbank

David Burbank purchased over 4,600 acres (19 km^{2}) of the former Verdugo holding and another 4,600 acres (19 km^{2}) of the Rancho Providencia in 1867. Burbank built a ranch house and began to raise sheep and grow wheat on the ranch. By 1876, the San Fernando Valley became the largest wheat-raising area in Los Angeles County. But the droughts of the 1860s and 1870s underlined the need for steady water supplies.

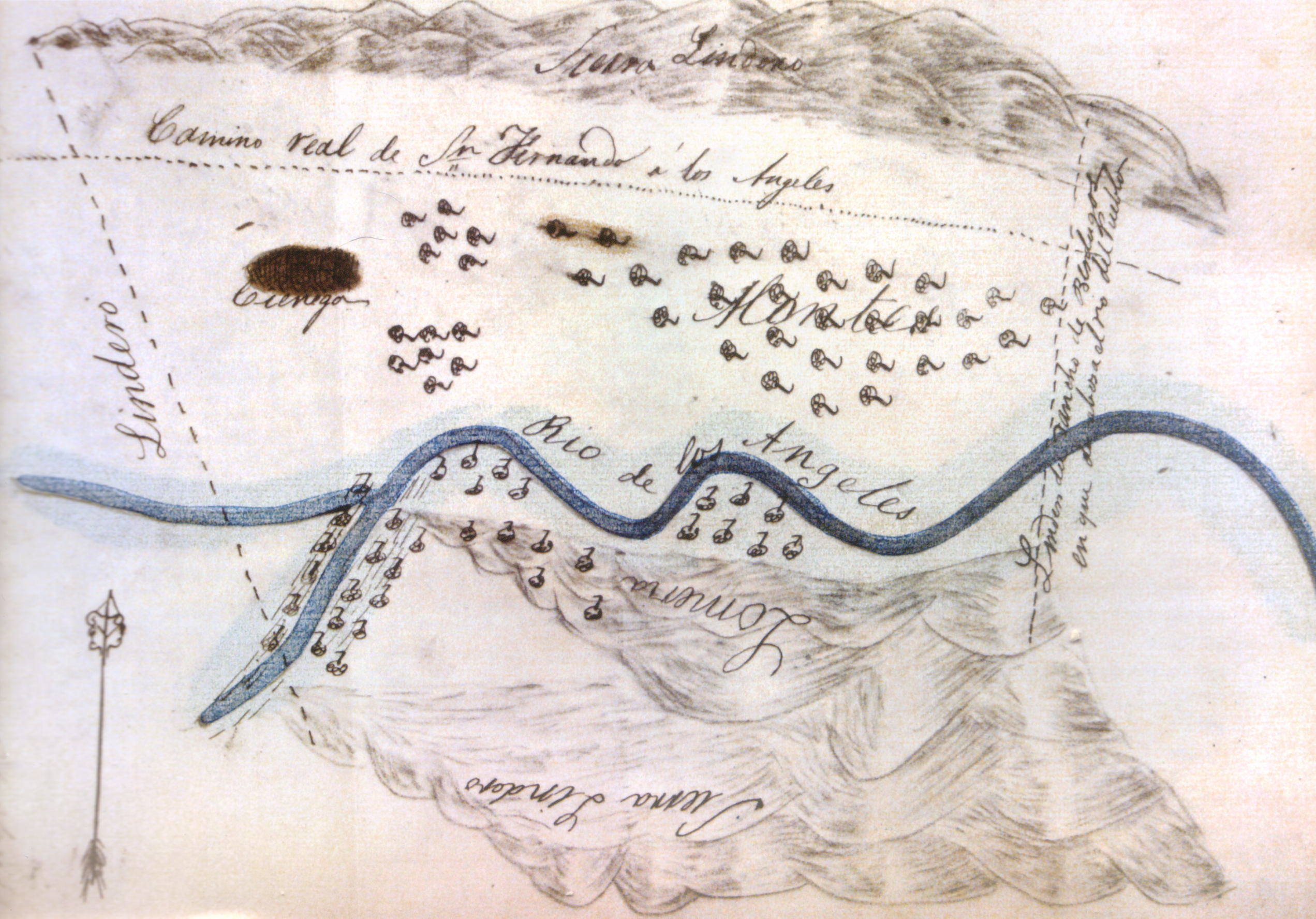
The Jonathan R. Scott tract, forming eastern Burbank along San Fernando Boulevard, called here the "Camino Real"

A professionally trained dentist, Burbank began his career in Waterville, Maine. He joined the great migration westward in the early 1850s and, by 1853 was living in San Francisco. At the time the American Civil War broke out, he was again well established in his profession as a dentist in Pueblo de Los Angeles. In 1867, he purchased Rancho La Providencia from David W. Alexander and Francis Mellus, and he purchased the western portion of the Rancho San Rafael (4,603 acres) from Jonathan R. Scott. Burbank's property reached nearly 9,200 acres (37 km^{2}) at a cost of $9,000. Burbank would not acquire full titles to both properties until after a court decision known as the "Great Partition" was made in 1871 dissolving the Rancho San Rafael. He eventually became known as one of the largest and most successful sheep raisers in southern California, and as a result, he closed his dentistry practice and invested heavily in real estate in Los Angeles.

When the area that became Burbank was settled in the 1870s and 1880s, the streets were aligned along what is now Olive Avenue, the road to the Cahuenga Pass and downtown Los Angeles. These were largely the roads the Native Americans traveled and the early settlers took their produce down to Los Angeles to sell and to buy supplies along these routes.

=== Railroad drives growth (1874–1888) ===
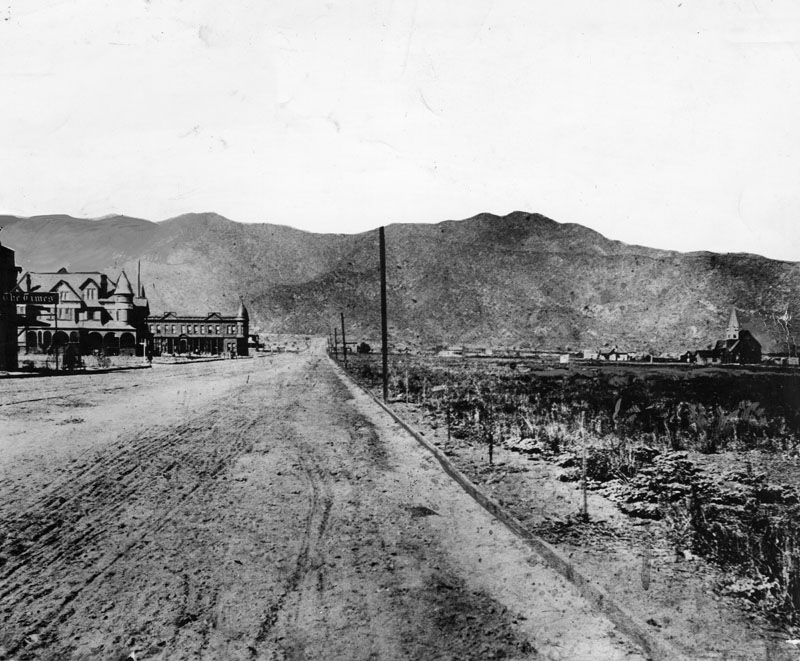
Olive Avenue in Burbank, 1889

Completion of the Southern Pacific Railroad route linking San Francisco and Los Angeles in 1876 marked an important development for the San Fernando Valley, including what would become Burbank. A shrewd businessman, Dr. Burbank sold a 100-foot-wide (30 m), nearly three-mile-long (4.8 km) right-of-way to the railroad. This decision helped shape Burbank's future, positioning it as a vital transportation and commerce hub within the Valley. The first train passed through Burbank on April 5, 1874. A boom created by a rate war between the Santa Fe and Southern Pacific brought people streaming into California. By 1886, a group of speculators had purchased much of Burbank's land holdings for $250,000, possibly due to a severe drought that had made it challenging to sustain his livestock, killing approximately 1,000 sheep due to the lack of water and grass that year.

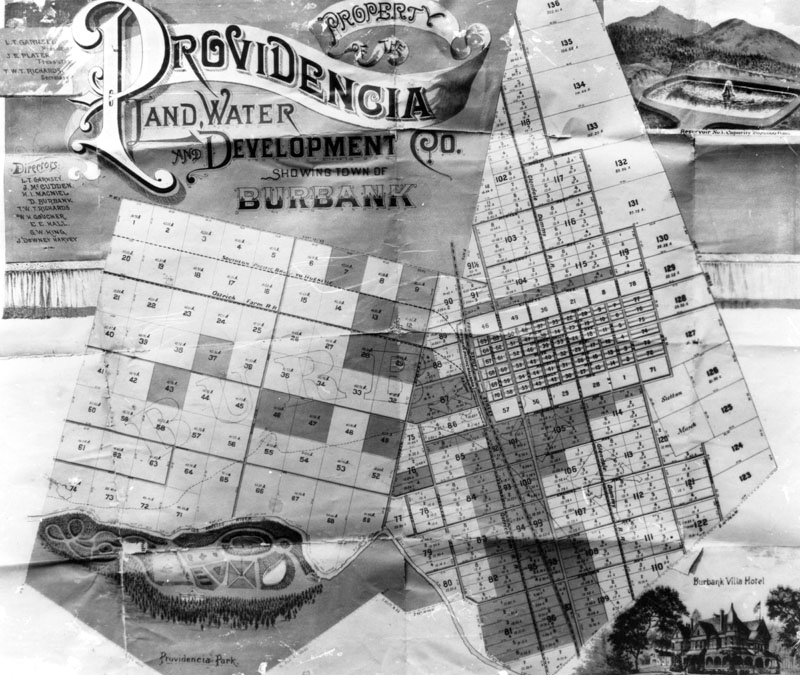
Burbank as envisioned by Providencia Land, Water & Development Co.

The group of speculators who bought the acreage formed the Providencia Land, Water, and Development Company and began developing the land, calling the new town Burbank after its founder, and began offering farm lots on May 1, 1887. The townsite had Burbank Boulevard/Walnut Avenue as the northern boundary, Grandview Avenue as the southern boundary, the edge of the Verdugo Mountains as the eastern boundary, and Clybourn Avenue as the western border. The establishment of a water system in 1887 allowed farmers to irrigate their orchards and provided a stronger base for agricultural development. The original plot of the new townsite of Burbank extended from what is now Burbank Boulevard on the north, to Grandview Avenue in Glendale, California on the south, and from the top of the Verdugo Hills on the east to what is now known as Clybourn Avenue on the west.

At the same time, the arrival of the railroad provided immediate access for the farmers to bring crops to market. Packing houses and warehouses were built along the railroad corridors. The railroads also provided access to the county for tourists and immigrants alike. A Southern Pacific Railroad depot in Burbank was completed in 1887.

The boom lifting real estate values in the Los Angeles area proved to be a speculative frenzy that collapsed abruptly in 1889. Much of the newly created wealthy went broke. Many of the lots in Burbank ended up getting sold for taxes. Vast numbers of people would leave the region before it all ended. The effects of the downturn were felt for several years, as the economy struggled to recover and many businesses closed. However, the region eventually rebounded and continued to grow and develop in the decades that followed.

Before the downturn, Burbank built a hotel in the town in 1887. Burbank also later owned the Burbank Theatre, which opened on November 27, 1893, at a cost of $200,000. Burbank, who came to California in his early thirties, died in 1895 at the age of 73. The theater continued to operate but struggled for many years and by August 1900 had its thirteenth manager. The new manager's name was Oliver Morosco, who was already known as a successful theatrical impresario. He put the theater on the path to prosperity for many years. Though the theater was intended to be an opera house, instead it staged plays and became known nationally. The theatre featured leading actors of the day, such as Fay Bainter and Marjorie Rambeau, until it deteriorated into a burlesque house.

=== Rapid growth and modernization (1900–1956) ===
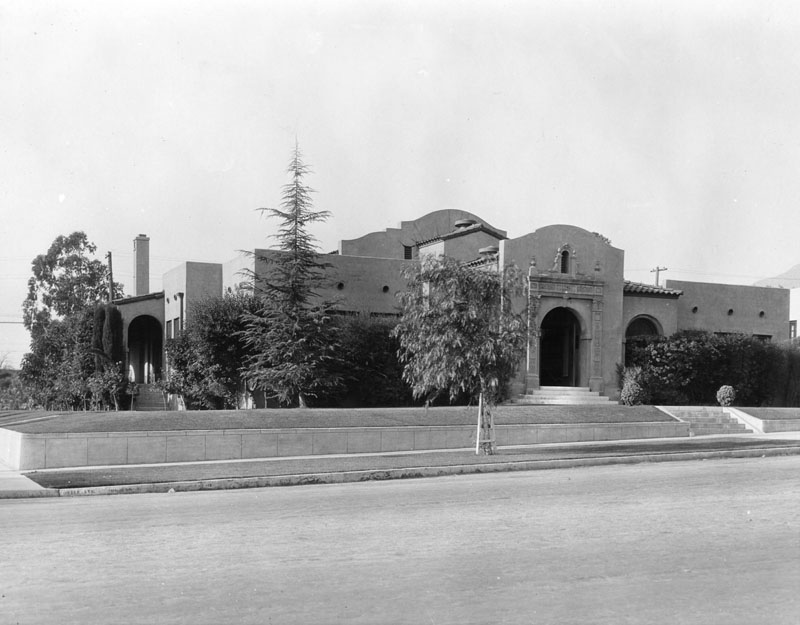
The Burbank Women's Club was built in a Mission Revival style.

In August 1900, Burbank established its first telephone exchange, making it the first in the San Fernando Valley. Within five years, several other telephone exchanges were established in the Valley, and a company known as the San Fernando Valley Home Telephone Company was formed, based in Glendale. This company provided telephone service to the entire Valley, connecting communities and facilitating growth. Home Telephone competed with Tropico, and in 1918 both were taken over by Pacific Telephone Company. At this time, there were an estimated 300 hand-cranked telephones in Burbank. The telephone network helped to connect the sprawling metropolis of Los Angeles and its surrounding areas such as Burbank, making it easier for people to move around and do business.

By 1904, Burbank gained worldwide recognition when the renowned heavyweight boxing champion James J. Jeffries became a significant landowner in the town. Jeffries acquired 107 acres (0.43 km^{2}) of land along Victory Boulevard to establish his ranch. He ventured into cattle farming and exported his livestock to Mexico and South America, becoming one of the pioneering residents to participate in foreign trade. Eventually, he constructed a sizable ranch house and barn near the present-day intersection of Victory Boulevard and Buena Vista Street. Subsequently, the barn was relocated and reconstructed at Knott's Berry Farm in Buena Park, California.

The town's first bank was formed in 1908 when Burbank State Bank opened its doors near the corner of Olive Avenue and San Fernando Blvd. On the first day, the bank collected $30,000 worth of deposits, and at the time the town had a population of 300 residents. In 1911, the bank was dissolved; it would then become the Burbank branch of the Security Trust & Savings Bank.

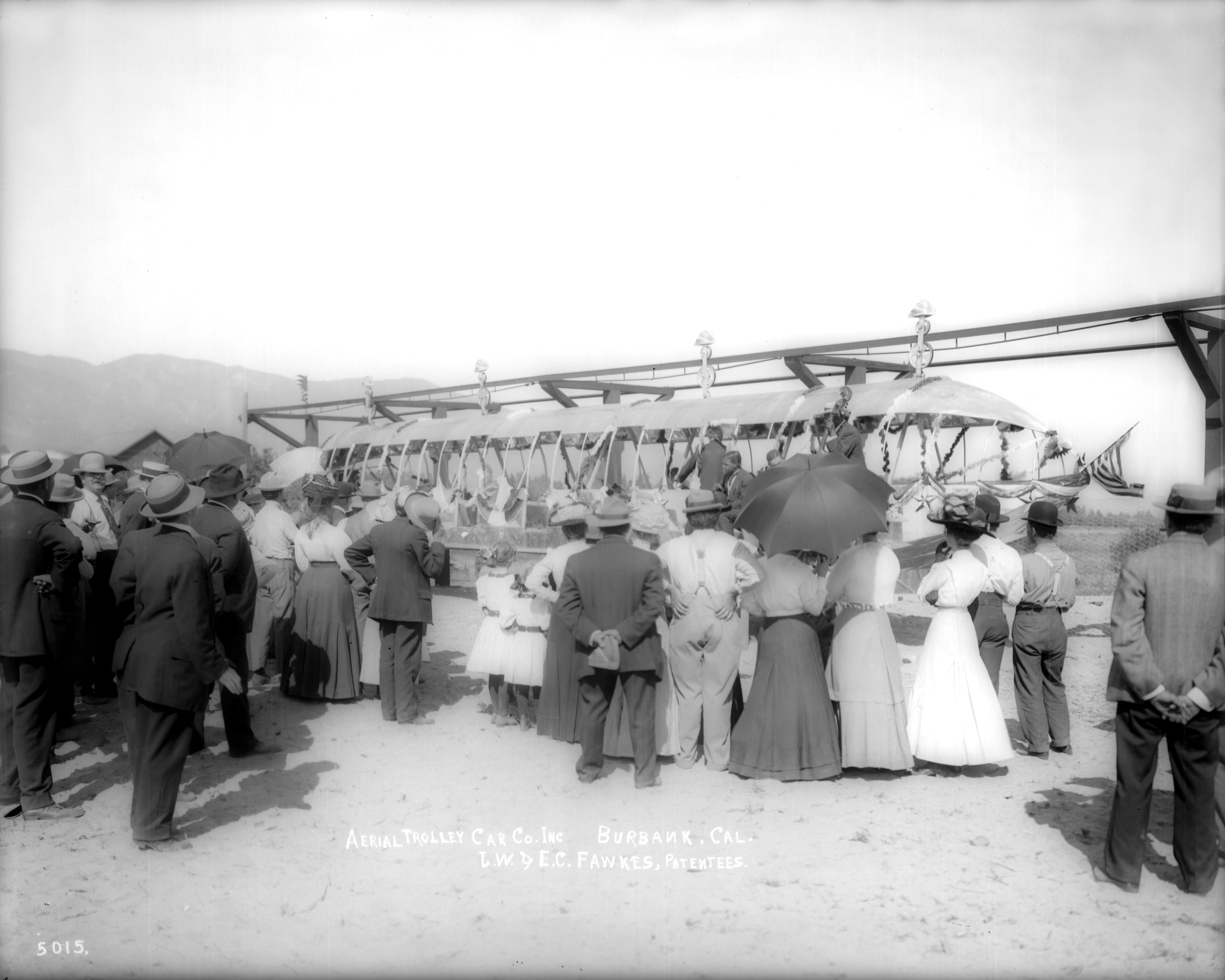
"Fawkes' Folly" being displayed in front of a large crowd

In 1911, wealthy farmer Joseph Fawkes grew apricots and owned a house on West Olive Avenue. He was also fascinated with machinery, and soon began developing what became known as the "Fawkes' Folly" aerial trolley. He and his wife Ellen C. Fawkes secured two patents for the nation's first monorail. The two formed the Aerial Trolley Car Company and set about building a prototype they believed would revolutionize transportation.

Joseph Fawkes called the trolley his Aerial Swallow, a cigar-shaped, suspended monorail driven by a propeller that he promised would carry passengers from Burbank to downtown Los Angeles in 10 minutes. The first open car accommodated about 20 passengers and was suspended from an overhead track and supported by wooden beams. In 1911, the monorail car made its first and only run through his Burbank ranch, with a line between Lake and Flower Streets. The monorail was considered a failure after gliding just a foot or so and falling to pieces. Nobody was injured but Joseph Fawkes' pride was badly hurt as Aerial Swallow became known as "Fawkes' Folly". City officials viewed his test run as a failure and focused on getting a Pacific Electric Streetcar line into Burbank.

Laid out and surveyed with a modern business district surrounded by residential lots, wide boulevards were carved out as the "Los Angeles Express" printed:

Burbank, the town, being built in the midst of the new farming community, has been laid out in such a manner as to make it by and by an unusually pretty town. The streets and avenues are wide and, all have been handsomely graded. All improvements being made would do credit to a city ... Everything done at Burbank has been done right.

The citizens of Burbank had to put up a $48,000 subsidy to get the reluctant Pacific Electric Streetcar officials to agree to extend the line from Glendale to Burbank. The first Red Car rolled into Burbank on September 6, 1911, with a tremendous celebration. That was about two months after the town became a city. The "Burbank Review" newspaper ran a special edition that day advising all local residents that:

On Wednesday, the first electric car running on a regular passenger-carrying schedule left the Pacific Electric station at Sixth and Main streets, Los Angeles, for Burbank at 6:30 a.m. and the first car from Burbank to Los Angeles left at 6:20 a.m. the same day. Upon arrival of this car on its maiden trip, many citizens gave evidence of their great joy by ringing bells and discharging firearms. A big crowd of both men and women boarded the first car and rode to Glendale and there changed to a second car coming from Los Angeles and rode home again. Every face was an expression of happiness and satisfaction.

The Burbank Line was completed through to Cypress Avenue in Burbank, and by mid-1925 this line was extended about a mile further along Glenoaks Boulevard to Eton Drive. A small wooden station was erected in Burbank in 1911 at Orange Grove Avenue with a small storage yard in its rear. This depot was destroyed by fire in 1942 and in 1947 a small passenger shelter was constructed.

On May 26, 1942, the California State Railroad Commission proposed an extension of the Burbank Line to the Lockheed plant. The proposal called for a double-track line from Arden Junction along Glenoaks to San Fernando Boulevard and Empire Way, just northeast of Lockheed's main facility. But this extension never materialized and the commission moved on to other projects in the San Fernando Valley. The Red Car line in Burbank was abandoned and the tracks removed in 1956.

In 1923, Burbank transitioned from a marshal's office to a police department. The early department consisted of only a handful of officers who were responsible for maintaining law and order in a rapidly growing community. The first police chief was George Cole, who later became a U.S. Treasury prohibition officer. Through the decades, the department has grown and evolved, adapting to the changing needs of the city. Today, the Burbank Police Department is a well-respected agency, known for its professionalism and commitment to serving the community. The department has a diverse range of specialized units, including a SWAT team, K-9 unit, air support, and a detective bureau.

In 1928, Burbank was one of the first 13 cities to join the Metropolitan Water District of Southern California, one of the largest suppliers of water in the world. This contrasted with other San Fernando Valley communities that obtained water through political annexation to Los Angeles. By 1937, the first power from Hoover Dam was distributed over Burbank's own electricity lines. The city purchases about 55% of its water from the MWD.

Burbank's industrial growth continued into the postwar period, driven in large part by the expansion of Lockheed Aircraft Corporation. In 1956, Lockheed embarked on a $92 million expansion program in Burbank, reflecting the continuing importance of the aerospace industry to the city's economy.

=== City of Burbank ===
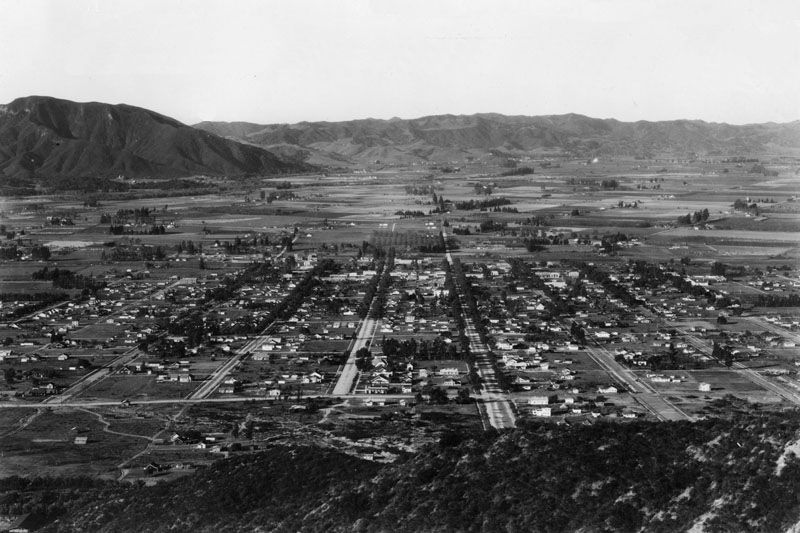
Burbank, 1922

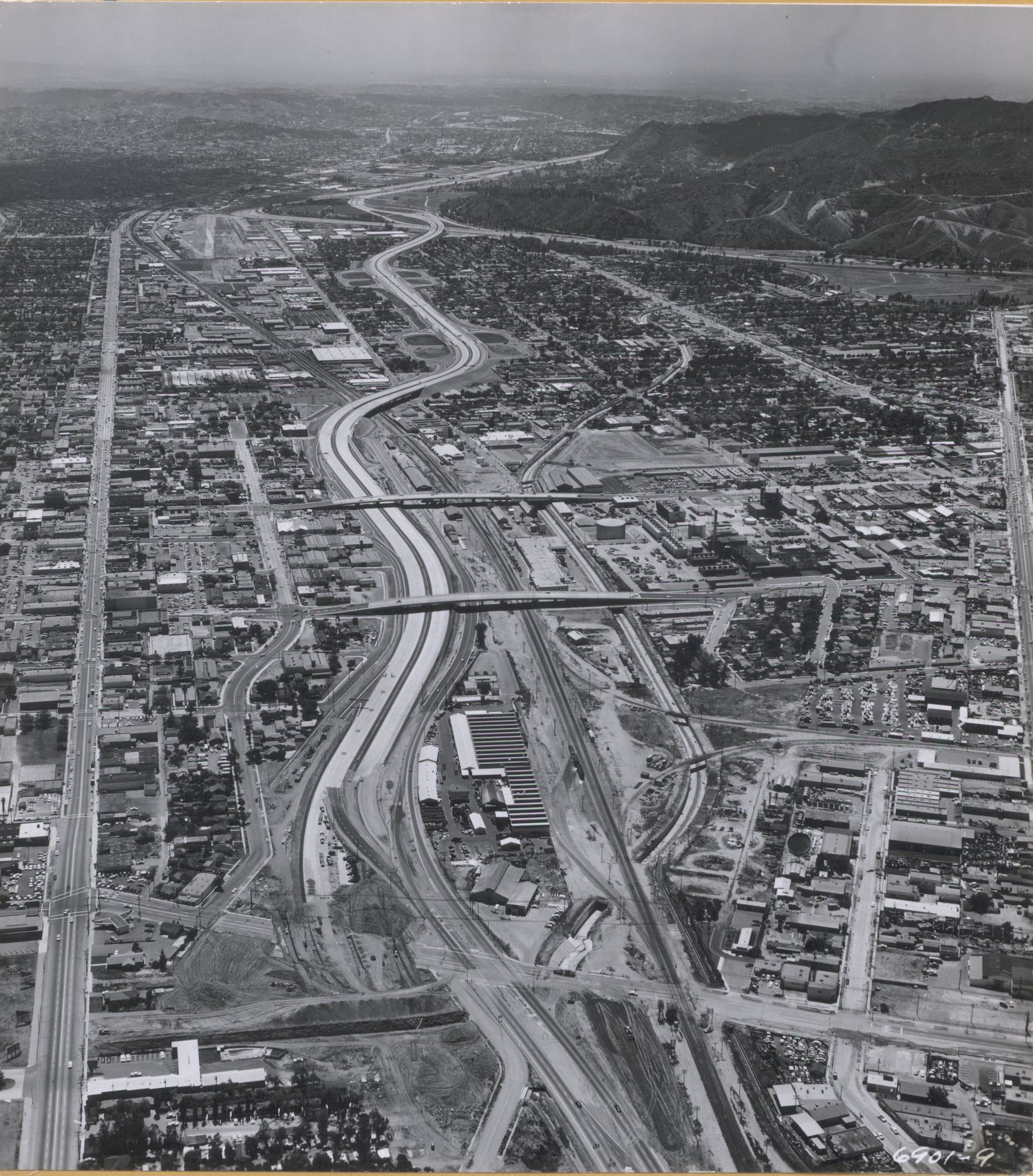
Golden State Freeway/Interstate 5 under construction through Burbank, 1959

The town grew steadily, weathering the drought and depression that hit Los Angeles in the 1890s and in 20 years, the community had a bank, newspaper, high school and a thriving business district with a hardware store, livery stable, dry goods store, general store, and bicycle repair shop. The city's first newspaper, Burbank Review, was established in 1906.

The populace petitioned the State Legislature to incorporate as a city on July 8, 1911, with businessman Thomas Story as the mayor. Voters approved incorporation by a vote of 81 to 51. At the time, the Board of Trustees governed the community which numbered 500 residents. With the action of the Legislature, Burbank thus became the first independent city in the San Fernando Valley.

The establishment of Burbank as a city was a crucial milestone in the area's progress, triggering a fresh phase of growth and advancement. This cityhood meant that Burbank gained the ability to govern itself, making decisions independently regarding its development and expansion. It also granted the city greater authority over its valuable resources, such as land, water, and other assets. With this newfound control, Burbank could shape its own future and manage its local affairs more effectively.

The first city seal adopted by Burbank featured a cantaloupe, which was a crop that helped save the town's life when the land boom collapsed. In 1931, the original city seal was replaced and in 1978 the modern seal was adopted. The new seal shows City Hall beneath a banner. An airplane symbolizes the city's aircraft industry, the strip of film and stage light represent motion picture production. The bottom portion depicts the sun rising over the Verdugo Mountains.

In 1915, major sections of the Valley were annexed, helping Los Angeles to more than double its size that year. But Burbank was among a handful of towns with their own water wells and remained independent. By 1916, Burbank had 1,500 residents. In 1922, the Burbank Chamber of Commerce was organized. In 1923, the United States Postal Service reclassified the city from the rural village mail delivery to city postal delivery service. Burbank's population had grown significantly, from less than 500 people in 1908 to over 3,000 citizens. The city's business district grew on the west side of San Fernando Blvd. and stretched from Verdugo to Cypress avenues, and on the east side to Palm Avenue. In 1927, five miles (8 km) of paved streets had increased to 125 miles (201 km).

The Wall Street Crash of 1929 set off a period of hardship for Burbank where business and residential growth paused. The effects of the Depression also caused tight credit conditions and halted home building throughout the area, including the city's Magnolia Park development. Around this time, major employers began to cut payrolls and some plants closed their doors.

The Burbank City Council responded by slashing 10% of the wages of city workers. Money was put into an Employee Relief Department to help the unemployed. Local civic and religious groups sprang into action and contributed with food as homeless camps began to form along the city's Southern Pacific railroad tracks. Hundreds began to participate in self-help cooperatives, trading skills such as barbering, tailoring, plumbing or carpentry, for food and other services.

By 1930, First National Studios, Andrew Jergens Company, The Lockheed Company, McNeill and Libby Canning Company, the Moreland Company, and Northrop Aircraft Corporation opened facilities in Burbank, and the population jumped to 16,662.

In the 1930s, Burbank and Glendale prevented the Civilian Conservation Corps from stationing African American workers in a local park, citing sundown town ordinances that both cities had adopted. Sundown towns were municipalities or neighborhoods that practiced racial segregation by excluding non-white individuals, especially African Americans, from living within the city limits after sunset.

Following a San Fernando Valley land bust during the Depression, real estate began to bounce back in the mid-1930s. In Burbank, a 100-home construction project began in 1934. By 1936, property values in the city exceeded pre-Depression levels. By 1950, the population had reached 78,577. From 1967 to 1989, a six-block stretch of San Fernando Boulevard was pedestrianized as the "Golden Mall". It was reopened to traffic in 1989.

=== Early manufacturing ===
In 1887, the Burbank Furniture Manufacturing Company was the town's first factory. In 1917, the arrival of the Moreland Motor Truck Company changed the town and resulted in growing a manufacturing and industrial workforce. Within a few years, Moreland trucks were seen bearing the label, "Made in Burbank". Watt Moreland, its owner, had relocated his plant to Burbank from Los Angeles. He selected 25 acres (100,000 m^{2}) at San Fernando Blvd. and Alameda Avenue. Moreland invested $1 million in the factory and machinery and employed 500 people. It was the largest truck maker west of the Mississippi.

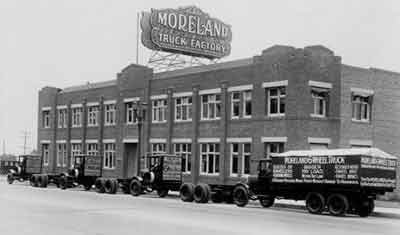
The Moreland Motor Truck Company in Burbank

Within the next several decades, factories would dot the area landscape. What had mainly been an agricultural and ranching area would get replaced with a variety of manufacturing industries. Moreland operated from 1917 to 1937. Aerospace supplier Menasco Manufacturing Company would later purchase the property. Menasco's Burbank landing gear factory closed in 1994 due to slow commercial and military orders, affecting 310 people. Within months of Moreland's arrival, Community Manufacturing Company, a $3 million tractor company, arrived in Burbank.

In 1920, the Andrew Jergens Company factory opened at Verdugo Avenue near the railroad tracks in Burbank. Andrew Jergens Jr.—aided by his father, Cincinnati businessman Andrew Jergens Sr. and business partners Frank Adams and Morris Spazier—had purchased the site and built a single-story building. They began with a single product, coconut oil soap, but would later make face creams, lotions, liquid soaps, and deodorants. In 1931, despite the Depression, the Jergens company expanded, building new offices and shipping department facilities. In 1939, the Burbank corporation merged with the Cincinnati company of Andrew Jergens Sr. becoming known as the Andrew Jergens Company of Ohio. The Burbank plant closed in 1992, affecting nearly 90 employees.

=== Aviation ===
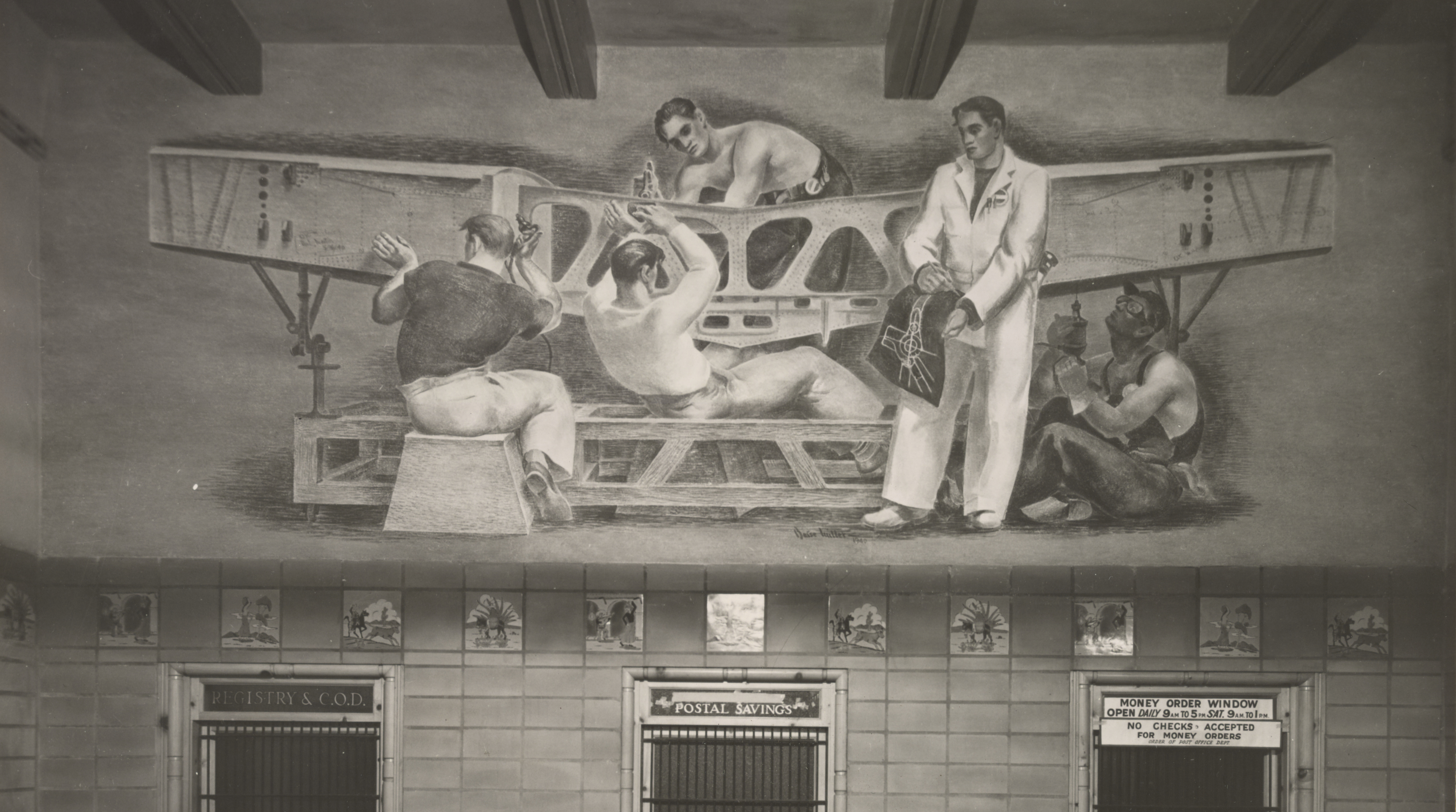
People of Burbank (1940), mural at the Downtown Burbank Post Office

The establishment of the aircraft industry and a major airport in Burbank during the 1930s set the stage for major growth and development, which was to continue at an accelerated pace into World War II and well into the postwar era. Brothers Allan Loughead and Malcolm Loughead, founders of the Lockheed Aircraft Company, opened a Burbank manufacturing plant in 1928 and, a year later, aviation designer Jack Northrop built his Flying Wing airplane in his own plant nearby.

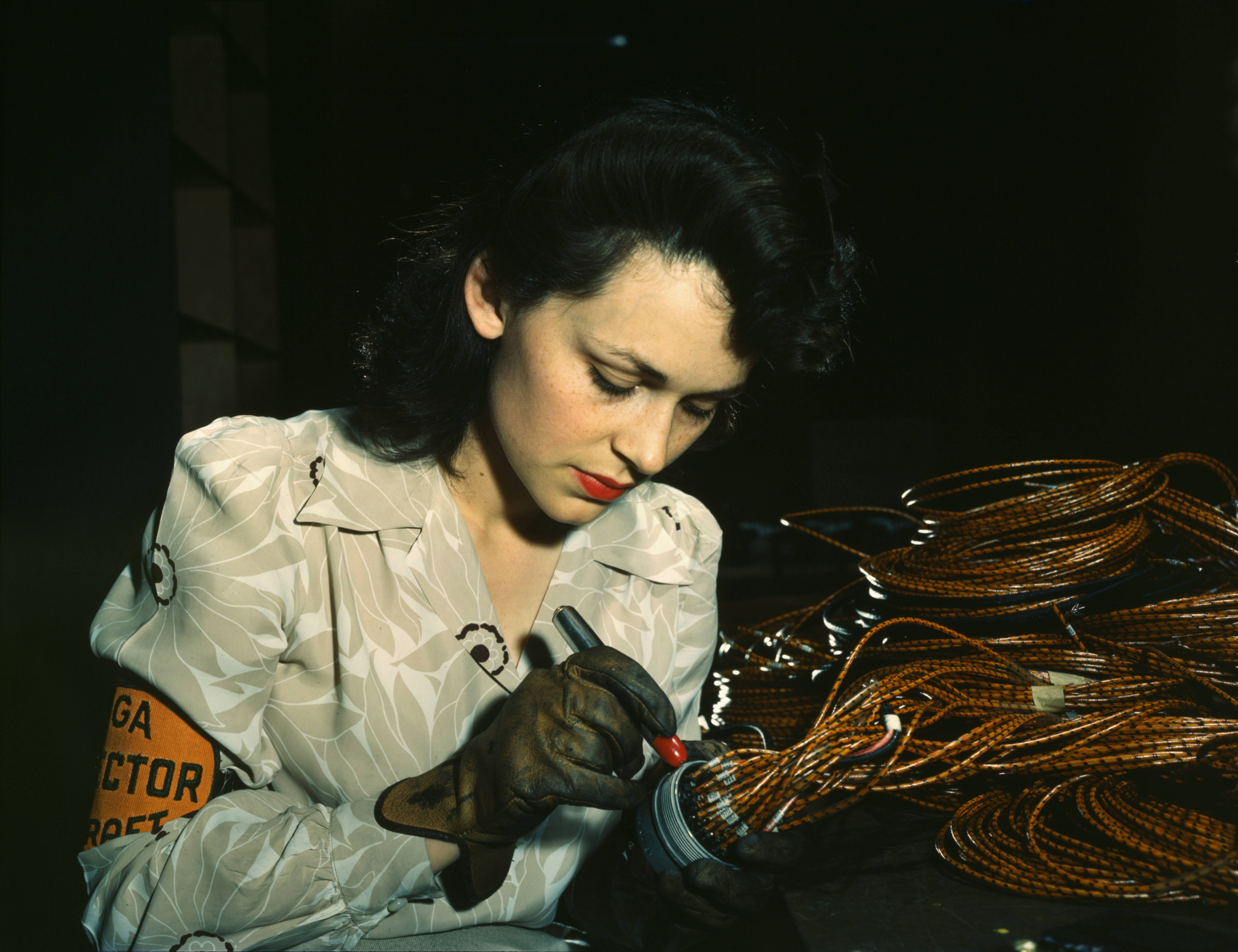
Woman aircraft inspector checking electrical assemblies, Vega Aircraft Corporation, Burbank (June 1942)

Dedicated on Memorial Day Weekend (May 30 – June 1), 1930, the United Airport was the largest commercial airport in the Los Angeles area until it was eclipsed in 1946 by the Los Angeles Municipal Airport (now Los Angeles International Airport) in Westchester when that facility (the former Mines Field) commenced commercial operations. Amelia Earhart, Wiley Post and Howard Hughes were among the notable aviation pioneers to pilot aircraft in and out of the original Union Air Terminal. By 1935, Union Air Terminal in Burbank ranked as the third-largest air terminal in the nation, with 46 airliners flying out of it daily. The airport served 9,895 passengers in 1931 and 98,485 passengers in 1936.

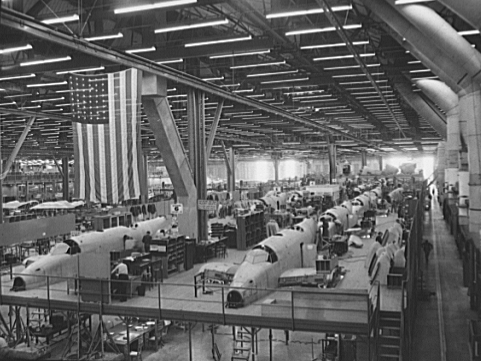
Vega Aircraft plant in Burbank (June 1942)

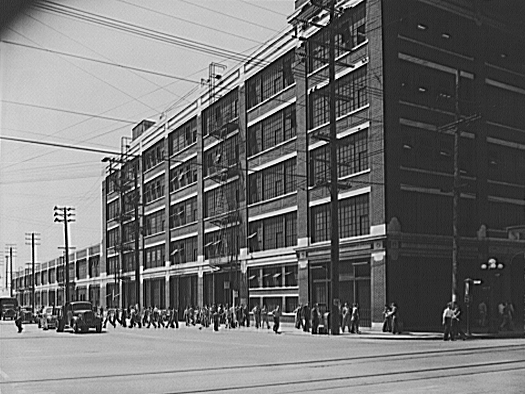
Lockheed Aircraft Corporation in Burbank, 1945

In 1931, Lockheed was then part of Detroit Aircraft Corp., which went into bankruptcy with its Lockheed unit. A year later, a group of investors acquired assets of the Lockheed company. The new owners staked their limited funds to develop an all-metal, twin-engine transport, the Model 10 Electra. It first flew in 1934 and quickly gained worldwide notice.

A brochure celebrating Burbank's 50th anniversary as a city touted Lockheed payroll having "nearly 1,200" by the end of 1936. The aircraft company's hiring contributed to what was a favorable employment environment at the time.

Moreland's truck plant was later used by Lockheed's Vega Aircraft Corporation, which made what was widely known as "the explorer's aircraft". Amelia Earhart flew one across the Atlantic Ocean. In 1936, Lockheed officially took over Vega Aircraft in Burbank.

During World War II, the entire area of Lockheed's Vega factory was camouflaged to fool an enemy reconnaissance effort. The factory was hidden beneath a rural neighborhood scenes painted on canvas. Hundreds of fake trees and shrubs were positioned to give the entire area a three-dimensional appearance. The fake trees and shrubs were created to provide a leafy texture. Air ducts disguised as fire hydrants made it possible for the Lockheed-Vega employees to continue working underneath the huge camouflage umbrella designed to conceal their factory.

The growth of companies such as Lockheed, and the burgeoning entertainment industry drew more people to the area, and Burbank's population doubled between 1930 and 1940 to 34,337. Burbank saw its greatest growth during World War II due to Lockheed's presence, employing men and women producing aircraft such as the Lockheed Hudson, Lockheed P-38 Lightning, Lockheed PV-1 Ventura, Boeing B-17 Flying Fortress, and America's first jet fighter, the Lockheed P-80 Shooting Star. Lockheed later created the U2, SR-71 Blackbird and the F-117 Nighthawk at its Burbank-based "Skunk Works". The name came from a secret, ill-smelling backwoods distillery called "Skonk Works" in cartoonist Al Capp's Li'l Abner comic strip.

Dozens of hamburger stands, restaurants, and shops appeared around Lockheed to accommodate the employees. Some of the restaurants operated 24 hours a day. At one time, Lockheed paid utility rates representing 25% of the city's total utilities revenue, making Lockheed the city's cash cow. When Lockheed left, the economic loss was huge. At its height during World War II, the Lockheed facility employed up to 98,000 people. Between the Lockheed and Vega plants, some 7,700,000 square feet (720,000 m^{2}) of manufacturing space was located in Burbank at the peak in 1943. Burbank's growth did not slow as war production ceased, and over 7,000 new residents created a postwar real estate boom. Real estate values soared as housing tracts appeared in the Magnolia Park area of Burbank between 1945 and 1950. More than 62% of the city's housing stock was built before 1970.

Following World War II, homeless veterans lived in tent camps in Burbank, in Big Tujunga Canyon and at a decommissioned National Guard base in Griffith Park. The government also set up trailer camps at Hollywood Way and Winona Avenue in Burbank and in nearby Sun Valley. But new homes were built, the economy improved, and the military presence in Burbank continued to expand. Lockheed employees numbered 66,500 and expanded from aircraft to include spacecraft, missiles, electronics and shipbuilding.

Burbank was also where the prototypes for the JetStar corporate transport and Lockheed C-130 Hercules cargo carrier first took flight, and where the concepts for the Lockheed L-1011 TriStar jetliner and Lockheed F-117 Nighthawk stealth fighter were developed.

Lockheed's presence in Burbank attracted dozens of firms making aircraft parts. One of them was Weber Aircraft Corporation, an aircraft interior manufacturer situated adjacent to Lockheed at the edge of the airport. Throughout the 1950s and into the late 1960s, Weber Aircraft became a leading supplier of seats for a variety of aircraft, including the Boeing 707, the Douglas DC-8, and the Lockheed L-1011. In 1988, Weber closed its Burbank manufacturing plant, which then employed 1,000 people. Weber produced seats, galleys, lavatories and other equipment for commercial and military aircraft. Weber had been in Burbank for 36 years.

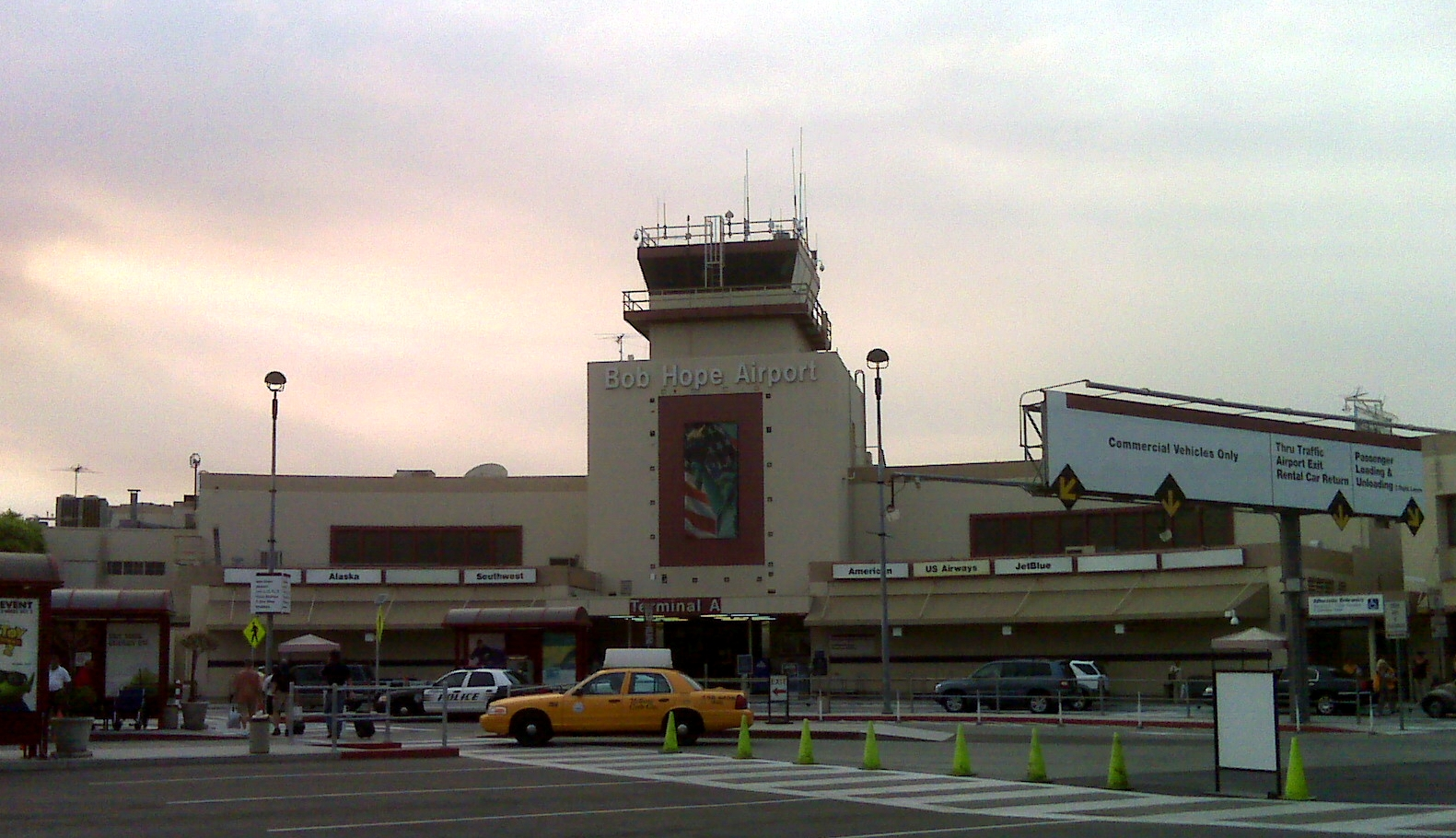
Front of Bob Hope Airport, 2009

In 1987, Burbank's airport became the first to require flight carriers to fly quieter "Stage 3" jets. Passenger traffic has grown substantially in recent decades, from about 4.5 million passengers in 2010 to 6.5 million in 2024 and 6.2 million in 2025. The airport also is a major facility for FedEx and UPS, handling 72 million pounds of cargo in 2025.

=== Entertainment industry ===
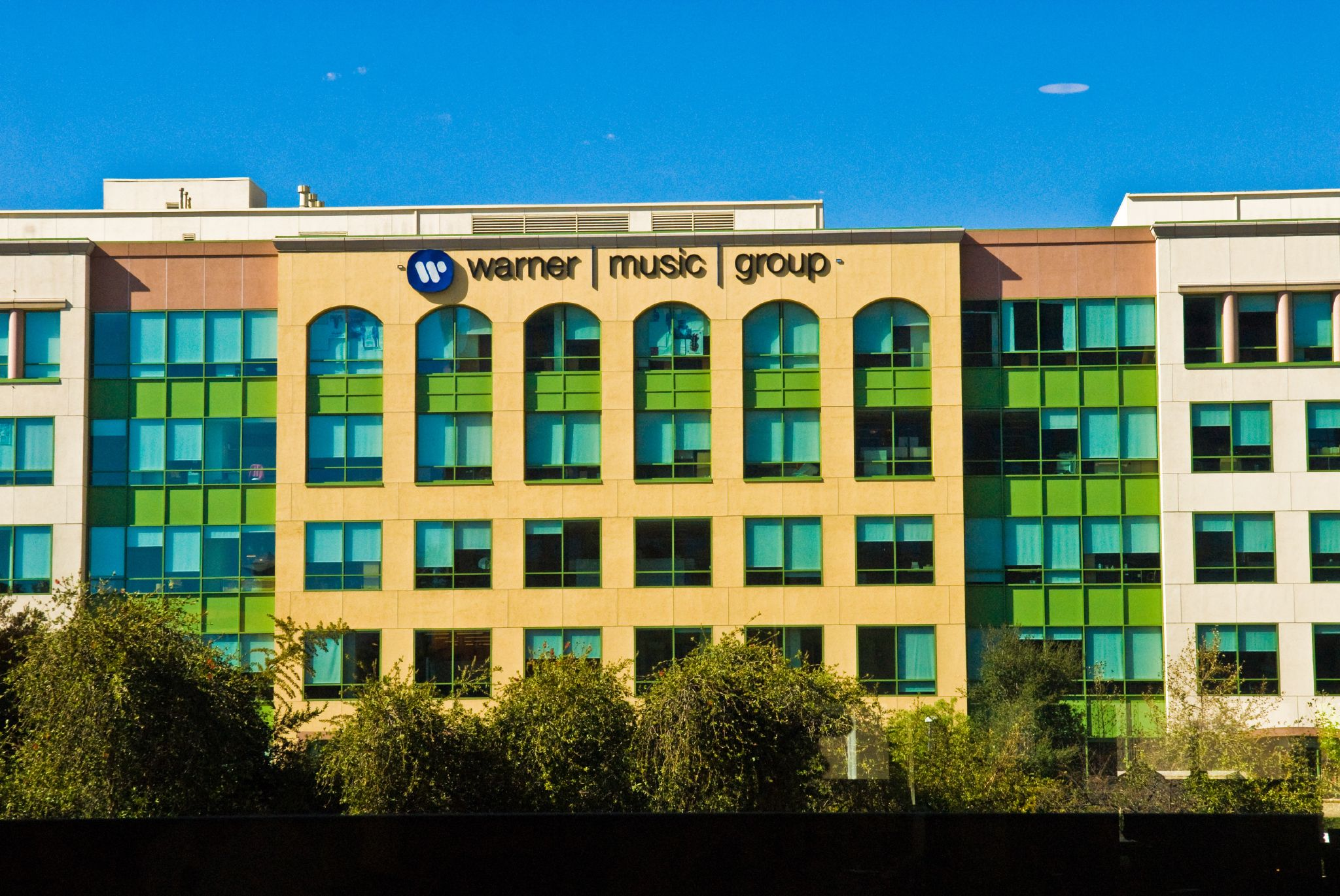
Warner Music Group offices in Burbank

The motion picture business arrived in Burbank in the 1920s. In 1926, First National Pictures bought a 78-acre (320,000 m^{2}) site on Olive Avenue near Dark Canyon. The property included a 40-acre (160,000 m^{2}) hog ranch and the original David Burbank house, both owned by rancher Stephen A. Martin.

In 1928, First National was taken over by a company founded by the four Warner Brothers. Notably, First National had produced and released many of the early "talkie" films of the late 1920s. By 1929, Warner Bros.-First National Pictures was dissolved and the First National name was retired. However, Warner Bros. continued to operate on the site as a standalone studio. In addition to film and television production, Burbank also played a role in the recording industry. Major studios in the city, particularly Warner Brothers, were used for music scoring and recording sessions by prominent artists during the mid-20th century, including Frank Sinatra, Elvis Presley, and the Beach Boys.

Columbia Pictures purchased property in Burbank as a ranch facility, used primarily for outdoor shooting. Walt Disney's company, which had outgrown its Hollywood quarters after the success of Snow White and the Seven Dwarfs, bought 51 acres (210,000 m^{2}) in Burbank. Disney's million-dollar studio, designed by Kem Weber, was completed in 1939 on Buena Vista Street. Disney originally wanted to build "Mickey Mouse Park," as he first called it, next to the Burbank studio. But his aides finally convinced him that the space was too small, and there was opposition from the Burbank City Council. One council member told Disney: "We don't want the carny atmosphere in Burbank." Disney later built his successful Disneyland in Anaheim. More recently, the Burbank City Council signaled plans to create a local film commission in an effort to cut red tape and further support the city's signature industry.

==== Wartime effort ====
During World War II, many of the movie studios in Burbank were used for war-related production, including civil defense-related films, and the city experienced a population boom as a result of the increased job opportunities. From Disney Studios alone, more than 70 hours of film was produced during the wartime effort. This included films that were used to boost morale on the home front and others that were used to educate and inform the public about the war. Burbank, which was previously known primarily as a center of the entertainment industry, became a major player in the war effort and a thriving community as a result. As the war came to an end, the movie studios in Burbank returned to their primary function of producing entertainment films, but the city had permanently changed as a result of its wartime experience.

==== Labor strife ====
Burbank saw its first real civil strife as the culmination of a six-month labor dispute between the set decorators union and the studios resulted in the Battle of Burbank on October 5, 1945, a confrontation that led to the largest wave of strikes in American history. For six months, the union had been negotiating for better pay and working conditions, but the studios refused to budge. Frustrated and desperate, the set decorators decided to take action. The studios responded by hiring non-union workers to replace the striking decorators, but the union was not about to back down. They organized picket lines and rallies, drawing support from other unions in the area. The studios, in turn, called in police and private security to break up the protests. Streets were filled with striking workers, non-union replacements, and security personnel, all engaged in a violent confrontation. Cars were overturned, windows were smashed, and tear gas was used to disperse the crowds. In the end, studios were forced to negotiate with the union, and the decorators ultimately won their demands for better pay and working conditions.

==== Hub of Hollywood ====
By the 1960s and 1970s, more of the Hollywood entertainment industry was relocating to Burbank. NBC moved its west coast headquarters to a new location at Olive and Alameda avenues. The Burbank studio was purchased in 1951, and NBC arrived in 1952 from its former location at Sunset and Vine in Hollywood. Although NBC promoted its Hollywood image for most of its West Coast telecasts (such as Ed McMahon's introduction to The Tonight Show Starring Johnny Carson: "from Hollywood"), comedians Dan Rowan and Dick Martin began mentioning "beautiful downtown Burbank" on Laugh-in in the 1960s. By 1962, NBC's multimillion-dollar, state-of-the-art complex was completed.

One of the biggest productions to come out of the Burbank studios during this time was the hit television series Batman. The show, which aired from 1966 to 1968, was filmed partly on the Warner Bros. lot in Burbank and was a huge success, both critically and commercially. It was instrumental in launching other superhero shows and movies, and its popularity helped to establish the studio as a major player in the television industry. As the 1970s came to a close, the Burbank studios had firmly established themselves as a major player in the industry.

==== Studio Corridor ====
Warner Bros., NBC, Disney and Columbia TriStar Home Video (now Sony Pictures Home Entertainment) all ended up located very close to each other along the southern edge of Burbank (and not far from Universal City to the southwest), an area now known as the Media District, Media Center District or simply Media Center. In the early 1990s, Burbank imposed growth restrictions in the Media District. Since then, to house its growing workforce, Disney has focused on developing the site of the former Grand Central Airport in the nearby city of Glendale.

Rumors surfaced of NBC leaving Burbank after its parent company General Electric Corporation acquired Universal Studios and renamed the merged division NBC Universal. Since the deal, NBC has been relocating key operations to the Universal property located in Universal City. In 2007, NBC Universal management informed employees that the company planned to sell much of the Burbank complex. NBC Universal would relocate its television and cable operations to the Universal City complex. When Conan O'Brien took over hosting The Tonight Show from Carson's successor Jay Leno in 2009, he hosted the show from Universal City. However, O'Brien's hosting role lasted only 7 months, and Leno, who launched a failed primetime 10pm show in fall 2009, was asked to resume his Tonight Show role after O'Brien controversially left NBC. The show returned to the NBC Burbank lot and had been expected to remain there until at least 2018. However, in April 2013 NBC confirmed plans for The Tonight Show to return to New York after 42 years in Burbank, with comic Jimmy Fallon replacing Leno as host. The change became effective in February 2014.

The relocation plans changed following Comcast Corp.'s $30 billion acquisition of NBC Universal in January 2011. NBC Universal announced in January 2012 it would relocate the NBC Network, Telemundo's L.A. Bureau, as well as local stations KNBC and KVEA to the former Technicolor building located on the lower lot of Universal Studios in Universal City. The former NBC Studios were renamed The Burbank Studios.

In 2019, Conan O'Brien moved his TBS talk show, Conan, to Stage 15 on the Warner Bros. studios lot in Burbank, where it continued to tape until 2021 when the show ended. Stage 15, constructed in the late 1920s, was used to shoot films such as Calamity Jane (1953), Blazing Saddles (1974), A Star Is Born (1976) and Ghostbusters (1984).

In the early 1990s, Burbank tried unsuccessfully to lure Sony Pictures Entertainment, the Columbia and TriStar studios owner based in Culver City, and 20th Century Fox, which had threatened to move from its West Los Angeles lot unless the city granted permission to upgrade its facility. Fox stayed after getting Los Angeles city approval on its $200 million expansion plan. In 1999, the city managed to gain Cartoon Network Studios which took up residence in an old commercial bakery building located on North 3rd St. when it separated its production operations from Warner Bros. Animation in Sherman Oaks.

=== Cinema history ===
Hundreds of major feature films have been filmed in the studios in Burbank including Casablanca (1942), starring Humphrey Bogart. The movie began production a few months after the Japanese bombing of Pearl Harbor. Due to World War II, location shooting was restricted and filming near airports was banned. As a result, Casablanca shot most of its major scenes on Stage 1 at the Warner Bros. Burbank Studios, including the film's airport scene. It featured a foggy Moroccan runway created on the stage where Bogart's character does not fly away with Ingrid Bergman. Bonnie and Clyde (1967) was also filmed at the Warner Bros. Burbank Studios.

The Gary Cooper film High Noon (1952) was shot on a western street at the Warner Brothers "Ranch", then known as the Columbia Ranch. The ranch facility is situated less than a mile north of Warner's main lot in Burbank. 3:10 to Yuma (1957) was also filmed on the old Columbia Ranch, and much of the outdoor filming for the Three Stooges took place at Columbia Ranch, including most of the chase scenes. In 1993, Warner Bros. bulldozed the Burbank-based sets used to film High Noon and Lee Marvin's Oscar-winning Western comedy Cat Ballou (1965), as well as several other features and television shows. A $500-million redevelopment of the Warner Bros. Ranch Lot is currently underway, which will add new offices and soundstages to the historic production facility.

While filming Apollo 13 (1995) and Coach Carter (2005), the producers shot scenes at Burbank's Safari Inn Motel. True Romance (1993) also filmed on location at the motel. Back to the Future (1985) shot extensively on the Universal Studios backlot but also filmed band audition scenes at the McCambridge Park Rec Center, and Doc's Garage on Victory Place. San Fernando Boulevard doubled for San Diego in The Lost World: Jurassic Park (1997) while much of Christopher Nolan's Memento was shot in and around Burbank with scenes on Burbank Blvd., at the Blue Room (a local bar also featured in the 1994 Michael Mann feature Heat), the tattoo parlor, as well as the character Natalie's home.

The city's indoor shopping mall, Burbank Town Center, is often used as a backdrop for shooting films, television series and commercials. Over the years, it was the site for scenes in Bad News Bears (2005) to location shooting for Cold Case, Gilmore Girls, ER, and Desperate Housewives. The ABC show Desperate Housewives also frequently used the Magnolia Park area for show scenes, along with the city's retail district along Riverside and adjacent to Toluca Lake, California. Also, Universal Pictures' Larry Crowne shot exterior scenes outside Burbank's Kmart, the store doubled for 'U Mart', and in The Hangover Part II (2011) a breakfast scene was filmed at the IHOP restaurant across the street.

The Burbank Airport is also an important part of the city's cinematic history. In the early days of Hollywood, many stars and filmmakers used the airport to travel to and from Los Angeles. The airport has also been featured in a number of films and television shows over the years, including The Hindenburg, Wonder Woman, and Perry Mason.

In 2012, an international filmmaking and acting academy opened its doors in Burbank. The school, the International Academy of Film and Television, traces its roots to the Philippines. The first class will include students from 30 countries.

=== Burbank today ===
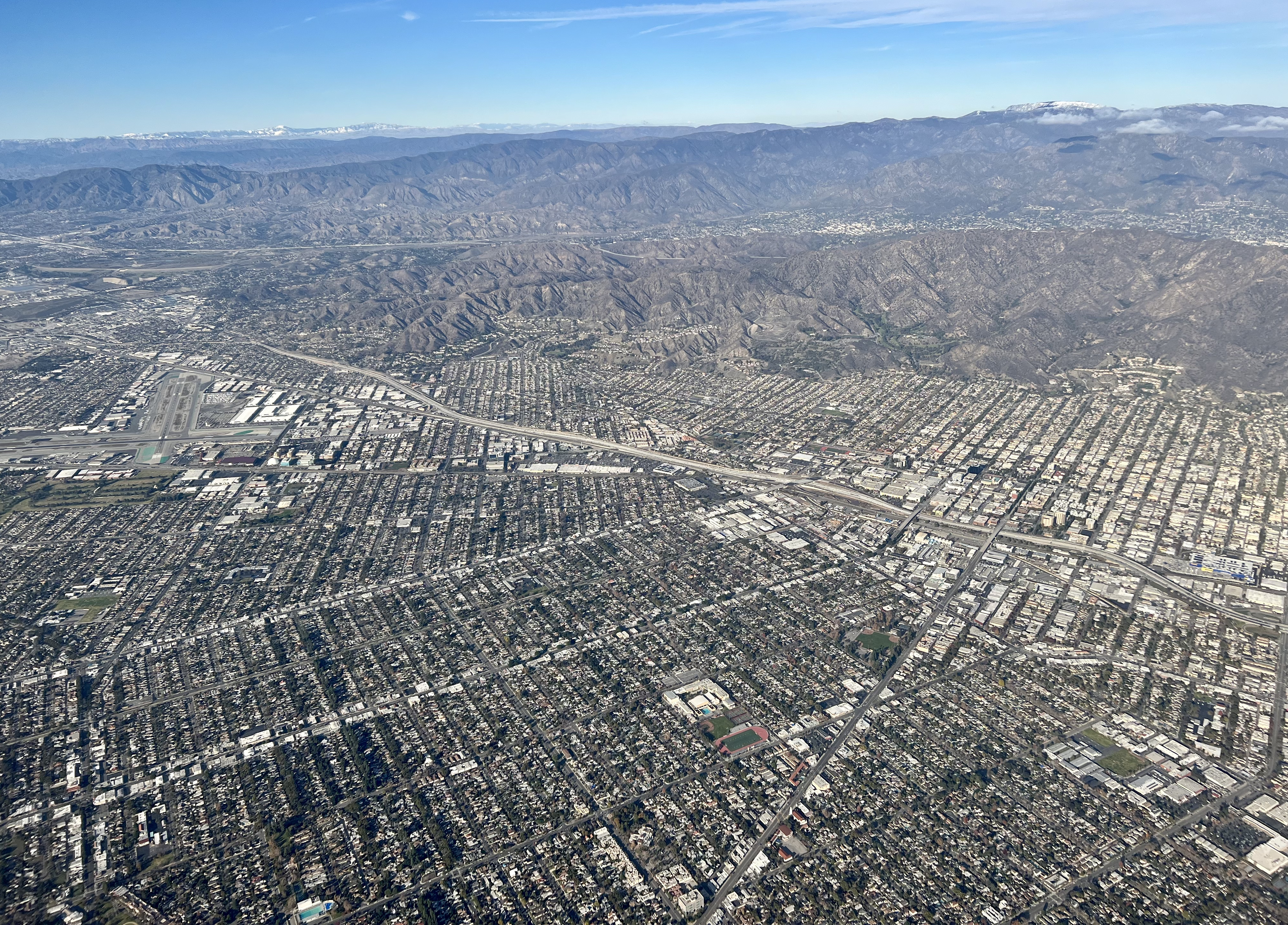
Aerial view of Burbank

Burbank, like other cities in California, has been facing many economic, political and social challenges in recent years. Housing affordability has remained an issue in Burbank, where the median home price was $1.2 million in 2025 Median gross rent in Burbank was $2,192 for the 2020–2024 period, with about 27% of renter households spending at least half of their household income on rent. These high housing costs are putting a strain on many residents, and as a result, a rent-control ordinance known as Measure RC was put on the ballot in 2020 to cap rent increases at 7% annually on at least 24,000 residential units; the measure failed to pass 36 to 64%. California law bars communities in the state from putting rent control on complexes built after February 1995. Rising housing costs in California in the last decade have contributed to a shortage of affordable housing in large metropolitan areas. Rent control is seen as a way to keep housing costs affordable but some economists have suggested ordinances limiting rent only contribute to California's chronic housing problem.

Burbank has adopted several anti-smoking ordinances. In late 2010, Burbank passed an ordinance prohibiting smoking in multi-family residences sharing ventilation systems. The rule went into effect in mid-2011. The new anti-smoking ordinance, which also prohibits smoking on private balconies and patios in multi-family residences, is considered the first of its kind in California. Since 2007, Burbank has prohibited smoking at all city-owned properties, downtown Burbank, the Chandler Bikeway, and sidewalk and pedestrian areas.

The murder of Burbank police officer Matthew Pavelka in 2003 by a local gang known as the Vineland Boys sparked an intensive investigation in conjunction with several other cities and resulted in the arrest of a number of gang members and other citizens in and around Burbank. Among those arrested was Burbank councilwoman Stacey Murphy, implicated in trading guns in exchange for drugs.

In December 2025, hundreds of people gathered to honor Burbank police K-9 Spike, who was fatally shot while protecting officers during a search for an armed suspect.

The city's namesake street, Burbank Boulevard, started getting a makeover in 2007. The city spent more than $10 million on landscaped medians, palm trees, lighting, benches, bike racks and other streetscape improvements. Additionally, various utility boxes throughout the city were painted in 2020 with original art inspired by the theme of "A World of Entertainment". Artists were selected through a committee consisting of City of Burbank representatives and members of art communities.

As of 2024, an estimated 164,000 people worked in Burbank. The physical imprints of the city's aviation industry remain. In late 2001, the Burbank Empire Center opened with aviation as the theme. The center, built at a cost of $250 million by Zelman Development Company, sits on Empire Avenue, the former site of Lockheed's top-secret "Skunk Works", and other Lockheed properties.

In a real estate deal announced in April 2019 Warner Bros. planned to open a series of two new Frank Gehry-designed office towers near the former NBC Studios lot that have been described as "like icebergs floating alongside the 134 freeway". The project was renamed Second Century, and the buildings opened in 2023.

During the 2028 Summer Olympics and Paralympics, the Warner Bros. Ranch will serve as the International Broadcast Center.

== Geography ==
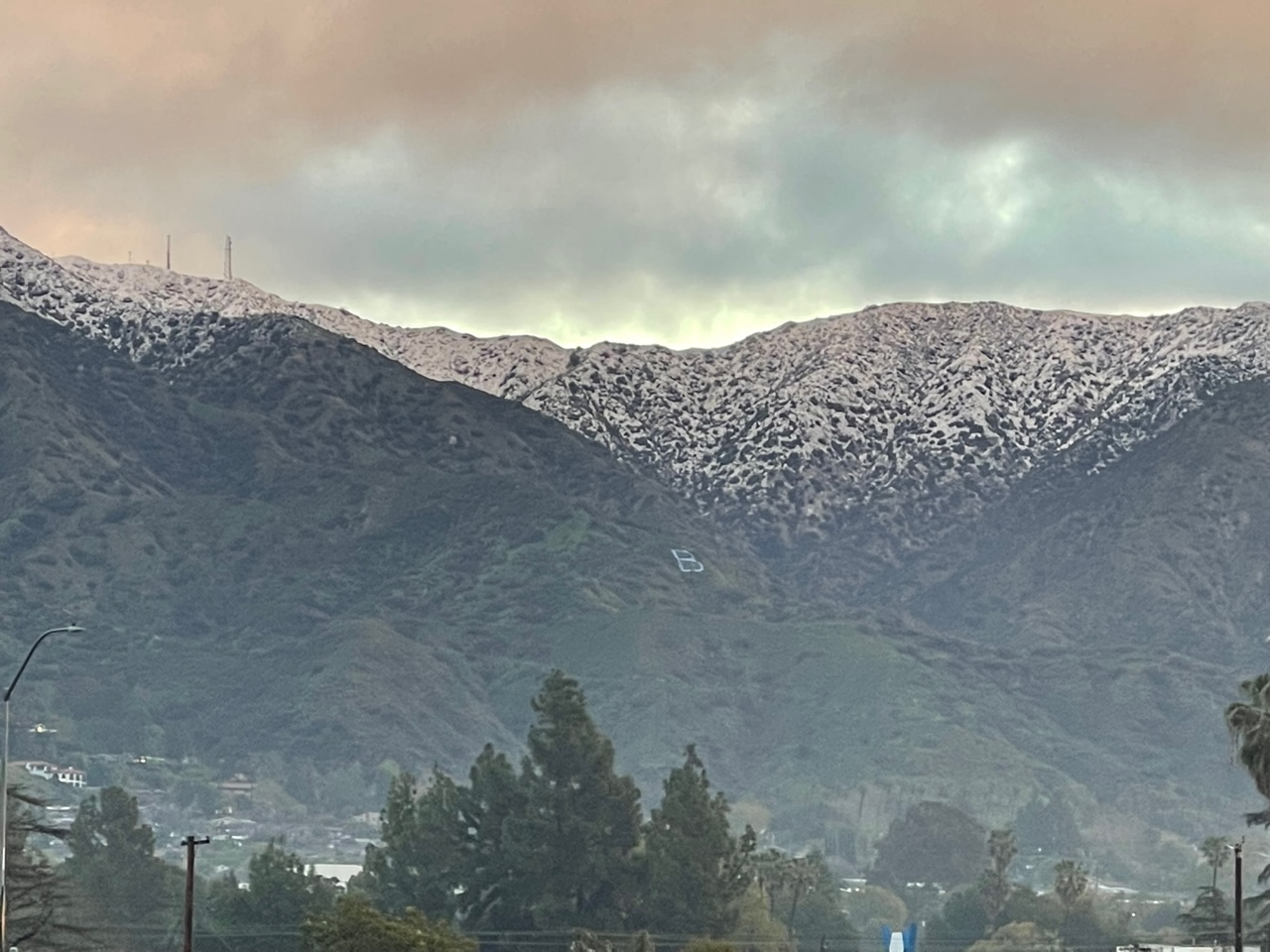
Snow-capped mountains above Burbank

According to the United States Census Bureau, Burbank has a total area of 17.35 square miles (44.9 km^{2}). 17.32 square miles (44.9 km^{2}) of it is land and 0.04 square miles (0.10 km^{2}) of it (0.12%) is water. It is bordered by Glendale to the east, North Hollywood and Toluca Lake on the west, and Griffith Park to the south. The Verdugo Mountains form the northern border.

Elevations in the city range from 500 feet (150 m) in the lower valley areas to about 800 feet (240 m) near the Verdugo Mountains. Most of Burbank features a water table more than 100 feet (30 m) deep, more than the measures found in the 1940s when the water table was within 50 feet (15 m) of the ground surface in some areas of Burbank.

=== Geology ===
The geology of the Burbank area is primarily composed of sedimentary rocks, including sandstone, siltstone, and shale. These rocks were formed by sediment deposited by ancient rivers and seas, and have been uplifted and folded due to tectonic activity. Burbank is located within a seismically active area. At least eight major faults are mapped within 13.5 miles (21.7 km) of Burbank's civic center. The San Fernando Fault, located 6 miles (10 km) northwest of Burbank's downtown, caused the 6.6 magnitude 1971 San Fernando earthquake.

The Verdugo Fault, which can reach a maximum estimated 6.5 magnitude earthquake on the Richter Scale, is about 1.5 miles (2.4 km) from the city of Burbank's civic center. This fault extends throughout the city and is located in the alluvium just south of the Verdugo Mountains. The fault is mapped on the surface in northeastern Glendale, and at various locations in Burbank. Other nearby faults include the Northridge Hills Fault (10 miles (16 km) northwest of Burbank), the Newport–Inglewood Fault (12.5 miles (20.1 km)), Whittier Fault (21 miles (34 km)), and lastly the San Andreas Fault (28 miles (45 km)) with its 8.25 magnitude potential on the Richter Scale.

The 1971 San Fernando earthquake, with a magnitude of 6.6, caused some damage in Burbank. Poorly reinforced and unreinforced masonry fences were damaged as well as masonry chimneys. Pacific Manor care facility on Glenoaks, which was later razed and replaced with a new care facility, was badly damaged and had to be evacuated. Some factories, including Lockheed, had spills of hazardous materials. There were also small fires from electrical or fuel gas-related sources. Lastly, there were cases of flooding in buildings due to broken pipes and risers used for fire sprinklers.

Burbank suffered $61.8 million in damage from the 1994 Northridge earthquake, according to the city's finance department. There was $58 million in damage to privately owned facilities in commercial, industrial, manufacturing and entertainment businesses. Another $3.8 million in losses included damaged public buildings, roadways and a power station in Sylmar that is partly owned by Burbank. The Burbank Fire Department responded to 292 calls for damage inspections and reports of natural gas leaks. The damage caused was more extensive than the 1971 San Fernando earthquake but still relatively moderate in nature.

=== Climate ===
Burbank, California

Climate chart (precipitation, max. and min. temperature)
J	F	M	A	M	J	J	A	S	O	N	D
3 67 45	4 67 46	2.4 70 49	0.7 73 52	0.3 76 57	0.1 80 60	0 87 65	0 89 65	0.1 87 63	0.6 79 58	0.7 73 49	2 66 44
- █ Average max. and min. temperatures in °F
- █ Precipitation totals in inches
Metric conversion
J	F	M	A	M	J	J	A	S	O	N	D
76 19 7	102 19 8	61 21 9	18 23 11	7.6 24 14	2.5 27 16	0 31 18	0 32 18	2.5 31 17	15 26 14	18 23 9	51 19 7
- █ Average max. and min. temperatures in °C
- █ Precipitation totals in mm

Burbank has a hot-summer Mediterranean climate (Köppen: Csa) with hot summers and mild winters. The highest recorded temperature was 114 °F (46 °C) which occurred on July 6, 2018, on September 6, 2020, and on September 5 and 6, 2024. The lowest recorded temperature was 22 °F (−6 °C) on December 8, 1978, and again on January 29, 1979. Average annual precipitation is just over 17 inches (430 mm), but is highly variable from year to year. Wet years (with well over 510 millimetres or 20 inches of rainfall) are generally associated with El Niño conditions, and dry years with La Niña. The driest water year (October to September of the next year) on record was the 2013–14 season with 5.37 in (136 mm), while the wettest was 1940–41 with 41.29 in (1,049 mm). The months that receive the most precipitation are February and January, respectively. It rarely snows in Burbank, as it is located in a Mediterranean climate zone, which typically experiences mild winters. However, the city has experienced snow several times, including in December 1931, January 1932, January 1949, January 1950, and February 2011.

Climate data for Burbank-Glendale-Pasadena Airport, California (1991–2020, extremes 1939–present)
Month	Jan	Feb	Mar	Apr	May	Jun	Jul	Aug	Sep	Oct	Nov	Dec	Year
Record high °F (°C)	92 (33)	92 (33)	99 (37)	105 (41)	107 (42)	111 (44)	114 (46)	112 (44)	114 (46)	108 (42)	102 (39)	95 (35)	114 (46)
Mean maximum °F (°C)	82.3 (27.9)	83.3 (28.5)	85.9 (29.9)	92.0 (33.3)	93.2 (34.0)	95.1 (35.1)	99.9 (37.7)	101.7 (38.7)	103.0 (39.4)	95.5 (35.3)	88.3 (31.3)	80.9 (27.2)	106.2 (41.2)
Mean daily maximum °F (°C)	67.0 (19.4)	66.8 (19.3)	69.5 (20.8)	72.7 (22.6)	75.5 (24.2)	80.3 (26.8)	86.7 (30.4)	88.9 (31.6)	86.6 (30.3)	79.4 (26.3)	72.5 (22.5)	66.1 (18.9)	76.0 (24.4)
Daily mean °F (°C)	56.2 (13.4)	56.6 (13.7)	59.3 (15.2)	62.3 (16.8)	66.1 (18.9)	70.1 (21.2)	75.6 (24.2)	76.9 (24.9)	74.8 (23.8)	68.5 (20.3)	60.8 (16.0)	55.2 (12.9)	65.2 (18.4)
Mean daily minimum °F (°C)	45.3 (7.4)	46.4 (8.0)	49.0 (9.4)	51.9 (11.1)	56.6 (13.7)	59.9 (15.5)	64.5 (18.1)	64.9 (18.3)	62.9 (17.2)	57.5 (14.2)	49.0 (9.4)	44.2 (6.8)	54.3 (12.4)
Mean minimum °F (°C)	33.9 (1.1)	36.4 (2.4)	38.1 (3.4)	42.3 (5.7)	48.8 (9.3)	53.0 (11.7)	57.3 (14.1)	57.1 (13.9)	53.3 (11.8)	47.6 (8.7)	38.3 (3.5)	33.4 (0.8)	31.1 (−0.5)
Record low °F (°C)	22 (−6)	27 (−3)	23 (−5)	32 (0)	39 (4)	43 (6)	45 (7)	46 (8)	43 (6)	33 (1)	29 (−2)	22 (−6)	22 (−6)
Average precipitation inches (mm)	2.97 (75)	3.95 (100)	2.43 (62)	0.74 (19)	0.29 (7.4)	0.09 (2.3)	0.01 (0.25)	0.01 (0.25)	0.11 (2.8)	0.60 (15)	0.69 (18)	2.02 (51)	13.91 (353)
Average precipitation days (≥ 0.01 in)	6.2	6.8	5.8	3.3	1.4	0.7	0.2	0.4	1.0	2.5	3.0	5.2	36.5
Source: NOAA

Climate data for Burbank Valley Pump Plant, California, 1991–2020 normals, extremes 1966–present
Month	Jan	Feb	Mar	Apr	May	Jun	Jul	Aug	Sep	Oct	Nov	Dec	Year
Record high °F (°C)	94 (34)	94 (34)	99 (37)	105 (41)	107 (42)	111 (44)	113 (45)	110 (43)	114 (46)	108 (42)	101 (38)	90 (32)	114 (46)
Mean maximum °F (°C)	84.7 (29.3)	83.8 (28.8)	86.9 (30.5)	91.8 (33.2)	92.1 (33.4)	94.7 (34.8)	98.2 (36.8)	100.9 (38.3)	102.2 (39.0)	98.5 (36.9)	90.9 (32.7)	83.2 (28.4)	105.0 (40.6)
Mean daily maximum °F (°C)	69.0 (20.6)	68.5 (20.3)	71.0 (21.7)	73.5 (23.1)	75.4 (24.1)	80.1 (26.7)	85.8 (29.9)	88.3 (31.3)	86.8 (30.4)	80.9 (27.2)	74.6 (23.7)	68.0 (20.0)	76.8 (24.9)
Daily mean °F (°C)	55.8 (13.2)	56.2 (13.4)	58.9 (14.9)	61.9 (16.6)	65.0 (18.3)	69.4 (20.8)	74.2 (23.4)	75.6 (24.2)	73.7 (23.2)	67.5 (19.7)	60.4 (15.8)	54.8 (12.7)	64.5 (18.0)
Mean daily minimum °F (°C)	42.6 (5.9)	44.0 (6.7)	46.9 (8.3)	50.2 (10.1)	54.7 (12.6)	58.7 (14.8)	62.6 (17.0)	62.9 (17.2)	60.6 (15.9)	54.2 (12.3)	46.3 (7.9)	41.7 (5.4)	52.1 (11.2)
Mean minimum °F (°C)	34.6 (1.4)	36.3 (2.4)	38.6 (3.7)	42.7 (5.9)	48.2 (9.0)	52.6 (11.4)	57.1 (13.9)	57.4 (14.1)	53.0 (11.7)	46.7 (8.2)	38.6 (3.7)	32.9 (0.5)	31.9 (−0.1)
Record low °F (°C)	22 (−6)	27 (−3)	23 (−5)	32 (0)	39 (4)	43 (6)	45 (7)	46 (8)	45 (7)	33 (1)	29 (−2)	22 (−6)	22 (−6)
Average precipitation inches (mm)	3.65 (93)	4.47 (114)	2.79 (71)	0.87 (22)	0.40 (10)	0.10 (2.5)	0.04 (1.0)	0.01 (0.25)	0.13 (3.3)	0.69 (18)	0.85 (22)	2.50 (64)	16.50 (419)
Average precipitation days (≥ 0.01 in)	6.3	6.6	5.8	2.7	1.7	0.6	0.3	0.1	0.6	1.9	2.7	5.3	34.6
Source 1: NOAA
Source 2: National Weather Service

==== Extremes ====
- Highest recorded temperature: 114 °F (46 °C)
- Lowest recorded temperature: 22 °F (−6 °C)
- Warmest month: August
- Coolest month: December
- Highest precipitation: February
- Lowest precipitation: July/August

=== Neighborhoods ===
==== Magnolia Park area ====
Magnolia Park, established on Burbank's western edge in the early 1920s, had 3,500 houses within six years after its creation. When the city refused to pay for a street connecting the subdivision with the Cahuenga Pass, real estate developer and daily farmer Earl L. White did it himself and called it Hollywood Way. White was the owner of KELW, the San Fernando Valley's first commercial radio station, which went on the air on February 13, 1927. KELW, a 1,000-watt station, could be heard by listeners up and down the Pacific Coast. Some reports suggest it also could be heard as far away as New Zealand. The 1,000-watt radio station was sold in 1935 to the Hearst newspaper company. KELW was a short-lived radio station, operating for just a decade out of Burbank between 1927 and 1937.

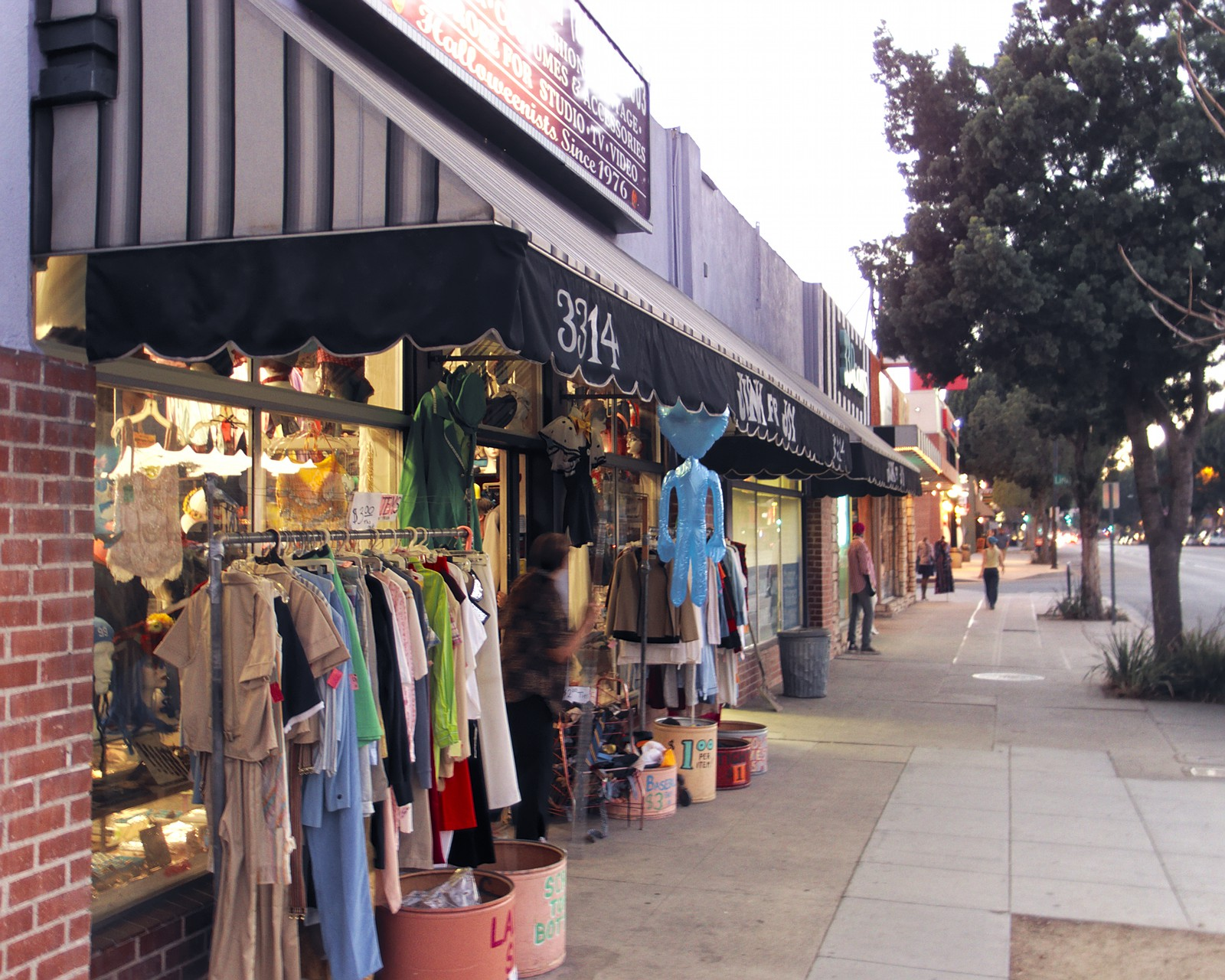
Vintage clothing shops in the Magnolia Park area of Burbank

The city's Magnolia Park area, bordered by West Verdugo Avenue to the south, Chandler Boulevard to the north, Hollywood Way to the west and Buena Vista Street to the east is known for its small-town feel, shady streets and Eisenhower-era storefronts. Most of the homes in the area date to the 1940s, when they were built for veterans of World War II. Central to the community is Magnolia Boulevard, known for its antique shops, boutiques, thrift shops, corner markets, and occasional chain stores. The neighborhood is in constant struggle with developers looking to expand and update Magnolia Boulevard. Independent merchants and slow-growth groups have fought off new construction and big-box stores. The neighborhood remains quiet despite being beneath the airport flight path and bordered by arterial streets.

One of the centerpieces of the area's comeback has been Porto's Bakery at the old Albin's drug store site located at 3606 and 3614 West Magnolia Boulevard.

Other enhancements include converting the disused railroad right-of-way along Chandler Boulevard into a landscaped bikeway and pedestrian path. This project was part of a larger bike route linking Burbank's downtown Metrolink station with the B Line subway in North Hollywood. The bike-friendly neighborhood and vintage shops has made this a part of the San Fernando Valley that is frequented by Hipsters.

==== Rancho Equestrian area ====
Perhaps the most famous collection of neighborhoods in Burbank is the Rancho Equestrian District, flanked roughly by Griffith Park to the south, Victory Boulevard to the east, Olive Avenue to the west and Alameda Avenue to the north. Part of the Rancho community extends into neighboring Glendale.

The neighborhood zoning allows residents to keep horses on their property. Single-family homes far outnumber multifamily units in the Rancho, and many of the homes have stables and horse stalls. There are about 785 single-family homes, 180 condos and townhomes, and 25 horses.

The Rancho has traditionally been represented by the Burbank Rancho Homeowners, which was formed in 1963 by Floran Frank and other equestrian enthusiasts and is the oldest neighborhood group in the city.

Rancho real estate sells at a premium due to its equestrian zoning, numerous parks, connection to riding trails in Griffith Park and its adjacency to Warner Bros. and Disney Studios. Riverside Drive, its main thoroughfare, is lined with sycamore and oak trees, some more than 70 years old. It is quite common to see people on horseback riding along Riverside Drive's designated horse lanes. Of historical note, the Rancho was the home to TV star Mister Ed, the talking horse of the show of the same name. Other notable former Rancho residents included Ava Gardner and Tab Hunter, as well as Bette Davis in the adjoining Glendale Rancho area.

The rancho is especially known for its parks and open space. This includes centrally located Mountain View Park, Johnny Carson Park, Los Angeles' Griffith Park and Equestrian Center, Bette Davis Park (in the adjoining Glendale Rancho) and the neighborhood's beloved Polliwog, extending along Disney's animation building and used by local residents to exercise their horses.

In the 1960s, General Motors Corporation opened training facilities on Riverside Drive in the Rancho area, but in 1999 decided to contract out dealer-technician training to Raytheon Company and dismissed a dozen employees. In 2006, GM confiscated EV1 electric-powered cars from drivers who had leased them and moved them to the GM facility in Burbank. When environmentalists determined the location of the cars, they began a month-long vigil at the facility. To challenge the company's line that they were unwanted, they found buyers for all of them, offering a total of $1.9 million. The vehicles were loaded on trucks and removed, and several activists who tried to intervene were arrested. The property was sold in 2012 to Lycée International de Los Angeles (LILA), a dual French-English language school, which opened a private high school in August 2013. The new school includes 23 classrooms, four labs, an auditorium, an art room, an indoor sports rooms, two outdoor volleyball courts and basketball courts, according to the school's website.

=== Notable locations ===
- Burbank Central Library
- Burbank City Hall
- Buena Vista Branch Burbank Public Library
- De Bell Municipal Golf Course
- Providence Saint Joseph Medical Center
- Northwest Park Branch Burbank Public Library
- Southern California Genealogical Society Library
- Gordon R. Howard Museum
- George Izay Park
- Martial Arts History Museum
- Valhalla Memorial Park Cemetery
- Nickelodeon Animation Studio
- The Burbank Studios
- Walt Disney Studios
- Warner Bros. Ranch
- Warner Bros. Studios
- Hasbro Studios

==== Warner Bros. Studios ====
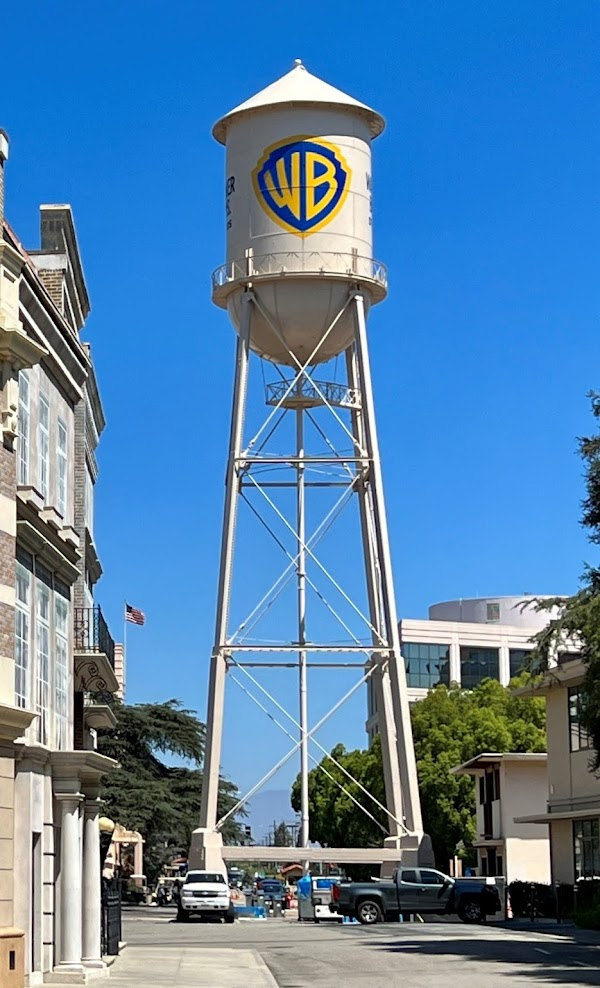
The Warner Bros. Studios, the headquarters of Warner Bros., a subsidiary of Warner Bros. Discovery

Warner Bros. Studios, Burbank is a major filmmaking facility owned and run by Warner Bros. Entertainment Inc. in Burbank, California. First National Pictures built the 62-acre (25 ha) studio lot in 1926 as it expanded from a film distributor to film production. The financial success of The Jazz Singer and The Singing Fool enabled Warner Bros. to purchase a majority interest in First National in September 1928 and it began moving its productions into the Burbank lot. The First National studio, as it was then known, became the official home of Warner Bros.–First National Pictures with four sound stages. By 1937, Warner Bros. had all but closed the Sunset studio, making the Burbank lot its main headquarters—which it remains to this day. Eventually, Warner dissolved the First National company and the site has often been referred to as simply Warner Bros. Studios since. The studio runs public backlot tours that offer visitors the chance to glimpse behind the scenes of one of the oldest film studios in the world (Warner Bros. Studio Tour Hollywood).

==== Walt Disney Studios ====
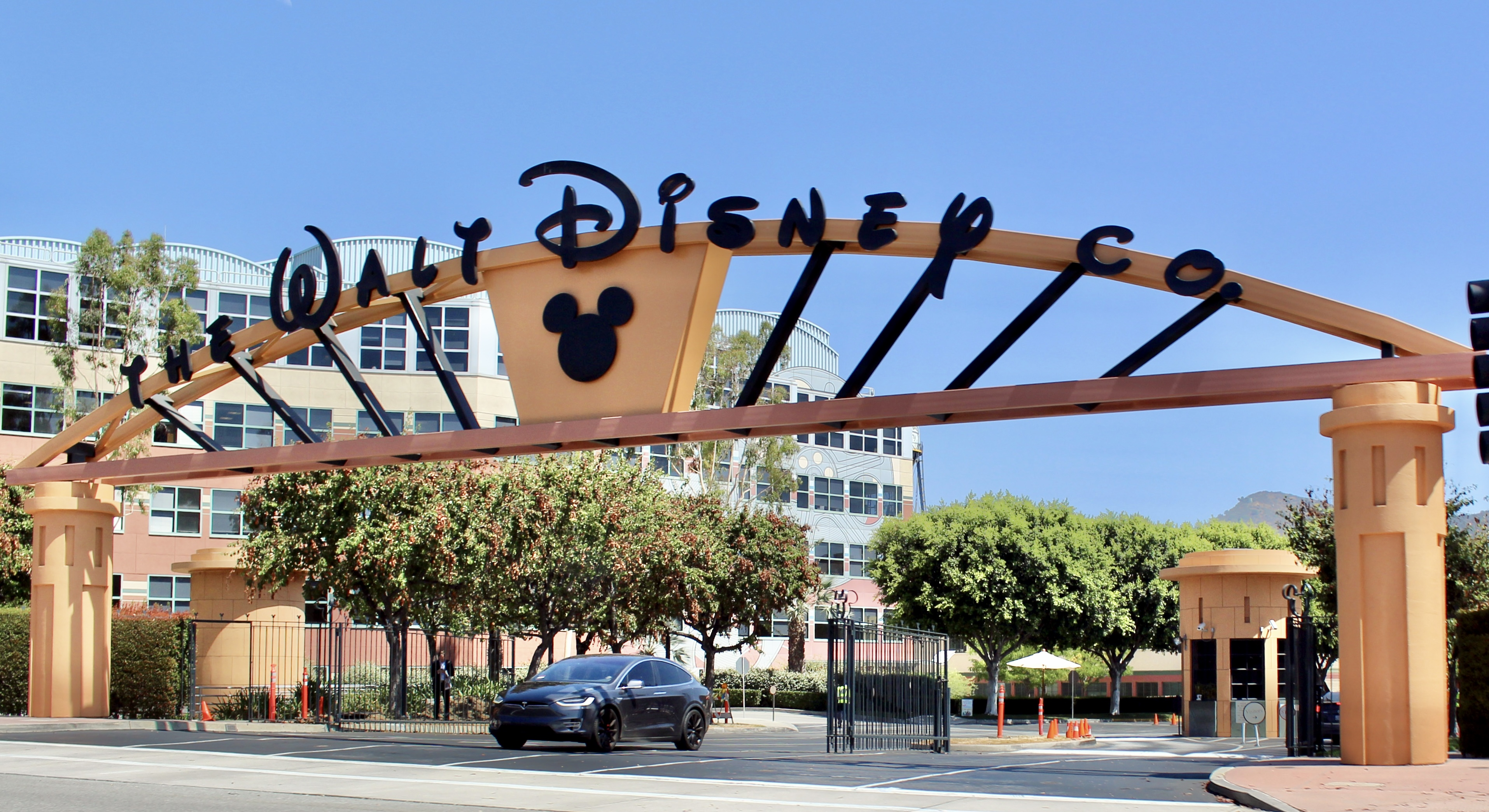
The Walt Disney Studios, the headquarters of The Walt Disney Company

The Walt Disney Studios in Burbank serve as the international headquarters for media conglomerate the Walt Disney Company. Disney staff began the move from the old Disney studio at Hyperion Avenue in Silver Lake on December 24, 1939. Designed primarily by Kem Weber under the supervision of Walt Disney and his brother Roy, the Burbank Disney Studio buildings are the only studios to survive from the Golden Age of film. Disney is the only remaining major film studio company to remain independent from a larger conglomerate and whose parent entity is still located in the Los Angeles area. Disney is also the only major film studio that does not run public backlot tours.

==== George Izay Park ====
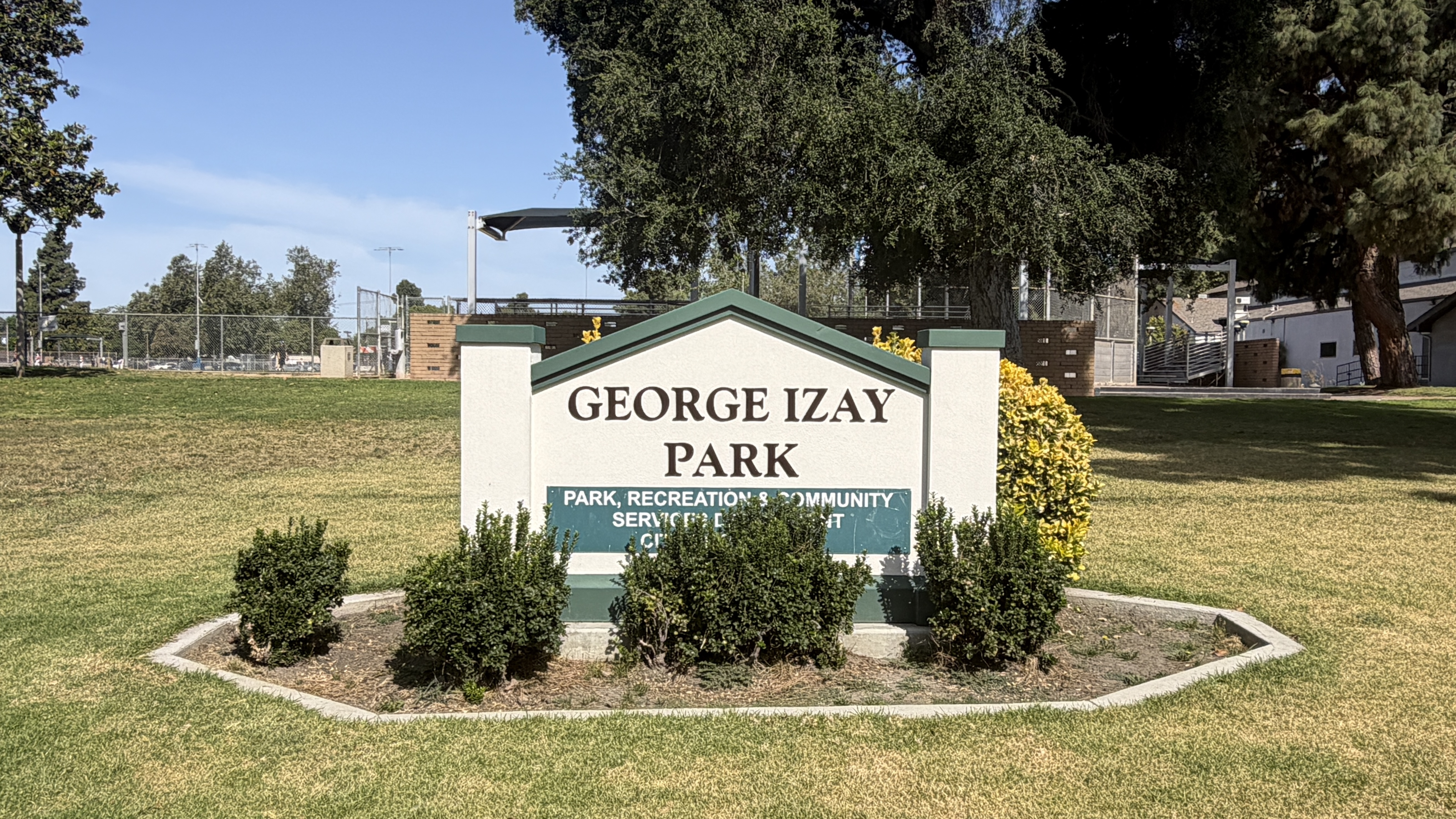
George Izay Park

The City of Burbank maintains an extensive parks system, with 27 parks citywide, including two public swimming pools. One of these parks is George Izay Park, formerly known as Olive Memorial Park. From 1949 to 1952, the St. Louis Browns, a Major League Baseball team, selected Burbank as their destination for spring training to escape the harsh winters of the Midwest. As the players donned their uniforms and stepped onto the field at Olive Memorial Park, they not only honed their baseball skills but also forged a special bond with Burbank and its Hollywood luminaries. Workers in Burbank came by during their lunch hour to watch the game. Additionally, well-known entertainment figures such as Bing Crosby, Bob Hope, and Nat King Cole would gather to witness the action. Marilyn Monroe herself even joined the Browns for promotional photos. Over time, the St. Louis Browns would evolve into the Baltimore Orioles. The Los Angeles Rams also used the stadium from 1958 to 1962 as a practice field. While the stadium, originally dedicated in 1947 to commemorate the soldiers lost in World War II, saw its stands razed in 1995, the fields themselves endure. In 1984, the park underwent a name change and became known as George Izay Park.

== Demographics ==
Historical population
Census	Pop.	Note	%±
1920	2,913		—
1930	16,662		472.0%
1940	34,337		106.1%
1950	78,577		128.8%
1960	90,155		14.7%
1970	88,871		−1.4%
1980	84,625		−4.8%
1990	93,643		10.7%
2000	100,316		7.1%
2010	103,340		3.0%
2020	107,337		3.9%
2025 (est.)	102,988	▼	−4.1%
U.S. Decennial Census

Burbank experienced a 4.8% increase in population between 2000 and 2016, bringing its total population in 2016 to 105,110. Population growth was influenced by Burbank's expanding employment base, high-quality public schools, and access to regional transportation routes and metropolitan Los Angeles. However, Burbank's population declined after the 2020 census, with the Census Bureau estimating 102,988 residents as of July 1, 2025.

Burbank, California – Racial and ethnic composition Note: the US Census treats Hispanic/Latino as an ethnic category. This table excludes Latinos from the racial categories and assigns them to a separate category. Hispanics/Latinos may be of any race.
Race / Ethnicity (NH = Non-Hispanic)	Pop 1980	Pop 1990	Pop 2000	Pop 2010	Pop 2020	% 1980	% 1990	% 2000	% 2010	% 2020
White alone (NH)	67,257	64,453	59,590	60,265	60,350	79.48%	68.83%	59.40%	58.32%	56.22%
Black or African American alone (NH)	523	1,497	1,915	2,443	2,891	0.62%	1.60%	1.91%	2.36%	2.69%
Native American or Alaska Native alone (NH)	821	406	314	196	222	0.97%	0.43%	0.31%	0.19%	0.21%
Asian alone (NH)	2,192	5,979	9,045	11,753	12,282	2.59%	6.38%	9.02%	11.37%	11.44%
Pacific Islander alone (NH)	2,192	5,979	121	76	98	2.59%	6.38%	0.12%	0.07%	0.09%
Other race alone (NH)	116	136	177	249	618	0.14%	0.15%	0.18%	0.24%	0.58%
Mixed race or Multiracial (NH)	x	x	4,201	3,048	4,915	x	x	4.19%	2.95%	4.58%
Hispanic or Latino (any race)	13,716	21,172	24,953	25,310	25,961	16.21%	22.61%	24.87%	24.49%	24.19%
Total	84,625	93,643	100,316	103,340	107,337	100.00%	100.00%	100.00%	100.00%	100.00%

=== 2020 census ===
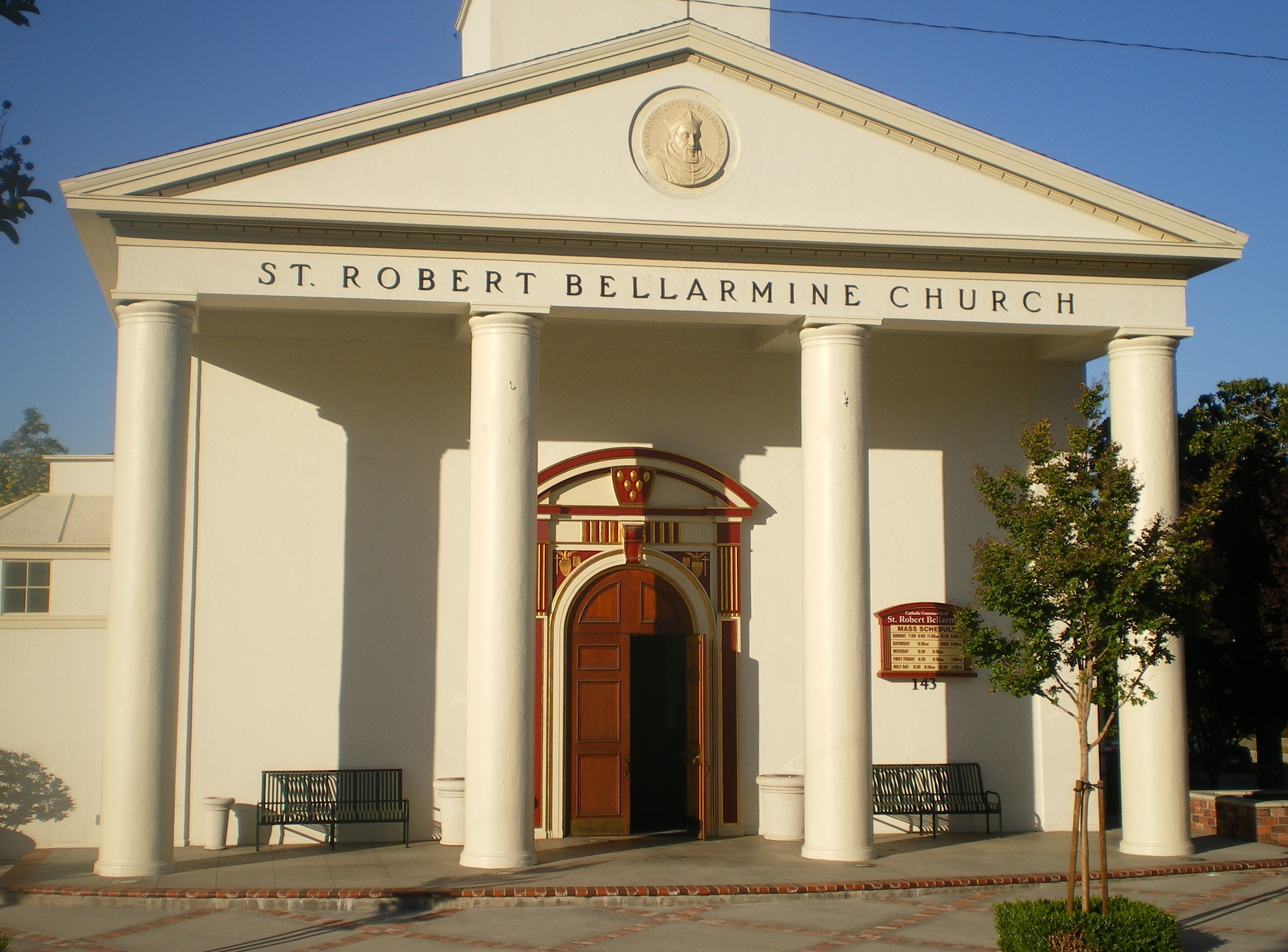
St. Robert Bellarmine Catholic Church, built in 1907

The 2020 United States census reported that Burbank had a population of 107,337. The population density was 6,198.7 inhabitants per square mile (2,393.3/km^{2}). The racial makeup of Burbank was 60.9% White, 2.9% African American, 0.8% Native American, 11.7% Asian, 0.1% Pacific Islander, 10.1% from other races, and 13.6% from two or more races. Hispanic or Latino of any race were 24.2% of the population.

The census reported that 99.3% of the population lived in households, 0.4% lived in non-institutionalized group quarters, and 0.3% were institutionalized.

There were 43,644 households, out of which 26.9% included children under the age of 18, 43.3% were married-couple households, 6.7% were cohabiting couple households, 29.8% had a female householder with no partner present, and 20.2% had a male householder with no partner present. 29.3% of households were one person, and 10.2% were one person aged 65 or older. The average household size was 2.44. There were 26,600 families (60.9% of all households).

The age distribution was 17.7% under the age of 18, 7.6% aged 18 to 24, 31.5% aged 25 to 44, 26.9% aged 45 to 64, and 16.3% who were 65 years of age or older. The median age was 40.4 years. For every 100 females, there were 92.8 males.

There were 45,616 housing units at an average density of 2,634.3 units per square mile (1,017.1 units/km^{2}), of which 43,644 (95.7%) were occupied. Of these, 41.9% were owner-occupied, and 58.1% were occupied by renters.

In 2023, the US Census Bureau estimated that the median household income was $95,816, and the per capita income was $55,630. About 7.1% of families and 10.7% of the population were below the poverty line.

=== Earlier ===
While white residents continue to comprise the majority of Burbank's population, this proportion has decreased from almost 80% in 1980 to approximately 72% in 2000. In contrast, the share of Hispanic residents increased steadily over the past two decades, growing from 16% in 1980 to 25% in 2000. Although Asian residents represent a smaller segment of the population, the share of Asian residents more than tripled since 1980, increasing from 3% in 1980 to 9% in 2000. The black population remained limited, rising from less than 1% in 1980 to almost 2% in 2000.

According to Mapping L.A., Mexican and Armenian were the most common ancestries in 2000. Mexico and Iran were the most common foreign places of birth.

=== Crime ===
Burbank's overall crime rate for violent and property crimes during 2018 fell by about nearly 11% compared with 2017 levels, according to the statistics from the city police department. It represented the first decline in three years, with property and violent crimes in the city falling from 3,197 in 2017 to 2,852 in 2018. Rapes also were down in 2018, according to the police data. There were no murders listed in Burbank during 2018, 2017 and 2016. Three bodies were found in Burbank in 2018, but these homicides were later determined to have occurred in Riverside County. Niche, a national online database that publishes city rankings, listed Burbank in 2018 as one of the top 15 "safest cities in America" and number 63 in terms of the "best cities to live".

Burbank's violent crime rate was approximately 2.34 per 1,000 people in 2009, well below the national average of 4.29 per 1,000 people as reported by the U.S. Department of Justice in the Bureau of Justice Statistics. Furthermore, Burbank was named again in 2010 as One of the Nation's 100 Best Communities for Young People by America's Promise Alliance.

Starting in December 2011, Burbank police began posting arrest information online. The website contains archives from the start of the program.

Criminal offenses are charged and locally prosecuted in the Burbank Courthouse. The Los Angeles District Attorney handles all of the felony violations which occur within Burbank city limits. The Burbank City Attorney, through its Prosecution Division, handles the remaining violations, which include all misdemeanors and municipal code violations, as well as traffic offenses. The Burbank Superior Court is a high-volume courthouse, which is part of the Los Angeles County Superior Court system. The City Prosecutor files approximately 5,500 cases yearly, and the Burbank Police Department directly files approximately 12,000 to 15,000 traffic citations per year. Burbank Court, Division Two, handles all of the misdemeanor arraignments for Burbank offenses. A typical arraignment calendar is between 100 and 120 cases each day, including 15 to 25 defendants who are brought to court in custody. Many cases are initiated by arrests at the Hollywood Burbank Airport. Common arrests include possession of drugs such as marijuana, weapons, prohibited items, as well as false identification charges.

== Economy ==
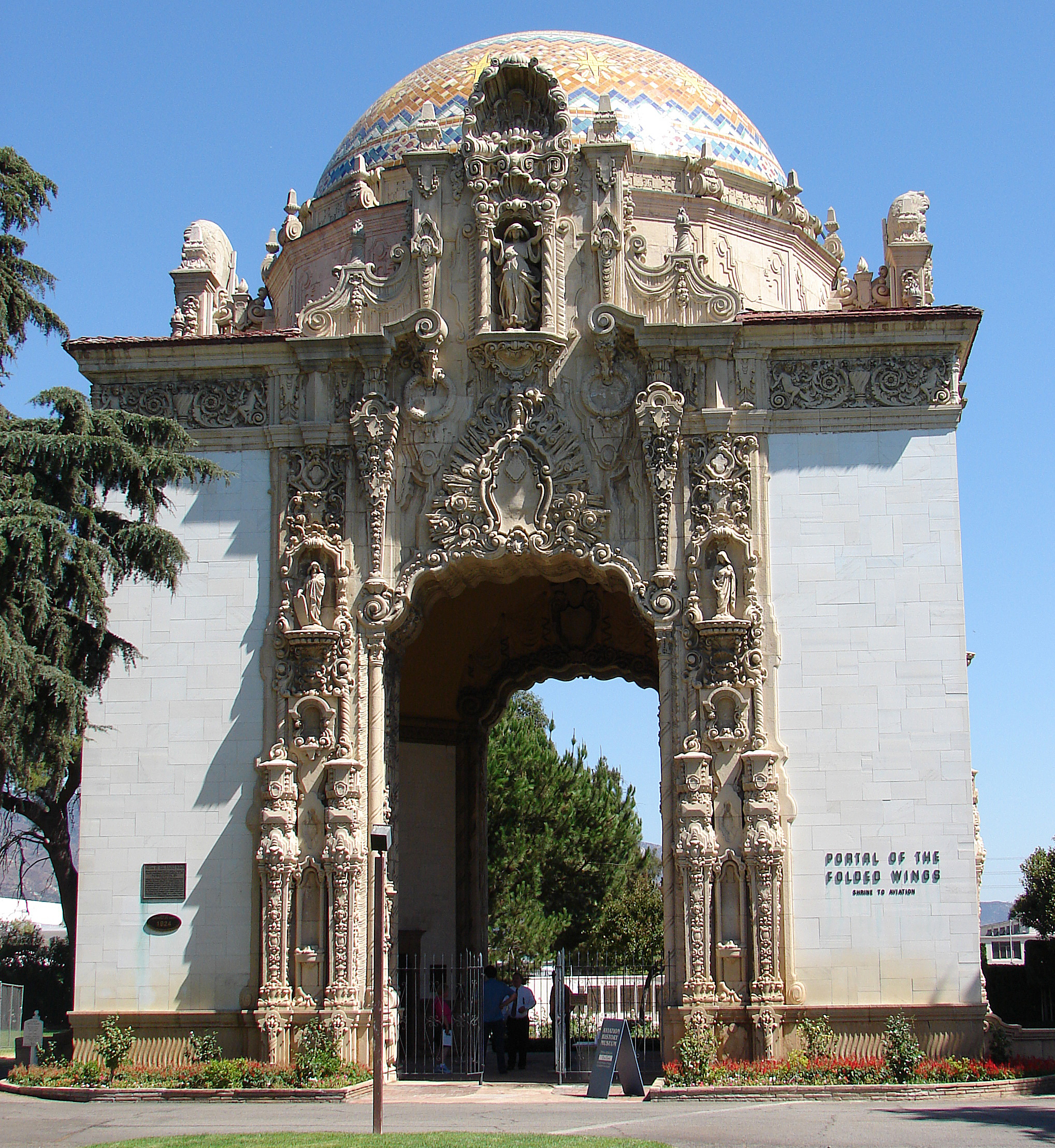
The California Churrigueresque style Portal of the Folded Wings Shrine to Aviation

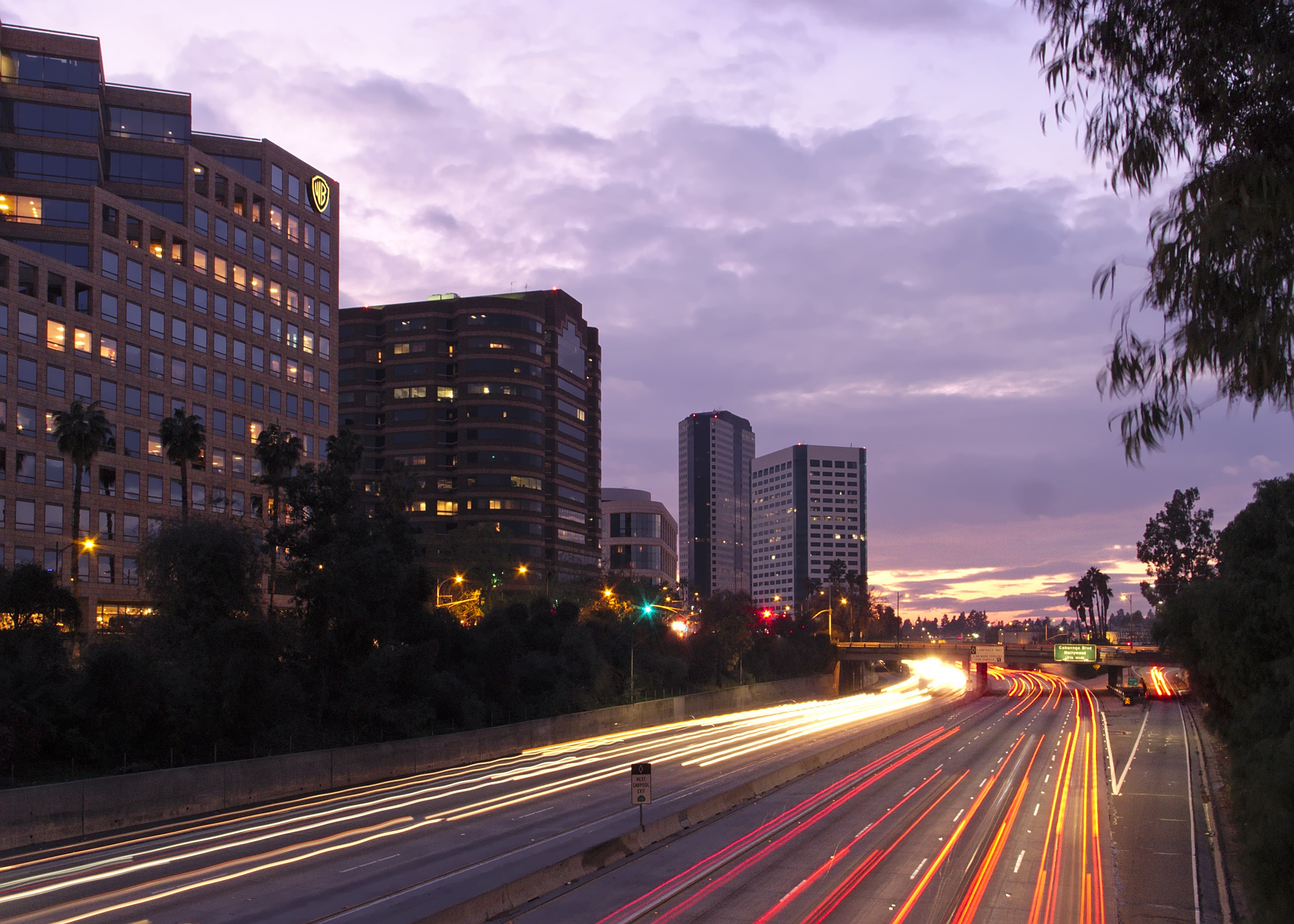
Office space in the Burbank media district along California State Route 134

The second-largest office space market in the San Fernando Valley is located in Burbank. Much of the space is utilized by the entertainment industry, which has among the highest office lease rates in the region. In 2017, two entities owned about 70% of Burbank's office supply, inside the Media District.

About 150,000 people work in Burbank each day, more than live in the city. As of 2016, only 25% of the city's employed residents worked in Burbank. According to the U.S. Census Bureau, in 2012 there were 17,587 companies within the city of Burbank and with combined payroll totaling in excess of $13.4 billion.

Nearby Hollywood is a symbol of the entertainment industry and much of the production occurs in Burbank. Many companies have headquarters or facilities in Burbank, including Warner Bros. Entertainment, Warner Music Group, Legendary Pictures, the Walt Disney Company, ABC, The CW, Cartoon Network Studios with the West Coast headquarters of Cartoon Network, Nickelodeon Animation Studio, New Wave Entertainment, Insomniac Games and West Coast Customs. Many ancillary companies from Arri cameras, to Entertainment Partners, Filmtools, Centerstaging, JL Fisher, and Matthews Studio Equipment also maintain a presence in Burbank.

Local IATSE union offices for the Stagehands Local 33, Grips Local 80, Make-up and Hairstylist Local 706, Set Painters Local 729 and Animation Guild Local 839 also make their home in Burbank with Teamsters Local 399, IBEW Local 40 and many other IATSE locals nearby.

Burbank's economy felt stress as a result of the recession. From 2007 to 2016, the city had more than 1,200 home foreclosures, with about three-fourths of them happening from 2007 to 2011. City officials prepared for cutbacks going into 2009. Burbank's City Manager, Mike Flad, estimated the city's 2009–10 fiscal budget would suffer a 5% shortfall. In fact, the city's budget woes continued well into 2017. At the beginning of the budget development process for fiscal 2016–17, the city's staff was projecting a recurring budget deficit of $1.3 million for the year. That followed several years of across-the-board budget cuts by various city departments, according to budget documents. Even so, the city still managed to add some new positions and increase fire staffing. One of the increased costs Burbank and many other California cities are coping with is unfunded pension liability.

The city manager's budget message in 2016–17 identified Burbank's aging infrastructure as one of the top priorities of city officials but also one of its biggest financial challenges. The city's 2017 budget documents indicated Burbank should be spending at least $5 million more annually to address the backlog of maintenance on infrastructure and update Burbank's facilities. Regardless, the city forecasts it will post a deficit for at least the next five years, projecting about $9.4 million in red ink in fiscal year 2017–18 and a deficit of about $27.4 million by 2022–23.

As of April 2012, unemployment in the Burbank area stood at 8.4%, or below the state's jobless rate of 10.9%, according to the California Employment Development Department. Back in January 2011, the unemployment rate in Burbank had reached 10.7%, according to EDD. By November 2017, though, the unemployment rate in Burbank was just 3.4%, below the 4.1% rate in Los Angeles County, according to EDD data. In November 2022, Burbank's unemployment was at 5.4%, compared to 7.2% in November 2021. By December 2025, the rate had risen slightly to 5.9%, remaining just above the levels reported in the cities of Los Angeles and Glendale.

One bright spot in the otherwise bleak job market during the late 2007 into 2009 recession was Kaiser Permanente's decision to relocate some administrative offices near the Burbank airport. The relocation from Kaiser's Glendale and Pasadena administrative offices to Burbank was completed in 2009. Additionally, KCET television announced plans in 2012 to relocate to Burbank's Media District. KCET is a former PBS station and the largest independent station in southern and central California. Hasbro Studios also is located in Burbank just east of the airport in a commercial complex previously occupied by Yahoo.

In 2016, developer Overton Moore Properties purchased 60 acres (24 ha) of formerly under-developed industrial land adjacent to the Hollywood Burbank Airport at North Hollywood Way and San Fernando Road, and after approval by the Burbank City Council in April 2019, construction commenced as part of one of the largest infill projects in the San Fernando Valley. The $300-million Avion Burbank project includes industrial, creative office, and retail space, as well as a 150-room hotel. The industrial component of the development was largely completed by 2022, with Amazon and other major tenants occupying space shortly thereafter.

Hollywood Burbank Airport is also an important component of the local economy, supporting more than 2,300 jobs and generating revenue for the city through property, parking and sales taxes. The airport is undergoing a major modernization program centered on a new 355,000-square-foot passenger terminal, scheduled to open in October 2026. The new $1.3-billion terminal will replace the existing facility while retaining the airport's 14-gate limit. The project has created hundreds of construction and related jobs and is intended to support continued economic development in Burbank's Airport District and surrounding commercial areas.

=== Top employers ===
According to the city's 2024 Annual Comprehensive Financial Report, the top employers in the city are:

#	Employer	# of employees
1	Warner Bros. Discovery	10,890
2	The Walt Disney Company	10,000
3	Hollywood Burbank Airport	2,734
4	Providence Saint Joseph Medical Center	2,574
5	Burbank Unified School District	2,200
6	City of Burbank Government	1,557
7	Nickelodeon Animation Studio	895
8	Netflix	850
9	Cast & Crew	727
10	Deluxe Shared Services	611

=== Shopping ===
The revitalized downtown Burbank provides an urban mix of shopping, dining, and entertainment. The San Fernando Strip is an exclusive mall designed to be a modern urban village, with apartments above the mall. An upscale shopping district is located in the state-of-the-art Empire Center neighborhood. The Burbank Town Center is a retail complex adjacent to the downtown core that was built in two phases between 1991 and 1992.

In 1979, the Burbank Redevelopment Agency entered into an agreement with San Diego–based Ernest Hahn Company to build a regional mall known as Media City Center. It would later get renamed Burbank Town Center and undergo a $130 million facelift starting in 2004, including a new exterior streetscape façade. The agency, helped out with its powers of eminent domain, spent $52 million to buy up the 41-acre (170,000 m^{2}) land in the area bounded by the Golden State Freeway, Burbank Boulevard, Third Street and Magnolia Boulevard.

Original plans were for Media City Center included four anchor tenants, including a J.W. Robinson's. But May Co. Department Stores later bought the parent company of Robinson's and dropped out of the deal. The other stores then dropped out as well and Hahn and the agency dropped the project in March 1987. Within months, Burbank entered into negotiations with the Walt Disney Company for a shopping mall and office complex to be called the "Disney MGM Backlot". Disney had estimated that it could spend $150 million to $300 million on a complex of shops, restaurants, theaters, clubs and hotel, and had offered to move its animation department and Disney Channel cable network operation to the property as well. These plans ended in failure in February 1988 when Disney executives determined that the costs were too high.

In January 1989, Burbank began Media City Center project negotiations with two developers, the Alexander Haagen Co. of Manhattan Beach and Price Kornwasser Associates of San Diego. Eight months later, Haagen won the contract and commenced construction, leading to the $250 million mall's opening in August 1991. Under terms of the agreement with Haagen, the city funded an $18 million parking garage and made between $8 and $12 million in improvements to the surrounding area. Plans by Sheraton Corporation to build a 300-room hotel at the mall were shelved because of the weak economy.

The new mall helped take the strain off Burbank's troubled economy, which had been hard hit by the departure of several large industrial employers, including Lockheed Corp. The center was partially financed with $50 million in city redevelopment funds. Construction had been in doubt for many years by economic woes and political turmoil since it was first proposed in the late 1970s. In 2003, Irvine-based Crown Realty & Development purchased the 1,200,000-square-foot (110,000 m^{2}) Burbank Town Center from Pan Pacific Retail Properties for $111 million. Crown then hired General Growth Properties Inc., a Chicago-based real estate investment trust, for property management and leasing duties. At the time, the Burbank mall ranked as the No. 6 retail center in Los Angeles County in terms of leasable square footage, with estimated combined tenant volumes in excess of $240 million.

In 1994, Lockheed selected Chicago-based Homart Development Company as the developer of a retail center on a former Lockheed P-38 Lightning production facility near the Burbank Airport that was subject to a major toxic clean-up project. A year later, Lockheed merged with Martin Marietta to become Lockheed Martin Corp. Lockheed was ordered to clean up the toxics as part of a federal Superfund site. The northern Burbank area also became identified as the San Fernando Valley's hottest toxic spot in 1989 by the South Coast Air Quality Management District, with Lockheed identified among major contributors. Lockheed always maintained the site was never a health risk to the community.

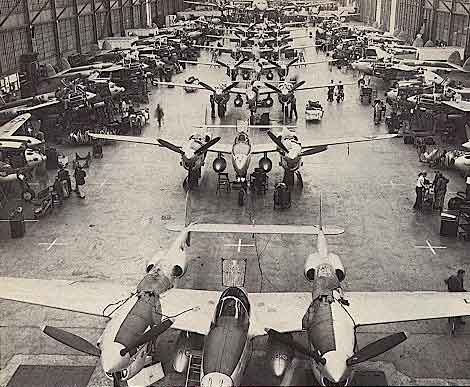
Lockheed P-38 Lightning production line in Burbank. The site is now the location of Burbank Empire Center.

The Lockheed toxic clean-up site, just east of the Golden State Freeway, later became home to the Empire Center. Four developers competed to be selected to build the $300 million outdoor mall on the site. In 1999, Lockheed picked Los Angeles-based Zelman Cos. from among other contenders to create the retail-office complex on a 103-acre (0.42 km^{2}) site. Zelman purchased the land in 2000 for around $70 million. As part of the sales agreement, Lockheed carried out extensive soil vapor removal on the site. Lockheed had manufactured planes on the site from 1928 to 1991. Together with $42 million for demolition and $12 million for site investigation, Lockheed would eventually spend $115 million on the project.

Warner Bros. proposed building a sports arena there for the Kings and the Clippers on the former B-1 bomber plant site. Price Club wanted it for a new store. Disney considered moving some operations there too. The city used the site in its failed attempt to lure DreamWorks to Burbank. Phoenix-based Vestar Development Company planned a major retail development and spent more than a year in negotiations to buy the property from Lockheed before pulling out late in 1998.

Less than eight months after breaking ground, the Empire Center's first stores opened in October 2001. Local officials estimated the complex would generate about $3.2 million a year in sales tax revenue for the city, and as many as 3,500 local jobs. Within a year of completion, the Empire Center was helping the city to post healthy growth in sales tax revenues despite a down economy. Alone, the Empire mall generated close to $800,000 in sales tax revenues in the second quarter of 2002. The outdoor mall's buildings hark back to Lockheed's glory days by resembling manufacturing plants. Each of the outdoor signs features a replica of a Lockheed aircraft, while the mall design brings to mind an airport, complete with a miniature control tower.

In 2009, work was finished on a $130-million office project adjacent to the Empire Center. The completion of the seven-story tower marked the final phase of the mixed-use Empire development near Bob Hope Airport.

In late 2012, IKEA announced plans to relocate to a new site in Burbank. Its original location was situated north of the Burbank Town Center mall. The new location was approved by the city in 2014 and is just north of Alameda Avenue and east of the Golden State Freeway. The new 456,000-square-foot store was completed in February 2017, and when it opened was the largest IKEA in the United States.

The old IKEA site north of the mall had been announced to get its own makeover back in 2018, featuring residential and retail space. The redevelopment reportedly includes using some of the land just north of the old IKEA site, including the Office Max location. In 2023, the building was sold to an undisclosed buyer, along with the nearby Office Max.

== Government ==
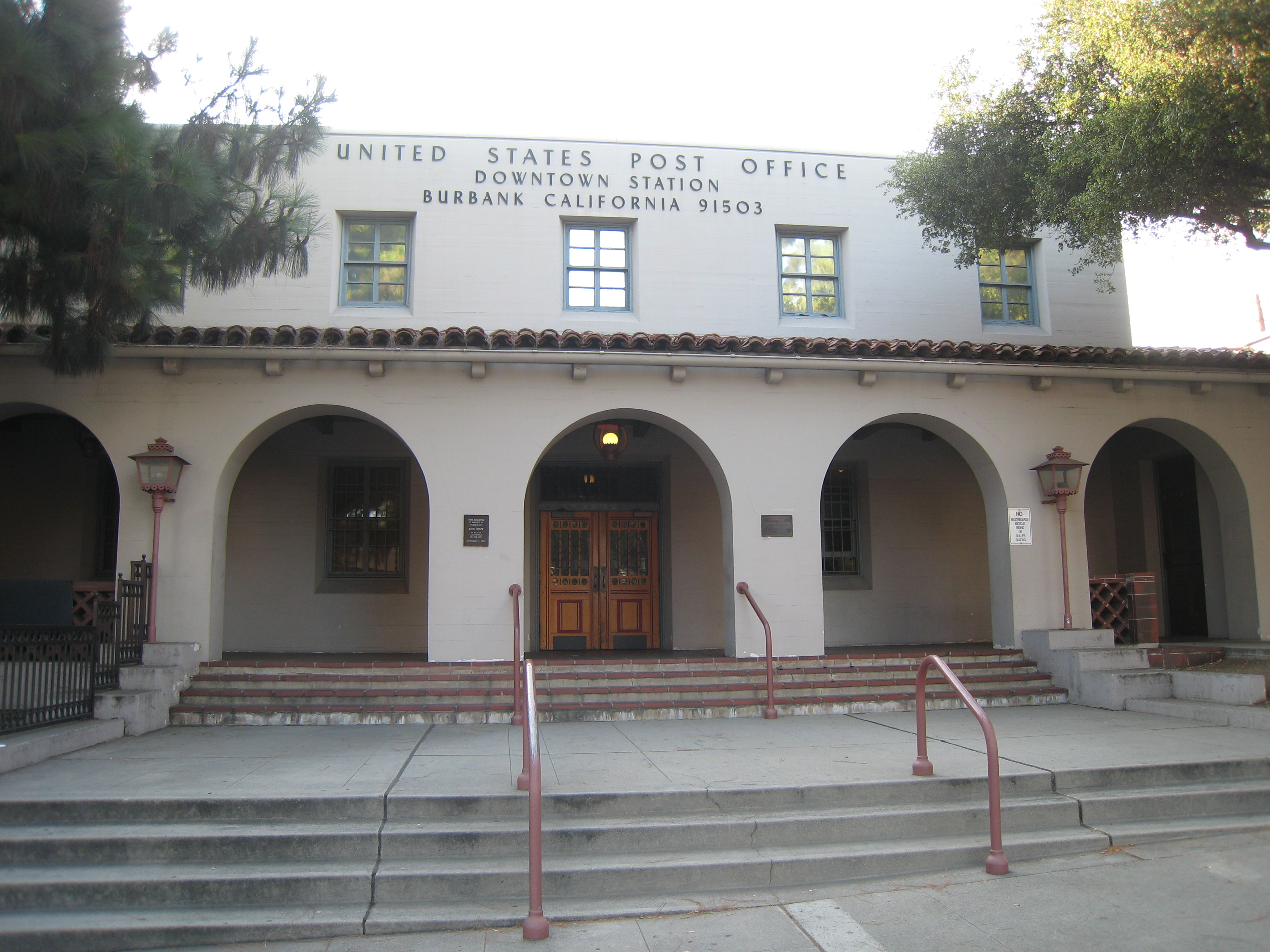
Downtown Burbank Post Office, built in a Mission Revival style 1937–38

Burbank is a charter city which operates under a council–manager form of government. In 1927, voters approved the council–manager form of government. The five-member City Council is elected for four-year overlapping terms, with the Mayor appointed annually from among the council. The City Clerk and the City Treasurer are also elected officials.

Burbank is a full-service, independent city, with offices of the City Manager and City Attorney, and departments of Community Development, Financial Services, Fire, Information Technology, Library Services, Management Services, Police, Parks-Recreation & Community Services, Public Works, and Burbank Water and Power (BWP).

Burbank opened its first library in 1913 as a contracted branch of the Los Angeles County Library. In 1938, the Burbank Public Library began operation separately from the county as a city department. Today, the Burbank Public Library operates three locations: the Central Library, Buena Vista Branch Library and Northwest Branch Library. In March 2020, the COVID-19 pandemic caused normal life to come to a standstill. The staff at Burbank Public Library adapted and transitioned services to meet the new circumstances. They implemented curbside pickup and virtual programming to connect the community and provide access to resources. They also provided homework help for students and ensured that all students had access to online resources.

In October 2025, the city launched the planning and design process for a new Central Library and Public Plaza to replace its existing 60-year-old downtown facility. The project, supported by a $9.95 million grant from the California State Library, is envisioned as a sustainable, modern hub focused on education, workforce development, and technology training. Community engagement and vision refinement for the state-of-the-art facility and adjacent public space are scheduled to continue through 2026.

The first power was distributed within the city limits of Burbank in 1913, supplied then by Southern California Edison Company. Today, the city-owned BWP serves 45,000 households and 6,000 businesses in Burbank with water and electricity. Additionally, the $382-million annual revenue utility offers fiber optic services. Burbank's city garbage pickup service began in 1920; outhouses were banned in 1922.

Most of Burbank's current power comes from the Magnolia Power Project, a 310-megawatt natural gas-fired combined cycle generating plant located on Magnolia Boulevard near the Interstate 5 freeway. The municipal power plant, jointly owned by six Southern California cities (Burbank, Glendale, Anaheim. Pasadena, Colton, and Cerritos), began generating electricity in 2005. It replaced a 1941 facility that had served the customers of Burbank for almost 60 years.

At the height of California's 2001 energy crisis, BWP unveiled a mini-power plant at its landfill. It marked the world's first commercial landfill power plant using Capstone microturbine technology. Ten microturbines run on landfill gas, producing 300 kilowatts of renewable energy for Burbank. That is enough energy to serve the daily needs of about 250 homes. The landfill is located in the Verdugo Mountains in the northeastern portion of the city. In 2015, Burbank reached its 2007 goal of providing 33% renewable energy to the city five years ahead of schedule. As of 2017, the city was getting 35% of its power from renewables.

Like other cities in California, Burbank has a long history of facing drought conditions and water cutbacks mandated by the state. In September 2021, as the drought worsened, Burbank proactively moved to Stage II in an effort to comply with the governor's challenge to reduce water use by 15% from 2020 levels. Despite these efforts, the drought continued to worsen, and by June 2022, Burbank was forced to adopt Stage III of their Sustainable Water Use Ordinance. With heavy rains in January 2023, the drought conditions eased, even though Burbank remains 100% dependent on imported water purchased from the Metropolitan Water District of Southern California. The Sustainable Water Use Ordinance sets specific targets for water conservation and requires businesses and residents to comply with certain water-saving measures.

According to Burbank Water and Power, over the last 10 to 15 years, Burbank residents have successfully decreased their water consumption by 22%, from 170 gallons per person to 132 gallons per person. Previously, the 2015 drought in Burbank lasted for several years and led to a reduced water supply for the city and its residents, causing a focus on water conservation and the long-term sustainability of the area's water resources. Burbank was required to lower water use by 28% of 2013 levels. The state threatened stiff fines for non-compliance.

The Burbank City Council lost a court case in 2000 involving the right to begin meetings with a sectarian prayer. A Los Angeles County Superior Court judge ruled that prayers referencing specific religions violated the principle of separation of church and state in the First Amendment. While invocations were still allowed, Burbank officials were required to advise all clerics that sectarian prayer as part of Council meetings was not permitted under the Constitution.

In 1977, Californians passed Proposition 13, a property tax initiative, and Burbank and other cities in the state soon experienced constrained revenues. Burbank dealt with the ramifications of maintaining service levels expected by the community but still with impacts on city finances. As a result, Burbank officials opted to cut some services and implement user fees for specialized services and residents in special zoned areas. One fee was an equine license fee for owners of horse property, even if they no longer owned a horse just to keep from losing their rural zoning.

The United States Postal Service (USPS) operates the Burbank Downtown Post Office. Previously the USPS also operated the Glenoaks Post Office in Burbank. Due to area businesses getting postal services, traffic at Glenoaks declined and in 2011 the USPS began considering closing the branch. In 2013 the agency announced that it will close that branch. Congressperson Adam Schiff opposed the closure. The closure occurred in 2014. The USPS hoped to save $740,270 over a ten-year period from the closure. Burbank Downtown absorbed the functions of Glenoaks.

=== City Hall ===
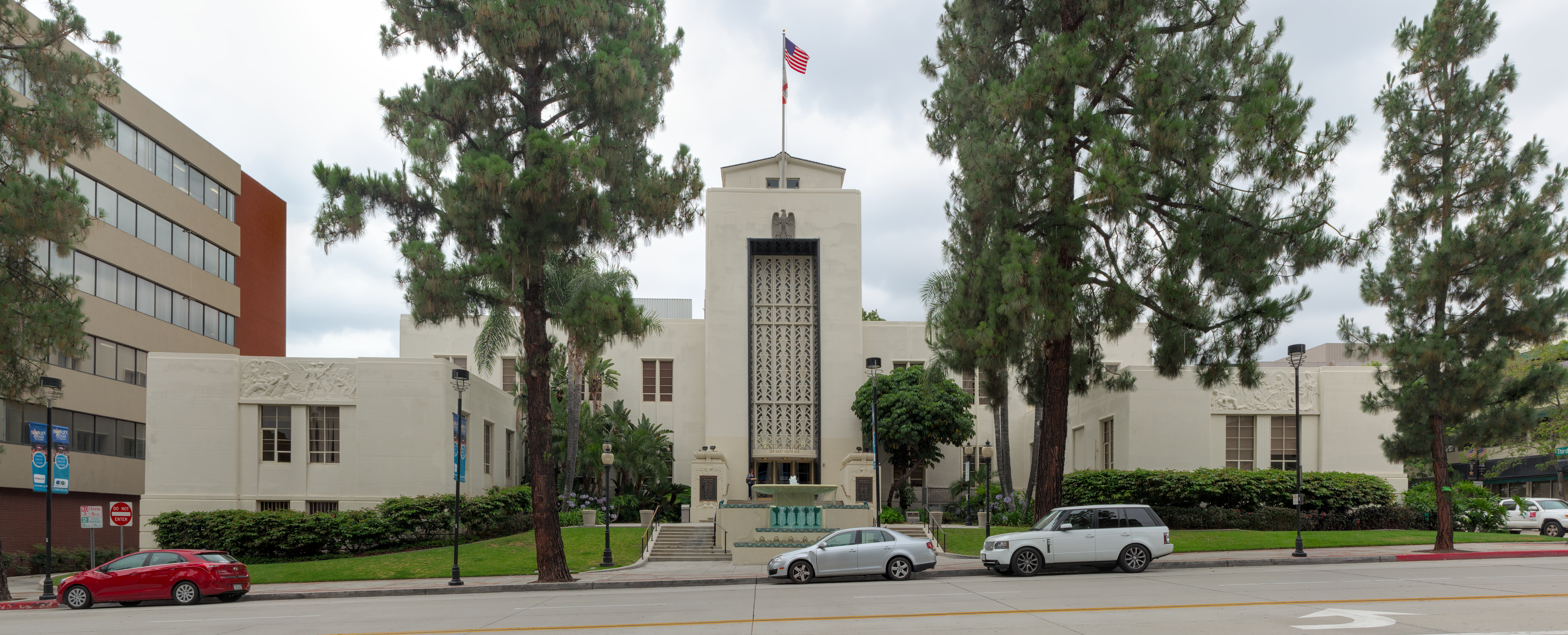
Burbank City Hall

In 1916, the original Burbank City Hall was constructed after bonds were issued to finance the project and pay for fire apparatus. Burbank's current City Hall was constructed from 1941 to 1942 in a neo-federalist Moderne style popular in the late Depression era. The structure was built at a total cost of $409,000, with funding from the Federal Works Agency and Works Project Administration programs. City Hall was designed by architects William Allen and W. George Lutzi and completed in 1943.

Originally, the City Hall building housed all city services, including the police and fire departments, an emergency medical ward, a courthouse and a jail. One of the most distinctive features of the cream-colored concrete building is its 77-foot (23 m) tower, which serves as the main lobby. The lobby interior features more than 20 types of marble, which can be found in the city seal on the floor, the trim, walls and in the treads and risers of the grand stairway. Artist Hugo Ballin created a "Four Freedoms" mural in Burbank's City Council chambers during World War II, although it was covered up for decades until art aficionados convinced the city to have the mural fully revealed. Ballin's work illustrates the "Four Freedoms" outlined in President Franklin Roosevelt's 1941 speech at the signing of the Atlantic Charter.

In 1996, the City Hall was added to the U.S. National Register of Historic Places, becoming the second building in Burbank to be listed on the register. The first was Burbank's main post office just blocks away from City Hall on Olive Avenue. In 1998, Burbank's state-of-the-art Police/Fire facility opened.

=== County representation ===
In the Los Angeles County Board of Supervisors, Burbank is in the Fifth District, represented by Kathryn Barger.

The Los Angeles County Department of Health Services operates the Glendale Health Center in Glendale, serving Burbank.

=== State and federal representation ===
In the state legislature, Burbank is in the 20th senatorial district, represented by Democrat Caroline Menjivar, and in the 44th Assembly district, represented by Democrat Nick Schultz. In the United States Senate, Burbank is represented by California's senators Alex Padilla and Adam Schiff, both Democrats.

=== United States Congress ===
Burbank is completely enclosed in the US 30th congressional district since 2023. This district has been represented by Adam Schiff until December 2024, and Laura Friedman beginning January 2025. From 2013 to 2023, nearly the entire city was part of the 28th congressional district; some of western Burbank was excluded and part of the 30th congressional district. Adam Schiff represented the 28th, while the 30th was Brad Sherman. From 2003 to 2013, Burbank was split into two congressional districts, the 27th (western side) and the 29th (eastern side). The 27th was represented by Brad Sherman, while the 29th was represented by Adam Schiff.

From 1993 to 2003, Burbank was entirely contained in the 27th congressional district. Burbank's representatives were Carlos Moorhead (1993–1997), James E. Rogan (1997–2001), and Adam Schiff (2001–2003). From 1983 to 1993, Burbank was split between the 22nd and 26th congressional districts. The 22nd was represented by Carlos Moorhead, while the 26th was represented by Howard Berman.

From 1973 to 1983, Burbank was split into the 26th district (southern Burbank), the 24th district (north western Burbank), and the 20th district (north eastern Burbank). The 26th district was represented by Thomas M. Rees (1973–1975) and John H. Rousselot (1975–1983); the 24th district was represented by John H. Rousselot (1973–1975), and Henry Waxman (1975–1983); and the 20th district by Carlos Moorhead (1973–1975), and Barry Goldwater, Jr. (1975–1983). From 1963 to 1973, Burbank was split between the 20th (eastern Burbank), 27th (western Burbank), and the 28th (southern Burbank). The 20th district was represented by H. Allen Smith; 27th by Everett G. Burkhalter (1963–1965), Edwin Reinecke (1965–1969), and Barry Goldwater, Jr. (1969–1973). The 28th district was represented by Alphonzo E. Bell, Jr.

From 1953 to 1963, Burbank was split between the 21st (most of populated Burbank) and the 20th (some of eastern Burbank and the unpopulated Verdugo Hills). The 20th was represented by John Carl Hinshaw (1953–1956) and H. Allen Smith (1957–1963); the 21st was represented by Edgar W. Hiestand. From 1943 to 1953, Burbank was wholly enclosed in the 20th district, and was represented by John Carl Hinshaw. From 1933 to 1943, Burbank was wholly enclosed in the 11th district, and was represented by William E. Evans (1933–1935), John S. McGroarty (1935–1939), and John Carl Hinshaw (1939–1943).

From 1913 (just after cityhood) to 1933, Burbank was in the 9th district. It was represented by Charles W. Bell (1913–1915), Charles Hiram Randall (1915–1921), Walter F. Lineberger (1921–1927), and William E. Evans (1927–1933).

=== State Senate Districts ===
From 1911 to 1967, Los Angeles County (including Burbank) had a single state senator for the 38th district.

The district was represented by H. S. G. McCartney (1911), Leslie R. Hewitt (1911–1915), John W. Ballard (1915–1919), Henry H. Yonkin (1919–1923), Charles H. V. Lewis (1923–1927), J. W. McKinley (1927–1935), Culbert Olson (1935–1939), Robert W. Kenny (1939–1943), Jack Tenney (1943–1955), Richard B. Richards (1955–1963), Thomas M. Rees (1963–1965). The district was unrepresented between 1965 and 1967.

In 1967, the State legislature was required to redistrict the State Senate. After this 1967 redistricting, Burbank was partially in the 20th, 21st, and 22nd state senate districts. The 20th was represented by William E. Coombs. The 21st by John L. Harmer. The 22nd by Tom C. Carrell.

After the 1971 redistricting, Burbank was partially in the 21st, 22nd, and 23rd state senate districts. The 21st was represented by John L. Harmer (1971–1974) and Newton Russell (1974–1981). The 22nd was represented by Tom C. Carrell (1971–1972), Alan Robbins (1973–1974), Anthony Beilenson (1974–1977), and Alan Sieroty (1977–1981). The 23rd was represented by Lou Cusanovich (1971–1976), and David Roberti (1976–1981).

After the 1981 redistricting, Burbank was in the 23rd state senate district. Burbank was represented by David Roberti. After the 1992 redistricting, Burbank was in the 21st state senate district. Burbank was represented by Newton Russell (1991–1996), and Adam Schiff (1996–2000), and Jack Scott (2000–2008). After the 2001 redistricting, Burbank was in the 21st state senate district. Burbank was represented by Carol Liu (2008–2011).

After the 2011 redistricting, Burbank was partially in the 18th and 25th state senate districts. The 18th was represented by Jean Fuller (2011–2014) and Robert Hertzberg (2014–2021). The 25th was represented by Roderick Wright (2011–2012), Carol Liu (2012–2016), Anthony Portantino (2016–2021). After the 2021 redistricting, Burbank was in the 20th state senate district.

== Education ==
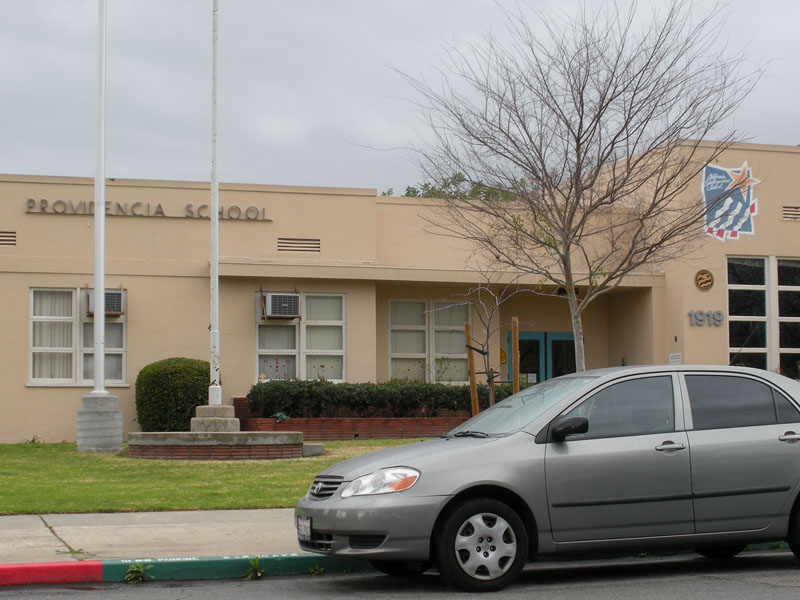
Providencia School

Burbank is within the Burbank Unified School District. The district was formed on June 3, 1879, following a petition filed by residents S.W. White and nine other citizens. First named the Providencia School District, Burbank's district started with one schoolhouse built for $400 on a site donated by Dr. Burbank, the area's single largest landholder. The first schoolhouse, a single redwood-sided building serving nine families, is on what is now Burbank Boulevard near Mariposa Street. In 1887, a new schoolhouse was constructed at San Fernando Boulevard and Magnolia Boulevard, which was in Burbank's center of commerce.

In 1908, citizens passed a bond measure to raise money to build a high school. At the time, Burbank-area high school students were attending schools in Glendale. When it opened on September 14, 1908, the original Burbank High School had 42 students and two instructors.

Burbank is home to several California Distinguished Schools including the Luther Burbank Middle School and Dolores Huerta Middle School. Both its public and private K–12 schools routinely score above state and national average test scores. According to U.S. News Best High Schools rankings, the district contains three schools that received gold, silver or bronze medals in the publication's latest rankings.

The largest university in Burbank is Woodbury University. Woodbury has a number of undergraduate and graduate programs, including business, architecture, and several design programs. A number of smaller colleges are also located in Burbank, including several makeup and beauty trade schools serving the entertainment industry.

During the early 1920s, Burbank was a contender to become the location for the southern branch of the University of California. Planners were considering locating the university in the Ben Mar Hills area near Amherst Drive and San Fernando Boulevard. The seaside community of Rancho Palos Verdes was also considered for the campus. Both sites were eventually bypassed when the Janss Investment Company donated property now known as Westwood to build the University of California, Los Angeles.

PUC Schools, a Los Angeles charter school, has its administrative offices in Burbank. The schools are all located outside of Burbank.

In April 2012, Lycee International de Los Angeles, a bilingual French American college preparatory school, submitted an application with the city of Burbank to operate a private school for grades 6–12 on the site of the former General Motors Training Center on Riverside Drive. The school opened in August 2013 and now features 23 classrooms.

== Media ==
Burbank Leader is a weekly newspaper. The newswebsite Myburbank caters exclusively to the Burbank community.

== Infrastructure ==
=== Transportation ===
==== Air ====
The Hollywood Burbank Airport, until late 2017 known as Bob Hope Airport, serves over 4 million travelers per year with six major carriers and over 70 flights daily. The airport, located in the northwestern corner of the city, is the source of most street traffic in the city. Noise from the airport has been a source of concern for nearly decades. There was even a report in 2018 that a new satellite air-traffic control system may be responsible for some of the noise by putting jets on a path that includes certain neighborhoods. A bill introduced in May 2013 by two California congressmen would put into law an overnight curfew on flights from 10 p.m. to 7 a.m. The U.S. Federal Aviation Administration had rejected the airports' applications for a curfew. However, the airport still suggests a voluntary curfew of 10 p.m. to 7 a.m., where airlines are strongly encouraged not to schedule any arrivals or departures, to respect the surrounding neighborhoods.

In December 2008, a slowdown in passenger traffic led the Burbank-Glendale-Pasadena Airport Authority to curtail spending plans, including deferring multimillion-dollar construction projects. The weak economy continued to affect the airport in 2010, with figures showing a 6% decline in passengers for the fiscal year ending June 30. The slowdown is one reason the airport authority scrapped plans to spend $4 million to erect barriers at the west end of the runway. In 2000, a Southwest Airlines Boeing 737 flight with 142 persons aboard overshot the runway and went through the east fence, coming to a stop on Hollywood Way near a Chevron gas station.

==== Roads and highways ====
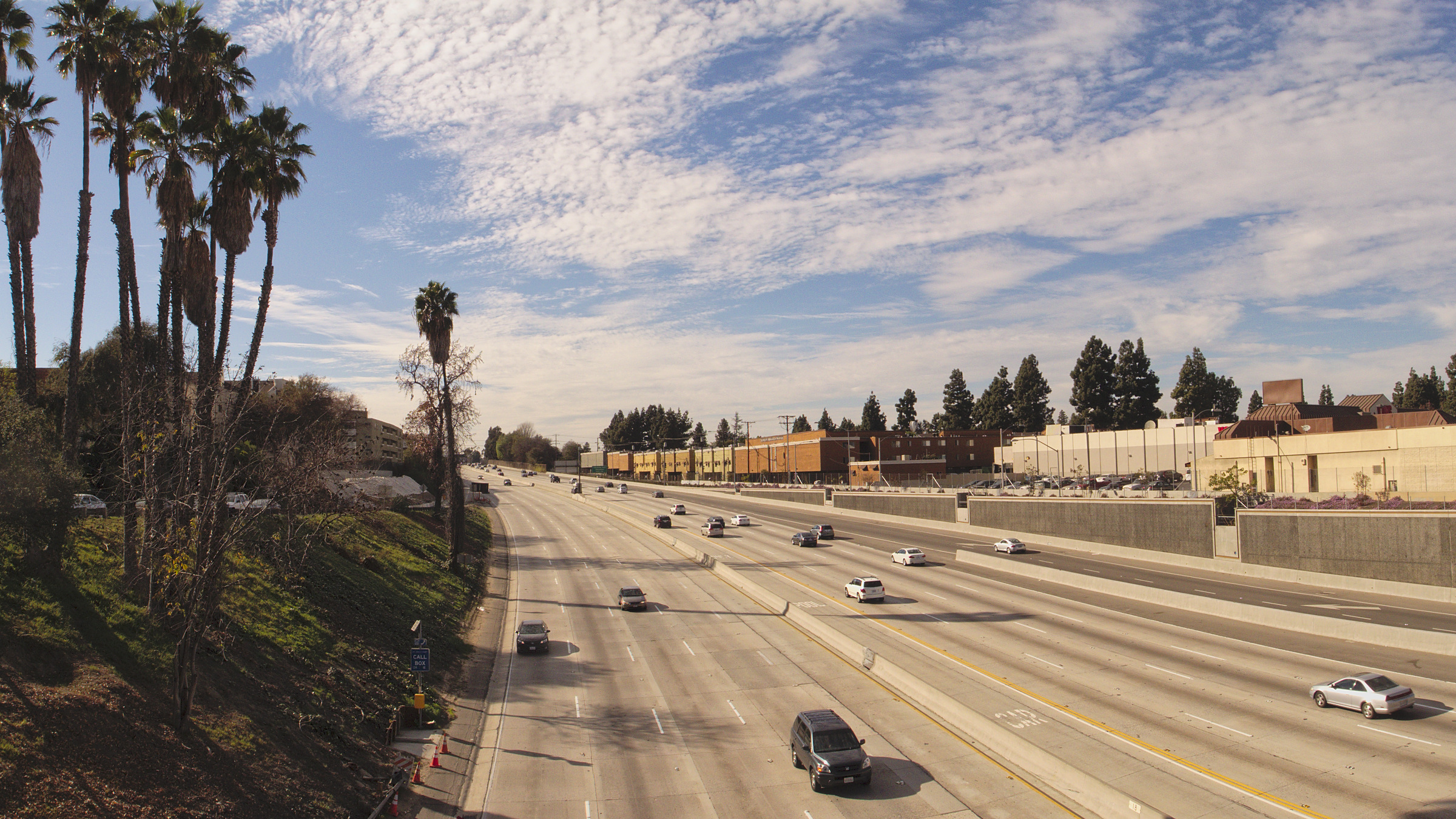
SR 134 Ventura Freeway at Pass Avenue in Burbank

The construction of major freeways through and around the city of Burbank starting in the 1950s both divided the city from itself and linked it to the rapidly growing Los Angeles region. Burbank is easily accessible by and can easily access the Southern California freeways via the Golden State Freeway (I-5), which bisects the city from northwest to southeast, and the Ventura Freeway which connects Burbank to U.S. Route 101 on the south and the nearby Foothill Freeway to the east. The Ventura Freeway was completed in 1960.

In May 2012, the state Transportation Commission approved $224.1 million in funding for the improvements to the Golden State Freeway (I-5) in the Burbank area along with safety improvements to the railroad tracks at Buena Vista Street. The allocation will fund most of the effort to build a new interchange at Empire Avenue, giving greater access to the nearby Empire Center shopping center as it prepares to get a Walmart store. Construction is expected to start in early 2013 and be completed in early 2016 with an estimated cost of $452 million. The state-backed project will include elevating the railroad crossing at Buena Vista Street to prevent people from getting in harm's way when a train is coming. The crossing has been the site of at least two fatalities in recent years.

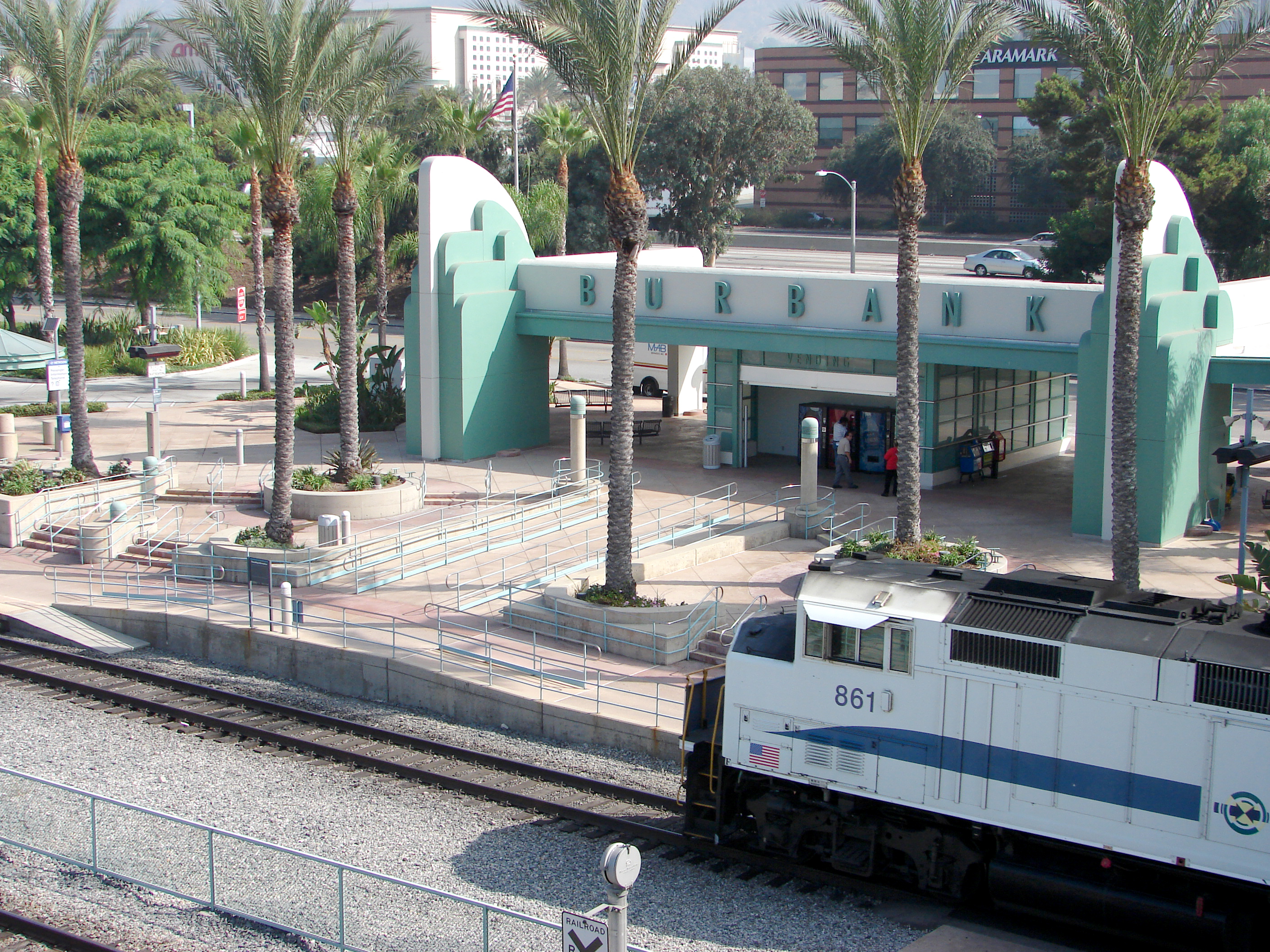
Downtown Burbank train station

Burbank contains about 227.5 miles (366.1 km) of streets, nearly 50 miles (80 km) of paved alleys, 365.3 miles (587.9 km) of sidewalks, 181 signalized intersections and 10 intersections with flashing signals, according to city figures. Many of the current signals date back to the late 1960s, when voters passed a major capital improvement program for street beautification and street lighting. The funding also helped upgrade dated park and library facilities. The Burbank Chandler Bike Path is popular with cyclist and pedestrians alike.

==== Transit ====
Metro operates public transport throughout Los Angeles County, including Burbank. Commuters can use Metrolink and Amtrak for service south into Downtown, west to Ventura and north to Palmdale and beyond. Burbank has three rail stations: Burbank Airport–North station, served by the Antelope Valley Line, Burbank Airport–South station, served by the Ventura County Line, and the Amtrak Pacific Surfliner, and Downtown Burbank station, served by both Metrolink lines but not Amtrak. Burbank has its own public transportation system known as the Burbank Bus. In 2006, Burbank opened its first hydrogen fueling station for automobiles.

The projected California High-Speed Rail route will pass through the city and include a stop near Burbank. The train will connect the San Francisco area to Los Angeles, traveling at speeds up to 220 mph (350 km/h) at some points.

=== Public safety ===
==== Fire department ====
At the time of cityhood, Burbank had a volunteer fire department. Fire protection depended upon the bucket brigade and finding a hydrant. It wasn't until 1913 that the city created its own fire department. By 1916, the city was installing an additional 40 new fire hydrants but still relying on volunteers for fire fighting. In 1927, the city switched from a volunteer fire department to a professional one.

The department consists of six strategically located fire stations, consisting of 6 fire engines (type 1); 2 aerial ladder trucks (tractor-drawn) and 3 paramedic ambulances.

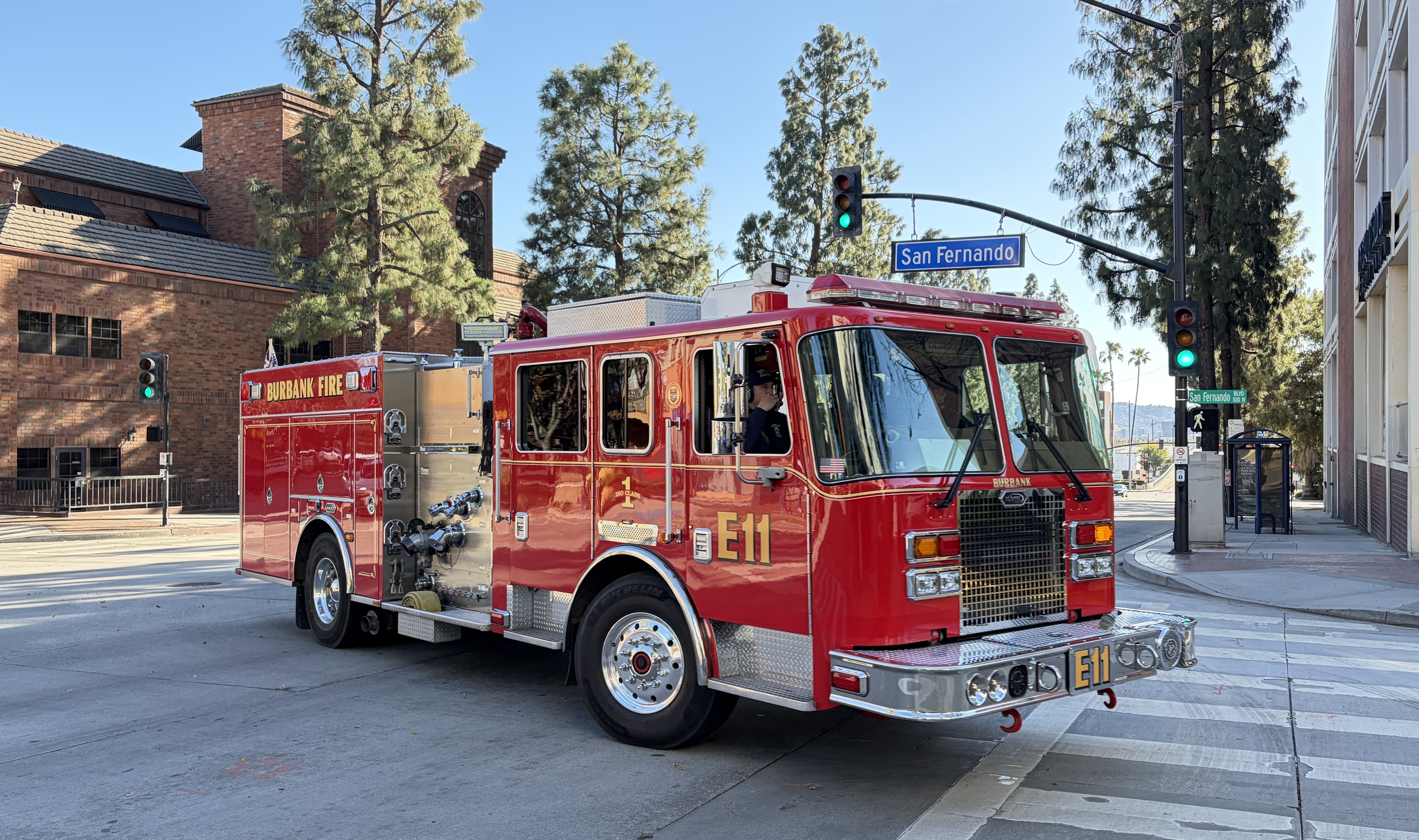
Burbank firefighting vehicle

In the late 1970s, Burbank became part of the Verdugo Fire Communications Center under a joint agreement with Glendale and Pasadena. All three cities were experiencing issues with fire dispatching at the time. Like a lot of cities, dispatching was done by law enforcement due to cost-effectiveness. A "tri-city" joint dispatching center was created to solve the issue and fill the void. Under the contract, Burbank provided a Hazardous Materials team, Glendale provided an Air-Light unit as well as the dispatch center, and Pasadena provided an Urban Search and Rescue (USAR) Type Heavy team. Today, both Glendale and Pasadena offer USAR Type 1 Heavy teams. The three city fire departments are all dispatched from the Verdugo Fire Communications Center, located in Glendale. Each of the three cities shares the cost of operating and maintaining this dispatch facility. Today, Verdugo is a regional dispatch center, providing communications for all 13 fire departments in California's OES "Area C" mutual aid area and the 14th agency which is the Burbank Airport Fire Department.

=== Hospitals ===
In 1907, Burbank's first major hospital opened under the name "Burbank Community Hospital". The 16-bed facility served the community during a deadly smallpox epidemic in 1913 and helped it brace for possible air raids at the start of World War II. The two-story hospital was located at Olive Avenue and Fifth Street. By 1925, the hospital was expanded to 50 beds and in the mid-1980s operated with 103 beds and a staff of over 175 physicians. For years, it also was the only hospital in Burbank where women could receive abortions, tubal ligations and other procedures not offered at what is now Providence St. Joseph Medical Center. A physicians group acquired the hospital for $2 million in 1990 and renamed it Thompson Memorial Medical Center, in honor of the hospital's founder, Dr. Elmer H. Thompson. He was a general practitioner who made house calls by bicycle and horseback. In 2001, Burbank Community Hospital was razed to make way for a Belmont Village Senior Living community. Proceeds from that sale went to the Burbank Health Care Foundation, which assists community organizations that cater to health-related needs.

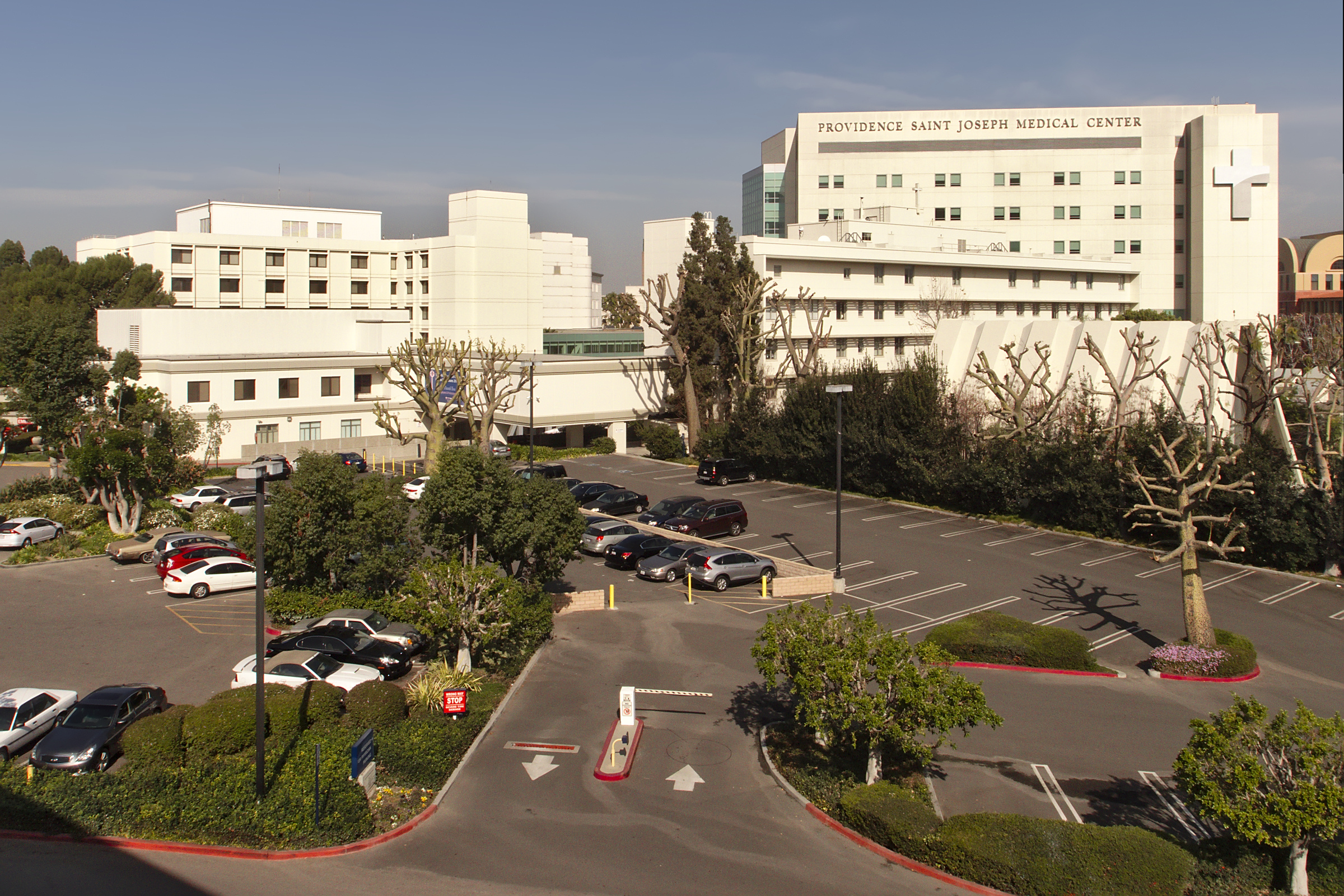
Providence Saint Joseph Medical Center in Burbank

In 1943, the Sisters of Providence Health System, a Catholic non-profit group, founded Providence St. Joseph Medical Center. Construction of the hospital proved difficult due to World War II restrictions on construction materials, and in particular the lack of structural steel. But the challenges were met and the one-story hospital was erected to deal with wartime restrictions. During the baby boom of the 1950s, the hospital expanded from the original 100 beds to 212. By 2012, the hospital featured 431 licensed beds and ranked as the second-largest hospital serving the San Fernando and Santa Clarita Valleys. The hospital employs about 2,500 employees and 600-plus physicians.

In the mid-1990s, Seattle-based Sisters of Providence Health System, which owns St. Joseph in Burbank, renamed the hospital Providence St. Joseph Medical Center. The medical center has several centers on campus with specialized disciplines. Cancer, cardiology, mammogram, hospice and children's services are some of the specialty centers. The newest addition to the medical center's offerings is the Roy and Patricia Disney Family Cancer Center, which opened in February 2010. The cancer center features four stories of the latest in high-tech equipment to treat cancer patients and provide wellness services. The center, estimated to cost in excess of $36 million, was built with money from the family of Roy E. Disney, the nephew of Walt Disney. Roy E. Disney died in December 2009 of stomach cancer.

== Notable people ==
List of people from Burbank, California

== Sister cities ==
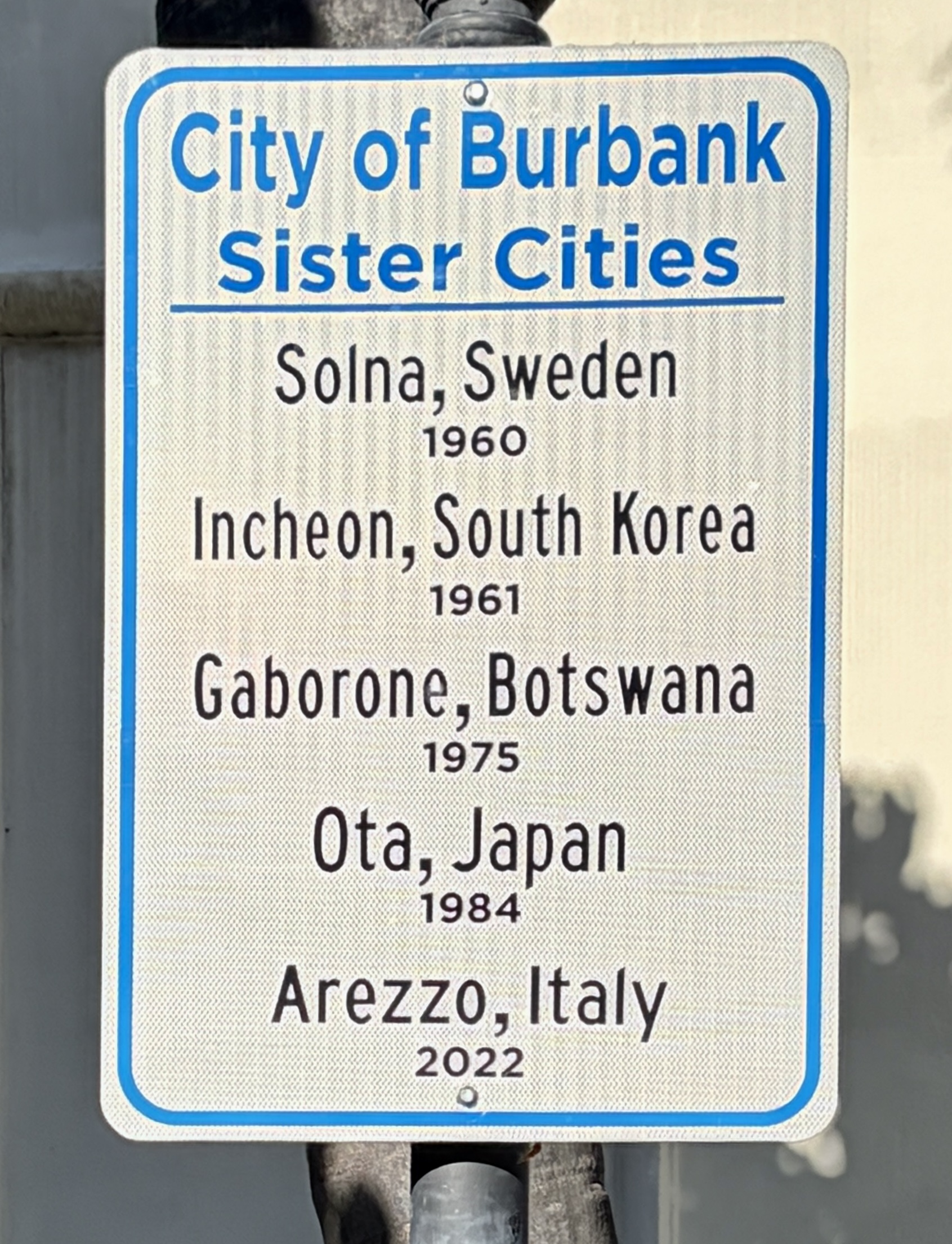
Sister cities sign at Burbank City Hall

Burbank is currently twinned with:

- Arezzo, Italy
- Gaborone, Botswana
- Incheon, South Korea
- Ōta, Japan
- Solna, Sweden

== See also ==
- List of sundown towns in the United States
