= Vineland Avenue =

Arterial road in Los Angeles's San Fernando Valley

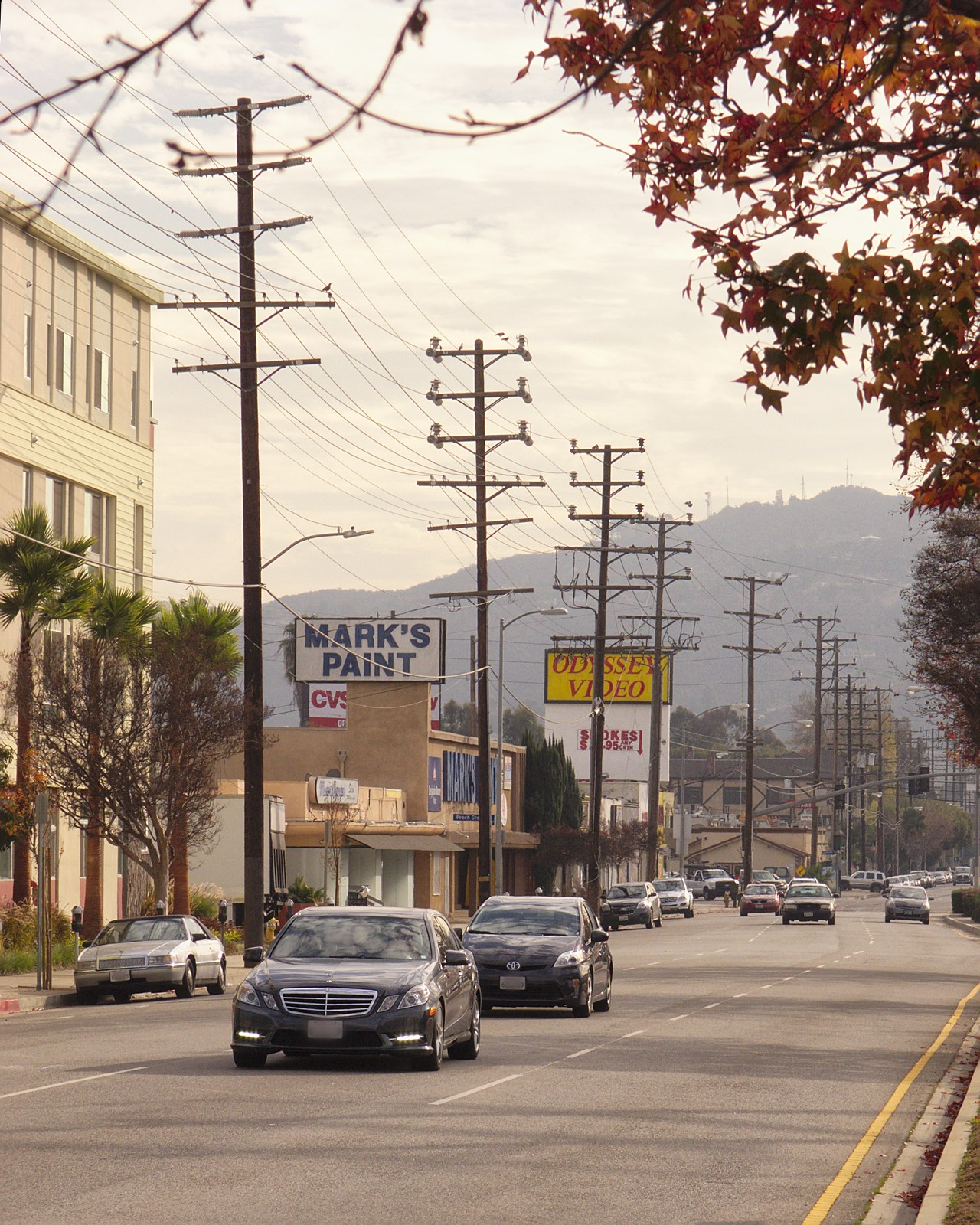
- Vineland Avenue north of Camarillo Street in North Hollywood, looking south towards the Hollywood Hills
- Maintained by: Los Angeles Department of Water and Power
- Length: 6 mi (9.7 km)
- South end: Lankershim Boulevard in Studio City
- Major junctions: US 101; SR 134; SR 170
- North end: San Fernando Road in Sun Valley

Vineland Avenue is a major north–south arterial road that runs for 6 miles (9.7 km) in the San Fernando Valley in Los Angeles, California.

== Route ==
From the north, Vineland begins as a small residential street north of the railroad tracks at San Fernando Road. It cuts at the tracks, then turns into an arterial road as a continuation of Sunland Boulevard south of San Fernando Road in Sun Valley. It runs north–south through Sun Valley, North Hollywood (including the NoHo Arts District), and Studio City, and provides access to the Hollywood and Ventura freeways in Studio City. Vineland ends south of Ventura Boulevard at Lankershim Boulevard in Studio City.

== Transportation ==
Vineland Avenue carries Metro Local lines 90 and 222; the former runs north of Magnolia Boulevard and the latter between Riverside Drive and Ventura Boulevard.

Two block-long parking lots connect Vineland to the North Hollywood station, serviced by the B and G lines. The Chandler Boulevard Bike Path also crosses Vineland and connects it to the North Hollywood station.

The North Hollywood to Pasadena Bus Rapid Transit Project plans to connect to the North Hollywood station, and also stop at Vineland and Hesby.

Vineland travels directly beside Hollywood Burbank Airport, with the runway terminating before reaching the street. The street however does not provide access to the airport.

== Landmarks ==
Notable landmarks on Vineland include (from north to south): Sun Valley Recreation Center, Hollywood Burbank Airport, Weddington House (Los Angeles Cultural-Historic Monument #883) and Idle Hour Café (Los Angeles Cultural-Historic Monument #977).

Schools on Vineland include East Valley High School and the Science Academy STEM Magnet, both of which share the same campus.
