= Phil's Diner =

Historic dining car in North Hollywood, California

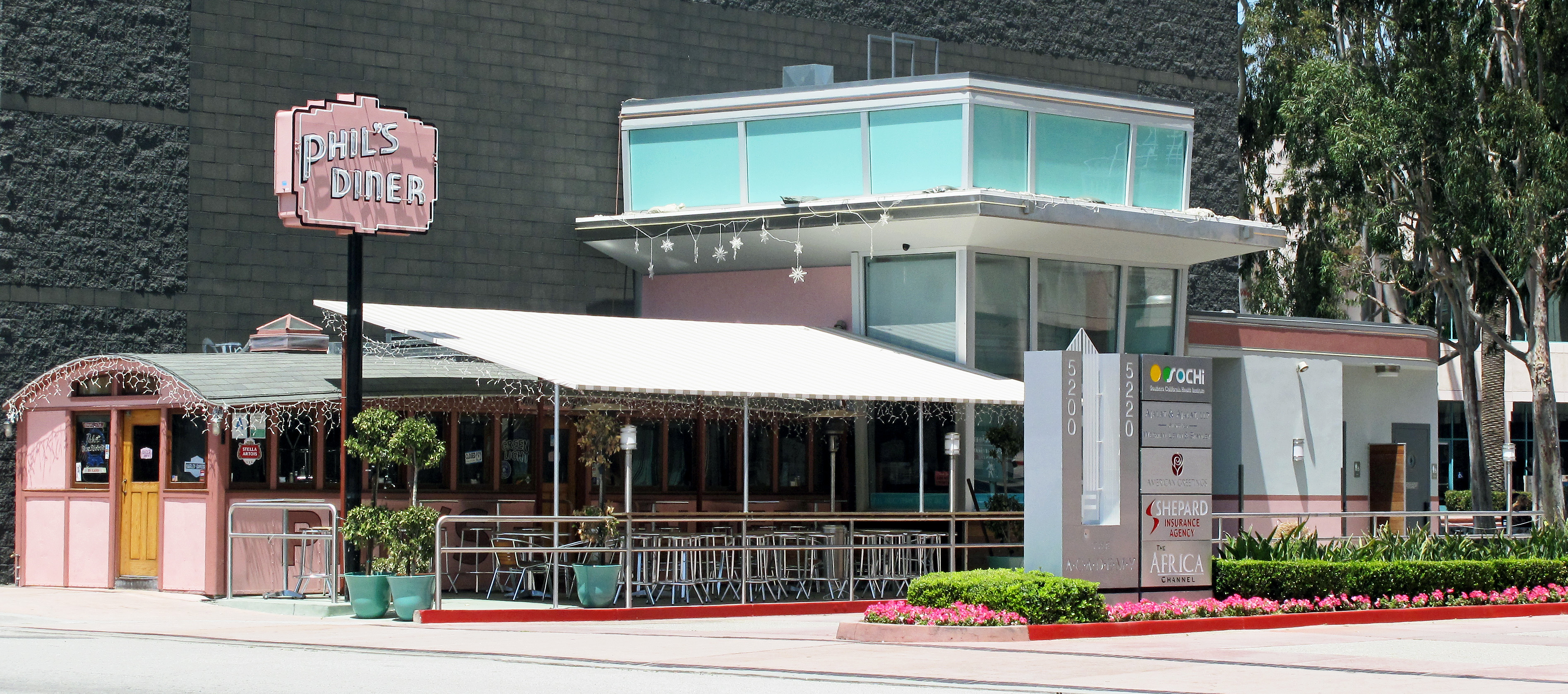
- The building in 2012
- Interactive map of the Phil's Diner area

General information
- Location: originally 11138 Chandler Boulevard, now 5230 Lankershim Boulevard, North Hollywood, California
- Coordinates: 34°9′56.57″N 118°22′29.72″W
- Completed: 1926
- Opened: 1928, 2011
- Relocated: 1998, 2010
- Renovated: 2010
- Closed: late 1990s, 2011

Design and construction
- Architect: Charles Amend

Phil's Diner is a historic dining car originally located at 11138 Chandler Boulevard and now at 5230 Lankershim Boulevard in North Hollywood, California. It is believed to be the oldest dining car in California.

== History ==
The Phil's Diner building was designed by Charles Amend and is believed to have been built by the Phillips Company in 1926. Originally located alongside the Lankershim Train Depot at 11138 Chandler Boulevard, Phil's Diner opened in the building in 1928.

Hollywood set decorator Casey Hallenbeck purchased the building in 1998, around the same time the diner had closed due to B Line construction. The building was then placed in storage for more than ten years, until it was moved to its new location at 5230 Lankershim Boulevard. Here it was restored under the supervision of Robert Chattel and reopened as Phil's Diner Fresh-n-Fast in 2011, only to close again later that year. The total cost for this undertaking was $1.1 million ($1.57 million in 2025), about 40% of which was paid for by the City of Los Angeles Community Redevelopment Agency.

Since Phil's Diner Fresh-n-Fast's closure, three additional restaurants have opened and closed in the building. A fourth restaurant opened in 2022.

== Architecture and design ==
Phil's Diner was designed using a replica railroad car and features a pink finish and a neon sign. The original sign was stolen, and so a new one was constructed based on photographs of the original when the building was restored before reopening in 2011.
