= Hard Rock Cafe, Hollywood =

Hard Rock Cafe, Hollywood may refer to:

- Hard Rock Cafe inside Seminole Hard Rock Hotel & Casino Hollywood
- Hard Rock Cafe at Universal CityWalk Hollywood a former Hard Rock Cafe
