= Lankershim Boulevard =

Thoroughfare in San Fernando Valley

- Namesake: Isaac Lankershim
- Maintained by: Local jurisdictions
- Length: 7.5 mi (12.1 km)
- Nearest metro station: : North Hollywood; Universal City/Studio City
- South end: Fredonia Drive in Studio City
- Major junctions: US 101 in Studio City; SR 134 in Toluca Lake; I-5 in Sun Valley
- North end: San Fernando Road in Sun Valley

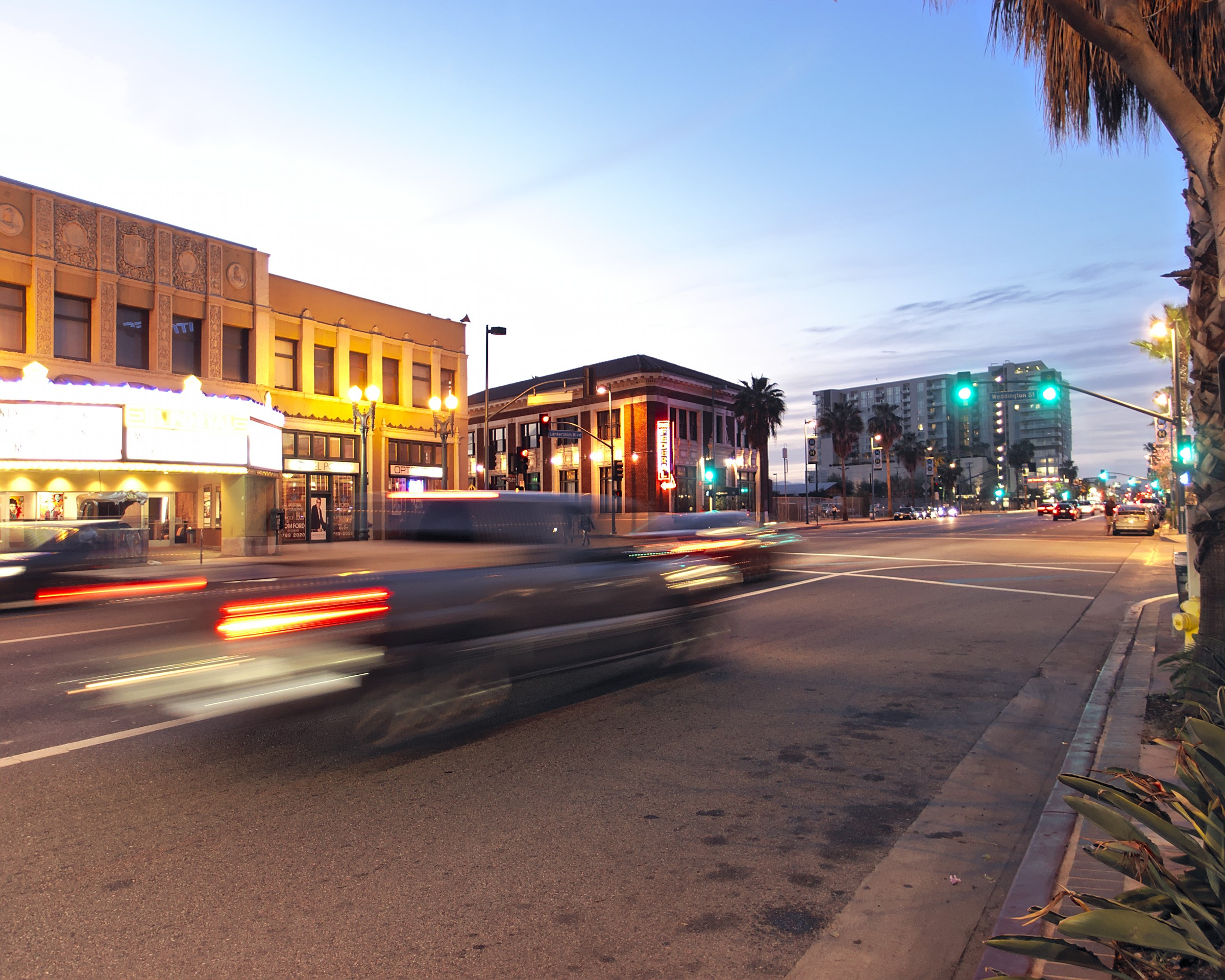
Looking northwest along Lankershim Boulevard in the NoHo Arts District of North Hollywood

Lankershim Boulevard is a major north–south arterial road that runs for 7.5 miles (12.1 km) in the eastern San Fernando Valley in the Los Angeles, California.

== Name ==
Lankershim Boulevard was named after the town of Lankershim, now known as North Hollywood, the town named after Isaac Lankershim whose Lankershim Ranch accounted for a large portion of the town.

== Geography ==
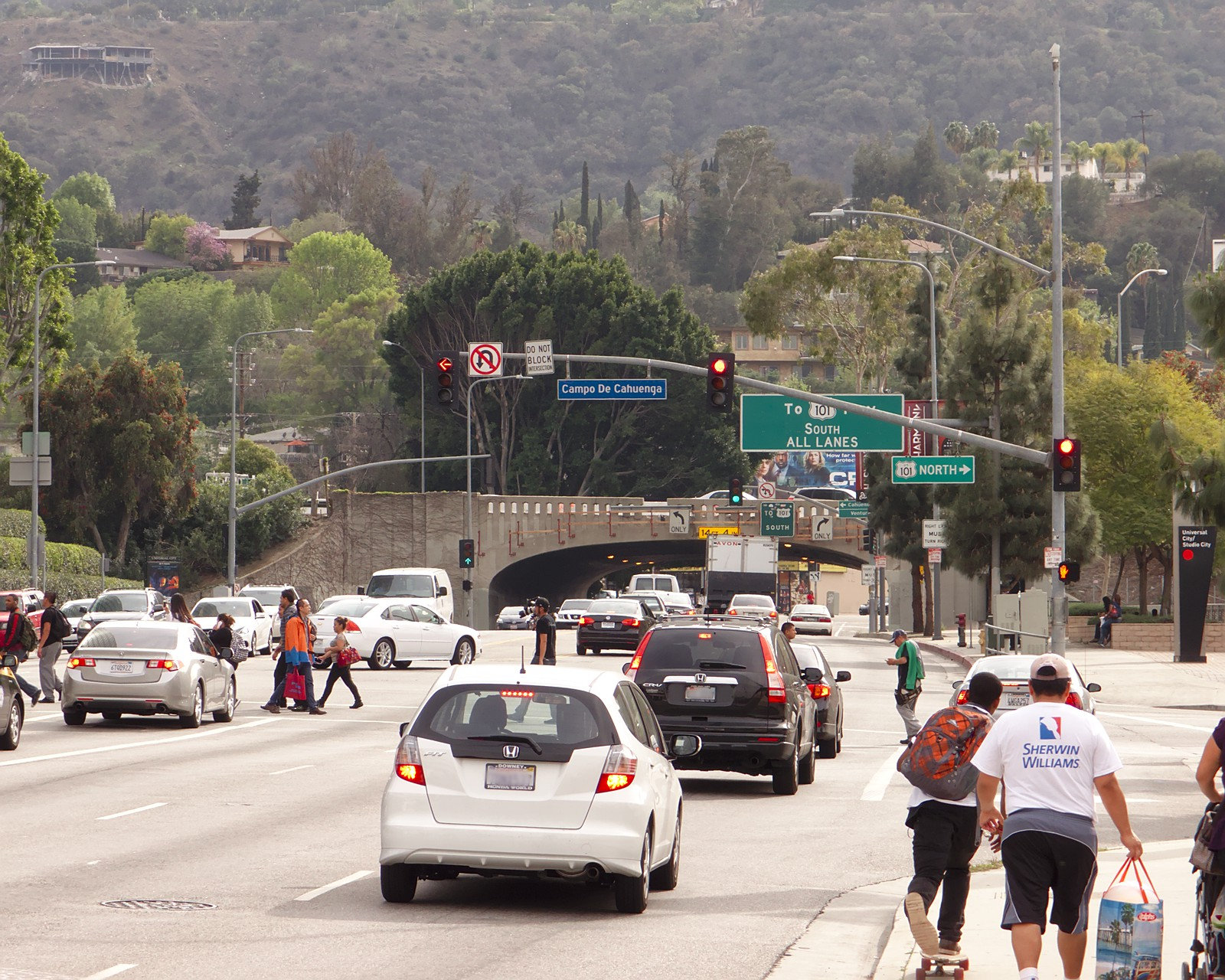
Looking south on Lankershim Boulevard as it approaches the Hollywood Freeway and Ventura Boulevard outside of Universal City/Studio City station, 2014

Lankershim Boulevard's northern terminus is at San Fernando Road in Sun Valley. South of Sun Valley, Lankershim runs through North Hollywood (including the NoHo Arts District, Toluca Lake, and ends south of Ventura Boulevard at Fredonia Drive in Studio City. Lankershim also marks the east–west border between Los Angeles and Universal City in Studio City.

Lankershim crosses and intersects with Interstate 5, State Route 134, and US Route 101. South of a five-way intersection at Victory Boulevard, Lankershim runs diagonally to the southeast, creating two six-way intersections, the first at Burbank Boulevard and Tujunga Avenue, and the second at Vineland Avenue and Camarillo Street. Finally, at Lankershim's busy southern end, it crosses the Los Angeles River as it briefly merges with Cahuenga Boulevard before passing Campo de Cahuenga, the Universal City/Studio City Metro Station, Universal Studios Hollywood, and 10 Universal City Plaza, then crosses the Hollywood Freeway and Ventura Boulevard, all within about 0.5 miles (0.8 km).

== History ==
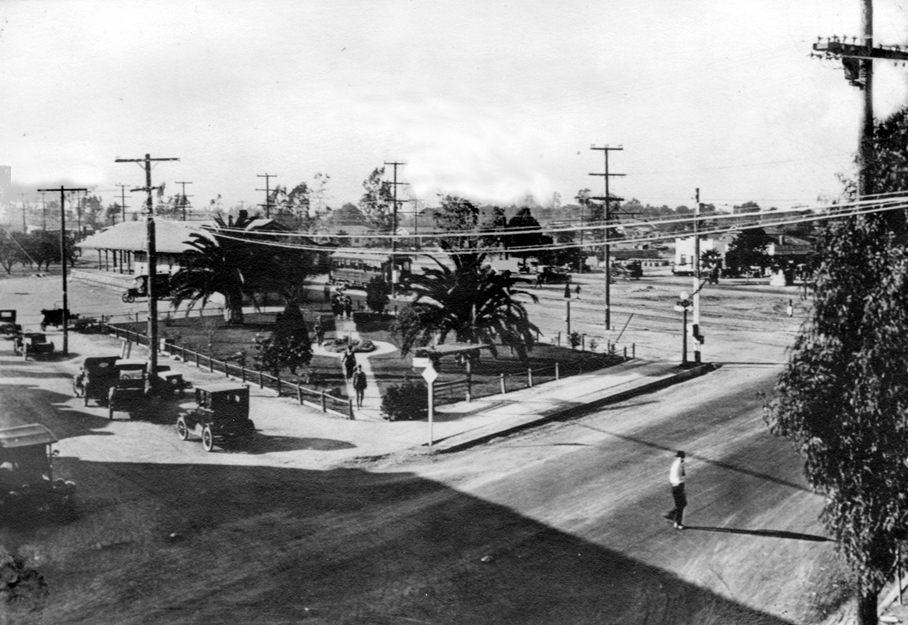
Pacific Electric station at Lankershim and Chandler, 1919

Lankershim Boulevard was named after Isaac Lankershim, one of the area's founding families, and is one of the oldest streets in what is now North Hollywood. The boulevard was a major thoroughfare for the town of Toluca (which was renamed Lankershim in 1896 and North Hollywood in 1927), connecting it to Los Angeles by way of the Cahuenga Pass. In the center of Toluca, Lankershim crossed the Southern Pacific Railroad, with a depot near the current location of the North Hollywood station at Chandler Boulevard.

Lankershim Boulevard around Magnolia Boulevard was the heart of the town of Lankershim/North Hollywood and until the mid-1950s boasted the largest concentration of retail stores, banks, restaurants, and entertainment in the San Fernando Valley. In 1953 for example, the shopping strip included three full-line department stores: J.C. Penney, Yeakel & Goss, and Rathbun's. The street also featured branches of Harris & Frank, J. J. Newberry, and Safeway. However, the nearby Valley Plaza shopping center, designed for accessibility by car and featuring plenty of free parking, opened in 1951 and by 1956 it claimed to be the third-largest shopping center in the United States. Lankershim's retail district had difficulty competing and by 1980, most of its stores had closed. One of the most notable closures was Donte's, one of the West Coast's best-known jazz clubs in the 1970s and 1980s. It opened in 1966, closed in 1988, and is now the site of a BMW auto dealership.

In 2000, the San Fernando Valley was connected to the Los Angeles Metro via two B Line stops on Lankershim: North Hollywood and Universal City/Studio City stations. During construction, Campo de Cahuenga's foundations were unearthed and preserved as an exhibit, with the foundation's footprint marked by decorative pavement on the sidewalk and street.

In 2005, the G Line opened, connecting to the B Line at North Hollywood station on Lankershim.

In 2015, Lankershim and Ventura Boulevards were the site of CicLAvia, a Los Angeles County Metropolitan Transportation Authority sponsored event in which major roads are temporarily closed to motorized vehicles and used for recreational human-powered transport.

== Transportation ==
Metro Local line 224 serves Lankershim Boulevard.

Two Metro stations are located on Lankershim: North Hollywood and Universal City/Studio City. Both stations are served by the B Line and the former is also served by the G Line.

== Landmarks ==
Three Los Angeles Cultural-Historic Monuments are located on Lankershim: Campo de Cahuenga, El Portal Theater, and the Department of Water and Power Building. Other notable landmarks on Lankershim include (from south to north): 10 Universal City Plaza, Universal Studios Hollywood, Yitzak Rabin Square, South Weddington Park, St. Charles Borromeo Catholic Church, Bob and Delores Hope Square, The Comedy Chateau, HAHA Comedy Club, NoHo Gateway Sign, Lankershim Arts Center, Toluca Southern Pacific Depot, Tiara Street Park, and Sikh Gurdwara of Los Angeles.
