= Lankershim Arts Center =

Art center and historic building in Los Angeles, California

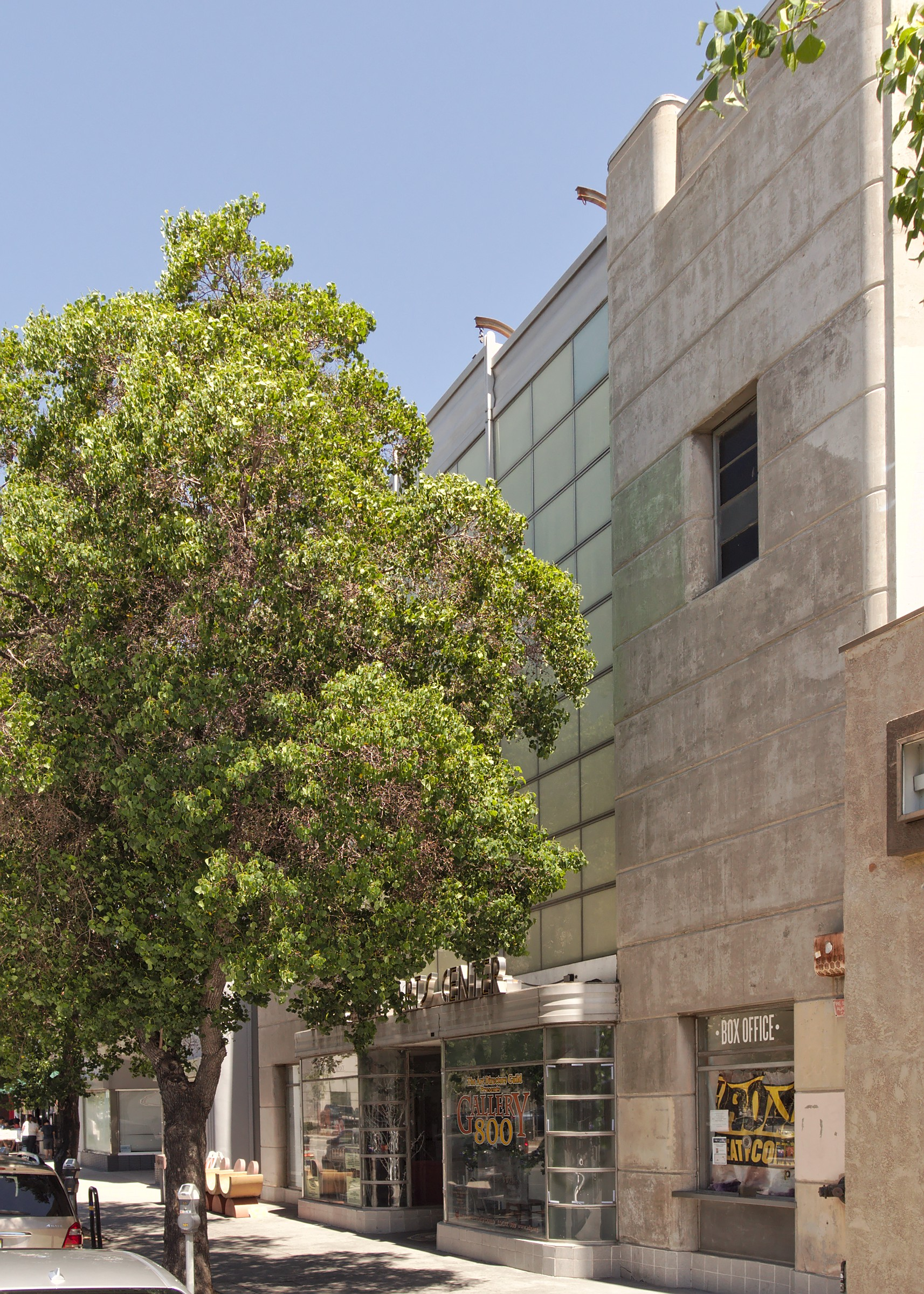
- The building in 2015

- Location within the Los Angeles metropolitan area
- Former names: Department of Water and Power Building
- Location: 5108 Lankershim Boulevard, North Hollywood, CA 91601
- Coordinates: 34.163°N 118.373°W
- Operator: City of Los Angeles Department of Cultural Affairs
- Capacity: 66 in the gallery performance space, 44 in the Black Box Theatre
- Type: Performing arts and gallery space
- Public transit: North Hollywood

Construction
- Built: 1939
- Renovated: 1990

Website
- culture.lacity.gov/cultural-centers/lankershim-arts-center/

Los Angeles Historic-Cultural Monument
- Designated: July 14, 1980
- Reference no.: 232
- Name: Department of Water and Power Building
- Architect: Charles S. Lee
- Architectural style: Streamline Moderne

Lankershim Arts Center, also known as the Department of Water and Power Building, is an art center and historic building located at 5108 Lankershim Boulevard in the NoHo Arts District in North Hollywood, California. Originally built for the Los Angeles Department of Water and Power, the building has since been adapted into a performing arts and gallery space. It was designated a Los Angeles Historic-Cultural Monument in 1980.

== History ==
The Department of Water and Power Building was designed by Charles S. Lee in the Streamline Moderne style in 1939. Designed to be light and flamboyant, the building was originally a neighborhood administration office for the Department of Water and Power, and was built when the organization believed their buildings should be monumental symbols of a benevolent government role in daily life.

The building was designated a Los Angeles Historic-Cultural Monument in 1980 and it was refurbished in 1990, after which it became the Lankershim Art Center, a gallery and theater space that features 493 square feet (45.8 m^{2}) of gallery/performance space, a 367 square feet (34.1 m^{2}) dance floor, and a 364 square feet (33.8 m^{2}) 44-seat theater. Since its conversion, the building has been home to the Road Theatre Company and the Art Directors Guild’s Gallery 800. The City of Los Angeles Department of Cultural Affairs owns and operates the space.
