= Idle Hour Café =

Historic bar and restaurant in Los Angeles, California, U.S.

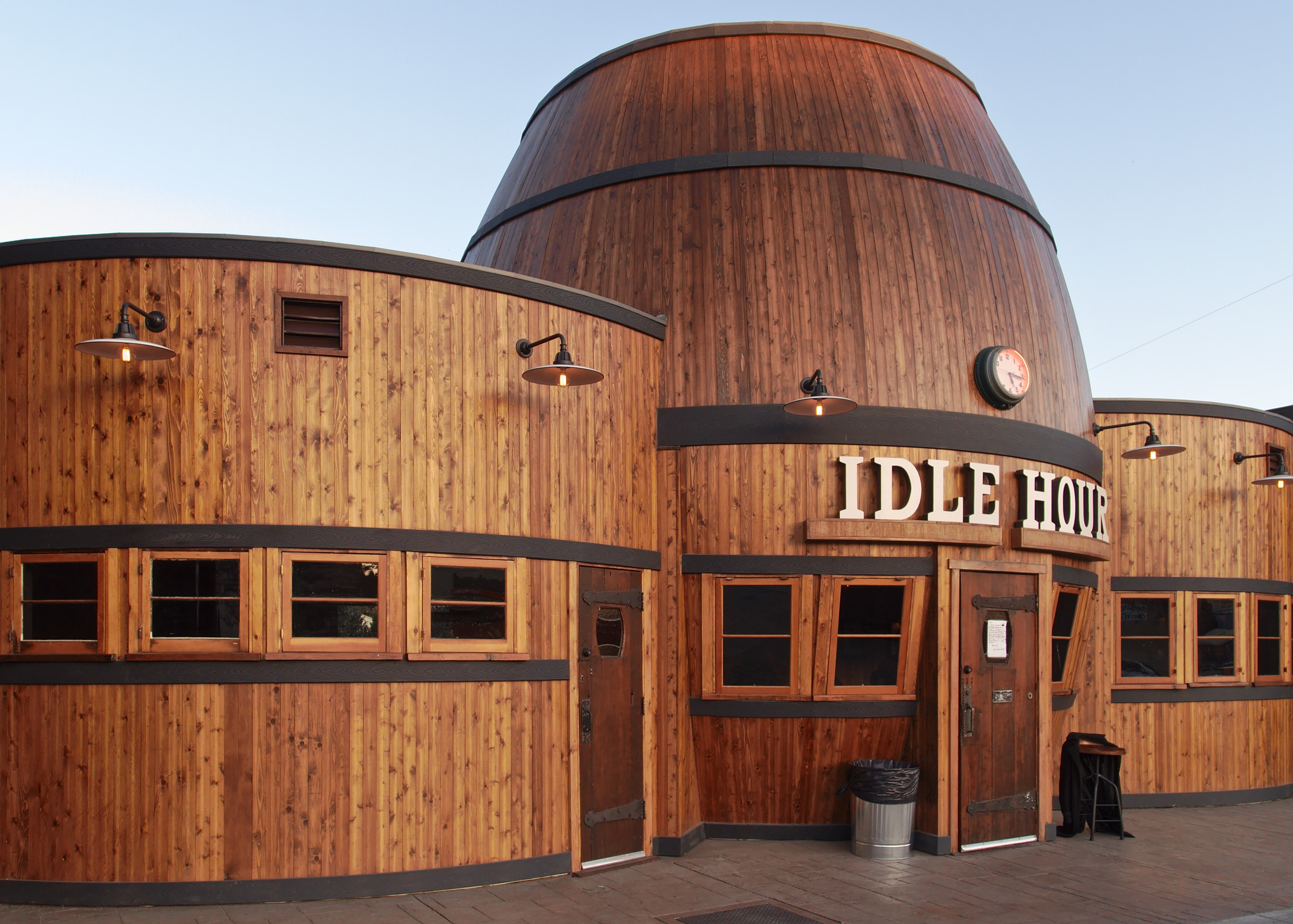
- The business in 2015
- Interactive map of Idle Hour Café

Restaurant information
- Established: 1941, 2015
- Closed: 1984
- Owner: 1933 Group
- Previous owners: Michael D. Connolly; Irene Connolly; Jose and Dolores Fernandez
- Location: 4824 Vineland Avenue, Los Angeles, Los Angeles County, California
- Coordinates: 34.1585°N 118.3699°W
- Website: https://www.idlehourbar.com/

Idle Hour Café, also known as Idle Hour, is a historic bar and restaurant located at 4824 Vineland Avenue in North Hollywood's NoHo Arts District in Los Angeles, California. Opened in 1941, it is best known for the programmatic architecture of the building it is in. The building was declared Los Angeles Cultural-Historic Monument #977 in 2010.

== History ==
Idle Hour was built in 1941 on land bought by Universal Studios film technician Michael D. Connolly. The building was designed in a barrel shape and housed a cafe and tap room, as well as an apartment in the head of the barrel, where Michael lived with his wife Irene.

Michael and Irene divorced after he returned from Merchant Marine service during World War II, at which point Irene took over the cafe's operations. Irene renamed the establishment Rudy's Keg in the late 1960s.

In 1971, the building was bought by flamenco dancers Jose and Dolores Fernandez, who transformed the dining area into a dinner theater named La Caña. The theater remained open until 1984, after which Dolores continued living in the building's apartment until 2009, and the City of Los Angeles acquired the property after her death in 2010.

In 2010, the building was designated Los Angeles Cultural-Historic Monument #977. One year later, the property was bought by 1933 Group, who restored it, returned the business to its original name, and reopened it in 2015. The total cost for the reopening was $1.4 million ($1.9 million in 2025).

== Architecture ==
Idle Hour was built by George F. Fordyk and features programmatic architecture, taking the shape of a two-story whiskey barrel. Constructed of redwood, the building is irregular in plan, with one-story C-shaped wings connecting to the barrel's north and south flanks. The barrel features long, bowed planks curving up to a flat, circular ceiling, with the top trimmed in metal to resemble a head hoop, while the C-shaped wings feature vertical planks topped by horizontal fascia and flat, C-shaped ceilings. The overall effect gives the building a Streamline Moderne appearance.

The building's original entrance is a single panel door located at the bottom-center of the barrel. The barrel also features four wood-frame, double hung windows located where the bilge hoops would be on an actual barrel. Each wing contains five similar styled windows at the same height as those in the barrel, and the north wing contains a side entrance that has since become the main entrance to the building.

The building's interior, which continues its exterior geometry, features a wood ceiling as well as barrel-shaped and curved walls covered in vertical groove redwood panelling.

Idle Hour's design was meant to attract passing motorists who wouldn't notice window signage and adverts. The integrity of the building is considered high, and when it originally opened, there were at least three other barrel shaped buildings in Los Angeles; however Idle Hour is the only one that remains.

== Backyard Bulldog ==
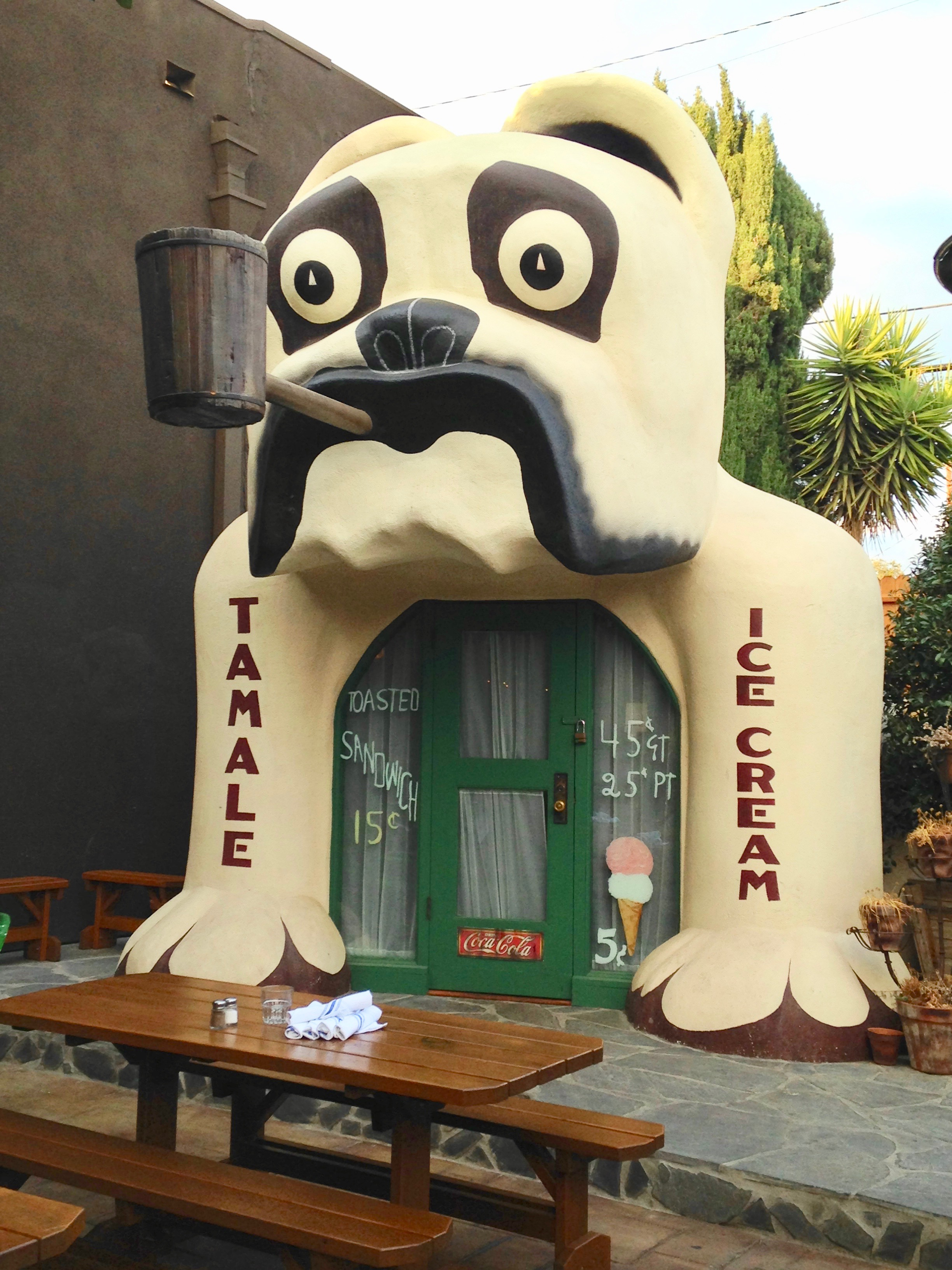
Bulldog Cafe structure in the Idle Hour patio

Idle Hour's back patio features a replica of Bulldog Cafe, a 1928-1960s cafe located on Washington Boulevard in Culver City. The replica was built by the Walt Disney Company for The Rocketeer and was previously held at the Petersen Automotive Museum.
