= Universal City/Studio City station =

Rapid transit station in Los Angeles, California

Universal City/Studio City
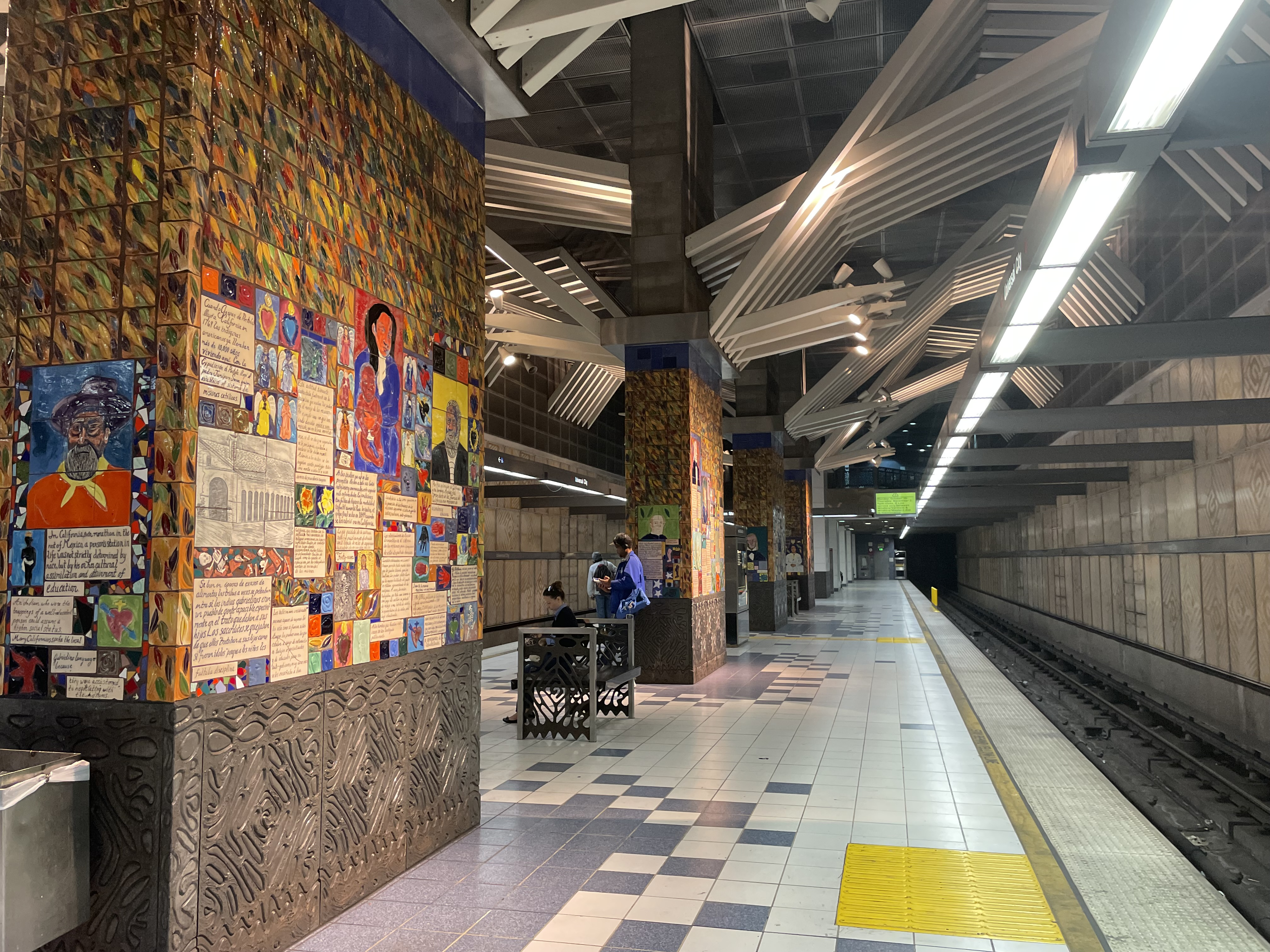
- Universal City/Studio City station platform

General information
- Location: 3901 Lankershim Boulevard; Los Angeles, California
- Coordinates: 34.1391°N 118.3625°W
- Owner: Los Angeles Metro
- Platforms: 1 island platform
- Tracks: 2
- Connections: Burbank Bus; Los Angeles Metro Bus; Universal City Shuttle

Construction
- Structure type: Underground
- Parking: 584 spaces, kiss and ride facility
- Cycle facilities: Metro Bike Share station, racks and lockers

History
- Opened: June 24, 2000
- Former names: Universal City (2000–2013)

Passengers
- FY 2026: 3,228 (avg. wkdy boardings)

Services
Preceding station	Metro Rail	Following station
North Hollywood Terminus	B Line	Hollywood/Highland toward Union Station
Location

Universal City/Studio City station is an underground rapid transit station on the B Line of the Los Angeles Metro Rail system. It is located under Lankershim Boulevard at its intersection of Campo de Cahuenga and Universal Hollywood Drive in the neighborhoods of Universal City and Studio City, after which the station is named.

The station is located near the Universal Studios Hollywood theme park, the Universal CityWalk entertainment complex, and the NBCUniversal studio complex. The station was built around the historic Campo de Cahuenga, an adobe ranch house where the Treaty of Cahuenga was signed in 1847, ending hostilities in California between Mexico and the United States.

== Location ==
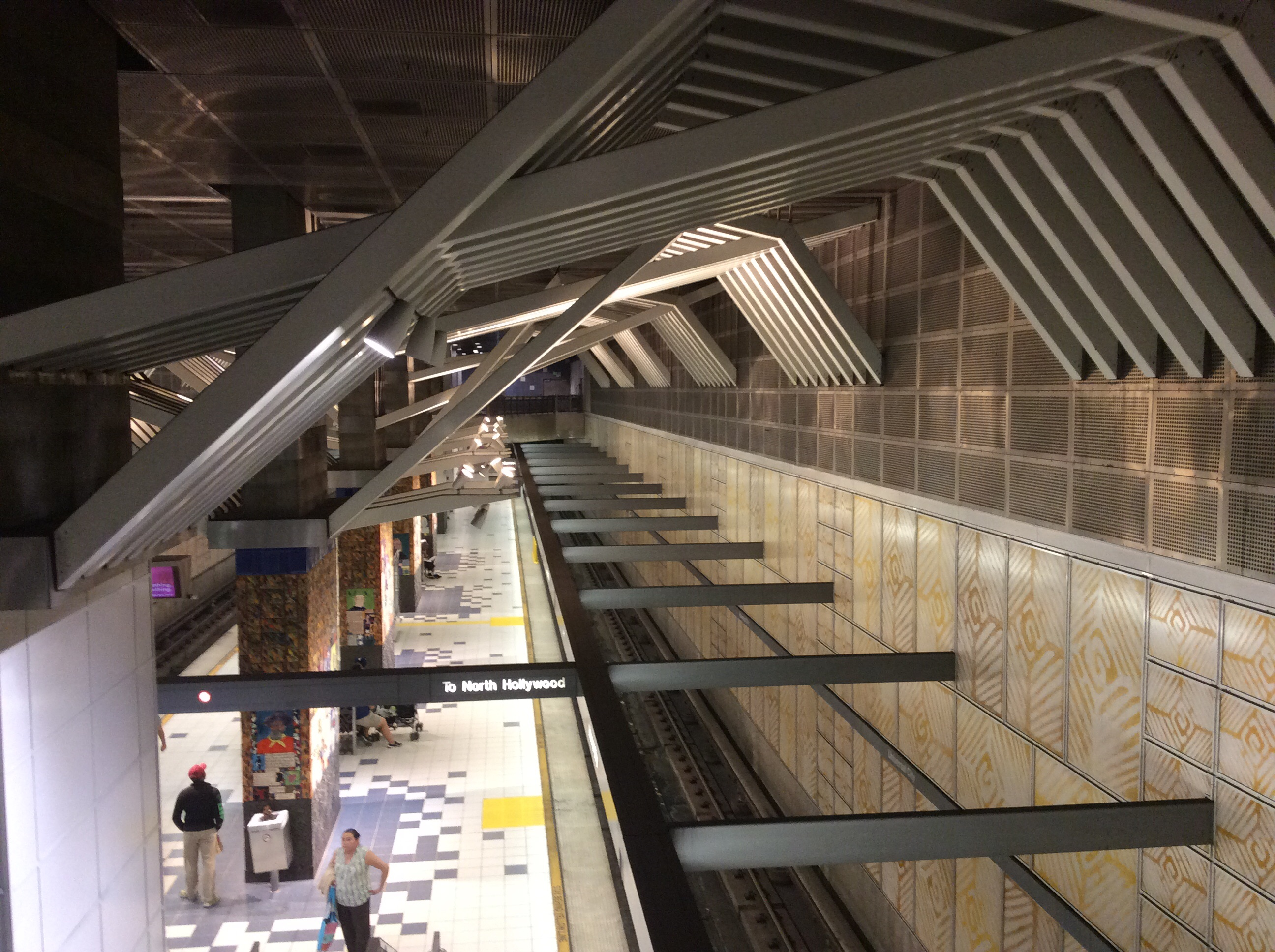
The platform as seen from the mezzanine level of the station

Universal City/Studio City station lies within the Los Angeles neighborhood of Studio City, specifically at the intersection of Lankershim Boulevard, Campo de Cahuenga and Universal Terrace Parkway. Universal City/Studio City station straddles the hills between the Los Angeles Basin to the south and the San Fernando Valley to the north. Just southeast of the station, across the Hollywood Freeway (U.S. Route 101) is the Cahuenga Pass, consisting of a strip of shops, restaurants and offices that follow US 101, but along Cahuenga Boulevard, which parallels the freeway through the pass.

=== Universal Studios Hollywood ===
Universal City/Studio City station serves the nearby Universal Studios Hollywood theme park, the Universal CityWalk entertainment complex, along with the Hilton Universal and Sheraton Universal hotels. Beyond the tourist attractions, the station also serves the working Universal Studios Lot, the Brokaw News Center (KNBC, KVEA, Telemundo and NBC News bureaus) and the 10 Universal City Plaza office building.

To access the tourist attractions, riders cross the street using a pedestrian bridge and board a tram to go to CityWalk and the theme park. A pedestrian tunnel was originally proposed by Metro but was ultimately scrapped because of NBCUniversal's reluctance to pay the growing costs of the project.

== History ==
In the early planning stages in the 1980s, Universal City/ Studio City station was originally going to be an elevated station; but due to local opposition and safety concerns, the station was put underground as a subway station. Part of MOS-3 of the Red Line, Universal City/Studio City opened on June 24, 2000, as part of an extension from Hollywood/Vine to North Hollywood, the latter of which remains the line's northwestern terminus.

Universal, in conjunction with Metro, constructed a pedestrian bridge over Lankershim Boulevard and Universal Hollywood Drive that opened in April 2016. NBCUniversal agreed to fund a portion of the $19.5 million project, while the remainder was funded through Proposition A.

== Service ==
=== Station layout ===
Universal City/Studio City is an underground station, located alongside Lankershim Boulevard at its intersection with Campo de Cahuenga. Access is provided by two entrances, one on the northwest corner and another on the southwest corner of the intersection. A pedestrian bridge connects the northwest corner entrance to the northeast and southeast corners, with the southeast corner housing the Universal City Shuttle platform.

The station features a park and ride lot. Several public bus lines stop or terminate at the bus plaza on the west side of Lankershim Boulevard, adjacent to the station, while others are found by crossing to the east side of Lankershim Boulevard.

=== Hours and frequency ===
B Line trains run every day between approximately 4:30 a.m. and midnight. Trains operate every 10 minutes during peak hours. Early morning and night service is approximately every 20 minutes.

=== Connections ===
As of September 10, 2023, the following connections are available:

- Burbank Bus: Pink Route
- Los Angeles Metro Bus: 155, 222 via Hollywood Burbank Airport, 224, 240
- Universal City Shuttle (free tram to Universal Studios Hollywood & Universal CityWalk Hollywood)
