= Burbank Bus =

Bus service in Burbank, California, United States

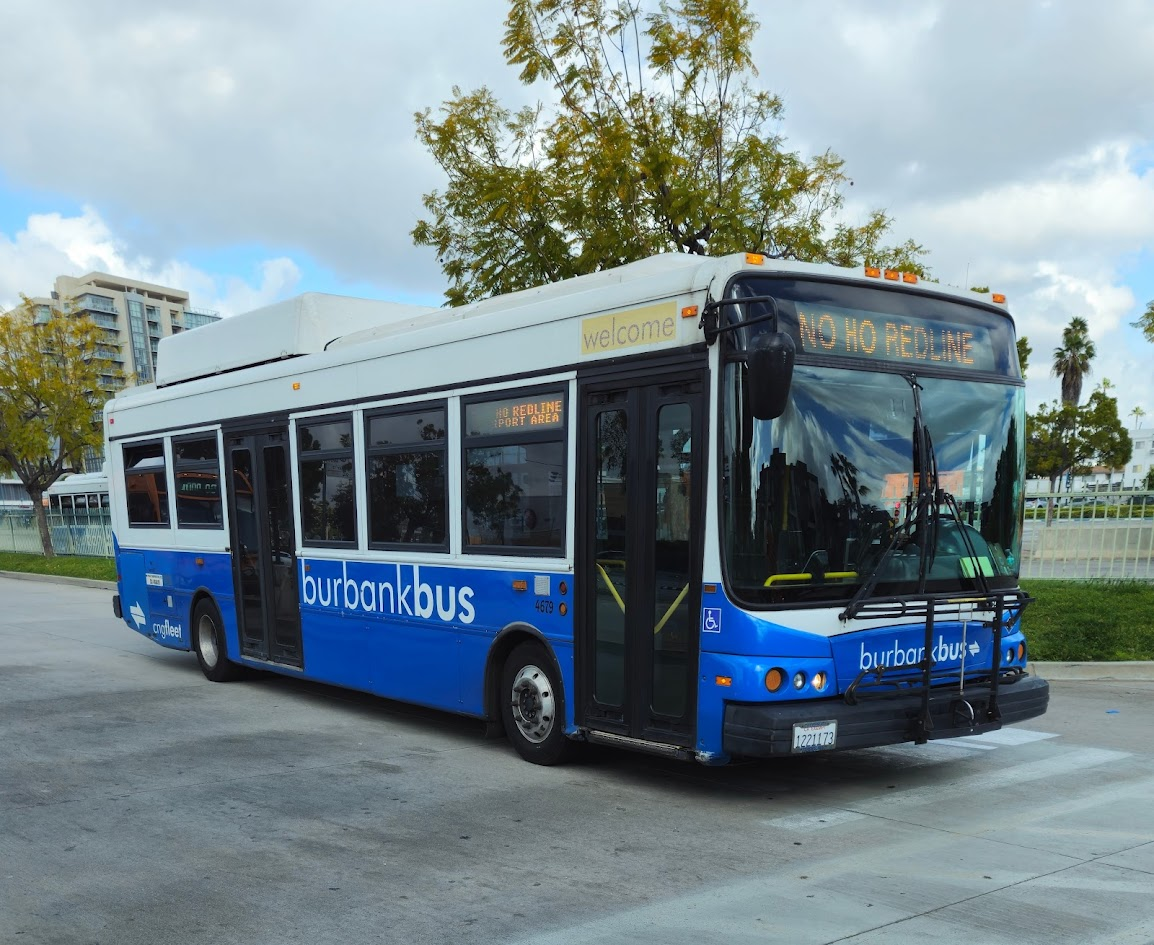
- Parent: City of Burbank
- Headquarters: 275 Olive Avenue East
- Locale: Burbank, California
- Service type: bus, paratransit
- Fleet: 16 buses
- Fuel type: CNG
- Operator: MV Transportation
- Website: www.burbankca.gov/burbankbus

Burbank Bus (stylized as BurbankBus) in Burbank, California is a city-operated public transport bus service, providing local routes within the city including connections with rail service to Los Angeles or surrounding suburbs. Burbank Bus complements the Los Angeles County Metropolitan Transportation Authority's crosstown routes through the city. MV Transportation has operated the system for the city since 2011.

== Service ==
=== Fixed-Route ===
| Route | Terminals | | via |
|---|---|---|---|
| Pink Route | Studio City; Universal City/Studio City B Line Station | Burbank; Downtown Burbank Metrolink Station | Riverside Dr, Olive Ave |
| Orange Route | North Hollywood; North Hollywood Station | Burbank; Hollywood Burbank Airport | Burbank Blvd, Buena Vista St, Hollywood Way |

=== Paratransit ===
Burbank Bus Senior and Disabled (BBS&D) paratransit provides curb-to-curb transportation services for seniors and persons with disabilities living in Burbank, allowing them to maintain healthy and active lifestyles. To be eligible for BBS&D, City of Burbank residents must be 60 years of age or older or qualify by nature of a disability.

=== Active fleet ===
| Make/Model | Fleet numbers | Year | Engine | Transmission |
|---|---|---|---|---|
| NABI Ultra LF CNG 35 | 4770-4774 | 2009 | Cummins Westport ISL G | Allison B300R |
| ENC Axess BRT CNG 35' | 5111-5116 | 2017 | Cummins Westport L9N | Allison B400R |
| ENC Axess BRT CNG 35' | 5422-5427 | 2024 | Cummins Westport L9N | Allison B400R |

== See also ==
- Glendale Beeline
- Los Angeles Metro Bus
