= Magnolia Boulevard =

Arterial road in the San Fernando Valley

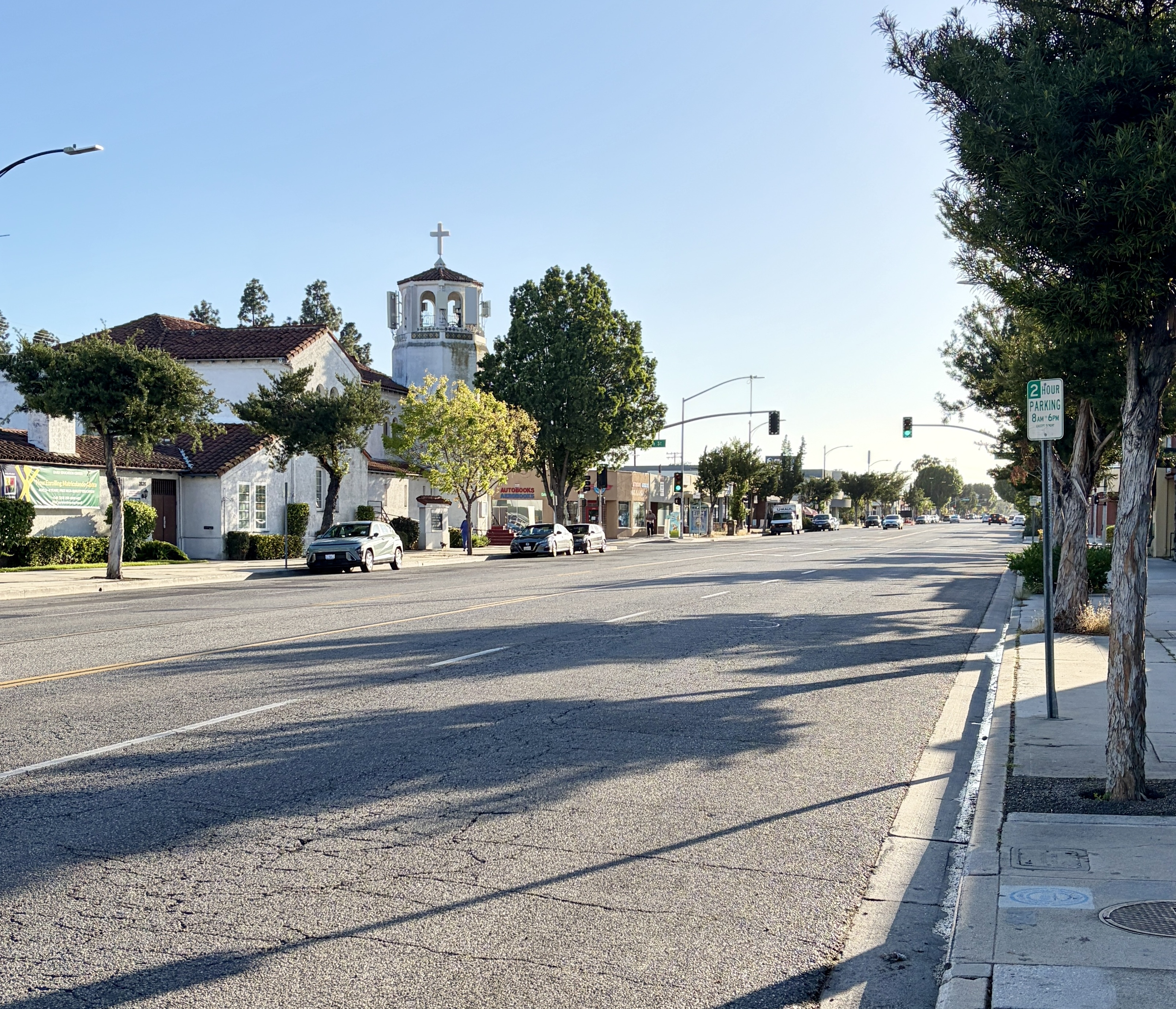
- Magnolia Boulevard in Magnolia Park, Burbank
- Interactive map of Magnolia Boulevard
- Namesake: Magnolia tree
- Maintained by: Bureau of Street Services, Los Angeles Department of Water and Power, City of Burbank
- Length: 10 mi (16 km)
- West end: Sepulveda Boulevard in Sherman Oaks
- Major junctions: SR 170
- East end: Sunset Canyon Drive in Burbank

Magnolia Boulevard is a major east–west arterial road that runs for 10 miles (16 km) across the southeastern San Fernando Valley in Los Angeles and Burbank, California.

== Name ==
Magnolia Boulevard, originally named Magnolia Avenue, was named after the magnolia tree. It is one of several tree-themed streets in Burbank, the others being Walnut, Cypress, Palm, Orange Grove, and Olive, with Magnolia being the only one that extends into Los Angeles. Magnolia was changed from an avenue to a boulevard in 1923.

== Route ==
Magnolia Boulevard travels east–west for more than ten miles across the southeastern San Fernando Valley. From west to east, the boulevard travels through Sherman Oaks, Valley Village, North Hollywood, and Burbank. Within North Hollywood, Magnolia travels through the NoHo Arts District, and within Burbank, Magnolia travels through Magnolia Park and the Burbank Media District.

Magnolia Boulevard is four lanes for most of its length. The road slightly turns at the Los Angeles/Burbank border, traveling east–west in Los Angeles and east-northeast west-southwest in Burbank.

== Transit ==
Metro Local Line 155 runs along Magnolia Boulevard between Sepulveda and Lankershim Boulevards. Metro Local Line 94 runs along Magnolia between Vineland Avenue and Victory Boulevard.

== Notable landmarks ==
Notable landmarks on Magnolia Boulevard include (from west to east): Van Nuys/Sherman Oaks Recreation Center, The Magnolia (Los Angeles Historic-Cultural Monument No. 293), North Hollywood Park, Amelia Earhart Square, William Edward Hooper Square, the Academy of Television Arts & Sciences, Magnolia Power Project, and Burbank Town Center. The Tower of Wooden Pallets (Los Angeles Historic-Cultural Monument No. 184) was also formerly located on Magnolia Boulevard.

Schools on Magnolia Boulevard include (from west to east): Emek Hebrew Academy, Chandler Elementary, Louis Armstrong Middle School, North Hollywood High School, Oakwood High School, and Lankershim Elementary.
