= Universal Filmed Entertainment Group =

American entertainment company

- Logo used since 2013

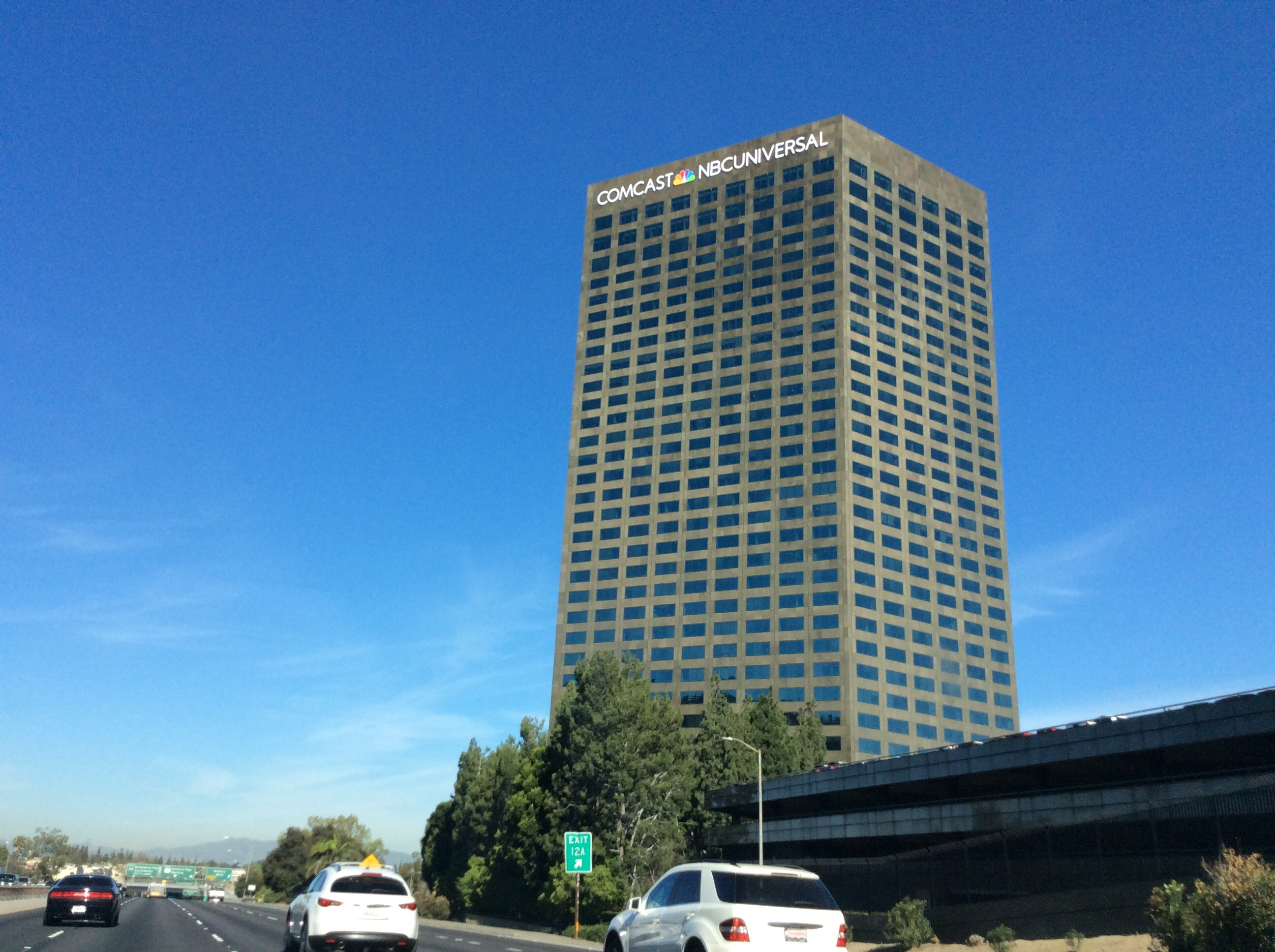
- The headquarters at 10 Universal City Plaza in Universal City, California
- Formerly: Universal City Studios, Inc. (1996–1999); Universal Studios, Inc. (1999–2013)
- Type: Division
- Industry: Entertainment
- Predecessor: MCA
- Founded: December 9, 1996; 29 years ago
- Headquarters: 10 Universal City Plaza, Universal City, California, U.S.
- Area served: Worldwide
- Key people: Donna Langley (chairwoman) Peter Cramer (president)
- Revenue: ▲US$11.622 billion (2022)
- Parent: Seagram (1996–2000); Vivendi Universal Entertainment (2000–2004); NBCUniversal (2004–present)
- Divisions: Universal Pictures; Universal Brand Development; Universal Global Talent Development and Inclusion
- Subsidiaries: Back Lot Music; Makeready (co-backing with Lionsgate Canada)
- Website: universalpictures.com

The Universal Filmed Entertainment Group (UFEG), also known as Universal Filmed Entertainment, Universal Entertainment and doing business as Universal Studios (formerly known as Universal Studios Inc.), is an American entertainment company and business unit within NBCUniversal, a subsidiary of Comcast, that oversees and manages its film and television businesses, including its flagship divisions, Universal Pictures and Universal Television.

The company was formed in 1996 following the acquisition of MCA by Seagram, and its subsequent rebranding to Universal Studios Inc., which would later take on its current name in 2013. Since its formation, the company has become a major force in the film and entertainment industries.

Its studios are located in Universal City, California, and its corporate offices are located in New York City.

== History ==
=== Seagram ===
On December 9, 1996, a year after its acquisition by Seagram, MCA was rebranded to Universal Studios Inc. and MCA's music division, MCA Music Entertainment Group, was renamed Universal Music Group. MCA Records continued to live on as a label within the Universal Music Group. The following year, G. P. Putnam's Sons was sold to the Penguin Group subsidiary of Pearson PLC.

In 1996, Universal Studios filed a lawsuit against Viacom over Viacom's launch of the TV Land cable network. Viacom had purchased Paramount in 1994, and the contract for USA Network prohibited either of their owners from owning cable channels outside the joint venture. Viacom had owned MTV Networks (the parent of TV Land) since 1985. The suit was settled when Viacom sold MCA its half of the joint venture. TV Land eventually added shows from the MCA/Universal library in 1999.

=== Vivendi and NBCUniversal ===
To raise money, Seagram head Edgar Bronfman Jr. sold Universal's television holdings, including cable network USA, to Barry Diller (these same properties would be bought back later at greatly inflated prices). In June 2000, Seagram was sold to French water utility and media company Vivendi, which owned StudioCanal; the conglomerate then became known as Vivendi Universal.

In March 2001 following Vivendi's acquisition of Universal Studios and its parent Seagram, Universal Studios established a new subsidiary that would handle, manage and expand Universal Pictures' key intellectual properties across multiple platforms entitled Universal Pictures Franchise Development with Universal Studios' consumer products & licensing division Universal Pictures Consumer Products and Universal Studios' home entertainment division Universal Pictures Home Entertainment alongside its animation production division Universal Cartoon Studios & London-based British production division Universal Pictures Visual Programming became divisions of the new subsidiary while Louis Feola became president of the new subsidiary.

In the spring of 2003, MCA Records was folded into Geffen Records. Its country music label, MCA Nashville Records, is still in operation. MCA's classical music catalog is managed by Deutsche Grammophon.

Burdened with debt, in 2004, Vivendi Universal sold 80% of Vivendi Universal Entertainment (including the studio and theme parks) to General Electric (GE), parent of NBC. However, the sale of Universal to NBC and GE did not include Universal Music Group, which had been a part of the film company since 1962. UMG was placed under separate management through Vivendi. The resulting company was named NBCUniversal, while Universal Studios Inc. remained the name of the production subsidiary. After that deal, GE owned 80% of NBC Universal; Vivendi held the remaining 20%, with an option to sell its share in 2006.

In late 2005, Viacom's Paramount Pictures acquired DreamWorks SKG after acquisition talks between GE and DreamWorks stalled. Universal's long-time chairperson, Stacey Snider, left the company in early 2006 to head up DreamWorks. Snider was replaced by then-Vice chairman Marc Shmuger and Focus Features head David Linde. On October 5, 2009, Marc Shmuger and David Linde were ousted, and their co-chairperson jobs were consolidated under former president of worldwide marketing and distribution Adam Fogelson, becoming the single chairperson. Donna Langley was also upped to co-chairperson. In May 2009, Universal Studios merged its Consumer Products Group division with its fellow division Universal Studios Partnerships division to form one consumer products & licensing division that all of the studio’s consumer product licensing, film and home entertainment promotions and corporate alliances for Universal's theatrical, home entertainment, theme parks and stage productions alongside licensing consumer products within the group entitled Universal Partnerships and Licensing. Universal Studios Partnership header Stephanie Sperber assumed the title role of the merged consumer products division as executive VP, whilst senior VP Amy Taylor would oversee Universal Partnerships & Licensing's North American promotions, worldwide licensing and retail development; it would rebrand themselves to Universal Brand Development by 2016. Five years later in June 2014, Universal Partnerships & Licensing had interrogated consumers products from its fellow NBCUniversal units NBC Entertainment and the children's channel Sprout as the unit had oversume consumer products of NBC's productions such as The Tonight Show and Sprout's famous iconic brand Chica. GE purchased Vivendi's share in NBCUniversal in 2011.

=== Comcast ===
GE sold 51% of the company to cable provider Comcast in 2011, including Universal Studios. Comcast merged the former GE subsidiary with its own cable-television programming assets, creating the current NBCUniversal. Following Federal Communications Commission (FCC) approval, the Comcast-GE deal was closed on January 29, 2011. In March 2013, Comcast bought the remaining 49% of NBCUniversal for $16.7 billion.

In September 2013, Universal Studios was renamed Universal Filmed Entertainment Group to oversee the film group's worldwide activities, including the global theatrical and home entertainment businesses. Jeff Shell became the chairman of the new Universal Studios, while the company's former chairman, Ron Meyer, was named as the vice chairman of NBCUniversal. In January 2019, it was announced that Donna Langley would also take over as head of the Universal Filmed Entertainment Group.

In September 2022, Universal Filmed Entertainment Group announced that its parent NBCUniversal had moved the former's consumer products division Universal Brand Development to fellow NBCUniversal theme park & resorts division Universal Parks & Resorts and had it merged with the latter's merchandise unit Universal Parks & Resorts Merchandise Group to form a single unified global consumer products business & focused on theme park experiences division for NBCUniversal's franchises renamed the former to Universal Products & Experiences, with Universal Brand Development president Vince Klaseus had led the rebranded division.

== Units ==
Studio units
| Production | Distribution | Other |
|---|---|---|
| Live-action: Focus World; Working Title Films; Amblin Partners (JV); Animation: Illumination; Illumination Studios Paris; DreamWorks Animation; Universal Animation Studios | Universal Pictures; Universal Pictures International; Universal Pictures Home Entertainment; Focus Features; United International Pictures (50%) | NBCUniversal Entertainment Japan; Classic Media |

- Universal Pictures
  - Universal Pictures International
  - Universal International Distribution
  - Universal Pictures Home Entertainment
  - Universal Pictures Content Group
    - Universal Home Entertainment Productions
    - Universal 1440 Entertainment
      - Universal Animation Studios
    - DreamWorks Animation Home Entertainment
    - Universal Playback
    - NBCUniversal Entertainment Japan
  - Illumination
    - Illumination Studios Paris
    - Illumination Labs
    - Moonlight
  - DreamWorks Animation
    - DreamWorks Animation Television
    - DreamWorks Classics
      - Big Idea Entertainment (in-name-only unit of DreamWorks Animation)
      - Bullwinkle Studios (JV)
      - Harvey Entertainment (in-name-only unit of DreamWorks Animation)
    - DreamWorks Theatricals
    - DreamWorks New Media
      - DreamWorksTV
    - DreamWorks Press
  - Focus Features
- Working Title Films
  - WT^{2} Productions
  - Working Title Television
- Rede Telecine (12.5%, joint venture with Canais Globo, Walt Disney Studios, Paramount Pictures and Metro-Goldwyn-Mayer)
- Universal Brand Development
- Universal Global Talent Development and Inclusion
- Universal Products & Experiences
- Back Lot Music
- United International Pictures (50%, joint venture with Skydance's Paramount Pictures)
- Amblin Partners (minor stake) (JV)
  - Amblin Entertainment
  - Amblin Television
  - DreamWorks Pictures
  - Storyteller Distribution

== Film library ==
Universal Filmed Entertainment Group holds the rights to the film library through its divisions and subsidiaries such as Universal Pictures, Universal Animation Studios, Focus Features, Illumination, and DreamWorks Animation.

== See also ==
- LaserDisc
- MCA Whitney Recording Studio
