= North Hollywood station =

Rapid transit and bus rapid transit station in Los Angeles, California

North Hollywood
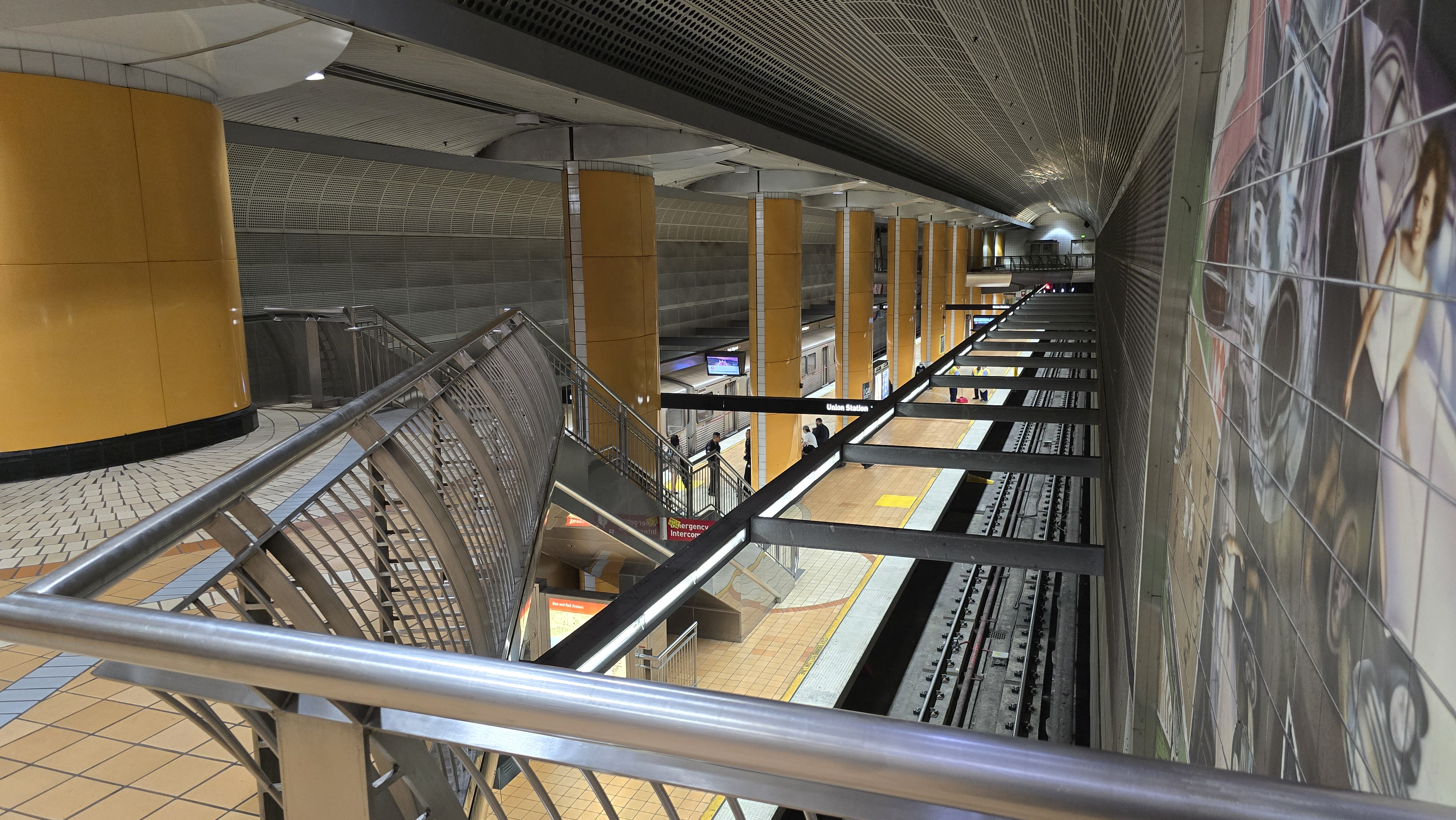
- The B Line station platform of the North Hollywood Station as viewed from the station mezzanine

General information
- Location: 5357 Lankershim Boulevard; Los Angeles, California
- Coordinates: 34.1688°N 118.3766°W
- Owner: Los Angeles Metro
- Platforms: 1 island platform (B Line); 2 side platforms (G Line)
- Connections: See Connections section

Construction
- Structure type: Underground (B Line); At-grade (G Line)
- Parking: 1,085 spaces, kiss and ride facility
- Cycle facilities: Metro Bike Share station, racks and lockers
- Accessible: Yes
- Architect: Tanzmann Associates

History
- Opened: June 24, 2000 (B Line); October 29, 2005 (G Line)

Passengers
- FY 2026: 9,317 (avg. wkdy boardings)

Services
Preceding station	Metro Rail	Following station
Terminus	B Line	Universal City/Studio City toward Union Station
Preceding station	Metro Busway	Following station
Laurel Canyon toward Chatsworth	G Line	Terminus
Former services (Lankershim)
Preceding station	Southern Pacific Railroad	Following station
Garnsey toward Chatsworth	Burbank Branch	Macneil toward Burbank
Preceding station	Pacific Electric	Following station
Eucalyptus toward Canoga Park	Owensmouth	Hoffman toward Subway Terminal
Eucalyptus toward San Fernando	San Fernando	Hoffman toward Subway Terminal
Future services
Preceding station	Metro Busway	Following station
Terminus	North Hollywood to Pasadena Bus Rapid Transit Project	Vineland/Hesby toward Colorado/Hill
Location

North Hollywood station is a combined rapid transit and bus rapid transit station in the Los Angeles Metro Rail and Metro Busway systems. It is the northwestern terminus of the B Line subway and eastern terminus of the G Line BRT route. It is located at the intersection of Lankershim Boulevard and Chandler Boulevard in the NoHo Arts District of the North Hollywood neighborhood in the San Fernando Valley of Los Angeles.

== History ==
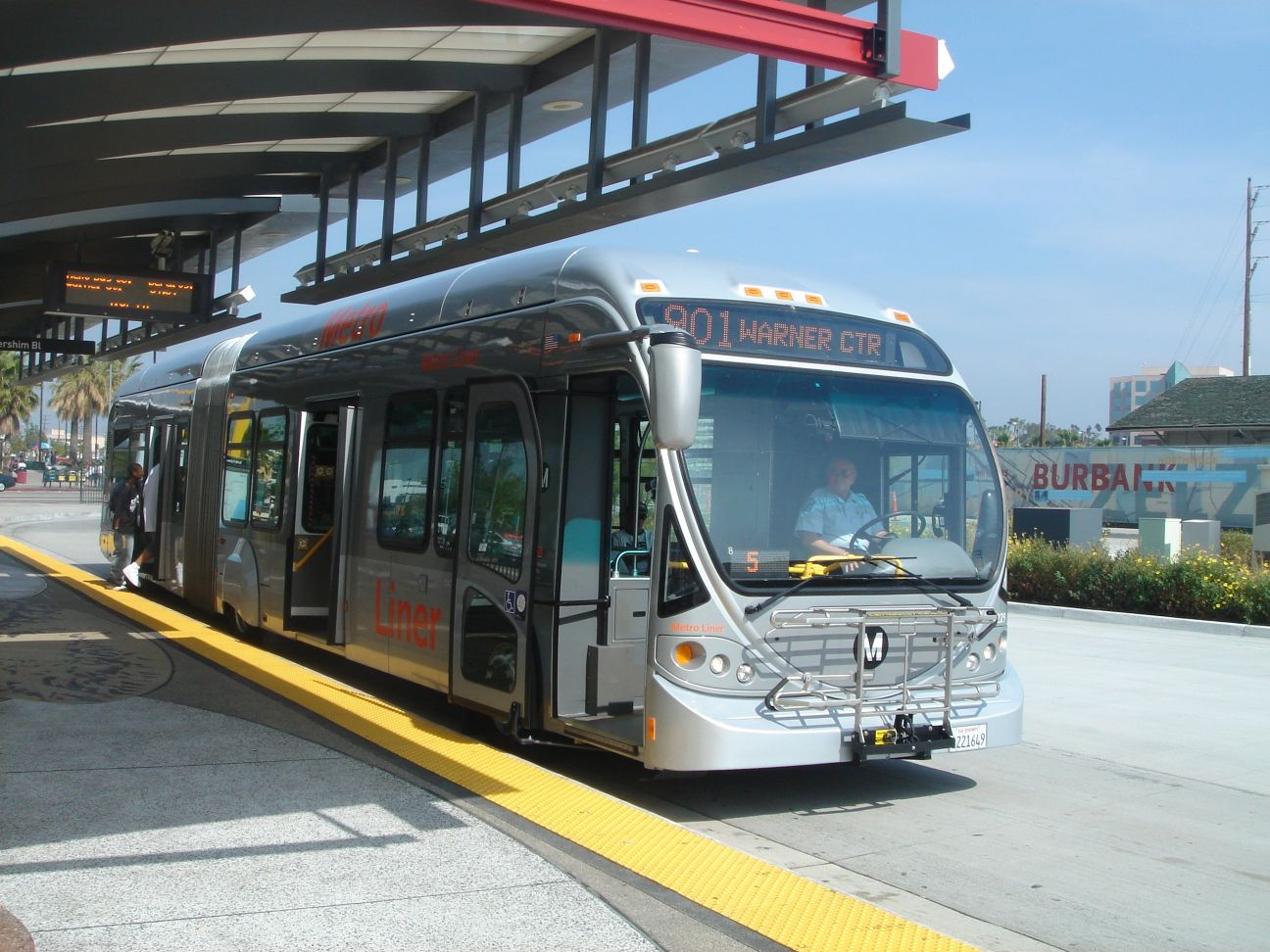
North Hollywood station G Line platform

North Hollywood station was constructed as part of MOS-3 (Minimum Operating Segment 3), the third and final portion of the Red Line project. The station opened on June 24, 2000, after six years of construction.

As the Metro Rail system was being designed in the 1990s, the initial plan was to build an at-grade and elevated extension of the Metro Red Line west from North Hollywood station along the former Pacific Electric/Southern Pacific Railroad Burbank Branch right of way that Metro acquired in 1991. However, by the time the Red Line reached North Hollywood, political developments stymied these plans: community objections to surface transit along the route resulted in a 1991 law mandating that any rail line along the route be built underground, but a 1998 ballot measure driven by perceptions of mismanagement banned the use of county sales tax to fund subway tunneling.

Prevented from using the right of way for rail, Metro proceeded to build a busway along the corridor, despite further lawsuits from area residents. The line opened on October 29, 2005, with its eastern terminus at North Hollywood.

=== Lankershim Depot ===
Lankershim
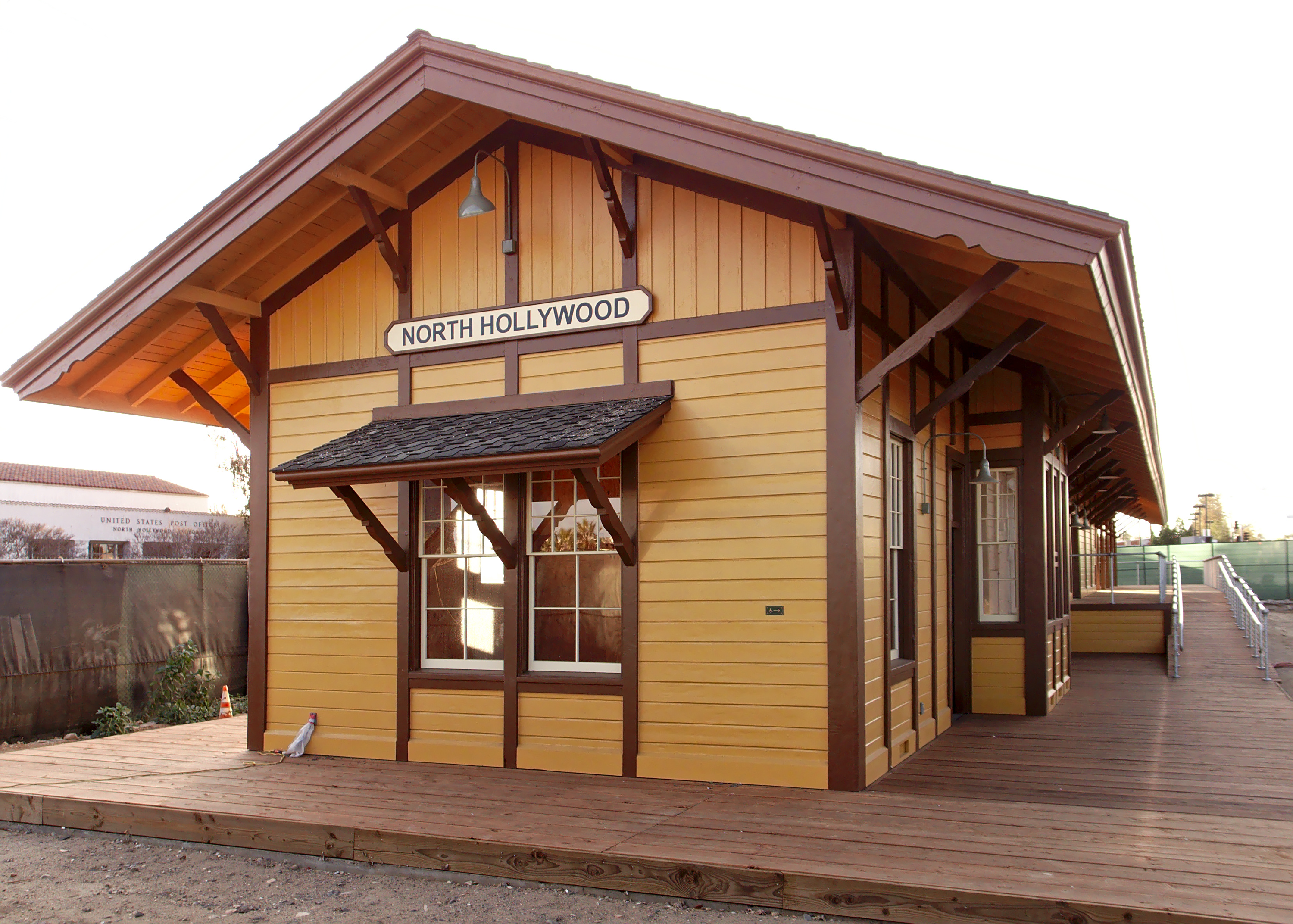
- Historic Lankershim station

General information
- Location: Los Angeles, California; United States
- Lines: Southern Pacific Railroad, Pacific Electric

History
- Opened: 1886
- Closed: 1952
Location

The Lankershim Depot building was "brought to its present-day site on rail cars and assembled" in 1896 as the Toluca Depot of the Southern Pacific Railroad. According to the Los Angeles Conservancy, "At the time...fruit was one of the area’s chief industries. The railroad tracks and stations, including this one, were built to connect the region's agricultural industry to the ports. The building is a one-story wooden structure that originally contained an office and a waiting area."

One of the "few remaining wood-frame, 19th century railroad stations in Southern California," the depot was dual service for Southern Pacific and the Pacific Electric railway from 1911 until it was closed to rail activity in 1952. The historic depot building survives and is located near the current North Hollywood Metro station for the pedestrian tunnel-connected B Line and G Line transit routes. It was subject to a $3.6 million restoration completed in 2016. The renovation incorporated "ADA requirements such as hand railings and ramp lighting." Since 2017, Lankershim Depot has housed a Groundwork coffee shop.

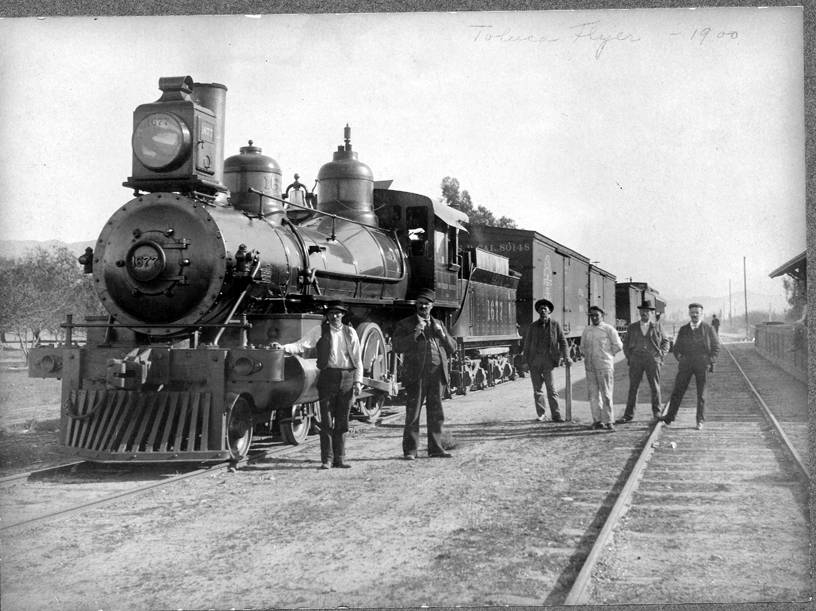
Toluca Flyer train at Lankershim Station c. 1900

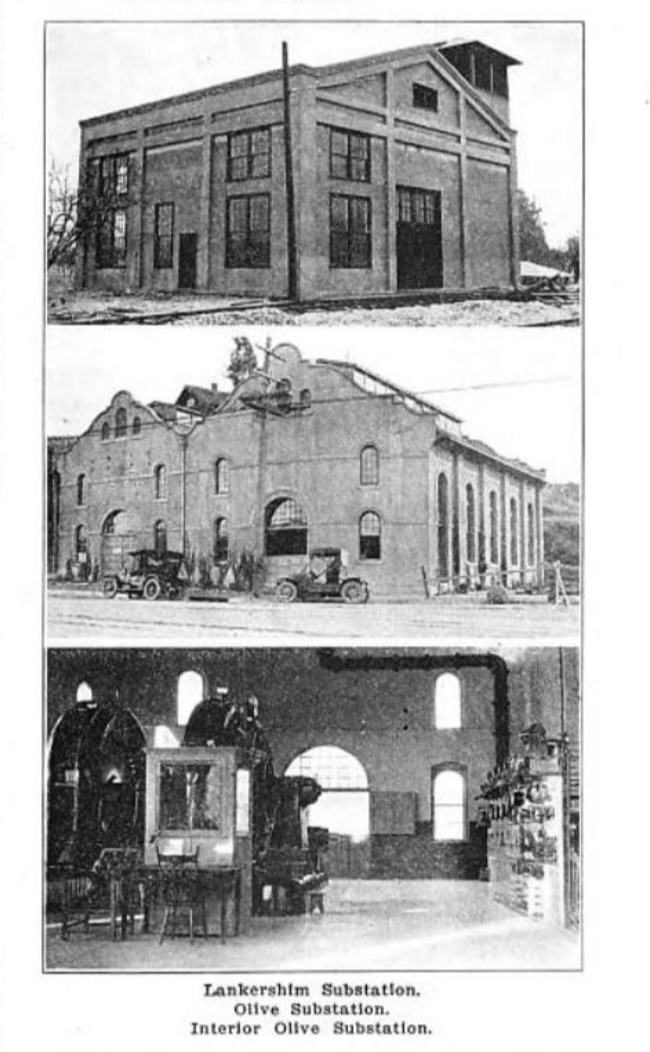
Pacific Electric substation, photo published 1912

=== Development of surrounding area ===
Since the opening of the station in 2000, transit-oriented developments have begun to be constructed in the area around the station including thousands of apartments and office buildings. NoHo Tower (a 15-story apartment building) is across the street from the station and NoHo Commons, a multi-use complex which includes several floors of apartments above a level of retail. In September 2007, transportation officials approved NoHo Art Wave. That project did not start due to the recession, but in 2016 a public-private partnership with the Los Angeles County Metropolitan Transportation Authority was proposed on the 16 acres (6.5 ha) surrounding the station. The 15 acre redevelopment resurfaced in 2023 as "District NoHo". A multi use development with two residential towers standing at 20 and 23 stories, 1,481 homes and one office tower at 21 story, 281 ft. The project would include 60,000 square feet of retail and 450,000 square feet of office space. Development would be a PPP with Trammel Crow Company and LA Metro. To be completed in phases by 2031 directly above the metro station. City approved the plans December 2023.

== Service ==
=== Station layout ===
North Hollywood station is located on two large blocks near the intersection of Lankershim Boulevard and Chandler Boulevard.

The B Line platform is located under Lankershim and the original entrance to the station, under three colorful arched canopies called "Kaleidoscope Dreams," is located on the block east of Lankershim and north of Chandler. This block also contained a large bus plaza and park and ride lot.

The G Line platforms were added about 5 years later, along Chandler and west of Lankershim. For the first 10 years after the opening of the G Line, passengers transferring between the B and G Lines needed to use a crosswalk. Metro constructed a second entrance to the B Line platform on the west side of Lankershim adjacent to the G Line platform in August 2016, easing transfers.

=== Hours and frequency ===
B Line trains run every day between approximately 4:30 a.m. and midnight. Trains operate every 10 minutes during peak hours. Early morning and night service is approximately every 20 minutes.

G Line buses run 24 hours a day. Buses operate every eight minutes during peak hours on weekdays. They operate every ten minutes during the daytime on weekdays and most of the day on weekends. Night service on all days is every 20 minutes.

=== Connections ===
As of January 19, 2025, the following connections are available:

- Burbank Bus: NoHo-Airport (Orange Route) to Hollywood Burbank Airport
- City of Santa Clarita Transit: 757
- Greyhound Lines (depot two blocks south of the station at 11239 Magnolia Blvd)
- LADOT Commuter Express: 549
- LADOT DASH: North Hollywood
- Los Angeles Metro Bus: 90, 94, 152, 154, 155, 162, 224, 237, 501 (NoHo-Pasadena Express), Metro Micro North Hollywood/Burbank

=== Expansion ===
The station is planned as the terminal for the North Hollywood to Pasadena Bus Rapid Transit Project which will run to Pasadena with connections to the A Line.

== Places nearby ==
The station is within walking distance of the following notable places:

- Academy of Television Arts and Sciences
- Chandler Bikeway – begins adjacent to station and proceeds east
- East Valley High School
- El Portal Theatre
- G Line Bikeway – begins adjacent to station and proceeds west
- Historic Lankershim Depot
- Idle Hour Cafe
- Laemmle North Hollywood
- Lankershim Arts Center
- Lankershim Elementary School
- NoHo Arts District
- North Hollywood Amelia Earhart Regional Library
- North Hollywood Masonic Temple
- North Hollywood Park
- North Hollywood Post Office
- Phil's Diner
