= Universal CityWalk Hollywood =

Entertainment district in Los Angeles County, California, U.S.

- Center court (January 2020)
- Location: Universal Studios Hollywood; Universal City, California, U.S.
- Coordinates: 34.1359945°N 118.3551362°W
- Address: 100 Universal City Plaza, 91608
- Opened: May 24, 1993; 33 years ago
- Developer: MCA Universal
- Manager: Universal Destinations & Experiences
- Owner: Universal Destinations & Experiences
- Architect: Jon Jerde
- Num. of stores: 60+ (at peak)
- Num. of anchor tenants: 1 (Universal Cinema - an AMC Theatre; formerly 2; Gibson Amphitheatre demolished)
- Floor area: 540,000 square feet (50,000 m^{2})
- Floors: 2
- Parking: Paid self-parking; Valet parking
- Public transit: Universal City/Studio City Station
- Website: Official website

Universal CityWalk Hollywood is an open-air shopping mall and entertainment complex adjacent to Universal Studios Hollywood in Universal City, California, nearby Hollywood, Los Angeles. The complex was designed by Jon Jerde and opened in May 1993, and is owned and managed by Universal Destinations & Experiences.

== Overview ==
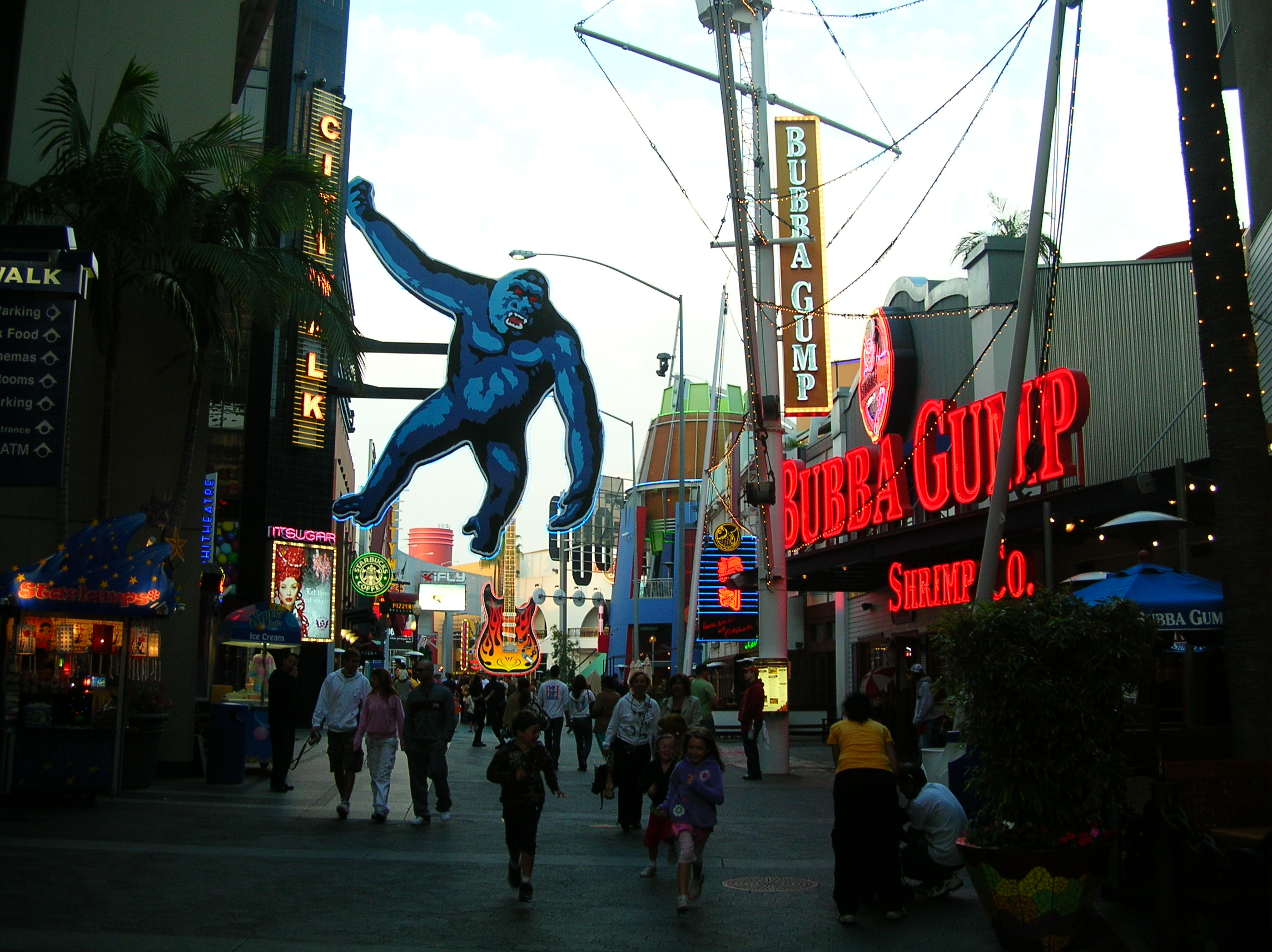
Concourse (June 2009)

Universal CityWalk is a three-block entertainment, dining, shopping promenade. It has over 30 eateries, a 19-screen AMC Theatres featuring IMAX, seven night spots, and over 30 stores. Universal CityWalk is adjacent to Universal Studios Hollywood and provides pedestrian access to the theme park from several of its parking structures. Its design was inspired by San Diego's Horton Plaza and incorporates architecture styles found all over Los Angeles.

CityWalk's central plaza is topped by a 170 feet (52 m) radial trellis designed and built by Pearce Structures. The courtyard features a leaping fountain, created by WET.

== History ==
=== Background ===
In 1969, construction started on a standalone amphiteatre adjacent to Universal Studios Hollywood. The amphitheater was built as a daytime arena where patrons of the Universal Studios Studio Tour could watch stuntmen perform a western-themed stunt show and shootout. On June 28, 1972, the Universal Amphitheatre opened and hosted its first concert, a production of the Broadway rock musical Jesus Christ Superstar. The show was extended until cold weather forced its closure. The venue underwent a major renovation and enclosure in 1982, and was demolished in September 2013.

On June 30, 1987, an 18-screen, 6,000-seat movie theater opened under the Cineplex Odeon Corporation brand, known as Cineplex Odeon Universal City Cinemas. At the time of its opening, the cinema was the largest movie theater complex in the United States.

=== 1988–1993: Development and opening ===
In 1988, the MCA Development Company hired architect Jon Jerde and his firm, The Jerde Partnership, to design CityWalk. The firm was known for designing San Diego's Horton Plaza and other urban retail centers. Jim Nelson, MCA's director of planning and development, promoted a process called "democratic design", in which tenants intentionally design exaggerated, colorful, three-dimensional facades that reflected Los Angeles architecture.

During the planing process, MCA executives consulted local city officials and nearby neighborhood groups about tenant selection. Early tenants included UCLA Extension, the Upstart Crow bookstore, and The Nature Company. Jerde's master plan called for an open-air promenade consisting of eight structures and 27 distinct facades.

On May 24 to 25, 1993, the 390,000-square-foot (36,000 m^{2}) Universal CityWalk celebrated its grand opening with a star-studded, red-carpet gala, and the appearance of celebrities, local media, and executives. The complex was built adjacent to both Universal Studios Hollywood and the Cineplex theater, and incorporated the Universal Amphitheatre. Early tenants included Things From Another World, Wolfgang Puck's Pizza Cafe, Sam Goody, and the B.B. King's Blues Club.

==== City Wok v. MCA Inc. ====
MCA chose to call the planned shopping center and entertainment complex "Universal CityWalk". However, in 1989, Stuart Davis opened a restaurant on Lankershim Boulevard called City Wok, which was less than two miles from Universal Studios Hollywood. The "City Wok" name was trademarked in February 1991. The owner of City Wok, Hu-Yu Inc., filed a lawsuit against MCA for trademark infringement, arguing that the names "CityWalk" and "City Wok" sounded phonically similar, causing public confusion; they sought $10 million in punitive damages. A U.S. District Court judge initially barred MCA from using the standalone "CityWalk" name, though MCA bypassed this by arguing their intention was always to market the complex under the full "Universal CityWalk" name.

In early 1993, U.S. District Judge William Rea issued a tentative ruling stating he was inclined to find MCA in civil contempt for continuing to use the standalone "CityWalk" name in promotional materials. An out-of-court settlement was made in March of that year, allowing MCA to continue using the CityWalk name, though the exact financial terms or payouts in the settlement were never publicly disclosed.

=== 1996–2011: Early years ===
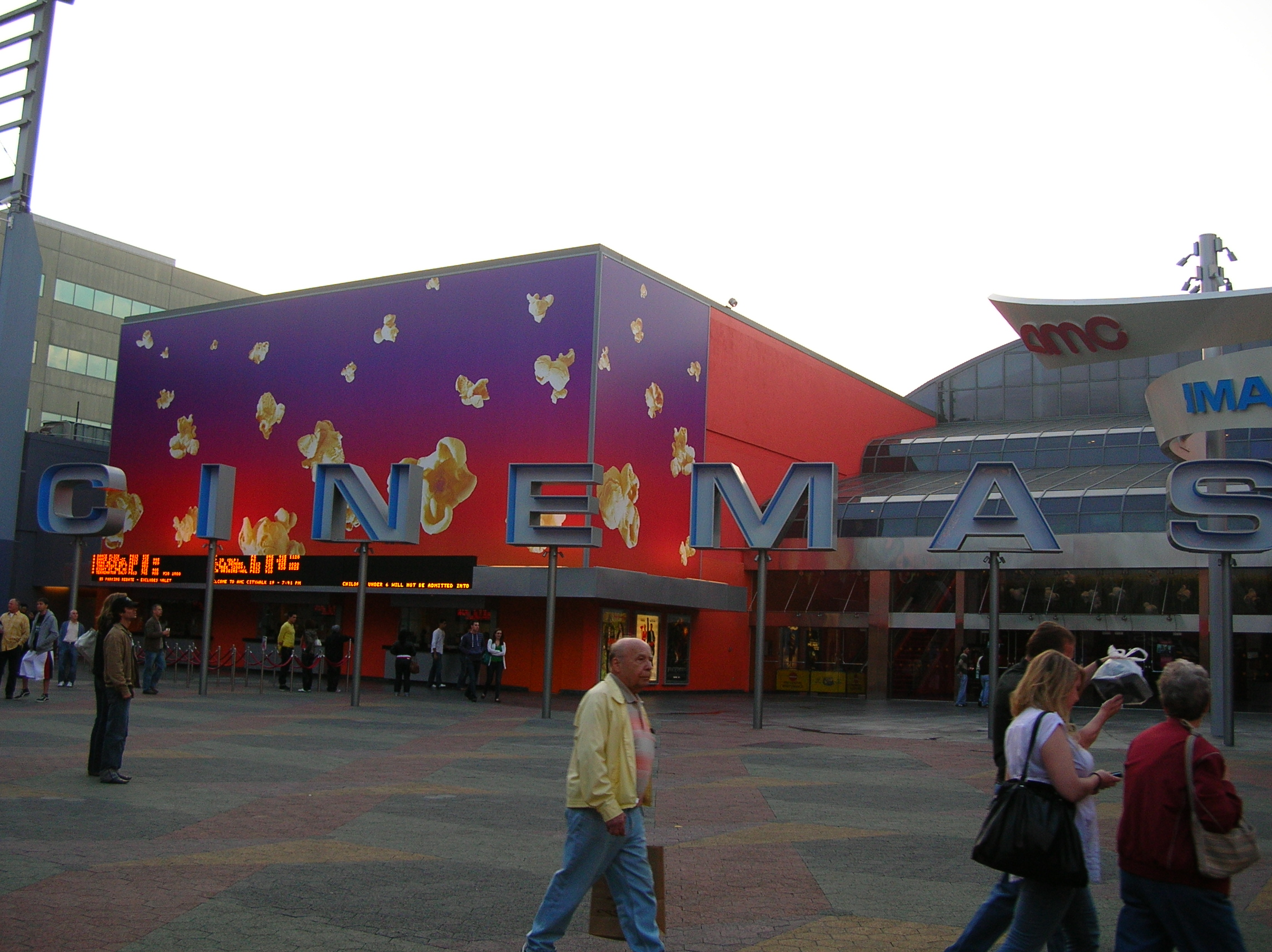
AMC Universal CityWalk Stadium 19 (June 2009)

On January 12, 1996, Hard Rock Cafe opened at CityWalk.

In January 2000, Seagram Company, which acquired Universal, and the Jerde Partnership, announced a $1 billion expansion that would add 93,000 square feet (8,600 m^{2}) to Universal CityWalk, increasing the number of total venues from 40 to 65. The expansion wing was slated to open on April 12, 2000. New entertainment anchors included an IMAX 3D Theater, which expanded the existing Cineplex Odeon, the NASCAR Silicon Motor Speedway, a Latin dance club known as the Rhumba Room, and Jillian's Hi-Life Lanes. The Howl at the Moon piano bar also debuted, alongside express versions of Jerry's Famous Deli, Versailles, and Gaucho Grill.

In late January 2006, AMC Theatres acquired Loews Cineplex Entertainment, (Note: The company formed in 1998 when Universal's Cineplex Odeon merged with Sony's Loews Theatres.) and the Cineplex Odeon theater was rebranded AMC Universal CityWalk Stadium 19. Bubba Gump Shrimp Co., based on the 1994 film Forrest Gump, would open a 300-seat restaurant on August 26, 2006 as their 22nd location, taking over a 9,500 sq ft (880 m^{2}) space previously occupied by Gladstones Universal. iFLY Hollywood opened in late November 2007. On May 29, 2009, the Jon Lovitz Comedy Club opened in the former three-story space of the B.B. King's Blues Club. In January 2010, the music video for Justin Bieber's song "Baby" was recorded at CityWalk.

The Infusion Lounge signed a lease in 2010 to replace the aging Rhumba Room venue. The replacement would utilize a two-story, 9,000 sq ft (840 m^{2}) space, and would have its grand opening on August 18, 2011.

=== 2011–2019: Tenant changes ===
Hard Rock Cafe entrance and Frankenstein guitar (August 2014)

"5 Towers", an interactive outdoor concert venue, would open on July 1, 2011, featuring a technologically advanced staging system. The stage would be equipped with thousands of LED fixtures, motion capture sensors, five soaring 42-foot light tower sculptures, and a massive video monitor.

In November 2011, a 50-foot (600 in) neon guitar modeled after Eddie Van Halen's "Frankenstein" Fender Stratocaster was installed outside the entrance of the Hard Rock Cafe. Van Halen himself posed next to the replica of his guitar on December 9, 2012. In April 2013, the Universal Amphitheatre, now called the Gibson Amphitheatre, announced that it would permanently close its doors in September 2013, to undergo demolition. The closure was because NBCUniversal did not renew its lease with concert promoter Live Nation, and partnered with Warner Bros. Entertainment to open The Wizarding World of Harry Potter, which opened at Universal Studios Hollywood on April 7, 2016.

Universal Cinema (March 2026)

Around late December 2016, the AMC movie theater undergone a multimillion-dollar renovation as Universal Cinema - an AMC Theatre, or simply Universal Cinema. A seven-story IMAX theater with dual 4K laser projection, Dolby Atmos sound across all screens, and Christie RGB laser projection was added, alongside a second-story bar called The Director's Lounge. On February 9, 2017, Jimmy Buffett's Margaritaville held a soft opening, followed by a grand opening on March 30, 2017, in the former Jillian's space. The opening was marked by a live performance from Jimmy Buffett and the Coral Reefer Band.

=== 2019–present ===
Toothsome Chocolate Emporium entrance (July 2023)

Howl at the Moon announced in late September 2019 that they would be relocating to 6356 Hollywood Boulevard.

Hard Rock Cafe would permanently close its doors on January 8, 2020, after Universal refused to renew its lease. Hard Rock Cafe was replaced by a new restaurant known as the Toothsome Chocolate Emporium & Savory Feast Kitchen, which was originally slated to open in 2021. However, the COVID-19 pandemic stalled construction, and Universal Studios Hollywood and Universal CityWalk were ultimately closed temporarily by Universal Parks & Resorts (Note: Former name of Universal Destinations & Experiences.) in the spring of 2020. Toothsome Chocolate Emporium had its grand opening on January 27, 2023.

On July 13, 2021, NBC Sports Grill & Brew opened at CityWalk. In January 2025, Universal announced an aggressive expansion and transformation of CityWalk, demolishing the former iFLY and closing several restaurants and stores in favor of new tenants such as Hello Kitty and Friends Cafe & Sanrio Smile Shop and Insomnia Cookies.

== Gallery ==
iFLY Hollywood vertical wind tunnel (June 2009)

Entrance to the Super Nintendo World store (July 2023)

Concourse at night (December 2016)

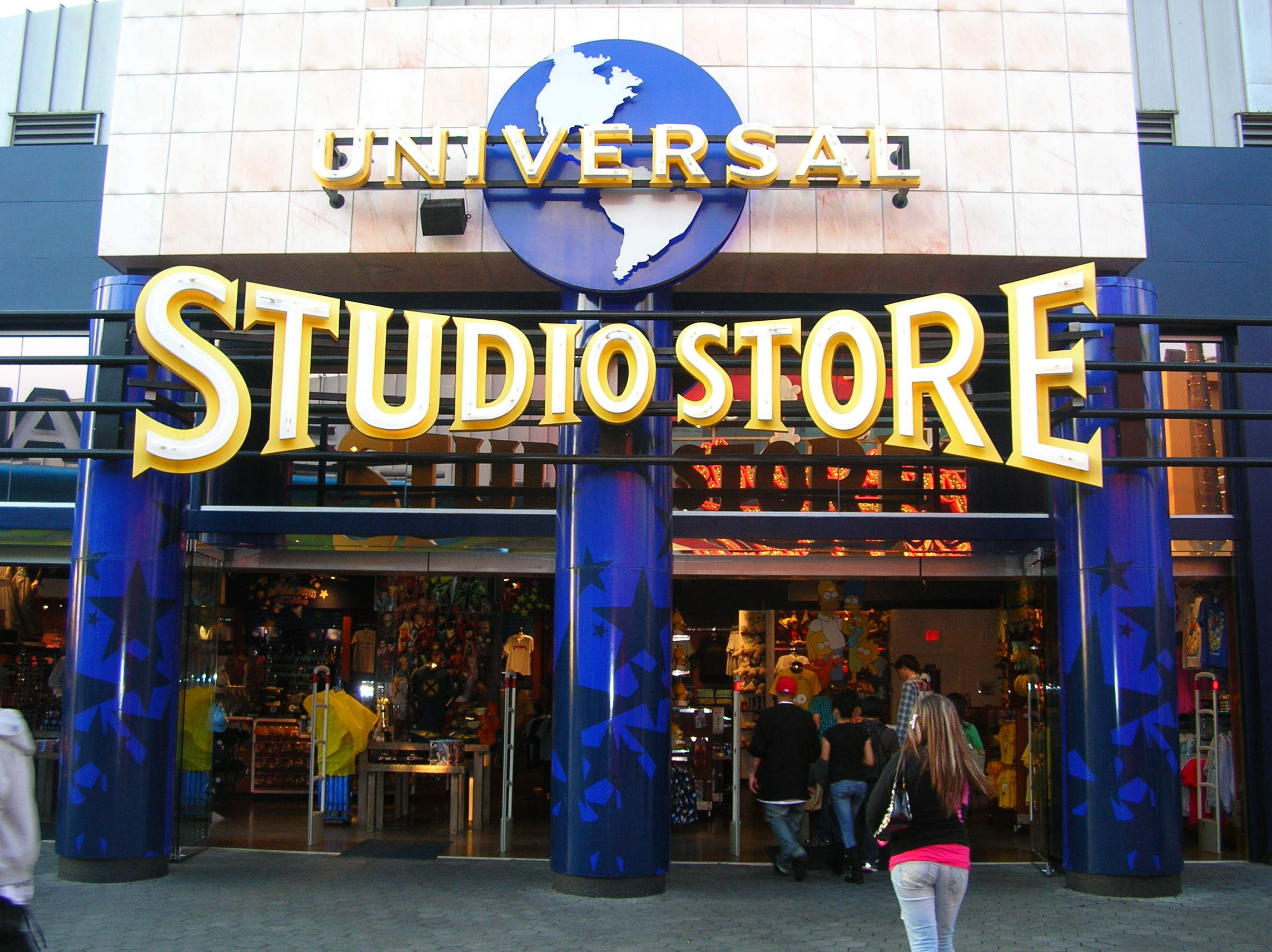
Universal Studio Store (June 2009)

Bubba Gump (July 2023)

== See also ==
- Downtown Disney
- Universal CityWalk Orlando
