= Universal City, California =

Unincorporated community in United States

- Unincorporated Area
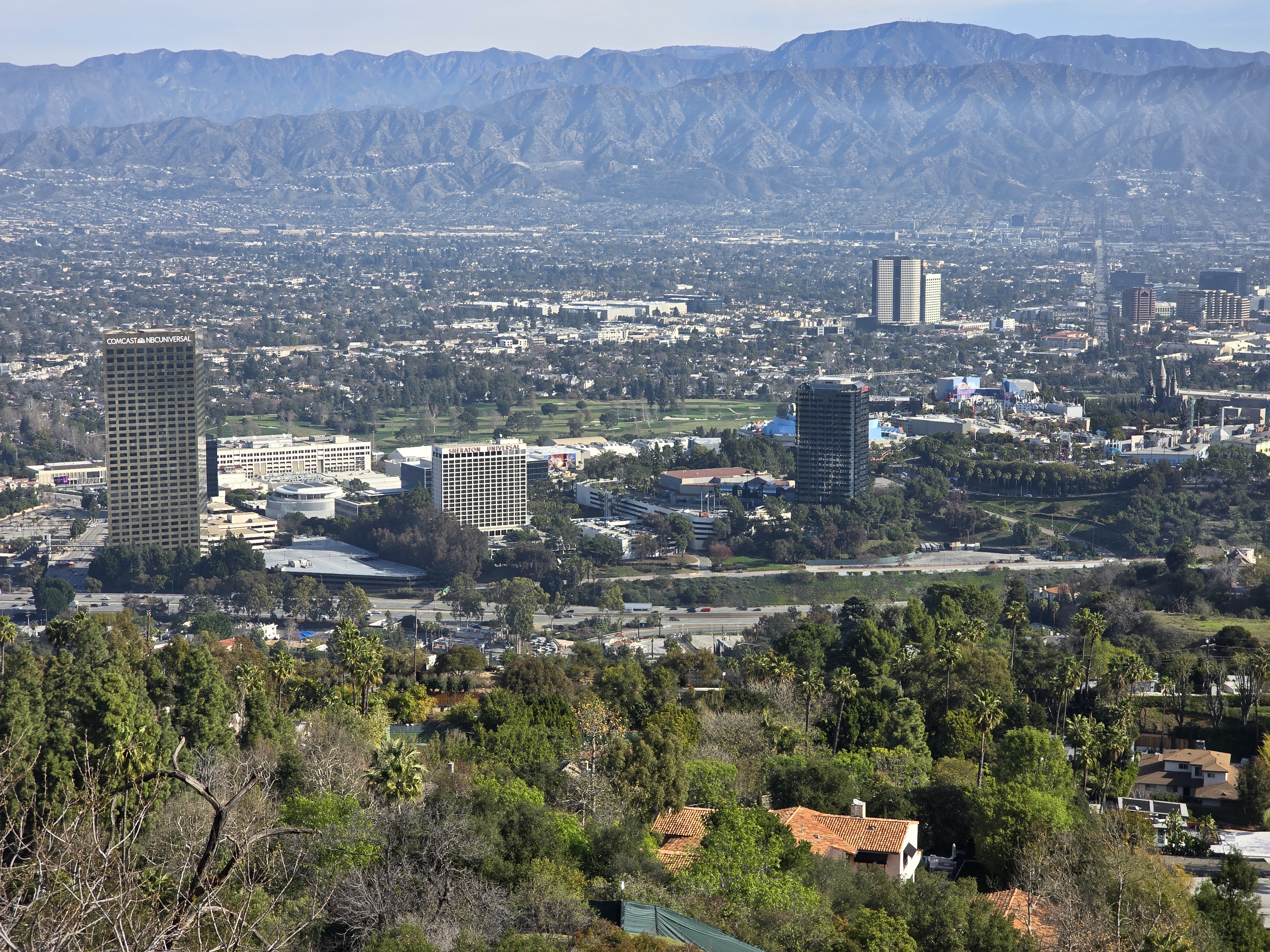
- Universal City as viewed from Briar Summit, February 2025
- Nickname: Universal Studios Complex
- Location within Los Angeles County

- Location in the United States
- Coordinates: 34°8′20″N 118°21′9″W
- Country: United States
- State: California
- County: Los Angeles
- Named for: Universal Studios Hollywood

Population (2000)
  - Total: 18
- Time zone: UTC-8 (Pacific (PST))
  - Summer (DST): UTC-7 (PDT)
- ZIP code: 91608
- Area codes: 747/818
- FIPS code: 06-81232
- GNIS feature ID: 1661603

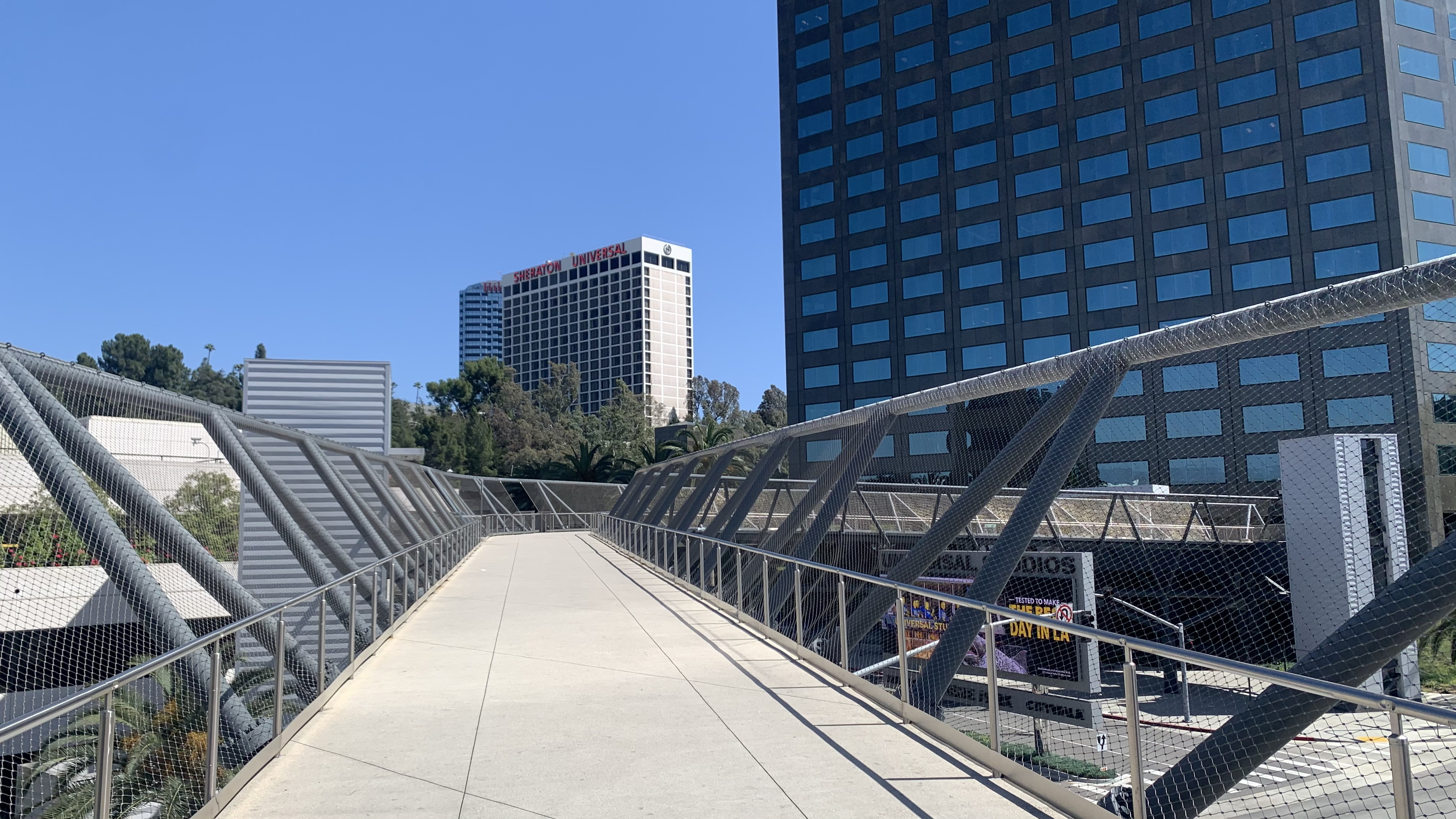
View of 10 Universal City Plaza alongside Universal Sheraton and Universal Hilton

Universal City is an unincorporated area in the San Fernando Valley of Los Angeles County, California, United States. Located approximately 2 miles (3.2 km) north of Hollywood and 10 miles (16 km) northwest of downtown Los Angeles, it is home to Universal Studios Hollywood, the Universal Studios Lot, and the Universal CityWalk shopping and entertainment center.

Universal City is almost entirely surrounded by the city of Los Angeles, with a small portion bordering the city of Burbank. Although several nearby hotels and office buildings are commonly associated with Universal City, they are located within Los Angeles city limits. Universal City's boundaries were adjusted in 2015 to align with historic and planned land use patterns, such as having the entire theme park within the unincorporated part of Universal City.

Universal City's ZIP code is 91608, and the community is served by area code 818.

== History ==
Carl Laemmle officially opened the Second Universal City (Lankershim Boulevard) on March 15, 1915, on the 230-acre (93 ha) Taylor Ranch property. At the launch event, in what is now the North Hollywood area, a crowd of men and women eagerly awaited the display of the film stages, daredevil stunt pilots and silent film idols, as well as the movie cameras Laemmle had brought along. "See how slapstick comedies are made. See your favorite screen stars do their work. See how we make the people laugh or cry or sit on the edge of their chairs the world over!" stated a poster touting Universal's opening. "C'mon out! Aw, c'mon!"

In 1950, Universal Studios Lot increased its overall size to approximately 391 acres after Universal acquired additional land at the southern border of the studio. Music Corporation of America (MCA) bought the Universal Studios Lot in 1958. Universal then leased back its property from MCA until MCA and Universal merged in 1962. The mountain portions above 600 feet (180 m) were not incorporated into studio use until MCA/Universal's master plan to level the hills and create the Universal Studio Tour Center and City Walk.

=== Fires ===
More than a half-dozen major fires have impacted the Universal Studios property (and, accordingly, Universal City) during its history. Major fires, specifically in 1990 and 2008, have also destroyed substantial portions of the backlot sets.

== Geography and land use ==
Approximately 323 acres (131 ha) of the 391-acre Universal Studios Complex (158 ha) is inside the Universal City unincorporated area, which is located 2 miles (3.2 km) north of Hollywood and 10 miles (16 km) northwest of downtown Los Angeles. The remaining acreage falls within the City of Los Angeles. Parts of what is commonly referred to as "Universal City" are officially within Los Angeles, including 10 Universal City Plaza (a 36-floor office building for Universal and NBC), the Sheraton Universal, and the Universal Hilton. The One Universal office building also falls within the City of Los Angeles following a 2015 annexation.

In January 2015, the boundaries of Universal City and Los Angeles were adjusted as part of Reorganization 2014-01, where some unincorporated areas were annexed into the city of Los Angeles, and other areas were detached from the city of Los Angeles and unincorporated. The changes were intended to align jurisdictional boundaries with existing and planned land use patterns, such as placing the entire theme park, studio lot, and CityWalk shopping district within the unincorporated part of Universal City.

In 2013, NBCUniversal released the NBCUniversal Evolution Plan, which was a blueprint for the 391-acre Universal City Lot and was approved by both the City and County of Los Angeles. The plan informally divides the unincorporated Universal City into four districts: the Business District, the Entertainment District, the Studio District, and the Back Lot District. However, the plan acknowledged that the uses of each district blended together, with an overlap between the Studio and Back Lot Districts, the intermingling of uses between the Studio District and the Entertainment District through the Studio Tour.

== Climate ==
Universal City, California has a hot semi-arid climate (BSh).

Climate data for Universal City, California
Month	Jan	Feb	Mar	Apr	May	Jun	Jul	Aug	Sep	Oct	Nov	Dec	Year
Record high °F (°C)	91 (33)	91 (33)	94 (34)	103 (39)	100 (38)	108 (42)	114 (46)	108 (42)	111 (44)	103 (39)	99 (37)	94 (34)	114 (46)
Mean daily maximum °F (°C)	66.9 (19.4)	67.3 (19.6)	69.2 (20.7)	72.0 (22.2)	74.9 (23.8)	79.1 (26.2)	84.7 (29.3)	86.3 (30.2)	84.3 (29.1)	78.6 (25.9)	72.4 (22.4)	66.5 (19.2)	75.2 (24.0)
Mean daily minimum °F (°C)	45.6 (7.6)	46.4 (8.0)	48.4 (9.1)	51.1 (10.6)	55.2 (12.9)	58.7 (14.8)	62.4 (16.9)	62.9 (17.2)	61.1 (16.2)	55.7 (13.2)	49.2 (9.6)	44.9 (7.2)	53.5 (11.9)
Record low °F (°C)	29 (−2)	33 (1)	34 (1)	37 (3)	42 (6)	44 (7)	51 (11)	50 (10)	47 (8)	40 (4)	33 (1)	25 (−4)	25 (−4)
Average precipitation inches (mm)	3.99 (101)	4.54 (115)	3.95 (100)	0.99 (25)	0.38 (9.7)	0.08 (2.0)	0.02 (0.51)	0.17 (4.3)	0.32 (8.1)	0.59 (15)	1.37 (35)	2.22 (56)	18.62 (473)

== Government and infrastructure ==
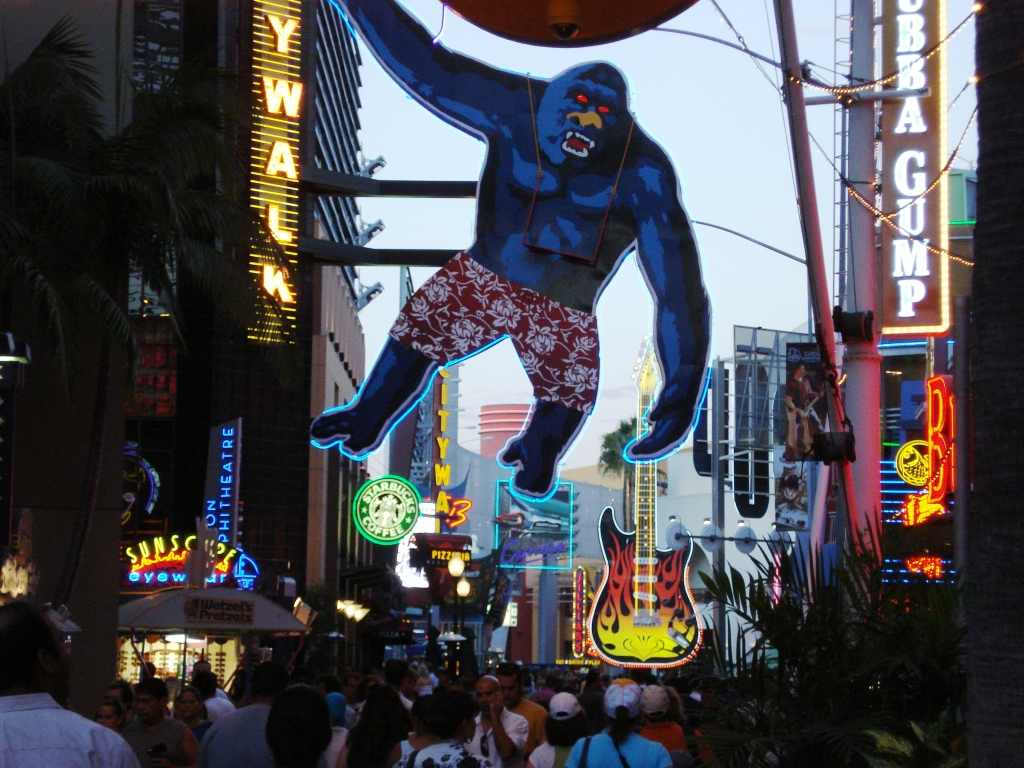
Universal CityWalk in Universal City

Fire protection in Universal City is provided by the Los Angeles County Fire Department (LACFD). The LACFD operates Station #51 at 3900 Lankershim Boulevard as a part of Battalion 1.

The Los Angeles County Sheriff's Department (LASD) operates the West Hollywood Station in West Hollywood, serving Universal City. In addition, the department operates the substation at Universal CityWalk in Universal City. Prior to the summer of 1991, the West Hollywood Station handled all calls for police service from Universal City. In the summer of 1991, the LASD established the substation in a trailer in the parking lot of the studio tour and remained in the area until two years later, when the substation was moved into a permanent location in the CityWalk theme mall when it opened. The Los Angeles Police Department (LAPD) also shares jurisdiction with the LASD in providing protection to Universal City, operating the North Hollywood Community Police Station in North Hollywood, whose responsibilities include Universal City.

The Los Angeles County Fire Department (LACFD) Station 51, located on studio property in Universal City, is of special significance to Universal, as "Station 51" was the fictional setting of the Universal and Jack Webb television series Emergency! The current Station 51 was not used for external shots, or used as a model for the interior shots seen on the show (LACFD Station 127 in Carson was used).

== Transportation ==
The area is served by the Universal City / Studio City station of the Metro B Line, which is located in the City of Los Angeles and located opposite 10 Universal Plaza.
