= 10 Universal City Plaza =

Skyscraper in Universal City, California

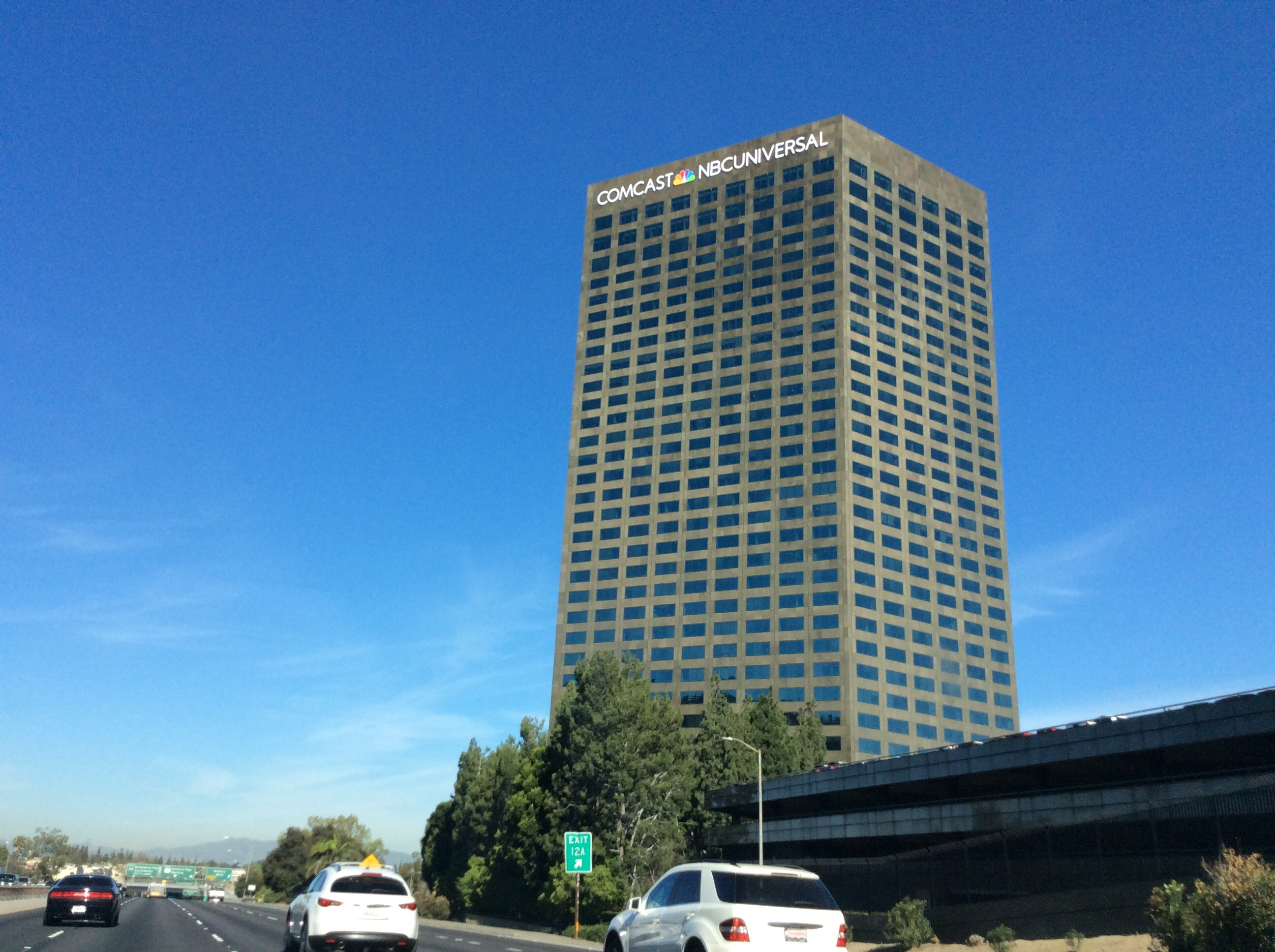
- Alternative names: 10 UCP; Getty Oil Building; MCA-Getty Building

General information
- Status: Completed
- Type: Commercial offices
- Location: 10 Universal City Plaza; Universal City, California
- Coordinates: 34.13802°N 118.3616°W
- Current tenants: NBCUniversal; Universal Pictures; NBC; Bravo
- Completed: 1984
- Owner: Comcast
- Operator: Comcast; NBCUniversal; Universal Filmed Entertainment Group

Height
- Roof: 506.0 ft (154.23 m)

Technical details
- Floor count: 35
- Floor area: 820,000 sq ft (76,180 m^{2})

Design and construction
- Architect: Skidmore, Owings & Merrill
- Main contractor: Hathaway Dinwiddie

Other information
- Public transit: Universal City/Studio City

10 Universal City Plaza (10 UCP) is a 36-story, 506.0-foot (154.23 m) rhombic skyscraper in Universal City, California, near Los Angeles. It is the headquarters of Universal Filmed Entertainment Group. The tower was completed in 1984 by Hathaway Dinwiddie to a design by Skidmore, Owings & Merrill, and contains 820,000 square feet (76,000 square meters) of office space. It is the tallest building in the San Fernando Valley.

French conglomerate Vivendi Universal sold the building to CarrAmerica Realty Corporation and Beacon Capital Partners in 2003, for $190 million. CarrAmerica have owned 80% of this building, while Vivendi and NBCUniversal owned the remainder. The building was sold to Broadway Partners in December 2006. The firm lost control of the building in March 2008 in an auction to a partnership between Normandy Real Estate Partners and Five Mile Capital Partners for $306 million after Broadway failed to service its massive debt load.

On October 3, 2013, it was reported by the Los Angeles Times that NBCUniversal's parent company Comcast Corporation had purchased the building for about $420 million.

== Tenants ==
The building was originally built to be the headquarters of Getty Oil. When Getty was acquired by Texaco in 1984/1985, the building housed the West Coast offices of that company for several years until that company merged with Shell, into Equiva/Equilon/Motiva and relocated their headquarters. MCA bought the building that year, and used it to house Universal Pictures. Ever since NBCUniversal was founded in August 2004, the building has also been home to the company's Cable Entertainment properties including Esquire Network, Bravo, Universal Cable Productions, and Wilshire Studios. Other NBCU businesses such as Universal Pictures Home Entertainment and its former joint venture with Warner Bros. Home Entertainment, Studio Distribution Services, HRConnection, and corporate functions are also housed here.

The property is home to The Terrace Studios at 10UCP, a broadcast facility housing two sound stages and their accompanying facilities. Entertainment news programs E! News, Access Hollywood and Access Daily began broadcasting from this facility in June 2015. The tower is home to the show's offices and newsroom facility. The tower is also home to the main studio for Universal Animation Studios, while the other studio is located on the Glendale campus of DreamWorks Animation.

== See also ==
- List of tallest buildings in Los Angeles
- Universal Studios Lot
