= Burbank Boulevard =

Arterial road in Los Angeles's San Fernando Valley

- Interactive map of Burbank Boulevard
- Namesake: David Burbank
- Maintained by: Bureau of Street Services, Los Angeles Department of Water and Power, City of Burbank
- Length: 17.5 mi (28.2 km)
- Nearest metro station: Valley College
- West end: Hidden Hills
- Major junctions: SR 27 gap in route I-405; SR 170; I-5
- East end: 3rd Street in downtown Burbank

Burbank Boulevard is a major east–west arterial road that runs for 17.5 miles (28.2 km) across the San Fernando Valley in Los Angeles and Burbank, California.

== Name ==
Burbank Boulevard was named after the City of Burbank, itself named for David Burbank, a dentist and rancher. Prior to 1924, Burbank Boulevard was known as Central Avenue.

== Route ==
Burbank Boulevard travels east–west across almost the entire San Fernando Valley. A gap in Woodland Hills and Tarzana breaks the road into two parts: a 4 mile section to the west and a 13.5 mile section to the east. The western section starts at the entrance to Hidden Hills and travels through most of Woodland Hills, while the eastern section travels from Tarzana, through Encino, Sherman Oaks, Valley Village, North Hollywood, and into Burbank.

The street is four lanes or more for almost its entire length. The road slightly turns at the Los Angeles/Burbank border, traveling east–west in Los Angeles and east-northeast west-southwest in Burbank.

== Transit ==
Metro Local Line 237 runs along Burbank Boulevard between Sherman Oaks and North Hollywood. Metro Local Line 154 and Burbank Bus's Orange Route run along Burbank Boulevard between North Hollywood and Burbank.

The G Line's Valley College station is located at Burbank Boulevard and Fulton Avenue in Sherman Oaks.

== Notable landmarks ==
Notable landmarks on Burbank Boulevard include (from west to east): Kaiser Permanente Woodland Hills Medical Center, Warner Center Corporate Park, Providence Tarzana Medical Center, Sepulveda Recreation Area, Balboa Golf Course, KSPN (AM) radio towers, and the North Hollywood Police Station.

Schools on Burbank Boulevard include (from west to east): El Camino Real Charter High School, Woodland Hills Academy, Los Angeles Valley College, Burbank Boulevard Elementary, Citizens of the World Charter School, and Burbank High School.
