= NoHo Arts District, Los Angeles =

Coordinates: 34°10′20″N 118°22′41″W

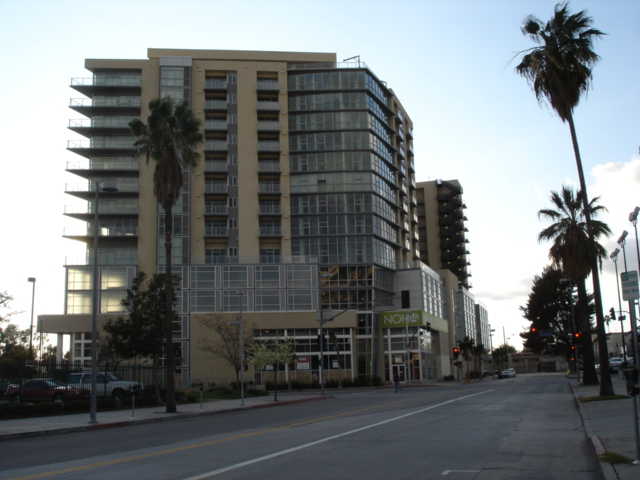
New condominium buildings along a Cumpston street

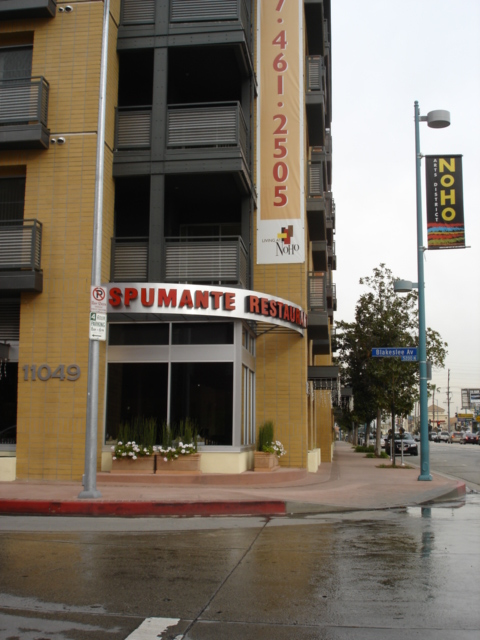
Mixed-use apartment and restaurant on Magnolia Boulevard

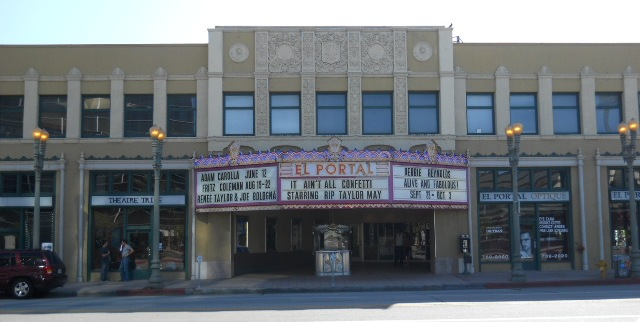
El Portal Theater on Lankershim Boulevard

The NoHo Arts District is a community in North Hollywood, Los Angeles, California, that is home to contemporary theaters, art galleries, cafes, and shops. The community is generally bounded by Hatteras Street to the north, Cahuenga Boulevard to the east, Tujunga Avenue to the west, and Camarillo Street to the south. The area features more than twenty professional theaters, producing new work and classics, diverse art galleries, public art, and professional dance studios. The district also features the largest concentration of music recording venues west of the Mississippi. A Metro Rail station is located here, the North Hollywood station of the B Line and serves as the terminus of the Metro G Line busway.

Business and theater owners in the Universal City/North Hollywood Chamber of Commerce established a theater and arts district in 1992 with support from the Los Angeles Department of Cultural Affairs. They chose "NoHo", a play off the well-known SoHo Arts District neighborhood of New York City.

The NoHo Arts District, in conjunction with greater North Hollywood, is being transformed into a regional center, in large part as a result of the construction of Metro Stations for the B Line and the G Line, two lines that have made the neighborhood into a regional hub for the San Fernando Valley. Medium- and high-density developments are being built around the Metro Station, making the Arts District a center of citywide development, with the intent of creating a walkable urban village. North Hollywood's landscape (and the Art's District as a result) has been transformed in recent years, with condominium towers (including a fifteen-story building on Lankershim Boulevard being built in the midst of older one-story bungalows and small apartment complexes.

The theater district includes two new large venues that expand upon existing theaters, the redesigned NoHo Arts Center (formerly the American Renegade Theatre) and the redesigned El Portal Theatre. They add to the existing 31 theaters located in and around the NoHo Arts District. NoHo Commons, developed by J.H. Snyder Company, is located near the NoHo Arts District's commercial core and subway station. The $100-million, 292-unit loft apartment project by Snyder was the first segment to be completed of NoHo Commons, part of a "transit village" taking form at the terminus of the Metro B Line subway and the G Line busway. The NoHo Commons construction and development consisted of three phases, completing with the construction of a Laemmle Theatre. Phase III also consisted of the construction of an eight-story office on the corner of Lankershim Boulevard and Weddington in 2009. The building's primary tenant is currently the Art Institute of California-Hollywood. NoHo 14, a 180-unit, fourteen-story apartment building, was built in 2004 as one of the first large-scale developments in the neighborhood.

The historic North Hollywood train depot at Lankershim and Chandler Boulevards was restored in 2014 for $3.6 million. It is a Southern Pacific Railroad standard design, a One Story Combination Depot No. 15 or 21. The train depot, dating to 1896, sits on land owned by the Los Angeles County Metropolitan Transportation Authority, across from the Metro B Line subway station and next to the terminus of the G Line bus line.

Currently the NoHo Arts District, in conjunction with the Community Redevelopment Agency-Los Angeles, is working on beautification efforts to make the area more appealing to businesses. The current focus is primarily on revamping store fronts on Lankershim Boulevard and Magnolia Boulevard with Burbank Boulevard to follow.

In the future, North Hollywood plans a $1 billion mixed-use development at Lankershim and Chandler, surrounding the Metro B and G line terminals. The project would re-develop 15.6 acres (6.3 ha) with 600,000 square feet (56,000 m^{2}) of commercial space and nearly 1500 residential units in three high-rise towers. The project was awarded to Trammell Crow Company and High Street Residential by the Los Angeles Metro board.
