= Riverside Drive (Los Angeles) =

Street in Los Angeles, California

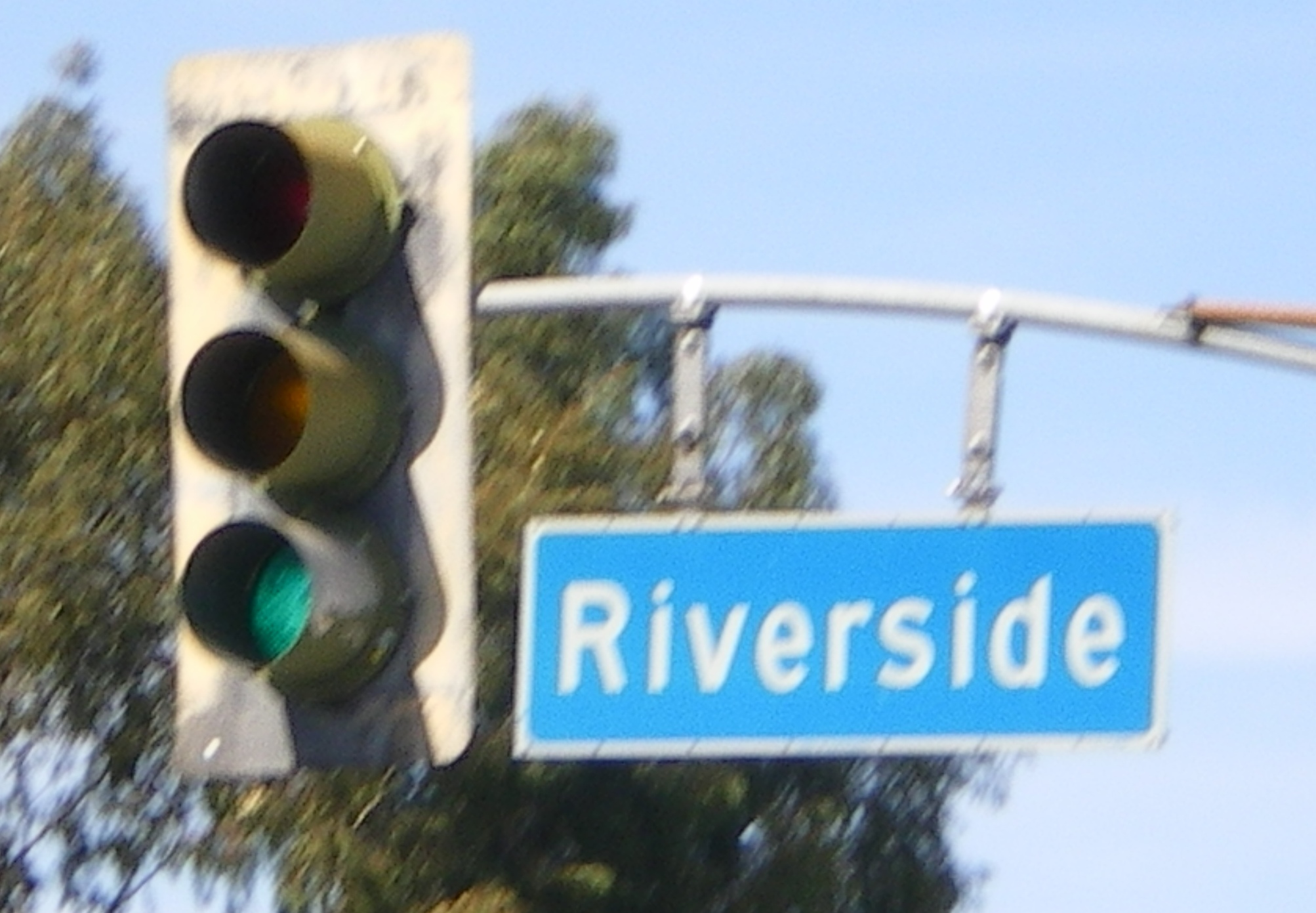
- Interactive map of Riverside Drive
- Maintained by: Bureau of Street Services, City of L.A. DPW
- Northwest end: Van Nuys Boulevard in Sherman Oaks34.1580°N 118.4486°W
- Major junctions: Coldwater Canyon Avenue in Studio City; Laurel Canyon Blvd in Studio City; SR 170 in Studio City; SR 134 in Studio City; SR 134 in Burbank; SR 134 at Griffith Park; Los Feliz Blvd. in Los Feliz; SR 2 in Silver Lake; I-5 in Elysian Park
- Southeast end: Figueroa Street & San Fernando Road in Cypress Park

Riverside Drive is a northeast–southwest street connecting the San Fernando Valley and the Cypress Park neighborhood of the City of Los Angeles, California. It follows the course of the Los Angeles River.

== Overview ==
Running approximately 20 miles (32 km) from Van Nuys Boulevard in Sherman Oaks to Figueroa Street and San Fernando Road in Cypress Park, it is one of the major thoroughfares in the San Fernando Valley. It runs through the heart of the Valley and is home to many of Southern California's major entertainment companies, passing both the Warner Bros. Studios and Walt Disney Studios in Burbank. Then it enters West Glendale and continues as a major thoroughfare until it intersects with Victory Boulevard and Sonora Avenue. It then continues as the major thoroughfare through Griffith Park, though its name changes as it passes through the park, first to Zoo Drive, then Crystal Springs Drive, and then Griffith Park Boulevard, before becoming Riverside Drive again as it leaves the park at its southeastern boundary. Riverside Drive then continues east and south along the Los Angeles River, passing just north of the Silver Lake Reservoir. It runs along the northern edge of Elysian Park, passing north of Dodger Stadium before becoming Figueroa Street at a roundabout with San Fernando Road just north of the confluence of Arroyo Seco and the Los Angeles River.

== Local transportation ==
Metro Local lines 155 and 296 operate on Riverside Drive.

== Cities and communities ==
Listed west to east, or north to south

- Sherman Oaks
- Studio City
- Valley Village
- Toluca Lake
- Burbank
- Glendale
- Silver Lake
- Los Feliz
- Elysian Park

== Notable places ==
Listed west to east, or north to south

- Los Angeles River
- Westfield Fashion Square, Sherman Oaks, California
- Notre Dame High School, Sherman Oaks, California
- North Hollywood Medical Center, North Hollywood, California, a former hospital used for the filming of the Scrubs TV series for its first eight seasons
- Oldest remaining Bob's Big Boy Restaurant
- Providence High School, Burbank, California
- Forest Lawn Memorial Park (nearby)
- Disney Channel Headquarters, Burbank, California
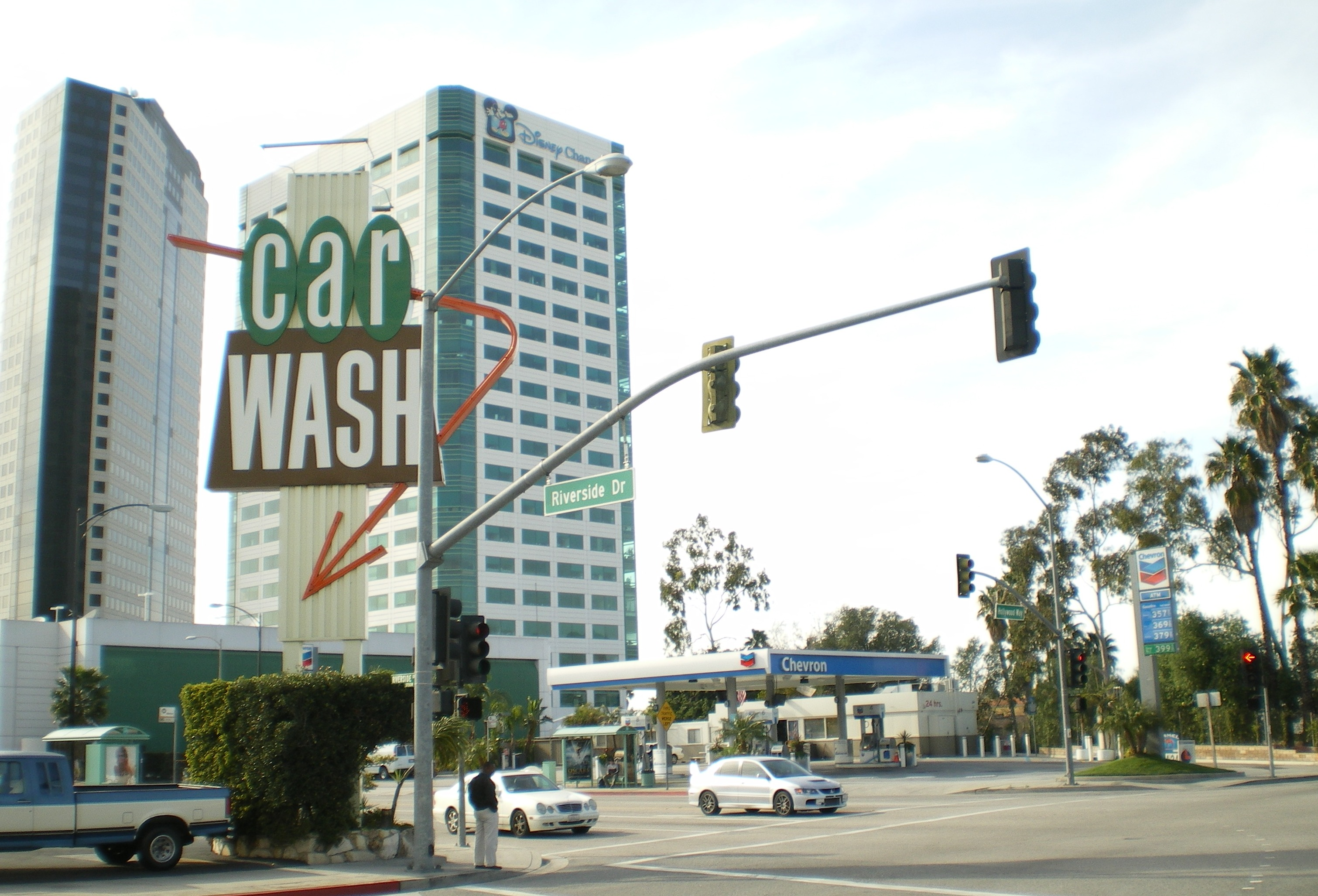
  Disney Channel Headquarters
- Warner Bros. Studios, Burbank, California
- Warner Records, Burbank, California
- Walt Disney Studios, Burbank, California
- ABC Studios, Burbank, California
- Walt Disney Animation Studios, Burbank, California
- Equidome
- Los Angeles Equestrian Center
- Los Angeles Zoo (Zoo Drive)
- Autry National Center (Zoo Drive)
- Griffith Park (Crystal Springs Drive, Griffith Park Boulevard)
- Griffith Observatory (nearby)
- Silver Lake Reservoir (nearby)
- Elysian Park, Los Angeles, California
- Dodger Stadium (nearby)

== Gallery ==
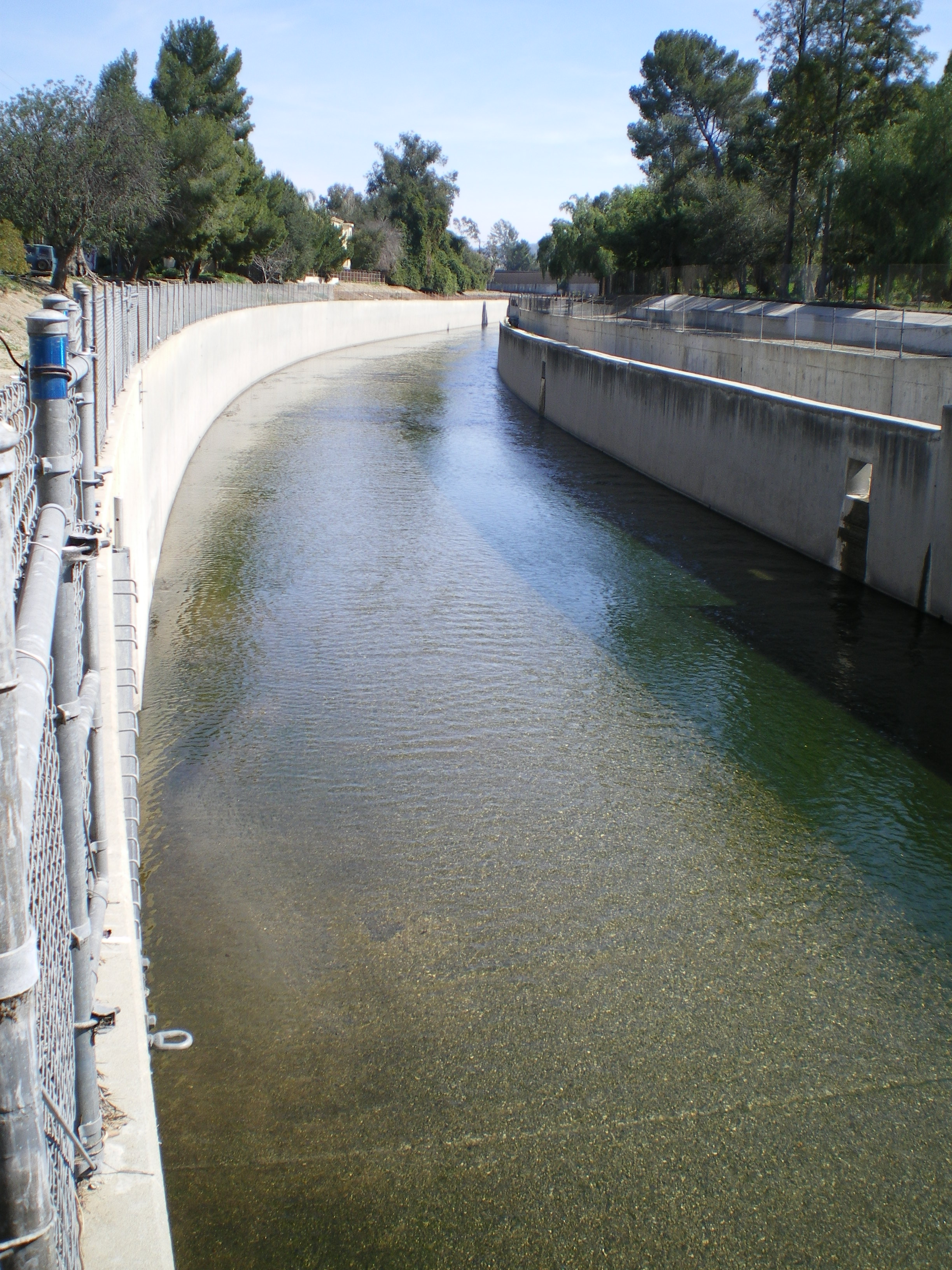
Adjacent Los Angeles River in Sherman Oaks

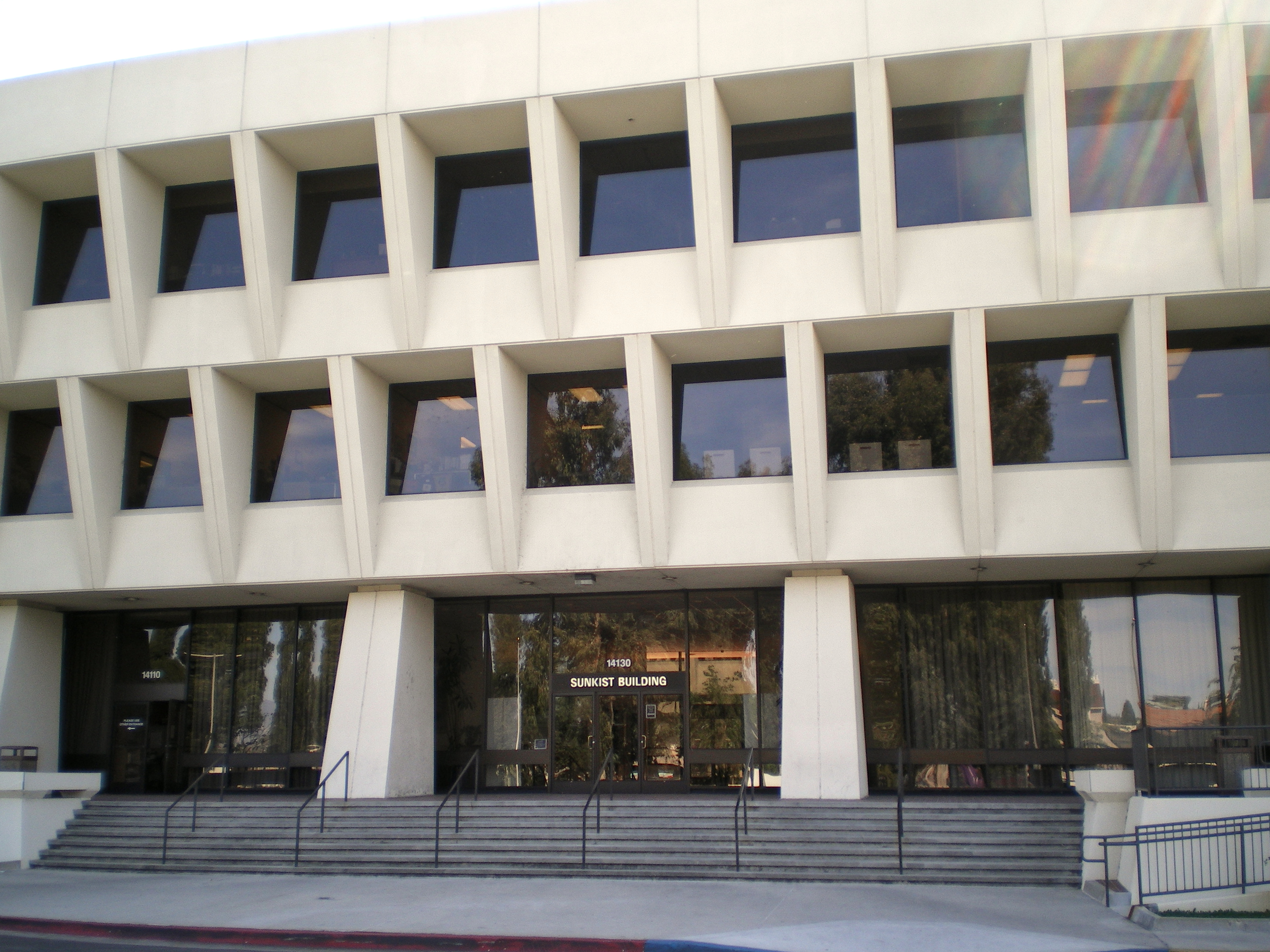
Sunkist Building, Sherman Oaks

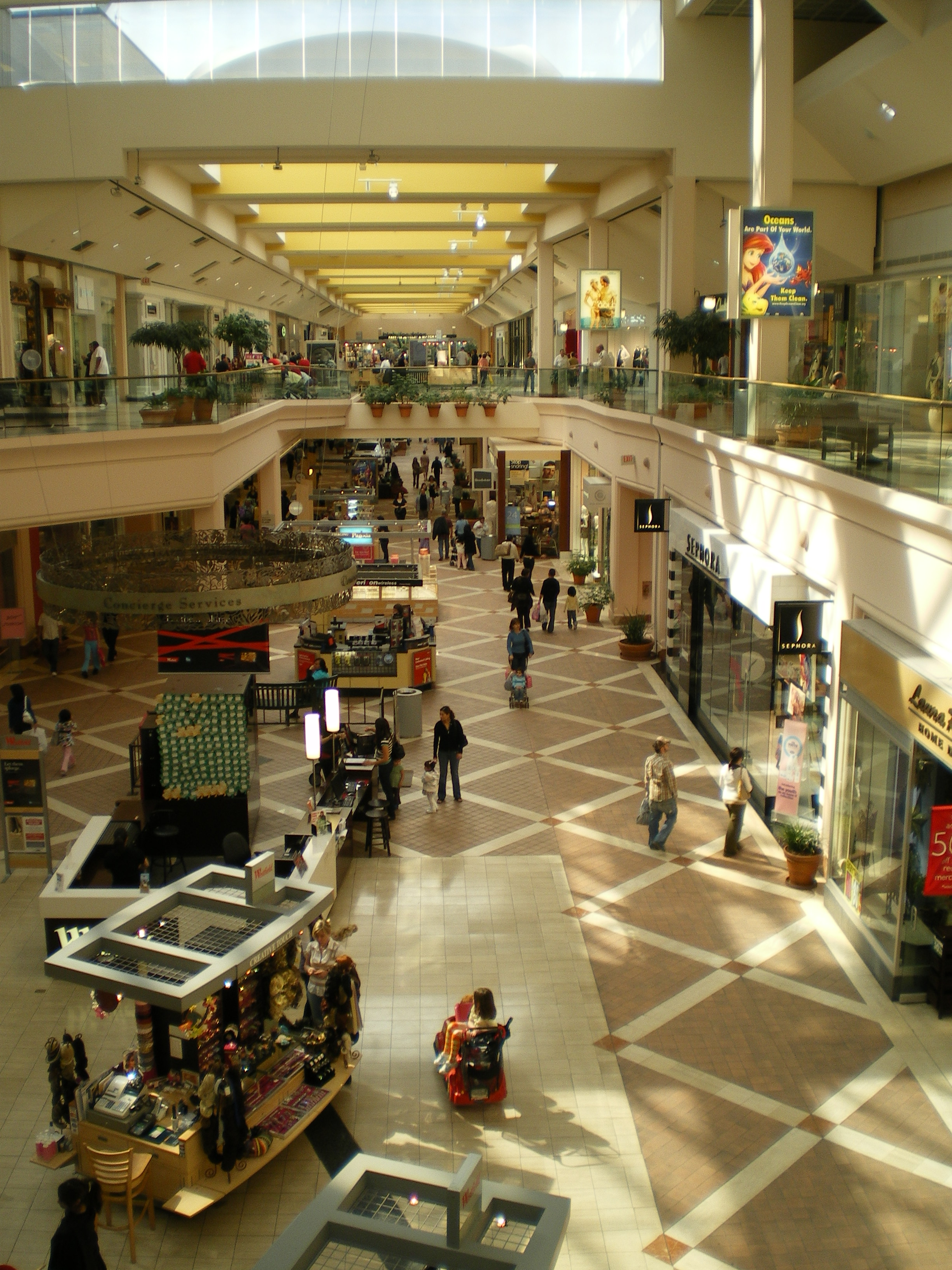
Westfield Fashion Square in Sherman Oaks

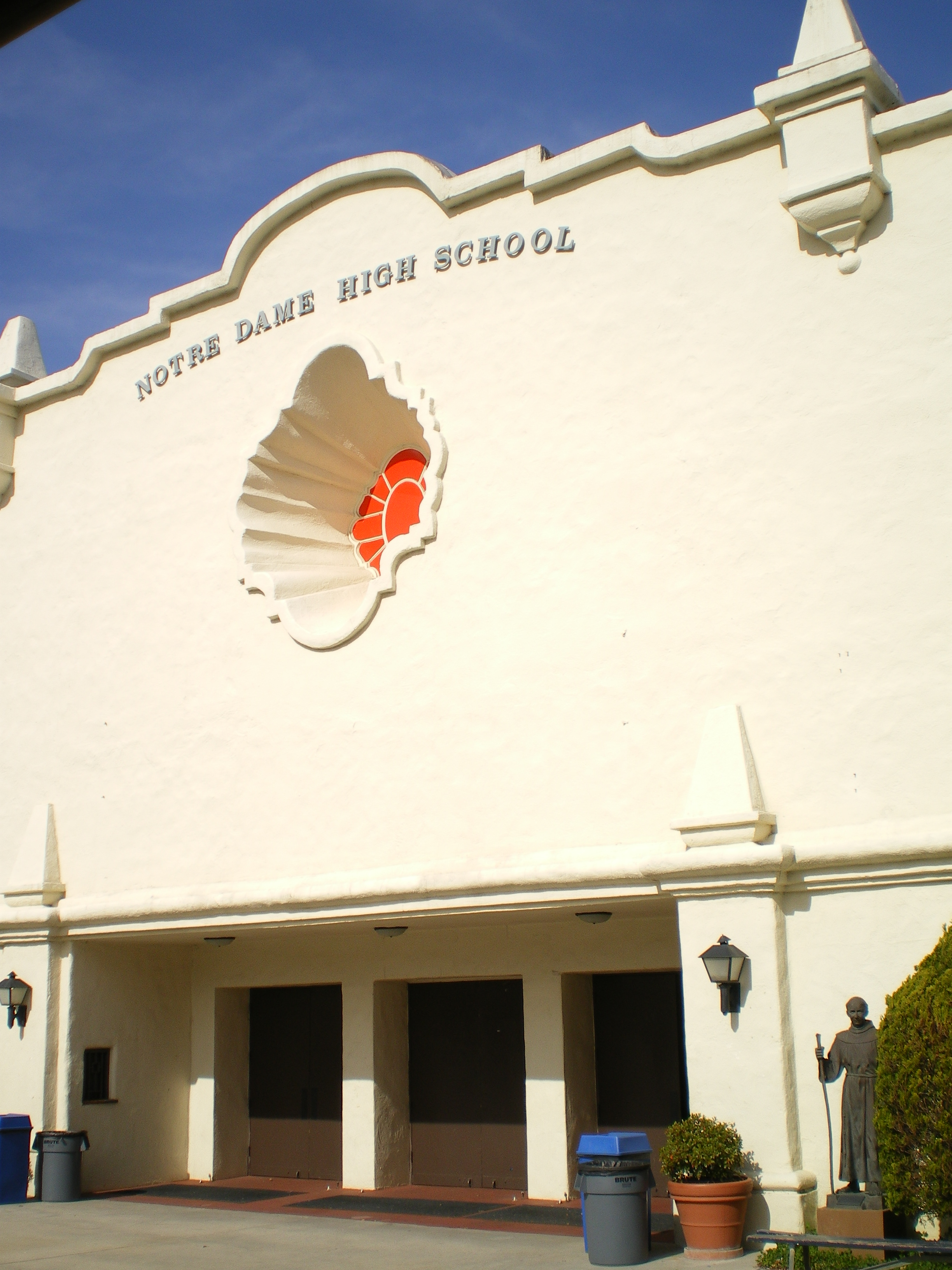
Notre Dame High School, Sherman Oaks

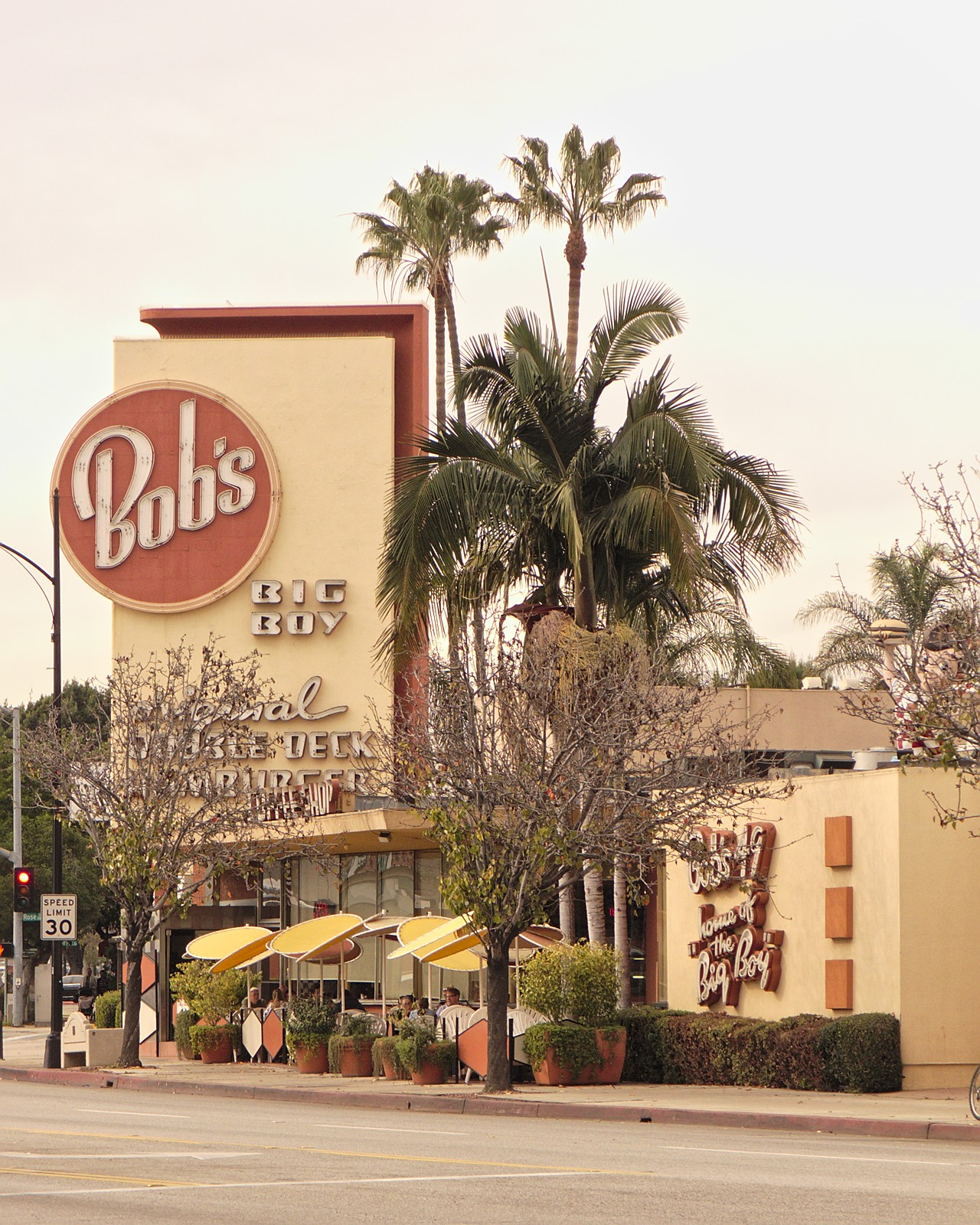
Bob's Big Boy in Burbank

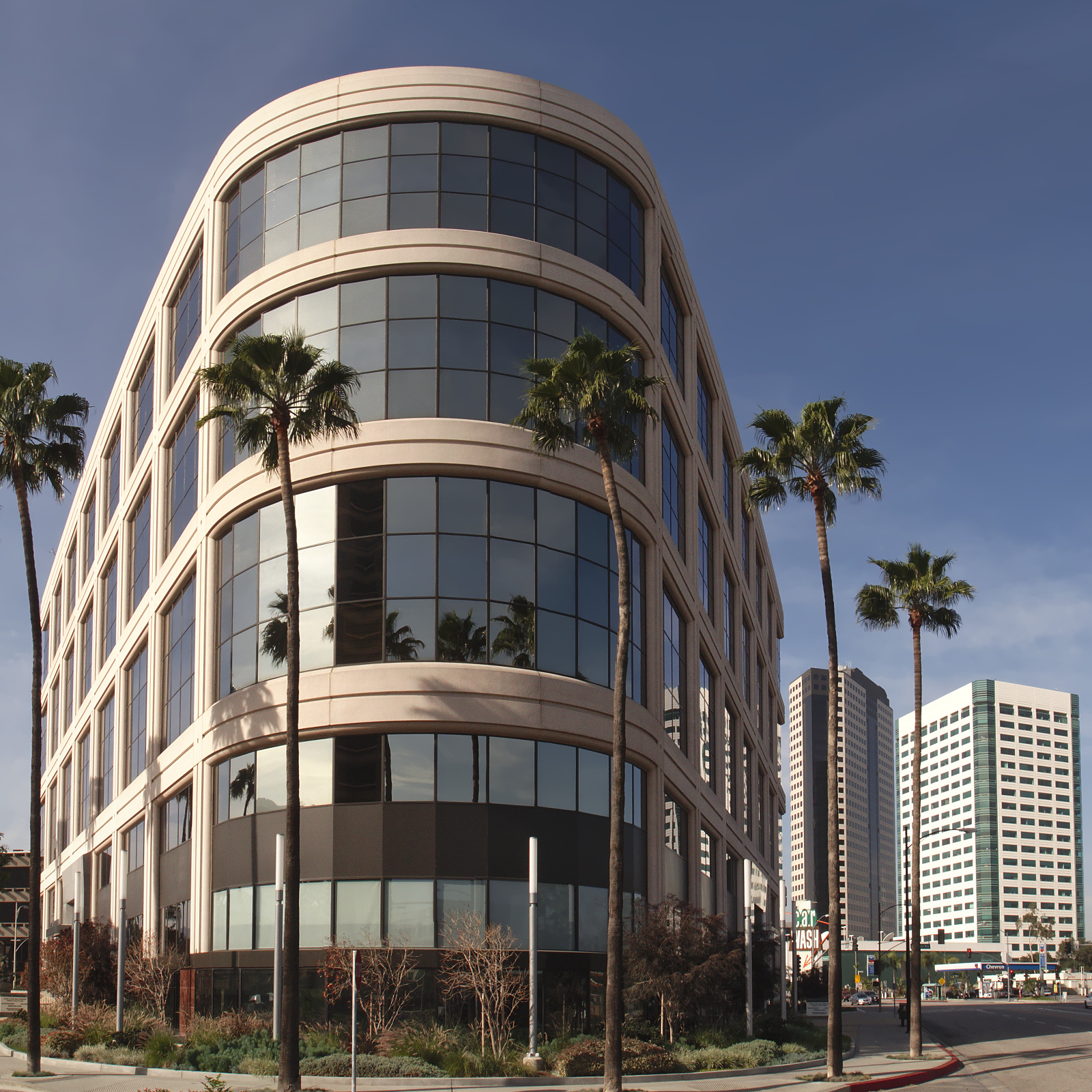
Burbank media district

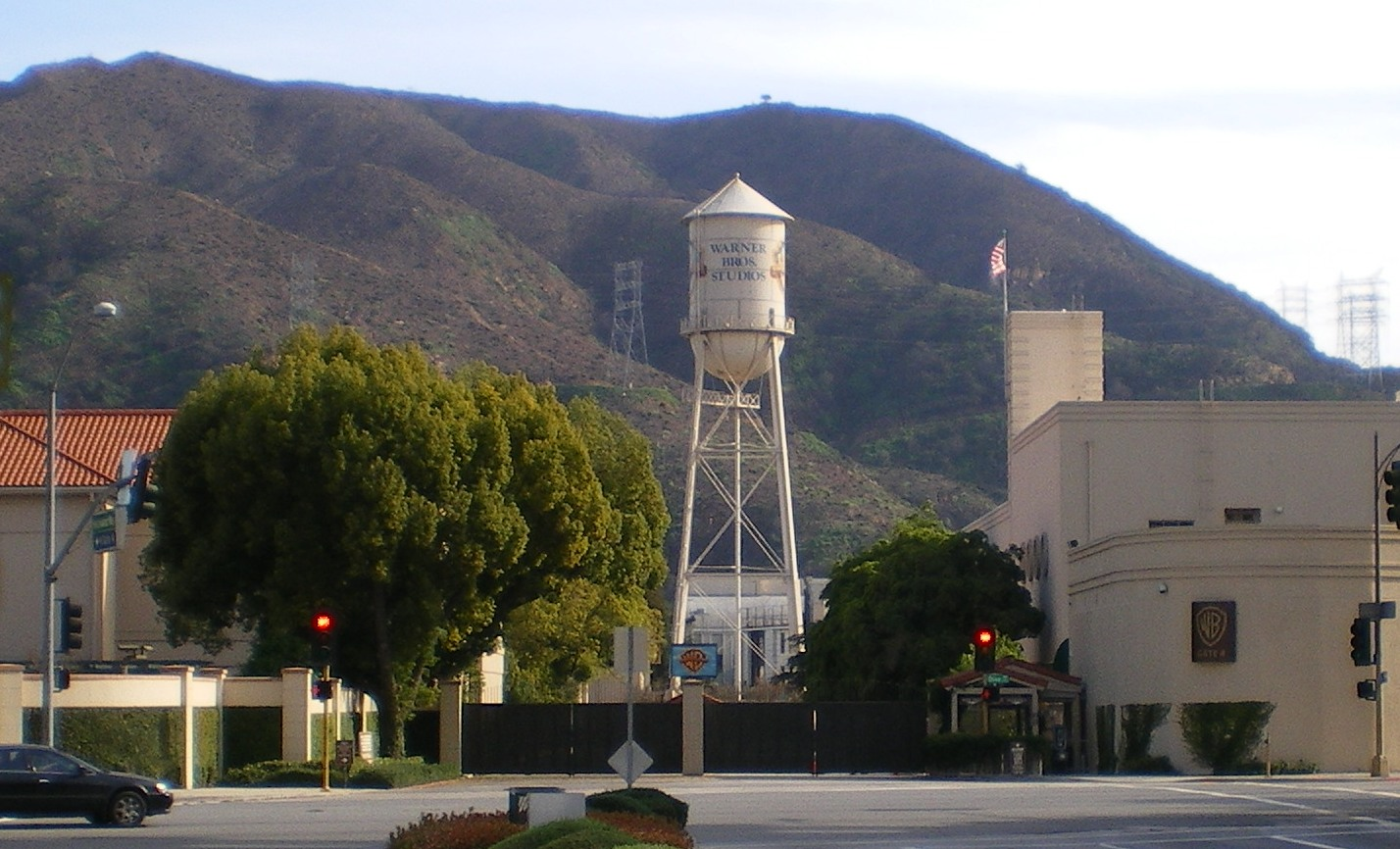
Warner Bros. Studios, Burbank

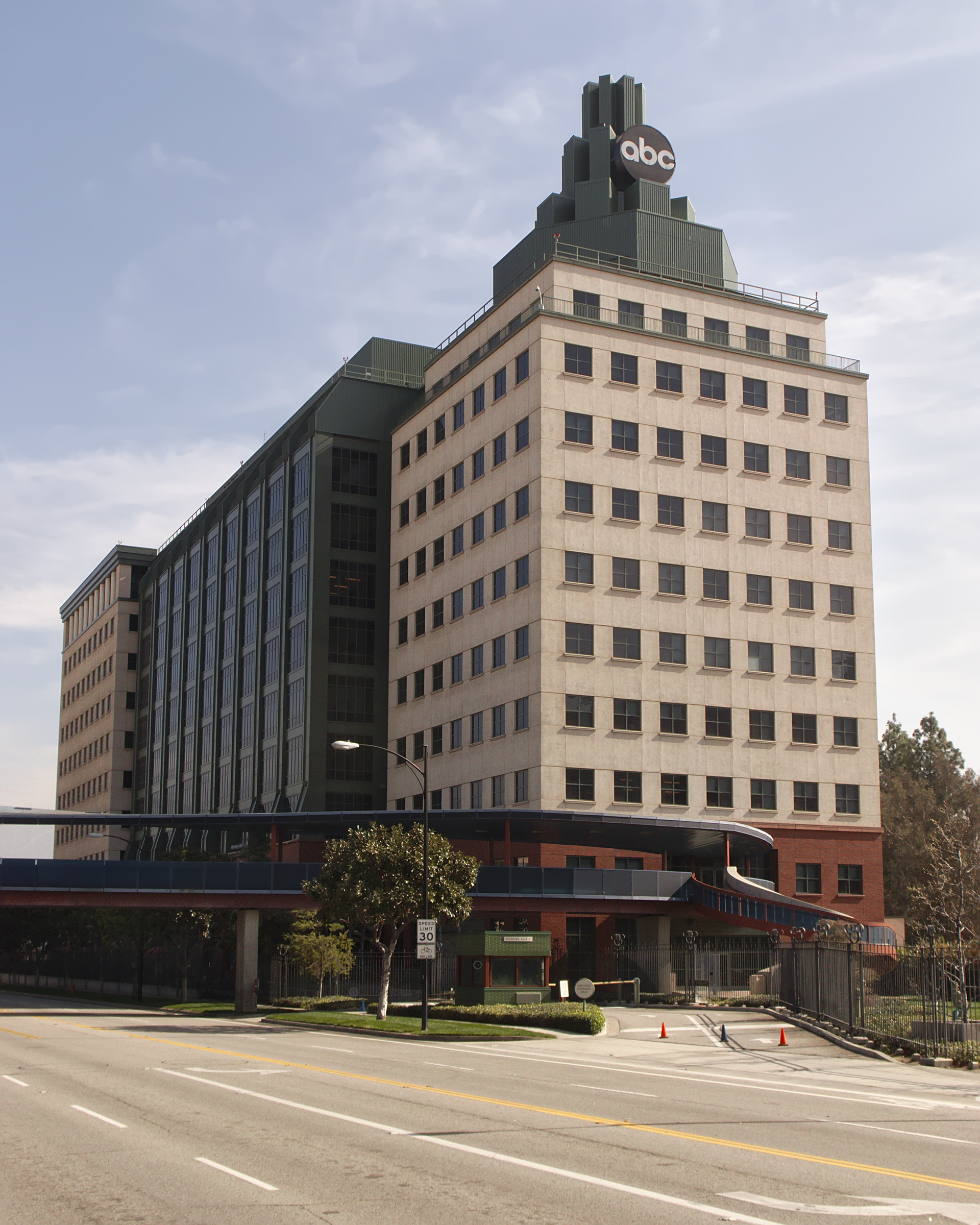
ABC Studios

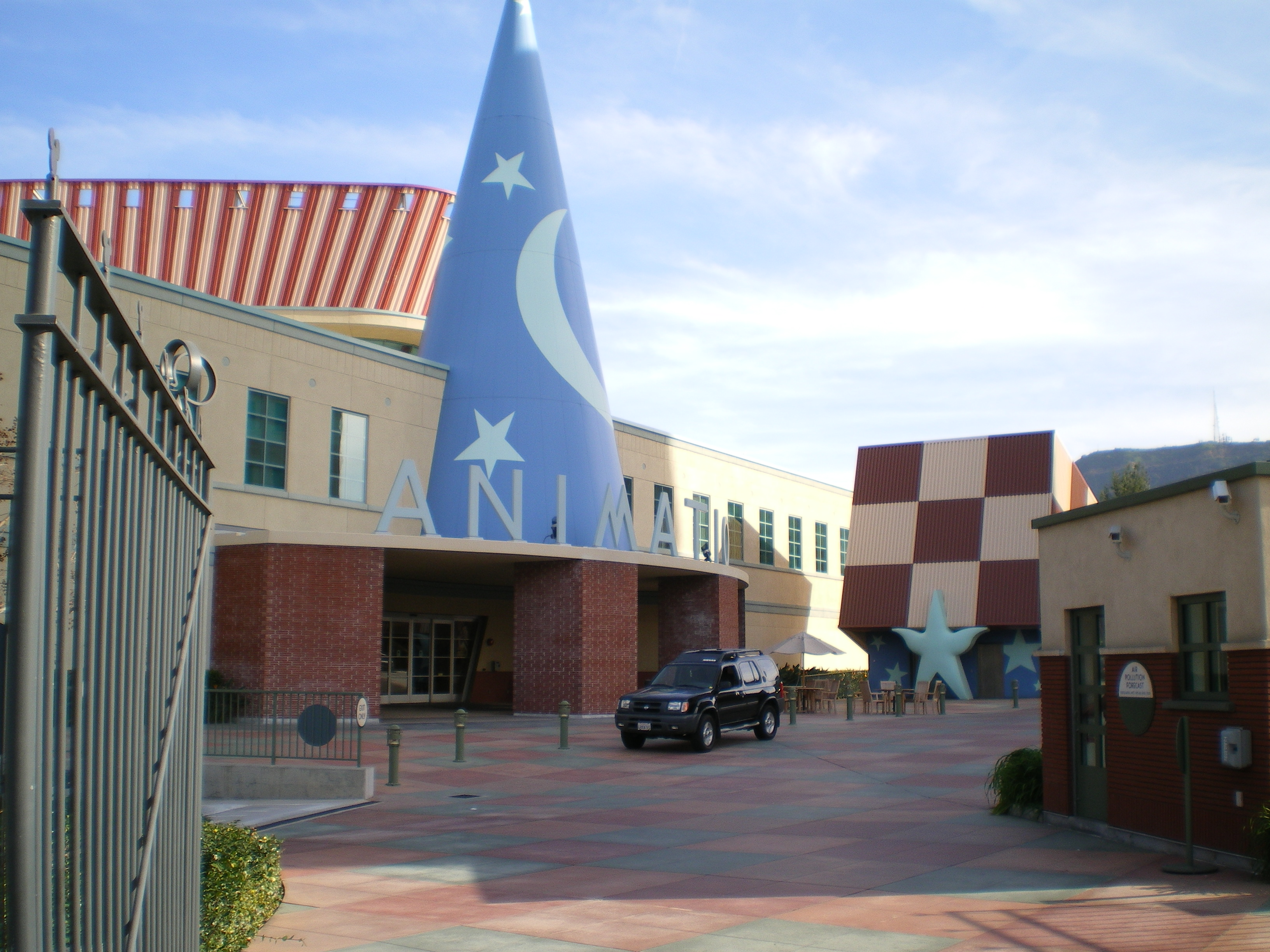
Disney Animation Building, Burbank

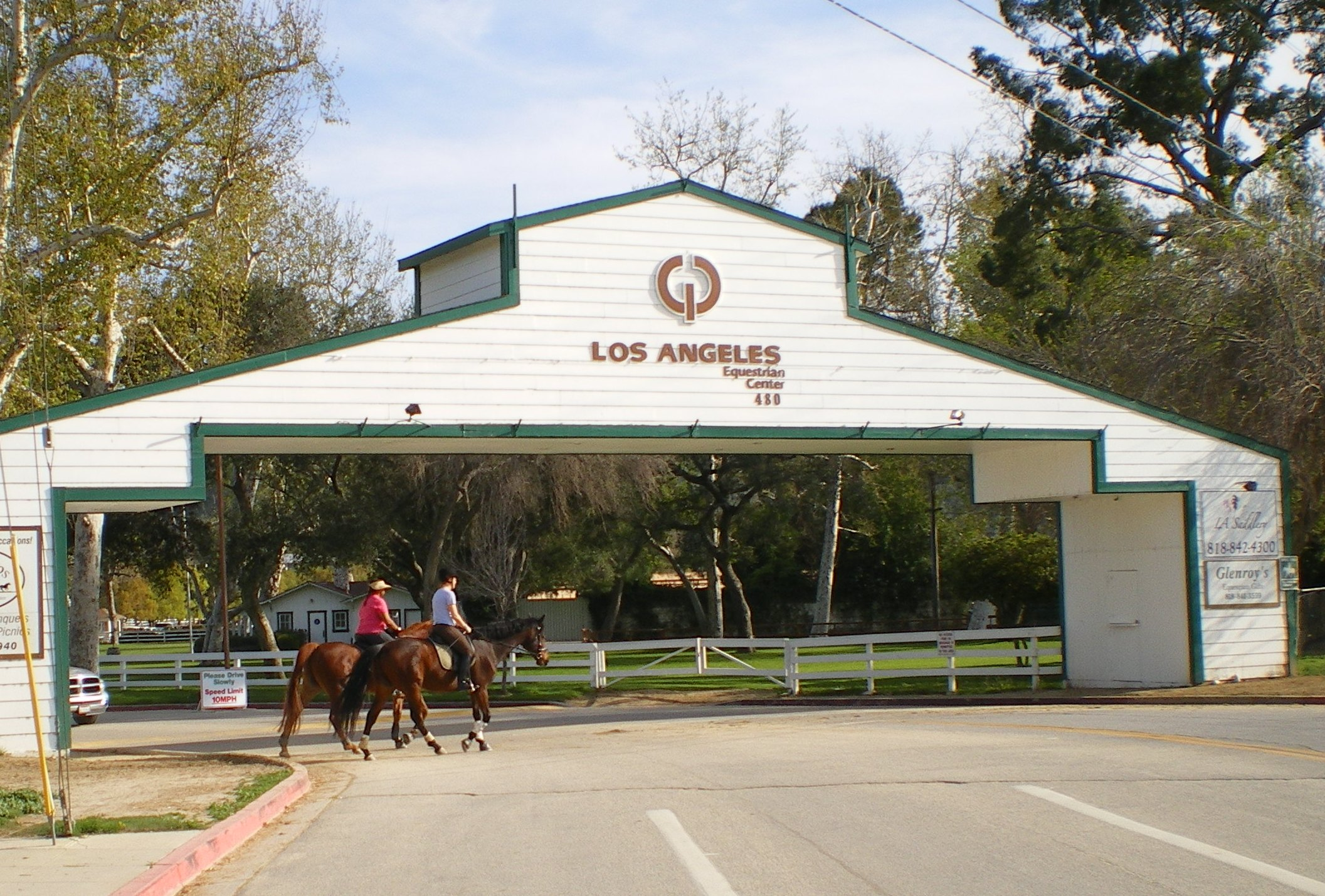
Los Angeles Equestrian Center

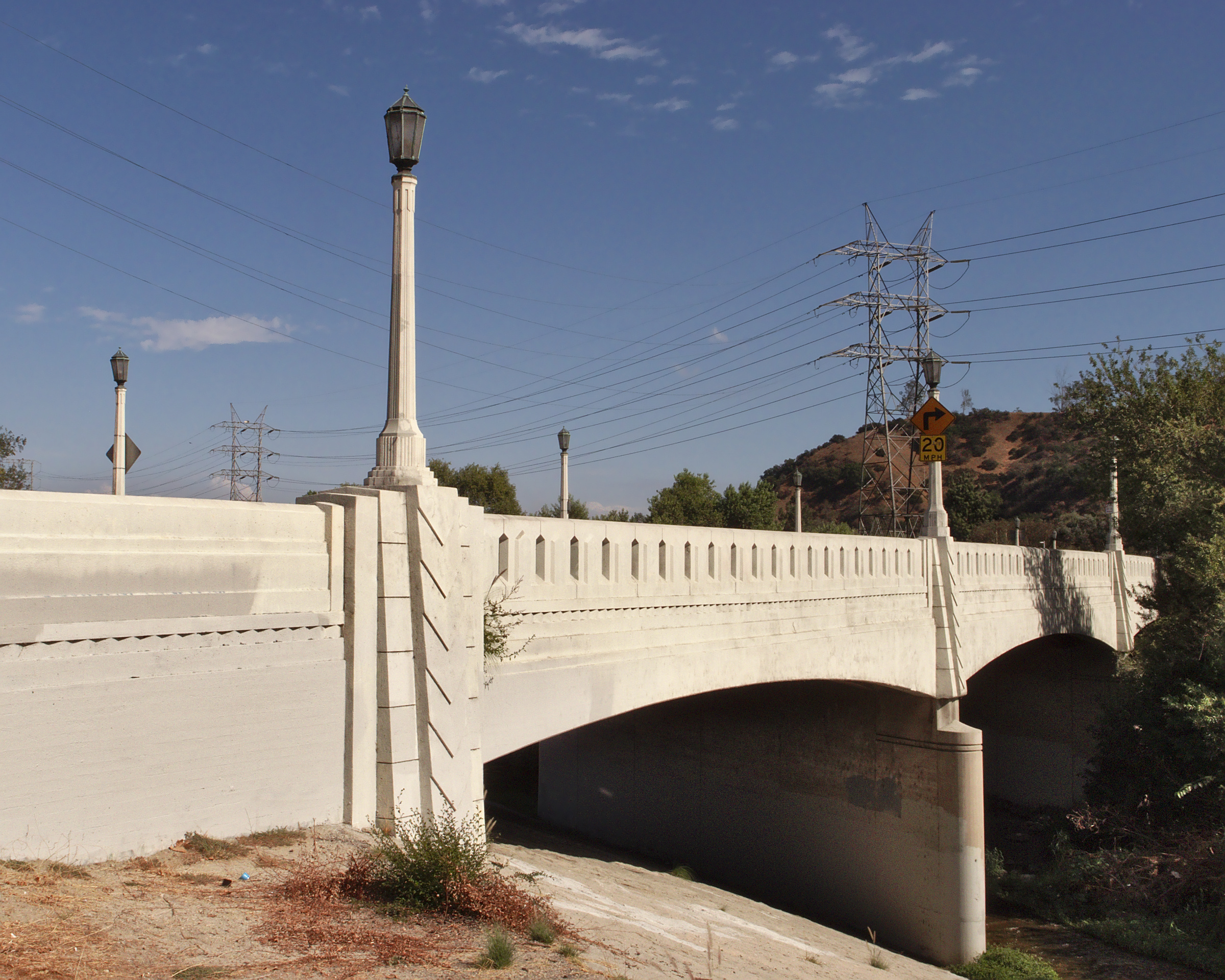
Riverside-Zoo Drive Bridge

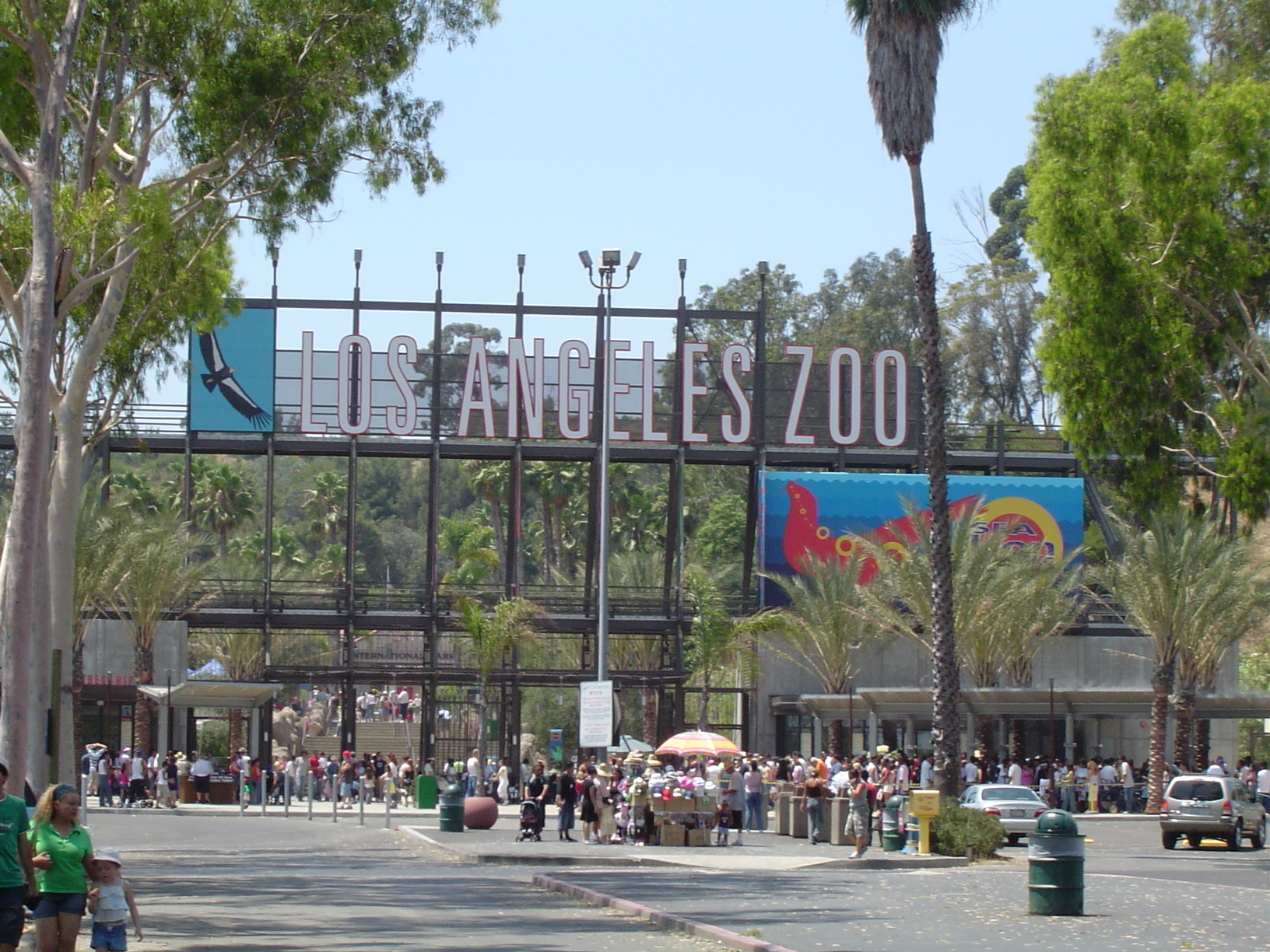
Los Angeles Zoo

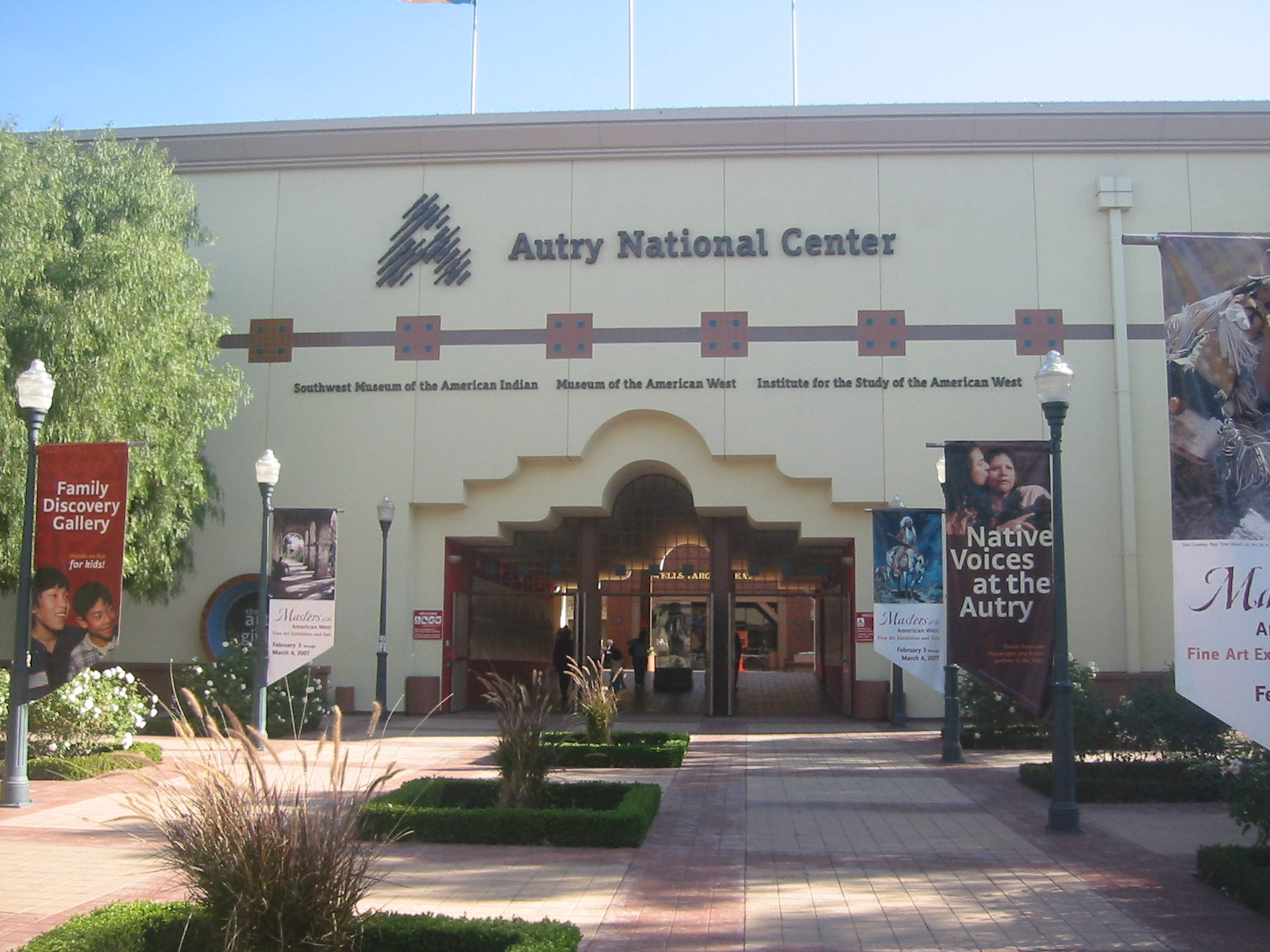
Autry National Center

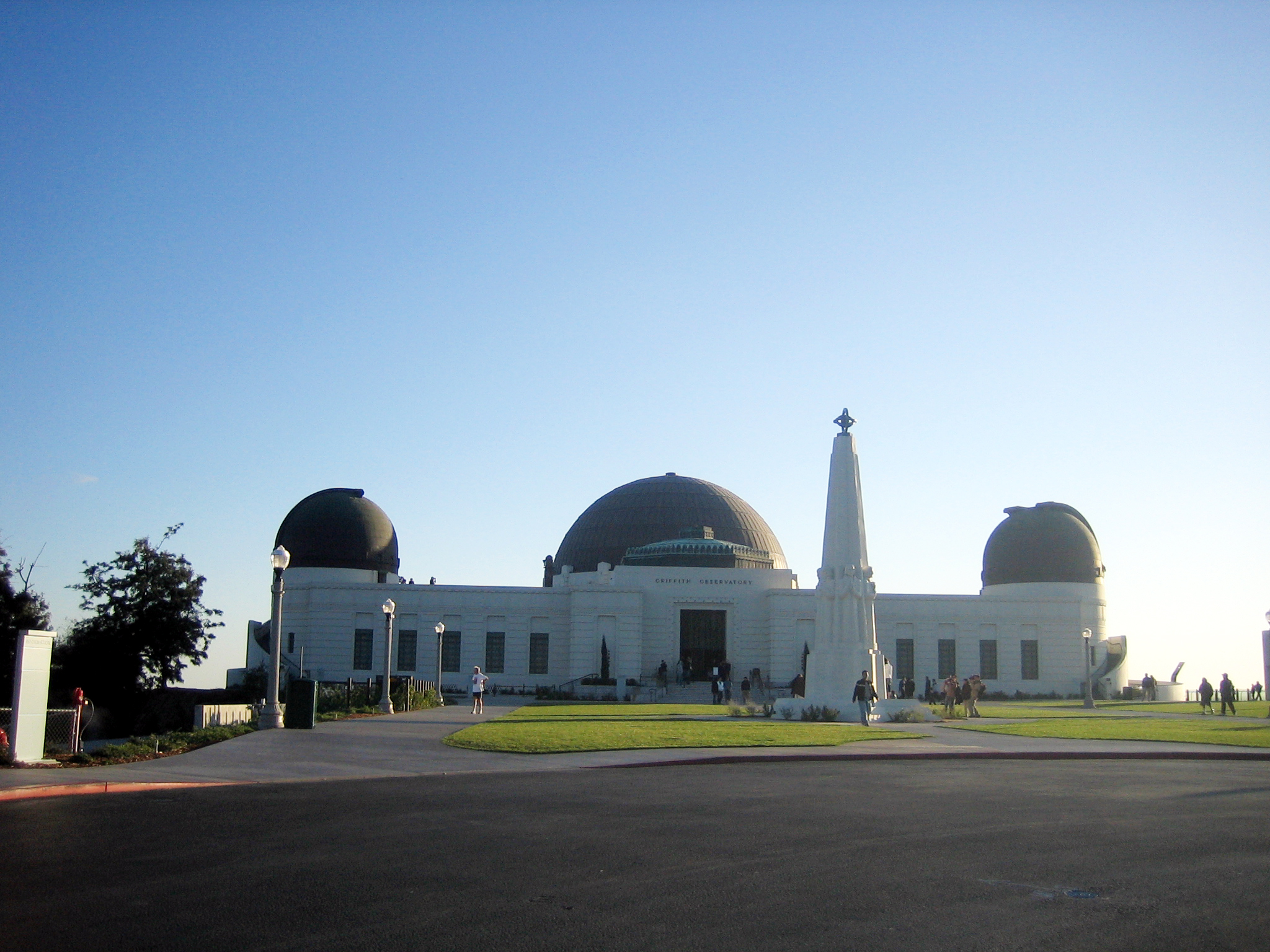
Griffith Observatory

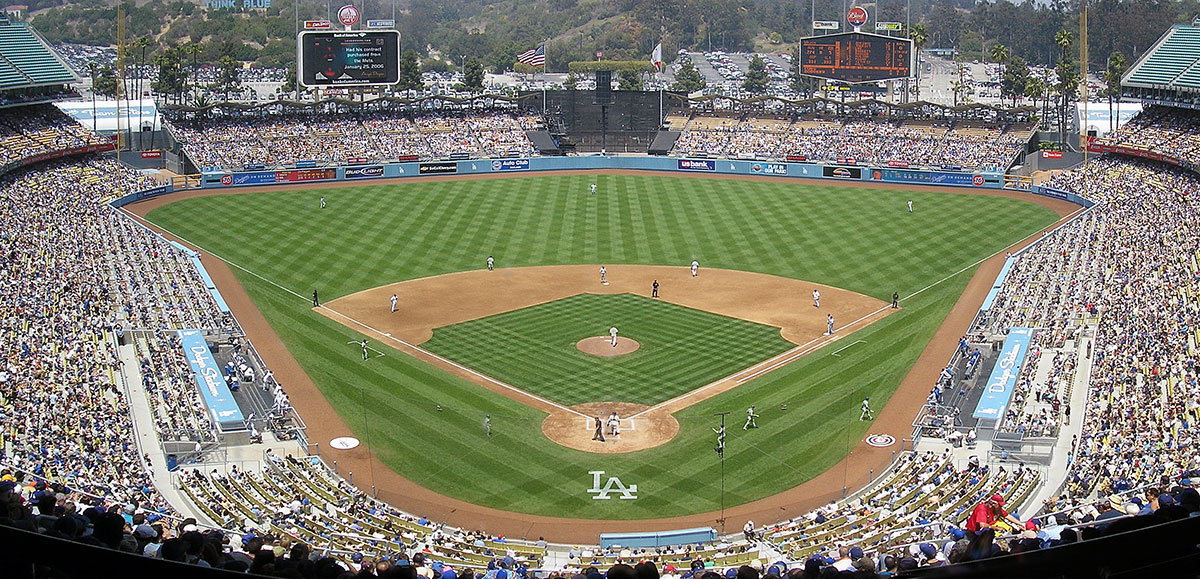
Dodger Stadium

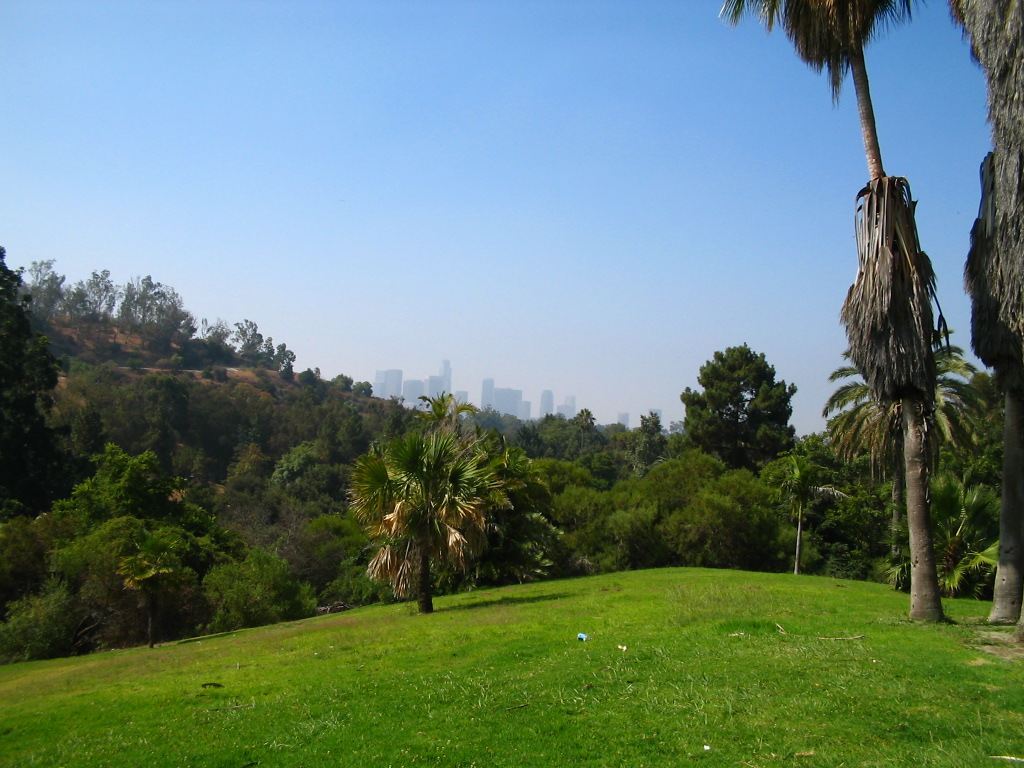
Elysian Park, looking south from Riverside Drive

== Sport ==
The drive hosted part of the 50 km walk athletic event near Griffith Park for the 1932 Summer Olympics.

== See also ==
- Harbor Boulevard, a street in Orange County that contains Disneyland.
