= Equidome =

Building in California, United States

Coordinates: 34.158525°N 118.308291°W

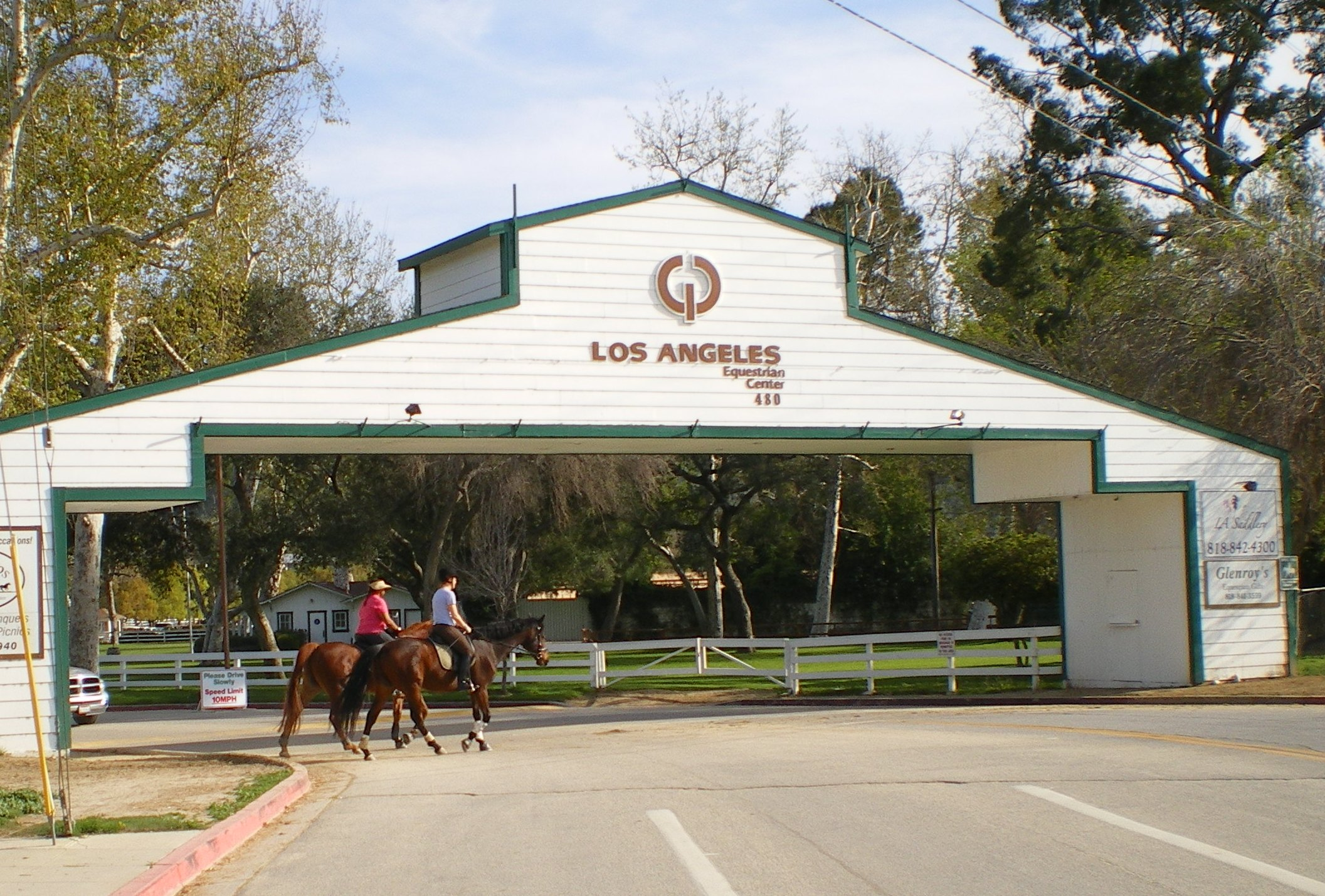
Entrance to the Los Angeles Equestrian Center complex.

The Equidome is a 3,500-seat indoor arena located at the Los Angeles Equestrian Center complex, located next to the Los Angeles River on Riverside Drive in Burbank, Los Angeles County, California.

== Overview ==
The equestrian center complex is within Griffith Park, in a separate small section across the Los Angeles River from the main park area and the Los Angeles Zoo.

The Equidome was built in 1982, and is used for sporting events such as equestrian shows, dressage competitions, and rodeos. It is occasionally used for music concerts. The arena has 45,000 square feet (4,200 m^{2}) of floor space.

=== Annual events ===
Annual events held in the Equidome include:

- "Equestfest" — held by the Pasadena Tournament of Roses at year's end to showcase the equestrian participants of the Rose Parade, prior to their parade participation on New Year's Day.
- "Fiesta of the Spanish Horse" — an equestrian show to raise awareness and funds for cancer research.
