= Ventura Freeway =

Freeway in Southern California

Ventura Freeway
- SR 134 highlighted in red; US 101 in blue

Route information
- Maintained by Caltrans
- Component highways: US 101 from the Santa Barbara/Ventura county line to North Hollywood; SR 1 from the Santa Barbara/Ventura county line to Sea Cliff, and from Solimar Beach to Oxnard; SR 134 from North Hollywood to Pasadena

Major junctions
- West end: US 101 at the Santa Barbara–Ventura county line
- SR 33 in Ventura; SR 126 in Ventura; SR 1 in Oxnard; SR 23 in Thousand Oaks; SR 27 in Woodland Hills; I-405 in Sherman Oaks; US 101 / SR 134 / SR 170 in North Hollywood; I-5 in Los Angeles; SR 2 at the Los Angeles–Glendale line
- East end: I-210 in Pasadena

Location
- Country: United States
- State: California
- Counties: Ventura, Los Angeles

Highway system
- State highways in California; Interstate; US; State; Scenic; History; Pre‑1964; Unconstructed; Deleted; Freeways
- Southern California freeways
← SR 133	→ SR 135

The Ventura Freeway is one of the principal freeways in Southern California, United States, connecting Ventura County and the southern San Fernando Valley in Los Angeles County. While it runs through an east–west corridor from the Santa Barbara–Ventura county line to the City of Pasadena, most of it is signed as part of the north-south U.S. Route 101. The Ventura Freeway's eastern segment from its intersection with the Hollywood Freeway in the southeastern San Fernando Valley (the Hollywood Split) to its terminus at the Foothill Freeway (Interstate 210) in Pasadena is signed as State Route 134 (SR 134). In addition, the segments from the Santa Barbara County line to Sea Cliff, and from Solimar Beach to Oxnard, are concurrent with State Route 1 (SR 1), although no signs mention SR 1 there.

The US 101 segment was built in the late 1950s and opened on April 5, 1960. The SR 134 segment was built by 1971. Before the construction of the new alignment in 1971, most of the portion was known as the Colorado Freeway after nearby Colorado Boulevard, a historic thoroughfare in Pasadena and northeastern Los Angeles.

== Route description ==
The Ventura Freeway runs from the Santa Barbara–Ventura county line, west of La Conchita, to the Foothill Freeway in Pasadena. From its terminus at the Santa Barbara county line to its intersection with the Hollywood Freeway in the southeastern San Fernando Valley (also known as the Hollywood Split), the freeway is signed as part of U.S. Route 101 (US 101). Afterwards, it is signed as State Route 134 (SR 134) until its eastern terminus at the Foothill Freeway (Interstate 210). The portion of the Ventura Freeway designated as US 101 is signed as a north–south route by the California Department of Transportation (Caltrans) despite the freeway's actual alignment being east–west. This is due to the fact that US 101 as a whole has an overall north–south alignment. The apparent inconsistency can be confusing to visitors, as the same freeway entrance can often be signed as "101 North" and "101 West." This is most common in the San Fernando Valley. Conversely, the SR 134 segment is properly signed as an east-west highway.

From the Santa Barbara county line, US 101 travels eastward through the citrus orchards and strawberry fields of Ventura County's Oxnard Plain before ascending the short, steep Conejo Grade into the Conejo Valley. Continuing eastward through the northern Santa Monica Mountains, it crosses the Ventura/Los Angeles county line before entering the San Fernando Valley. The freeway continues eastward along the valley's southern rim, crossing the San Diego Freeway (Interstate 405) near Sherman Oaks at an interchange consistently rated as one of the five most congested in the nation.

=== State Route 134 ===
As of the latest amendment in 1963, the California Streets and Highways Code defines Route 134 in section 434, and that the highway is "from Route 101 near Riverside Drive easterly to Route 210 via the vicinity of Glendale".

SR 134 begins its eastbound route at the junction with the Hollywood Freeway (known as the Hollywood Split), continuing the freeway northwards. US 101 leaves the freeway, merging onto the Hollywood Freeway and heads south. SR 170 continues the Hollywood Freeway, heading north. For motorists entering the interchange, the freeways' acute intersecting angles limits their ability to exit in certain directions of travel due to missing ramps. For those intending to go from SR 134 west to US 101 south must instead use the Lankershim Boulevard exit and follow the signs near Universal Studios to re-enter on US 101. Likewise, motorists going from US 101 north to SR 134 east must use the Vineland Avenue exit and follow the signs to the US 101 on-ramp on Riverside Drive

SR 134 then continues east, skirting the northern edge of Griffith Park before intersecting the Golden State Freeway (I-5) and crossing the Los Angeles River. After passing through Downtown Glendale south of the Verdugo Mountains, it continues along the southern slope of the San Rafael Hills between Glendale and Eagle Rock before entering Pasadena near the Arroyo Seco and terminating at the Foothill Freeway (I-210).

SR 134 is the main connector from the San Fernando Valley and points north to the San Gabriel Valley and points east. The unsigned SR 710 travels south of the I-210/SR 134 interchange to its terminus at California Boulevard. Residents of South Pasadena have blocked efforts to extend SR 710 south from California Boulevard down to Valley Boulevard north of I-10 (northern terminus of I-710) near the Alhambra/Los Angeles city limit. Signs on SR 134 and I-210 refer to the SR 710 stub in Pasadena as "To SR 110", because exiting left from the SR 710 stub onto California Boulevard and turning right on Arroyo Parkway leads directly to SR 110, which is Pasadena's only direct freeway link to Downtown Los Angeles.

=== Legal definitions ===
The official Ventura Freeway designation is Routes 101 and 134 from Route 5 to the Santa Barbara County line. This does not include the portion of Route 134 between Route 5 and Route 210 even though local usage extends the name over this portion of freeway. At the freeway's eastern terminus with Interstate 210 in Pasadena, highway signs indicate "Ventura" as the destination direction for Route 134.

Assembly Concurrent Resolution 54, Chapter 85 in 2003 also designated Route 101 in Ventura County as the "Screaming Eagles Highway". This honors the 101st Airborne Division of the United States Army, which formed on July 23, 1918 and has been involved in every major war that the United States has participated in since then.

The interchange of SR 134 and I-5 is officially the "Gene Autry Memorial Interchange", after the singing cowboy superstar Gene Autry. Autry's Museum of the American West is located near the interchange in Griffith Park.

The California Legislature passed a resolution in 2017 to designate the easternmost segment of the SR 134 freeway between SR 2 and its terminus at I-210 as the "President Barack H. Obama Highway", in honor of the 44th U.S. President Barack Obama, who had attended Occidental College in Eagle Rock from 1979 to 1981. Signs were posted on December 20, 2018.

Both the SR 134 and US 101 portions of the freeway are part of the California Freeway and Expressway System, and is part of the National Highway System, a network of highways that are considered essential to the country's economy, defense, and mobility by the Federal Highway Administration.

=== Gallery ===
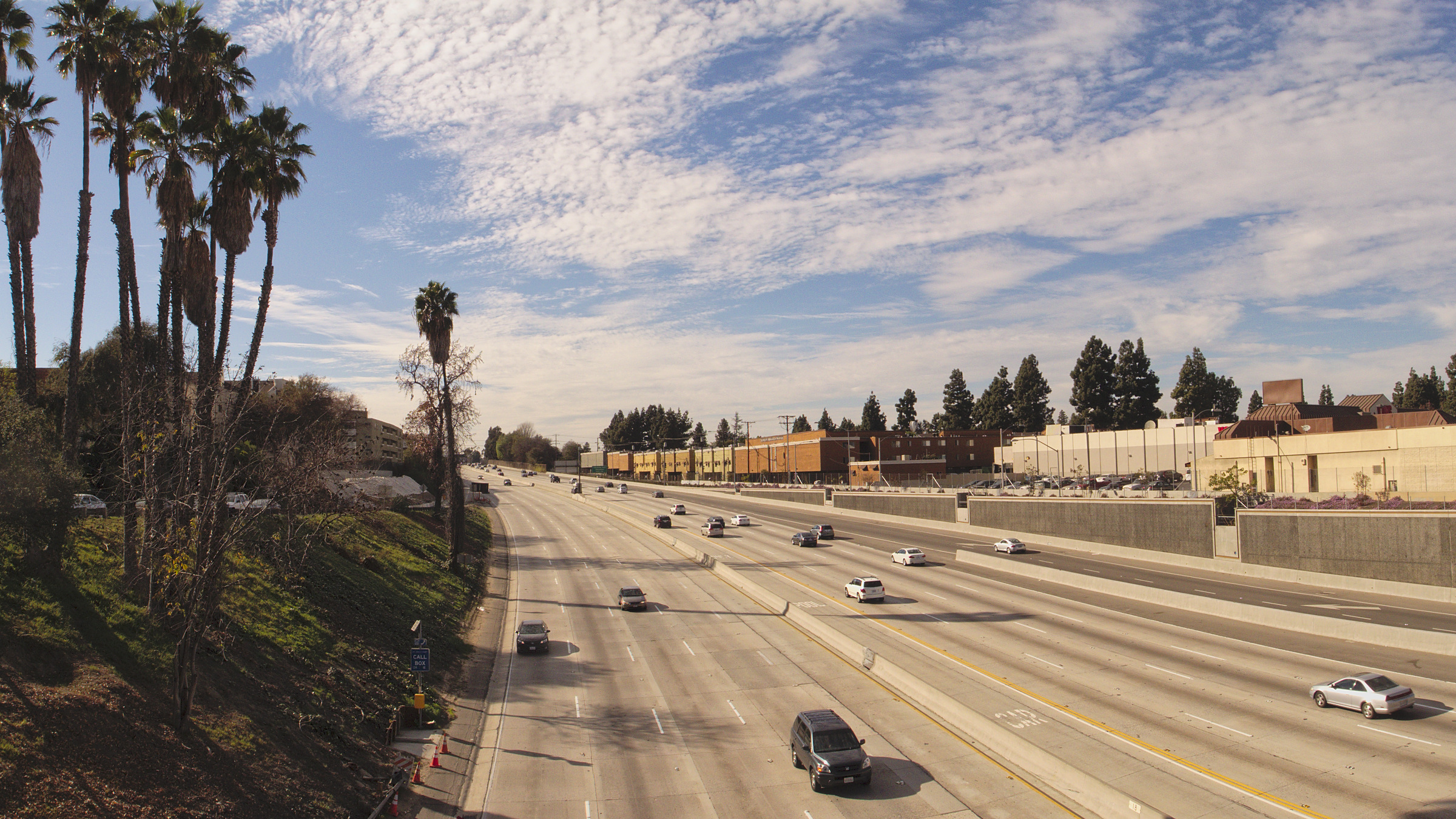
The SR 134 portion of the Ventura Freeway at the western edge of Burbank, California looking west from N Pass Ave.

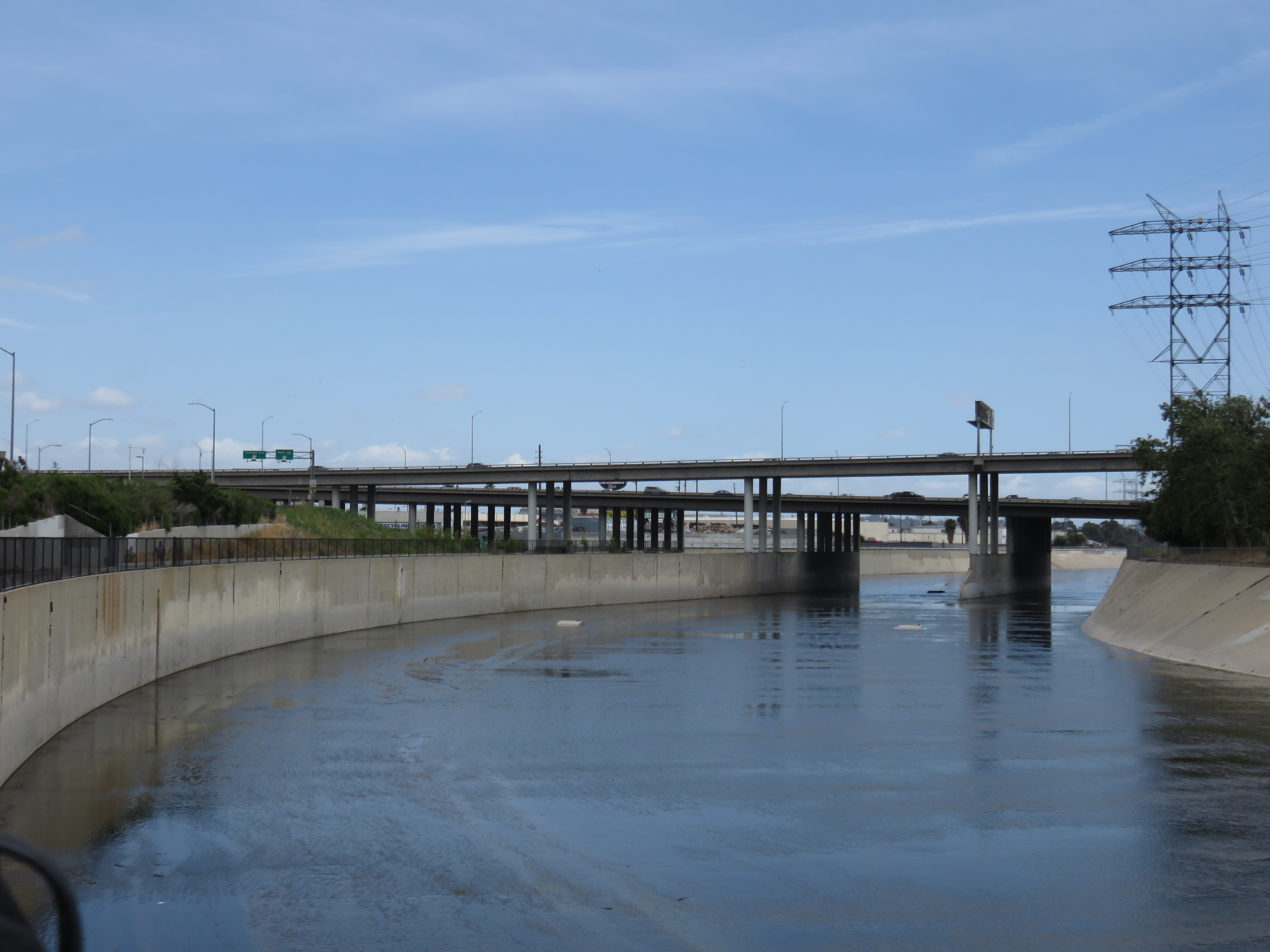
The Ventura Freeway crosses the Los Angeles River at its confluence with Verdugo Wash

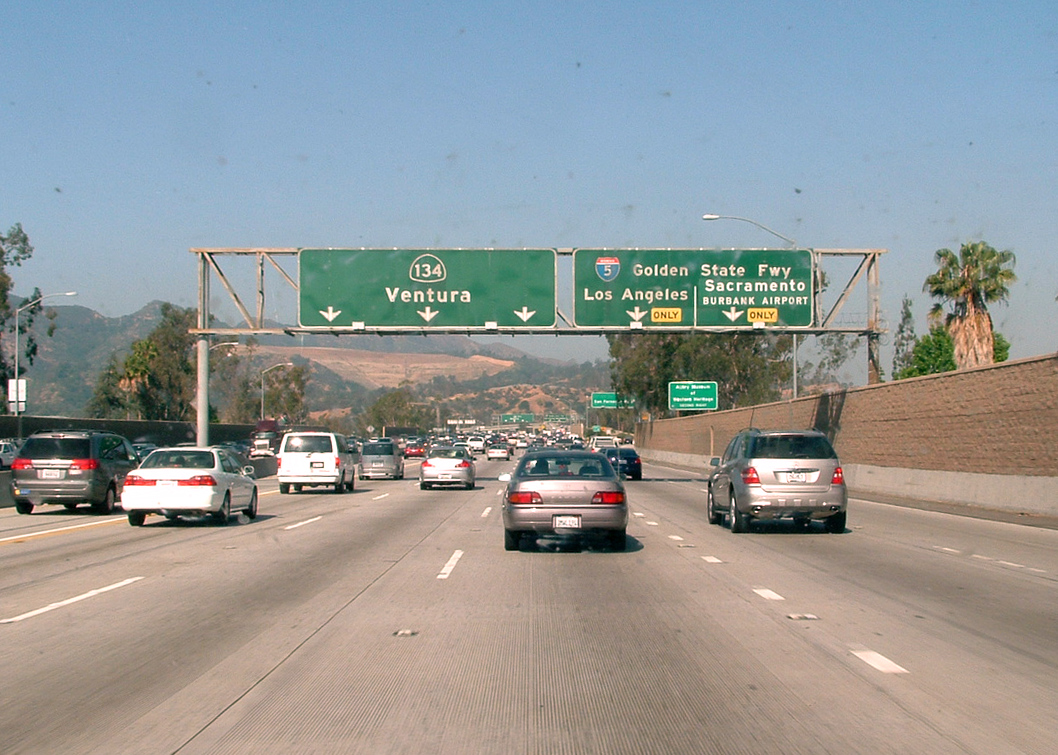
Westbound SR 134 in Glendale approaching I-5

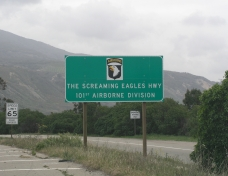
Sign marking the "Screaming Eagles Highway"

== History ==
On November 20, 1952, the California State Highway Commission announced the planned route of the Ventura Freeway through the San Fernando Valley, extending from Sepulveda Boulevard eastward to the Los Angeles city limits. Construction began in September 1956.

A pre-freeway alignment of State Route 134 originated at U.S. Route 101 (Ventura Boulevard) and Fulton Avenue in Los Angeles, then along Fulton, Moorpark Street, Riverside Drive and Alameda Avenue before meeting up with U.S. 6/99 (San Fernando Road) in Burbank. It traveled along San Fernando Road to Colorado Street, then ran along Colorado Street (portions of which have been renamed Eagle Vista Drive) through Glendale, Eagle Rock and Pasadena before terminating at U.S. Route 66. The alignment was later cut back to terminate in Studio City at Lankershim and Ventura.

The Interstate 5 off-ramp at Colorado Street is actually a former routing of SR 134, and there are still mileposts that refer to it as such. Old SR 134 followed Colorado Street through Glendale and Colorado Boulevard in Eagle Rock to the ramp connecting Colorado Boulevard and Figueroa Street to the Ventura Freeway. Old SR 134 continued onto the ramp and then onto what is presently the Ventura Freeway to Orange Grove Boulevard in Pasadena. The Colorado Boulevard/Figueroa Street ramps plus the segment of freeway between the ramps and just east of Orange Grove Boulevard were previously known as the Colorado Freeway.

From 1964 to 1992, the Colorado Boulevard portions of Route 134 were renumbered as California State Route 248.

== Projects ==
The Wallis Annenberg Wildlife Crossing, currently under construction, is a vegetated overpass spanning the Ventura Freeway and Agoura Road at Liberty Canyon in Agoura Hills. When built, it will be one of the largest urban wildlife crossing in the United States, connecting the Simi Hills and the Santa Monica Mountains over a busy freeway with ten traffic lanes (including exit lanes).

Ventura Freeway currently carries the Los Angeles Metro express bus route 501 between Pasadena and North Hollywood. Portions of SR 134 are also being considered as part of a Bus Rapid Transit project.

== Exit list ==
This exit list proceeds from east to west, since the majority of the freeway is the north-south US 101. Except where prefixed with a letter, postmiles were measured on the road as it was in 1964, based on the alignment that existed at the time, and do not necessarily reflect current mileage. Postmile prefixes include: R reflecting a realignment in the route since then, M indicating a second realignment, L referring to an overlap due to a correction or change, and T indicating postmiles classified as temporary. Segments that remain unconstructed or have been relinquished to local control may be omitted. The numbers reset at county lines; the start and end postmiles in each county are given in the county column.

County	Location	Postmile	Exit	Destinations	Notes
Los Angeles; LA R13.34-0.00; 11.75-38.19	Pasadena	R13.34	—	I-210 east (Foothill Freeway) – San Bernardino	Eastern terminus of SR 134 and Ventura Freeway; I-210 west exit 26A
Los Angeles; LA R13.34-0.00; 11.75-38.19	Pasadena	R13.34	25C (Note: Exit number follows I-210 rather than SR 134.)	Fair Oaks Avenue, Marengo Avenue	Westbound exit is part of exits 25A–B on I-210 west
Los Angeles; LA R13.34-0.00; 11.75-38.19	Pasadena	R13.34	13B	I-210 west (Foothill Freeway) to SR 110 / Del Mar Boulevard / California Boulevard (SR 710) – San Fernando	I-210 east exits 25B
Los Angeles; LA R13.34-0.00; 11.75-38.19	Pasadena	R12.97	13A	Colorado Boulevard, Orange Grove Boulevard	Former SR 248
Los Angeles; LA R13.34-0.00; 11.75-38.19	Pasadena	R12.36	12	San Rafael Avenue, Linda Vista Avenue	Linda Vista Avenue was former SR 159 north
Los Angeles; LA R13.34-0.00; 11.75-38.19	Los Angeles	R11.44	11	Figueroa Street, Colorado Boulevard	Figueroa Street was former US 66 Alt. west / SR 159 south; Colorado Boulevard was former US 66 Alt. east / SR 248 east; westbound exit and eastbound entrance for Colorado Boulevard only connected via 0.7 mile flyover ramps, formerly part of SR 134 west
Los Angeles; LA R13.34-0.00; 11.75-38.19	Los Angeles–Glendale line	R8.96	9B	SR 2 (Glendale Freeway)	Signed as exit 9A eastbound; SR 2 north exits 17A-B, south exit 17B
Los Angeles; LA R13.34-0.00; 11.75-38.19	Glendale	R8.81	9A	Harvey Drive	Signed as exit 9B eastbound
Los Angeles; LA R13.34-0.00; 11.75-38.19	Glendale	R7.87	8	Glendale Avenue	
Los Angeles; LA R13.34-0.00; 11.75-38.19	Glendale	R6.96– R7.13	7B	Central Avenue, Brand Boulevard	
Los Angeles; LA R13.34-0.00; 11.75-38.19	Glendale	R6.57	7A	Pacific Avenue	
Los Angeles; LA R13.34-0.00; 11.75-38.19	Glendale	R6.18	6	San Fernando Road	Former US 6 / US 99
Los Angeles; LA R13.34-0.00; 11.75-38.19	Los Angeles	R5.47	5	I-5 north (Golden State Freeway) – Sacramento, Burbank Airport	Westbound exit and eastbound entrance; I-5 south exit 144; eastbound access is via exit 5A
Los Angeles; LA R13.34-0.00; 11.75-38.19	Los Angeles	R5.47	5B	I-5 south (Golden State Freeway) – Los Angeles	Westbound exit is part of exit 5; I-5 north exit 144A-B
Los Angeles; LA R13.34-0.00; 11.75-38.19	Los Angeles	4.81	5A	Victory Boulevard to I-5 north	Eastbound exit and westbound entrance
Los Angeles; LA R13.34-0.00; 11.75-38.19	Los Angeles	3.81	4	Forest Lawn Drive	
Los Angeles; LA R13.34-0.00; 11.75-38.19	Burbank	2.90	3	Bob Hope Drive, Buena Vista Street	
Los Angeles; LA R13.34-0.00; 11.75-38.19	Burbank	2.11	2	Hollywood Way	No eastbound exit
Los Angeles; LA R13.34-0.00; 11.75-38.19	Burbank	1.82	2	Pass Avenue – Burbank	Eastbound exit only
Los Angeles; LA R13.34-0.00; 11.75-38.19	Los Angeles	0.86	1D	Cahuenga Boulevard – Hollywood	Signed as exit 1 eastbound; no westbound entrance
Los Angeles; LA R13.34-0.00; 11.75-38.19	Los Angeles	0.51	1C	Lankershim Boulevard to US 101 south – North Hollywood	Westbound exit and eastbound entrance
Los Angeles; LA R13.34-0.00; 11.75-38.19	Los Angeles	0.35		Vineland Avenue	Eastbound exit and entrance only
Los Angeles; LA R13.34-0.00; 11.75-38.19	Los Angeles	0.00	1B	SR 170 north (Hollywood Freeway) – Sacramento	West/northbound exit and east/southbound entrance; signed as exit 13 on US 101 north; SR 170 south exit 5B; east/south end of Hollywood Split
Los Angeles; LA R13.34-0.00; 11.75-38.19	Los Angeles	0.00 11.75 (Note: Indicates that the postmile represents the distance along US 101 rather than SR 134.)	—	West end of SR 134; East/south end of US 101 overlap	Ventura Freeway west follows SR 134 exit 1A to US 101 north; SR 170 south exit 5B
Los Angeles; LA R13.34-0.00; 11.75-38.19	Los Angeles	0.00 11.75	—	US 101 south (Hollywood Freeway) – Los Angeles	East/southbound exit and west/northbound entrance; SR 134 east follows US 101 south exit 13B; west/north end of Hollywood Split
see US 101 (exits 13A–83)
Ventura–Santa Barbara county line		R43.62	—	US 101 north (SR 1) – Santa Barbara, San Francisco	Western terminus of Ventura Freeway; continuation into Santa Barbara County
1.000 mi = 1.609 km; 1.000 km = 0.621 mi: Concurrency terminus; Incomplete access; Route transition

== See also ==
- Colorado Street
