= Laurel Canyon Boulevard =

Major street in Los Angeles, California

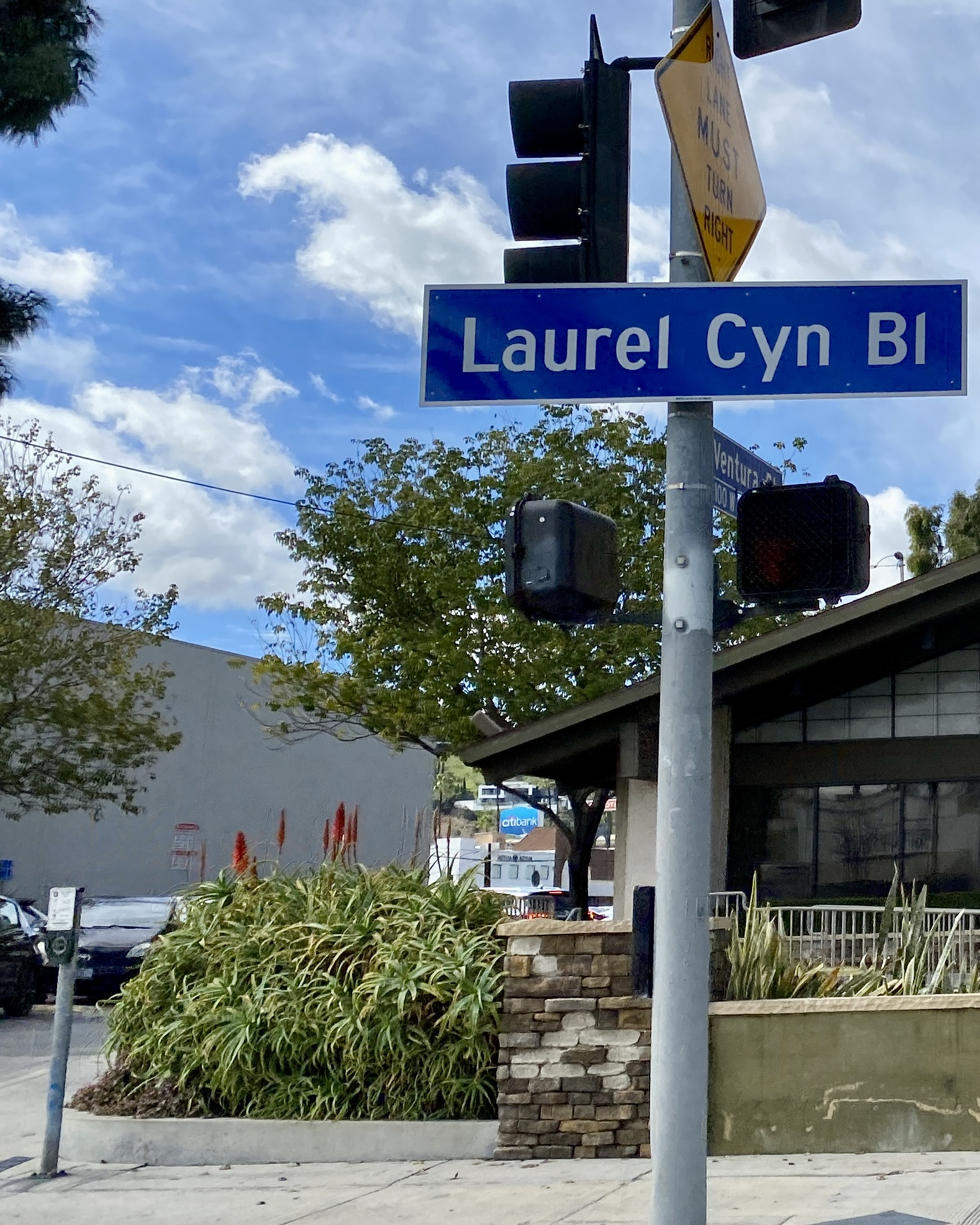
Laurel Cyn Bl (2024)

Laurel Canyon Boulevard is a major street in the city of Los Angeles. It starts off at Polk Street in Sylmar in the northern San Fernando Valley near the junction of the San Diego (Interstate 405) and the Golden State (I-5)) freeways. Laurel Canyon Boulevard bypasses the city of San Fernando to the west, running parallel to I-5 in the vicinity of Pacoima and Arleta. The portion through Sun Valley passes through rock quarries and a great deal of open space.

== Route ==
From the intersection with Webb Avenue, Laurel Canyon Boulevard heads south, traversing North Hollywood and following the Hollywood Freeway. Laurel Canyon Boulevard passes through Valley Village, one mile (1.6 km) west of the Hollywood Split. While in Valley Village, Laurel Canyon Boulevard crosses the Laurel Canyon G Line station at its intersection with Chandler Boulevard.

South of Ventura Boulevard in Studio City, Laurel Canyon Boulevard ascends the Santa Monica Mountains, where it maintains a width of four lanes until the intersection of Mulholland Drive. The road climbs up Lookout Mountain before descending into West Hollywood, crossing Hollywood Boulevard. Laurel Canyon Boulevard’s southern terminus is at its intersection with Sunset Boulevard and Crescent Heights Boulevard.

During rush hour, both Laurel Canyon Boulevard and Coldwater Canyon Avenue to the west are popular alternate routes to the Hollywood Freeway.

== History ==
=== Laurel Canyon freeway ===
The Laurel Canyon Freeway was to have been a north-south freeway in Central Los Angeles. It derived its name from Laurel Canyon, the proposed route by which the freeway would traverse the Santa Monica Mountains.

The freeway would have traversed between the Hollywood Split in the San Fernando Valley and Interstate 405 near Los Angeles International Airport in west Los Angeles, traversing Laurel Canyon and crossing central Los Angeles and Interstate 10 to do so. The proposed route was along the current routing of Laurel Canyon Boulevard, but local opposition from the Laurel Canyon neighborhood doomed the project. The only portion of the freeway built was a small section of La Cienega Boulevard through the Baldwin Hills district of southwestern Los Angeles.

== Culture ==
Laurel Canyon itself found counterculture fame in the 1960s as home to many of L.A.'s top rock musicians, such as Frank Zappa. The bohemian spirit endures; every year, residents gather for a group photograph at the country market. Laurel Canyon Boulevard was also immortalized by The Doors in their 1968 song "Love Street."

== Sites ==
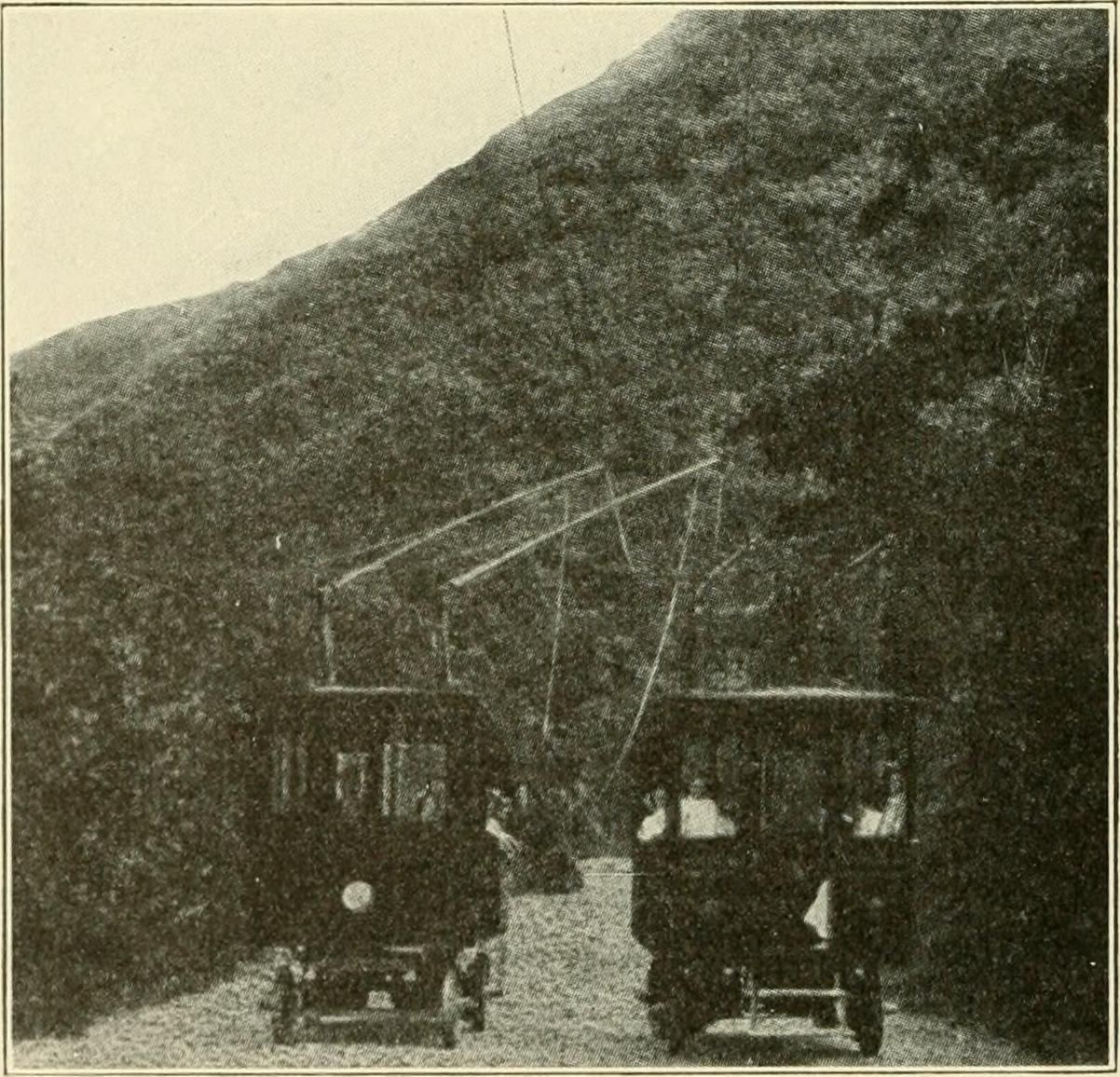
Trolley buses passing each other on Laurel Canyon Drive. The bus on the right is coasting downhill with its trolley poles down, 1910s.

In 1919 Harry Houdini rented the cottage (Note: "Not the home, which was sensationally dubbed "the Houdini mansion" when it burned in 1959. It should not be confused with houses of Houdini.) at 2435 Laurel Canyon Boulevard, while making movies for Lasky Pictures. His wife occupied it for a time after his death. As of 2011 that site was a vacant lot. The main mansion building itself was rebuilt after it was destroyed in the 1959 Laurel Canyon fire, and is now a historic venue. While Houdini did not likely live at the "mansion," there is some probability that his widow did.
