= Hollywood Freeway =

Freeway in California

Hollywood Freeway
- SR 170 highlighted in red; US 101 in blue

Route information
- Maintained by Caltrans
- Length: 16.6 mi (26.7 km)
- Component highways: US 101 from Downtown Los Angeles to North Hollywood; SR 170 from North Hollywood to Sun Valley

Major junctions
- South end: US 101 / SR 110 in Downtown Los Angeles
- US 101 / SR 134 / SR 170 in North Hollywood
- North end: I-5 in Sun Valley

Location
- Country: United States
- State: California
- County: Los Angeles

Highway system
- State highways in California; Interstate; US; State; Scenic; History; Pre‑1964; Unconstructed; Deleted; Freeways
- Southern California freeways
← SR 169	→ SR 171

The Hollywood Freeway is one of the principal freeways of Los Angeles, California (the boundaries of which it does not leave) and one of the busiest in the United States. It is the principal route through the Cahuenga Pass, the primary shortcut between the Los Angeles Basin and the San Fernando Valley. It is considered one of the most important freeways in the history of Los Angeles and instrumental in the development of the San Fernando Valley. It is the second oldest freeway in Los Angeles (after the Arroyo Seco Parkway). From its southern end at the Four Level Interchange to its intersection with the Ventura Freeway in the southeastern San Fernando Valley (the Hollywood Split), it is signed as part of U.S. Route 101. It is then signed as State Route 170 (SR 170) north to its terminus at the Golden State Freeway (Interstate 5).

== Route description ==
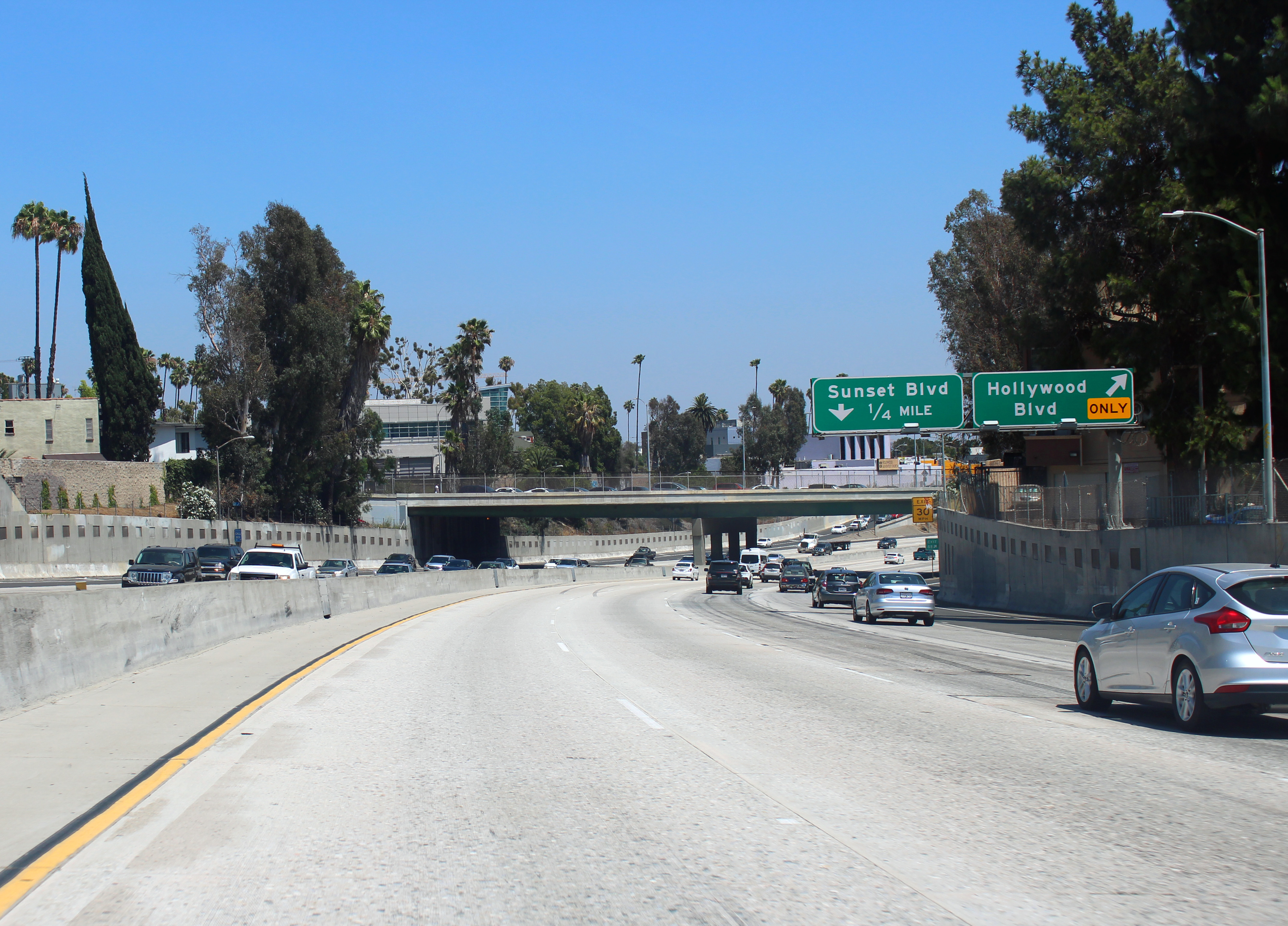
Southbound approaching Hollywood Boulevard

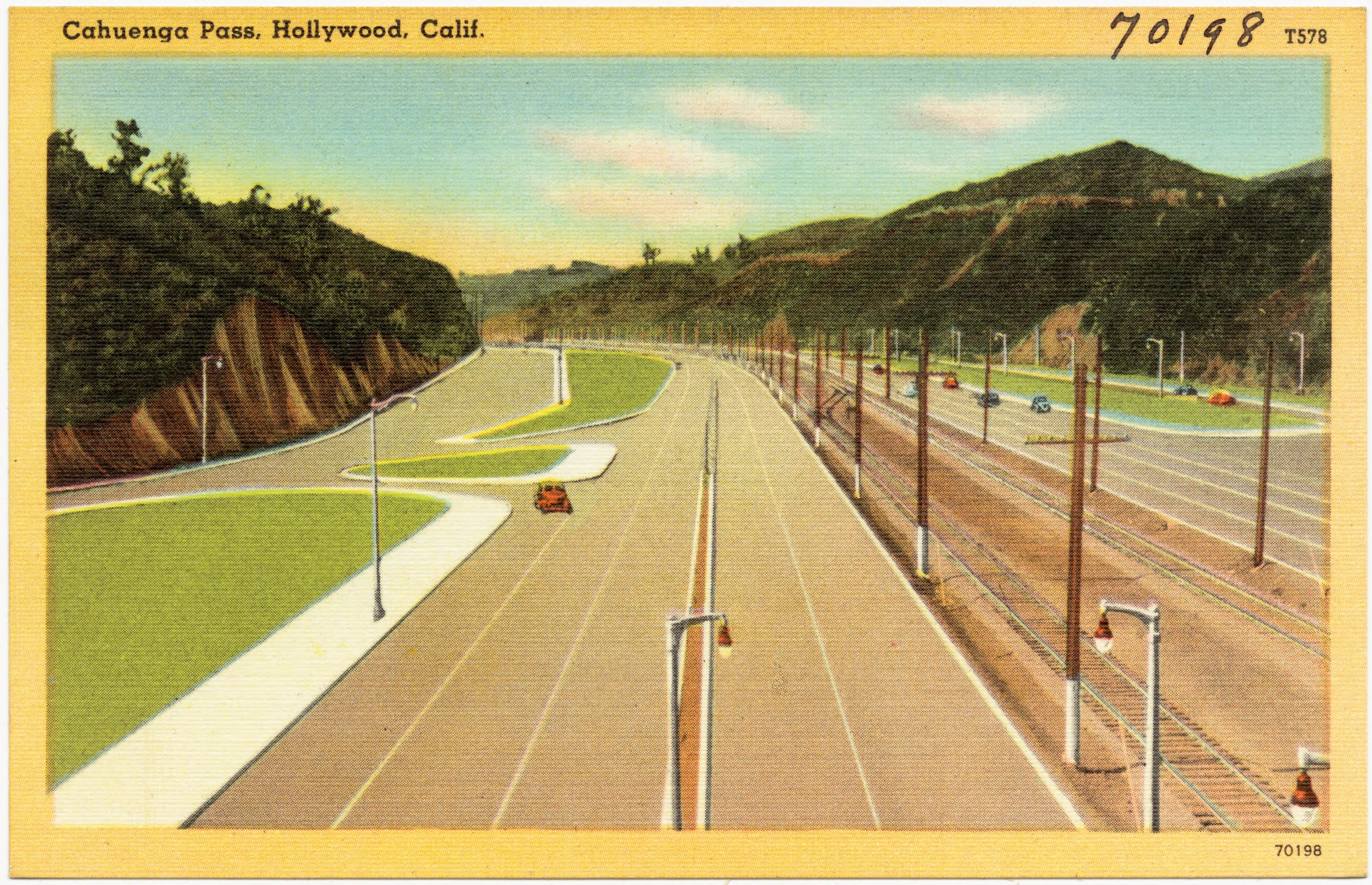
First segment built of the Hollywood Freeway through the Cahuenga Pass; Pacific Electric Railway trolleys ran down the center median of this freeway until 1952

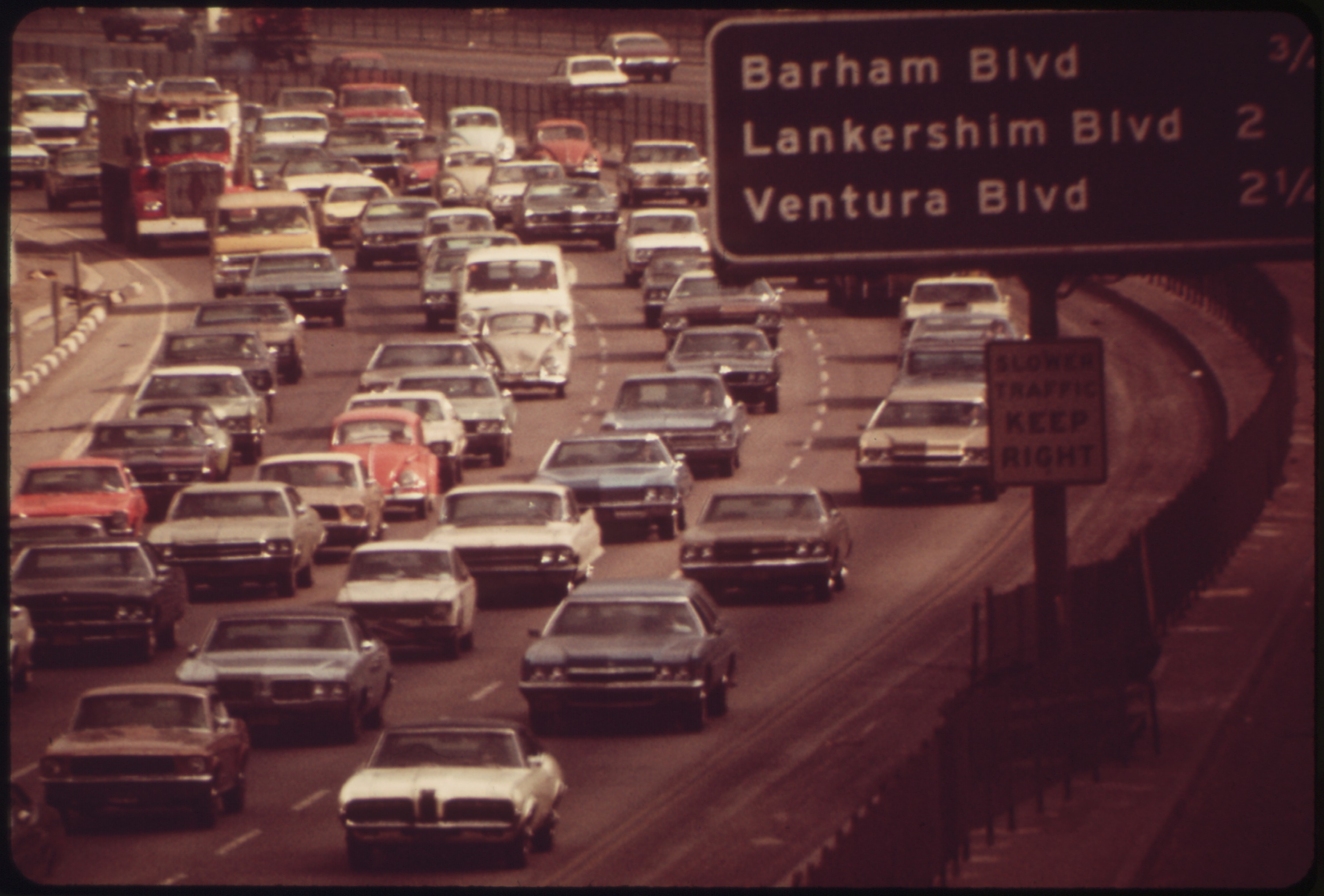
Hollywood freeway through the Cahuenga Pass in 1972

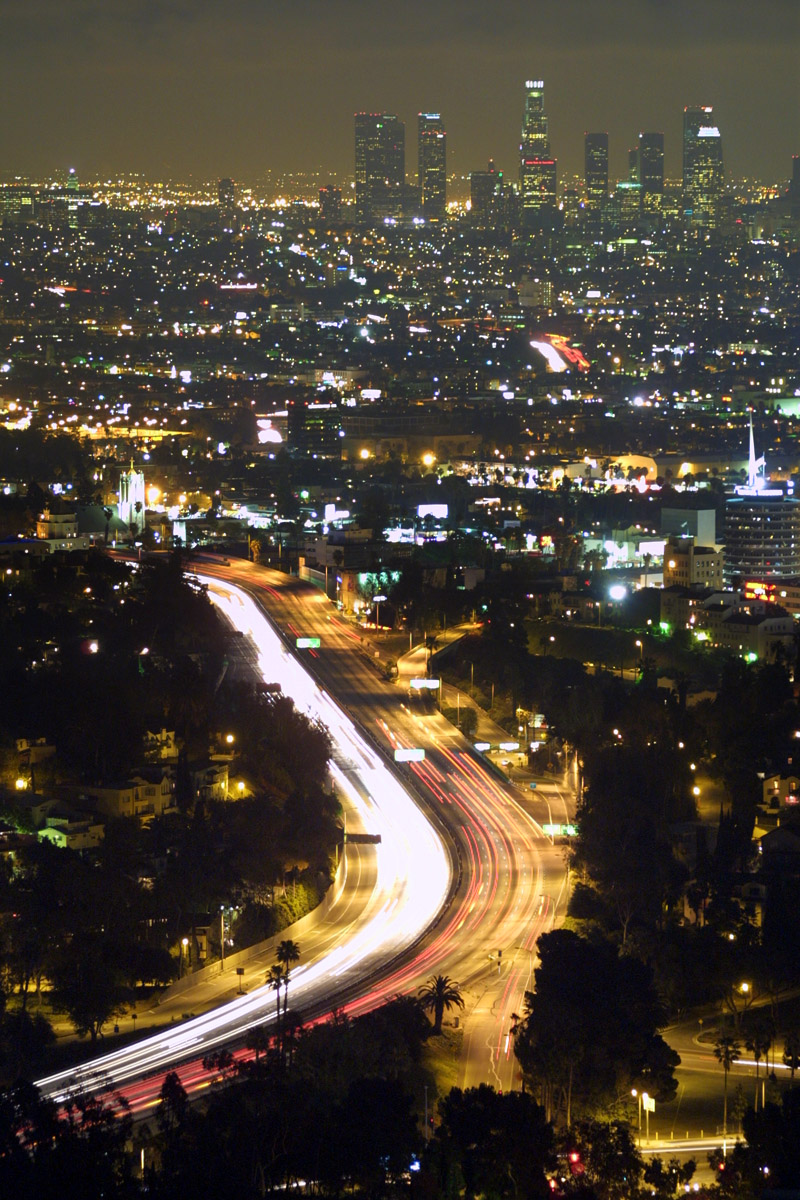
Hollywood Freeway at night with Downtown L.A. in the background.

The freeway runs from the Four Level Interchange in downtown Los Angeles to the Golden State Freeway in the Sun Valley district of Los Angeles in the San Fernando Valley. From the Four Level Interchange to its intersection with the Ventura Freeway in the southeastern San Fernando Valley (also known as the Hollywood Split), the freeway is signed as part of U.S. Route 101. Afterwards, it is signed as State Route 170 until its northern terminus at Interstate 5.

The intersection of the Hollywood, Santa Ana, and Harbor freeways and the Arroyo Seco Parkway, known as the Four Level Interchange, is one of the major landmarks in Los Angeles and a symbol of the city's post-World War II development.

=== State Route 170 ===
Route 170 is defined in section 470, subsection (a) of the California Streets and Highways Code, and that the highway is "from Route 101 near Riverside Drive to Route 5 near Tujunga Wash". In addition, the original 1963 definition of Route 170 included "Route 405 near Inglewood to Route 101 in Los Angeles" in a separate subdivision. This was defined in anticipation of the Laurel Canyon Freeway, which never came to fruition. In 1970, the definition was amended to subdivide the portion south of US 101 as "(a) Los Angeles International Airport to Route 90." and "(b) Route 2 to Route 101 in Los Angeles," deleting the segment between SR 2 and an extension of SR 90 that was never constructed. Subdivision (b) would run along Highland Avenue in Hollywood. In 2015, the state relinquished control of the segment along Highland Avenue to the city of Los Angeles, and the legislature amended the definition to reflect that as well as remove the final unconstructed freeway segment. However, subdivision (b) was also modified to require the city to still "maintain signs directing motorists to the continuation of Route 170".

SR 170 begins its northbound route at the junction with the Ventura Freeway, continuing the freeway northwards. US 101 leaves the freeway, merging onto the Ventura Freeway and heads west. SR 134 continues the Ventura Freeway, heading east. On the southbound side, a sign indicates "END Route 170". Also, a sign remains along southbound SR 170 that includes a white SR 134 shield, believed to be the last pre-1964 California highway shield. There is no interchange from SR 134 west to US 101 south. This connector route was put on hold pending the construction of the Laurel Canyon Freeway. Motorists intending to go in that direction must exit SR 134 at Cahuenga Boulevard, make a left, continue on Lankershim Boulevard and follow the signs near Universal Studios to re-enter on US 101. Likewise, there is no interchange from US 101 north to SR 134 east. Motorists intending to go in that direction must exit US 101 at Vineland Avenue, make a right, make another right on Riverside Drive and enter SR 134 on the left. This interchange is also known as the "Hollywood Split".

SR 170 then continues through the northeastern portion of the San Fernando Valley, finally merging onto northbound I-5. There is no connector route to I-5 south because the angle between the two freeways is too acute.

There are HOV lanes in operation 24 hours a day in each direction of SR 170 between I-5 and the Hollywood Split interchange. There is a direct connection from the northbound SR 170 HOV lanes onto the northbound I-5 HOV lanes, as well as from the southbound I-5 HOV lanes onto the southbound SR 170 HOV lanes. This makes it possible to connect with the I-5 HOV lanes as well as the SR 14 HOV lanes (from the I-5) without merging into regular lanes.

Both this portion of US 101 and the entirety of SR 170 are part of the California Freeway and Expressway System, and are part of the National Highway System, a network of highways that are considered essential to the country's economy, defense, and mobility by the Federal Highway Administration.

As of 2018, Caltrans is planning to add soundwalls to SR 170 in both directions between Sherman Way and the Hollywood Split. There are currently some neighborhoods located near the freeway, which cause noise pollution. Now that soundwalls are in place, it can reduce the noise and reduces smog.

== History ==
Plans for the Hollywood Freeway officially began in 1924 when Los Angeles voters approved a "stop-free express highway" between Downtown Los Angeles and the San Fernando Valley. The first segment of the Hollywood Freeway built was a one and a half mile stretch through the Cahuenga Pass. That segment opened on June 15, 1940. It was then known as the "Cahuenga Pass Freeway". Pacific Electric Railway trolleys ran down the center of this freeway until 1952. The next section of the freeway that stretched from the San Fernando Valley to Downtown Los Angeles opened on April 16, 1954 at a cost of $55 million ($659 million in 2025). The final section, north of the Ventura Freeway to the Golden State Freeway was completed in 1968.

A year after the Hollywood Freeway opened, it was used by an average of 183,000 vehicles a day, almost double the capacity it was designed to carry. Actor Bob Hope called it the "biggest parking lot in the world" in his routine.

The segment through Hollywood was the first to be built through a heavily populated area and requiring the moving or demolition of many buildings, including Rudolph Valentino's former home in Whitley Heights. The freeway was also designed to curve around KTTV Studios and Hollywood Presbyterian Church. Much of the rubble and debris from the buildings removed for the freeway's construction was dumped into Chávez Ravine, the current home to Dodger Stadium.

In 1967, the Hollywood Freeway was the first freeway in California to have ramp meters.

Near the Vermont Avenue exit, there's a seemingly over-wide center strip now filled with trees. This is where the never-built Beverly Hills Freeway was to merge with the Hollywood Freeway. Plans for the Beverly Hills Freeway were halted in the 1970s.

The Hollywood Freeway is an expansion of the original Cahuenga Parkway, a short six-lane freeway that ran through the Cahuenga Pass between Hollywood and Studio City. The Cahuenga Parkway featured Pacific Electric Railway "Red Car" tracks in its median, but by the 1950s these tracks were out of service due to radical reductions in Red Car service. The Pacific Electric right-of-way later accommodated an additional lane in each direction.

The second location of Los Angeles High School was in the path of the freeway. The school moved to its third and current location in 1917. The school buildings were converted into a school for habitually truant boys until 1948, when it was demolished to make way for the freeway.

SR 170 was originally supposed to run from the I-5 interchange to I-405 near the Los Angeles International Airport as the Laurel Canyon Freeway under the Laurel Canyon Boulevard, Crescent Heights Boulevard and La Cienega Boulevard alignments of today. In fact, much of La Cienega Boulevard between Manchester Avenue and Venice Boulevard was constructed to freeway standards, with several grade-separated interchanges, although it is now an expressway maintained by Los Angeles County.

California's legislature has relinquished state control of the segment of SR 170 along Highland Avenue, and thus that portion is now maintained by the City of Los Angeles. Despite the relinquishment, exit numbers assigned at SR 170 remain starting at 5A at the Hollywood Split instead of 1 or 0.

== Exit list ==
Except where prefixed with a letter, postmiles were measured on the road as it was in 1964, based on the alignment that existed at the time, and do not necessarily reflect current mileage. Postmile prefixes include: R reflecting a realignment in the route since then, M indicating a second realignment, L referring to an overlap due to a correction or change, and T indicating postmiles classified as temporary. Segments that remain unconstructed or have been relinquished to local control may be omitted. The entire route is in Los Angeles, Los Angeles County.

Postmile	Exit	Destinations	Notes
1.57 (Note: Indicates that the postmile represents the distance along US 101 rather than SR 170.)	—	US 101 south to I-5 south (Santa Ana Freeway) / I-10 east (San Bernardino Freeway) / SR 60 east (Pomona Freeway)	Continuation beyond SR 110
1.62	3B (Note: Exit numbers follow US 101 rather than SR 170.)	SR 110 (Arroyo Seco Parkway) to I-110 south (Harbor Freeway) – Pasadena, San Pedro	Signed as exit 3 northbound; south end of Hollywood Fwy; SR 110 exit 24A
see US 101 (exits 4A–12C)
11.65	13B	SR 134 east (Ventura Freeway) – Pasadena	Southbound exit and northbound entrance; signed as exit 5B on SR 170; SR 134 west exit 1A; south end of Hollywood Split
11.80 R14.50	—	South end of SR 170; North end of US 101 overlap	Hollywood Freeway south follows SR 170 exit 5A to US 101 south; SR 134 west exit 1B
11.80 R14.50	—	US 101 north (Ventura Freeway) – Ventura	Northbound exit and southbound entrance; SR 170 north follows US 101 north exit 13; north end of Hollywood Split
R14.78	6A	Riverside Drive to US 101 north	Southbound exit and northbound entrance
R15.37	6B	Magnolia Boulevard – North Hollywood	Signed as exit 6 northbound
R15.99	7	Burbank Boulevard	
R16.63	8A	Oxnard Street	
R17.25	8B	Victory Boulevard	
R18.27	9	Sherman Way	
R19.72	10	Roscoe Boulevard	Serves Kaiser Permanente Panorama City Medical Center
R20.10	11A	Sheldon Street	Northbound exit and southbound entrance
R20.55	♦	I-5 north	HOV access only; northbound exit and southbound entrance
R20.55	11B	I-5 north (Golden State Freeway) – Sacramento	No access to I-5 south; north end of SR 170/Hollywood Fwy; I-5 south exit 153B
1.000 mi = 1.609 km; 1.000 km = 0.621 mi: Concurrency terminus; HOV only; Incomplete access; Route transition

== See also ==
- Hollywood Freeway chickens
- Suggestion of rail transit along freeway, 1948
