= Hollywood Split =

Interchange in California

- Bruce T. Hinman Memorial Interchange
- Interactive map of Hollywood Split

Location
- North Hollywood, California
- Coordinates: 34.153508°N 118.377063°W
- Roads at junction: US 101 SR 134 SR 170

Construction
- Maintained by: Caltrans

The Hollywood Split (officially Bruce T. Hinman Memorial Interchange) is a freeway interchange in the San Fernando Valley area of Los Angeles, California. The interchange is officially named in the memory of California Highway Patrol officer Bruce T. Hinman, who was killed by a drunk driver. It is the interchange of the following routes:

- US 101 (Ventura Freeway/Hollywood Freeway) – Ventura, Los Angeles
- SR 134 east (Ventura Freeway) – Pasadena
- SR 170 north (Hollywood Freeway) – Sacramento

== Description ==
The interchange is the western terminus of SR 134 and the southern terminus of SR 170 and is also known as the interchange of the Hollywood Freeway and the Ventura Freeway. Motorists, especially visitors and newcomers to the Los Angeles area, find the interchange confusing for a number of reasons.

The Hollywood Freeway runs north–south through the interchange, while the Ventura Freeway runs east–west; however, the numerical designations of these roads change as they pass through the interchange: the name "Hollywood Freeway" is attributed to US 101 south of the interchange and SR 170 north of the interchange, while "Ventura Freeway" is attributed to US 101 west of the interchange and SR 134 east of the interchange. Thus, a motorist following US 101 must change cardinal directions, while a motorist following the Hollywood Freeway does not.

Additionally, the Ventura Freeway segment of US 101 has an east–west alignment, but is signed as a north–south highway due to the overall designation of US 101 as a north–south highway. Throughout the San Fernando Valley, the same onramp may be signed as both 101 North and 101 West or 101 South/101 East.

For motorists entering the interchange, the freeways' acute intersecting angles limits their ability to exit in certain directions of travel due to missing ramps. For example, motorists approaching the interchange on northbound US 101 may continue on northbound US 101 (in a westbound direction) or northbound on SR 170 but not to eastbound SR 134; signage instead instructs drivers to use the previous exit at Vineland Avenue to make the connection to SR 134.

== Dedication ==
The interchange is officially dedicated as the "Bruce T. Hinman Memorial Interchange." Hinman was a motorcycle officer with the California Highway Patrol who was killed by a drunk driver while assisting a stranded motorist at the interchange in 1995.
