= Woodman =

Woodman, Woodmen, or Woodman's may refer to:

== Businesses and associations ==
- The Woodman, a public house in Birmingham, England
- The Woodman, a former pub in Grenfell Street, Adelaide, South Australia
- Woodman's Markets, an American supermarket chain
- Woodman Labs, Inc, now GoPro
- WoodmenLife, or Woodmen of the World Life Insurance Society, a not-for-profit fraternal benefit society
- Modern Woodmen of America, an American fraternal benefit society
- Assured Life Association, formerly Woodmen of the World and/or Assured Life Association, an American fraternal benefit society

== Places ==
=== United States ===
- Woodman (town), Wisconsin, a town in Grant County
  - Woodman, Wisconsin, a village in Grant County
- Woodman station, a bus station in Los Angeles, California

=== Australia ===
- Woodman Point, a headland on the west coast of Western Australia

== Buildings ==
- Woodman Point Lighthouse, a lighthouse in Western Australia
- Woodmen Hall (Stuart, Florida)
- Woodmen Hall (Saint Onge, South Dakota)
- Woodmen of Union Building, in Hot Springs, Arkansas, U.S.
- W.O.W. Hall (Woodmen of the World Hall), in Eugene, Oregon, U.S.

== Fictional characters ==
- Tin Woodman, or the Tin Man, a fictional character in the Land of Oz by L. Frank Baum
- Wood Man, a character from the 1988 videogame Mega Man 2

== Other uses ==
- Woodman (surname), a surname
- Woodman (horse), a thoroughbred racehorse

== See also ==
- Logging, the process of cutting, processing, and moving trees to a location for transport
- Woodsman, a competitive, co-ed intercollegiate sport in the United States, Canada and elsewhere
