= Woodmen Hall =

Woodmen Hall may refer to:

- Woodmen Hall (Stuart, Florida)
- Woodmen Hall (Saint Onge, South Dakota)

== See also ==
- W.O.W. Hall (Woodmen of the World Hall), in Eugene, Oregon, U.S.
- Woodmen of Union Building, in Hot Springs, Arkansas, U.S.
