= Laurel Canyon (disambiguation) =

Laurel Canyon, Los Angeles is an area in the Hollywood Hills of California.

- Laurel Canyon Boulevard, a street that passes through Laurel Canyon in California
- Laurel Canyon station, a station in the Metro Busway system, Los Angeles, California
- Laurel Canyon station (Metro Rail), a planned station in the Metro Rail system, Arleta, California

Laurel Canyon may also refer to:

== Film and TV ==
- Laurel Canyon (film), a 2002 American drama movie
- Laurel Canyon (documentary), a 2020 documentary by Amblin Television

== Music ==
- Laurel Canyon, a 1968 album by Jackie DeShannon
- Blues from Laurel Canyon, a 1968 album by John Mayall

=== Songs ===
- "Laurel Canyon", song written and sung by Jackie DeShannon 1968
- "Laurel Canyon", written and sung by Wayne Carson, covered by Benny Mahan 1970
- "Laurel Canyon", song by Le Orme from List of songs about Los Angeles
- "Laurel Canyon", song by Game Theory from Supercalifragile, written Scott Miller
- "Laurel Canyon", song by Sam Smith from Love Goes
- "Laurel Canyon", song by The Church from Further/Deeper
- "Laurel Canyon Blvd" by Van Dyke Parks
- "Laurel Canyon Home" by John Mayall
- "Laurel Canyon Sky Song" by Larry McNeely
