= Valley College station =

Rapid-transit bus stop in San Fernando Valley, Los Angeles, California

Valley College
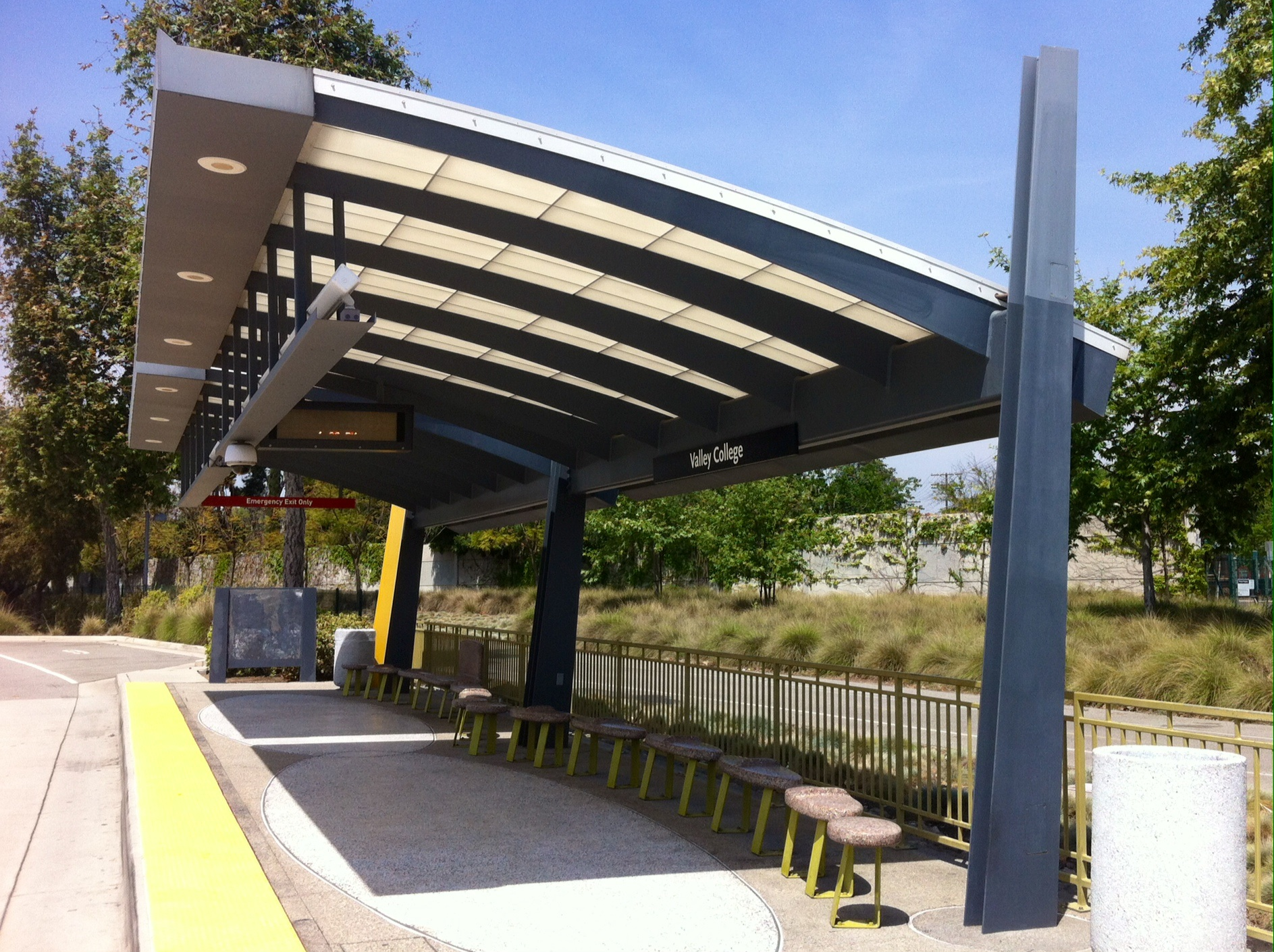
- Valley College station platform, 2015

General information
- Location: 13240 West Burbank Boulevard; Los Angeles, California
- Coordinates: 34.1719°N 118.4223°W
- Owner: Los Angeles County Metropolitan Transportation Authority
- Platforms: 2 side platforms
- Connections: Los Angeles Metro Bus; LADOT Commuter Express; LADOT DASH

Construction
- Cycle facilities: Racks and lockers
- Accessible: Yes

History
- Opened: October 29, 2005

Passengers
- FY 2025: 374 (avg. wkdy boardings)

Services
Preceding station	Metro Busway	Following station
Woodman toward Chatsworth	G Line	Laurel Canyon toward North Hollywood
Location

Valley College station is a station on the G Line of the Los Angeles Metro Busway system. It is named after the adjacent Los Angeles Valley College.

The station is in the Valley Glen district of the City of Los Angeles, located on Burbank Boulevard and Fulton Avenue, in the eastern San Fernando Valley.

== Service ==
=== Hours and frequency ===
G Line buses run 24 hours a day. Buses operate every eight minutes during peak hours on weekdays. They operate every ten minutes during the daytime on weekdays and most of the day on weekends. Night service on all days is every 20 minutes.

=== Connections ===
As of January 19, 2025, the following connections are available:

- Los Angeles Metro Bus: 167, 237
- LADOT Commuter Express: 549
- LADOT DASH: Van Nuys/Studio City

== Notable places nearby ==
The station is within walking distance of the following notable places:

- Los Angeles Valley College

== Station artwork ==
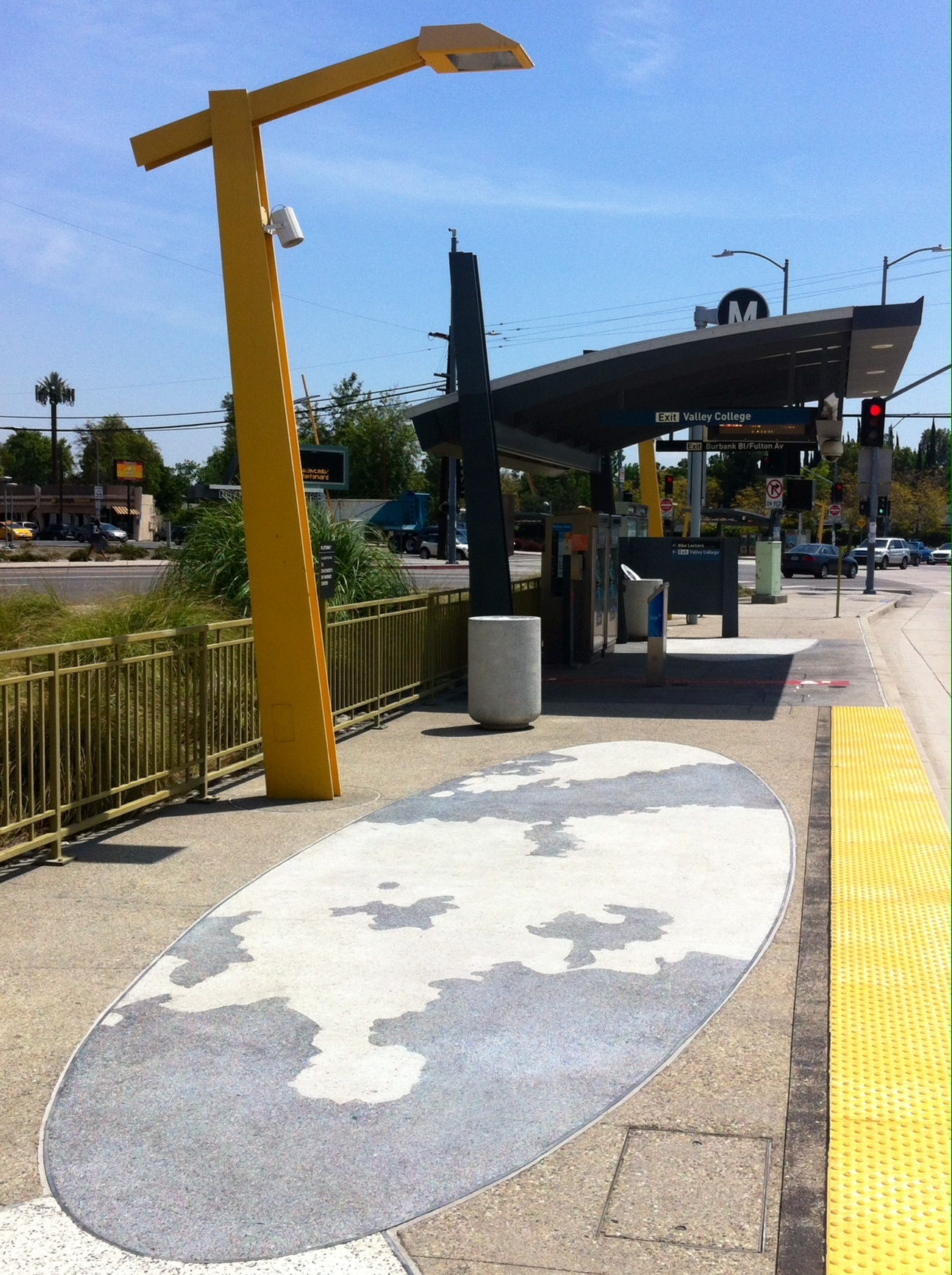
The entrance and floor mural of the station.

The floor mural and fence art in this station is called "Former Location/ Contemporary Portrait" by Laura London. It depicts of several old-fashioned black and white photos that reflects of the rock-and-roll ages and their trends, including some far-scaled portrait albums from the 1960s from The Rolling Stones. The art is also at the setting where Valley College used to exist during the earlier days, now California State University Northridge. The floor mural simply depicts of the black-and-white old age symbolism.
