= Coogee Hotel =

Heritage listed building in Coogee, Western Australia

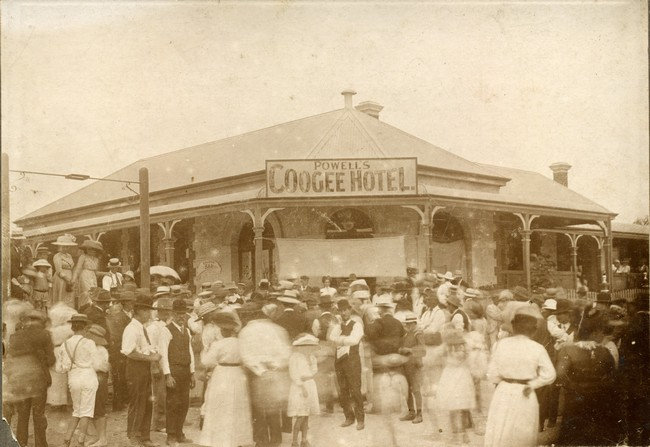
- Picnic at the Coogee Hotel, c. 1905.

- Location within Western Australia
- Alternative names: Seaside House Orphanage / Swan Anglican Children's Home

General information
- Location: 371 Cockburn Rd, Coogee, Coogee, Western Australia
- Coordinates: 32.1118°S 115.7654°E
- Construction started: 1899
- Renovated: 1947, 1992, 2020

Western Australia Heritage Register
- Designated: 14 May 2002
- Reference no.: 3648
- Owner: Main Roads, Western Australia

The Coogee Hotel is a historic former hotel and orphanage located in Coogee, 7 kilometres (4.3 mi) south of Fremantle in the City of Cockburn. After the Second World War, it was used as an orphanage by the Anglican Diocese of Perth. The building still stands on Cockburn Road, and is heritage listed by the State Government of Western Australia. In 2020, it was being redeveloped as a restaurant.

== Origins ==
In 1898, Walter Powell, a Fremantle clerk and merchant, was granted a publican's license to trade in liquor at a hotel opposite Coogee Beach. Powell had applied for this license and been rejected at least twice before, on the grounds that there was no need for another hotel in the area. There was already a small building on the site, an area known as Four-mile Well, with two bedrooms and two sitting rooms, owned by Powell's wife Letitia. The land was purchased in 1890, and definitely occupied by 1898. An earlier proposal had been to operate under the name The Traveller's Rest, but the name finally decided on was the Coogee Hotel, also called Powell's Coogee Hotel.

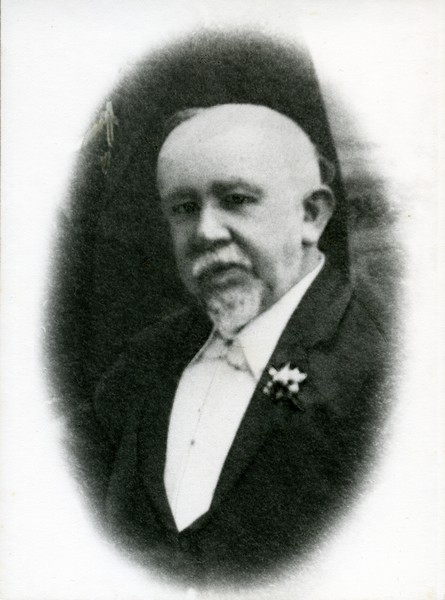
Walter Powell, founder of the Coogee Hotel

As soon as his license was granted, Powell commissioned extensions to be made in stone. The hotel would have twelve rooms altogether, including the public bar and three rooms for rent, as well as space for the family to live.

== Sports and racing ==
Powell's early years were focused on sports in the area. He encouraged local clubs to meet in the hotel or to modify their routes in order to pass by. He offered prizes to be given by the clubs in their competitions, and once awarded a prize to the first participant in a marathon race to pass the hotel. Cycling, cricket, hunting and shooting clubs all used the hotel as a base or a rest point in the first decade of the twentieth century.

He developed an unregistered racecourse on the land to the rear of the hotel, and held the first race on Easter Saturday, 1899. Four races were run: maiden pony race, handicap pony race, Galloway Handicap, and Coogee Stakes Handicap. Powell donated all the prizes himself. The racecourse was shaped like a tennis racket, with the handle being the home straight, and the races were treated as a day out for many local families who came to picnic on the hill above the hotel.

The racecourse was in operation for less than five years, run by Powell between 1899 and 1900, and by a local racing syndicate from 1903 to 1904.

== Boom years ==
In the early years of the twentieth century, Powell advertised his hotel and the Coogee area extensively in Western Australian newspapers, calling Coogee 'The garden of the West'. Locals knew it as a 'honeymoon hotel', with pleasant gardens and easy access to the beach. Powell actively sought new business, catering for large parties and picnics, like the Railway Institute employees' annual picnic, held in the grounds of the hotel for the first time in 1909. Picnics such as these, and parties like the race and sports meetings, could regularly bring crowds of over two hundred people into the hotel's vicinity.

Regular patrons of the hotel were local meat workers, lime kiln operators, market gardeners, and labourers. They often got the hotel into trouble with the law, stealing from other patrons and causing fights. But Powell himself was brought up in front of a court more than once, for Sunday trading and trading outside of proscribed hours, for dirty premises and allowing drunkenness, and once for watering down his whisky. The hotel was an established social meeting point for the market gardening and factory district, until Powell's death in 1923.

== Post office and store ==
In the mid-1920s, a small limestone building was erected on the hotel grounds, just to the north of the hotel itself. This was originally run as a store, serving the surrounding area with smallgoods and groceries. It was built by a Mr. Burnett, whose daughter Ruby married Powell's son, Frank, and whose family initially ran the store. It was taken over by Jock McKinnon, who married Powell's daughter, Lottie. There was a post office and store located less than a mile to the south of the hotel, run by Powell's sister Blanche and brother Fred. Upon their retirement in 1927, the post office was relocated to the store on the hotel land. On her death in 1951, Lottie McKinnon was known as the postmistress at Coogee.

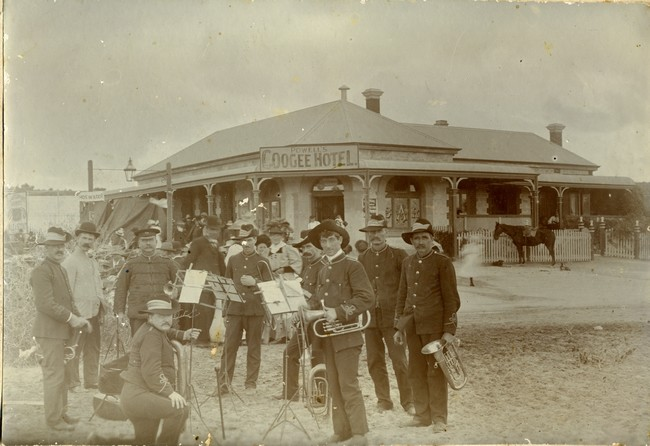
A group of men in uniforms stand in front of the Coogee Hotel holding instruments

== Decline of the hotel ==
Powell transferred his license to his son Frank Powell in 1922. After his death, the hotel license changed hands numerous times, though it was still owned by the Powell family. Members of the Gillham family were licensees in 1927, when the Licenses Reduction Board began to look into the number of licensed hotels in Perth. Though the case was passionately argued that the local population and the large numbers of local workers were frequent patrons of the hotel, in April 1927 the board decided not to renew the Coogee Hotel's license. It would expire in December that year. The board awarded the hotel's owners £A 828 for losses, equivalent to A$75,327 in 2022. In 1929 the hotel was advertised for rent as a holiday resort, close to the beach.

== Anglican Orphanage ==
=== Holiday home ===
In 1930, the Orphanages Committee of the Anglican Diocese of Perth purchased the premises for £A 641, intending to use it as a holiday house for their girls' home. The post office and store were rented from the property owners, and provided some income for the committee. The home was formally opened in 1931 by the Archbishop. Initially the arrangement was that the girls would stay in the old hotel, and the boys would camp out in the dunes on Coogee Beach, as had been the practice in earlier years. After a few years, it was suggested that the two groups take turns in the hotel, so that each stayed in it for three weeks during the summer. The building lay vacant for the remainder of the year.

=== Permanent orphanage ===
In 1946, Perth was suffering a severe post-war housing shortage, and squatting was a constant problem for property owners in affected areas. Orphanage officials were concerned that this would occur at Coogee, and agreed to set up a permanent branch there, under the supervision of Mrs. Ellen Logan. On March 28, 1946, Mrs. Logan and 25 children moved into the hotel permanently. Over the next two years, the property was renovated, adding a bathroom and laundry block and weather-proofing the main building.

They were helped out in their remote location by a group of local samaritans, known as the Meat Industries Orphanage Committee. These local business owners, employees, and families took great interest in the welfare of the children, taking them on outings, and raising money to buy them entertainments and furniture, including a projector to play films, a piano, a radio, and a television. The name of the site would change several times over the years, depending on the organisation of the orphanages. At first known as Perth Girls' Orphanage and Perth Boys' Orphanage, the institutions later amalgamated to become Swan Anglican Orphanages, and later still, Swanleigh. All of these names were applied at times to the Coogee property, and in addition the house was called Seaside House, the Coogee house, and the Willie A. Saw Seaside Home, after the death of a long-serving staff member.

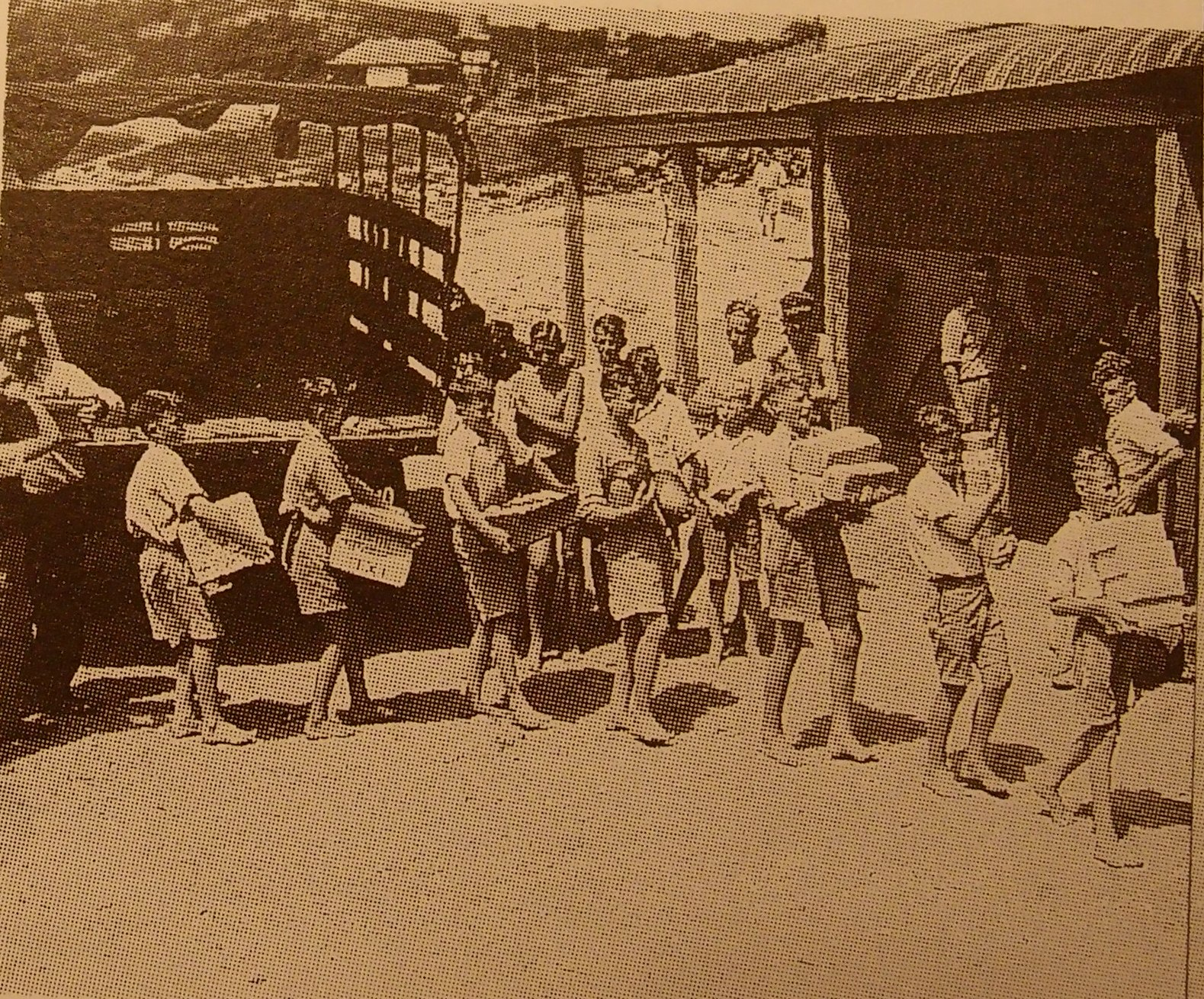
Boys unloading at Seaside House orphanage, Coogee, Jock Stewart presiding, 1940s.

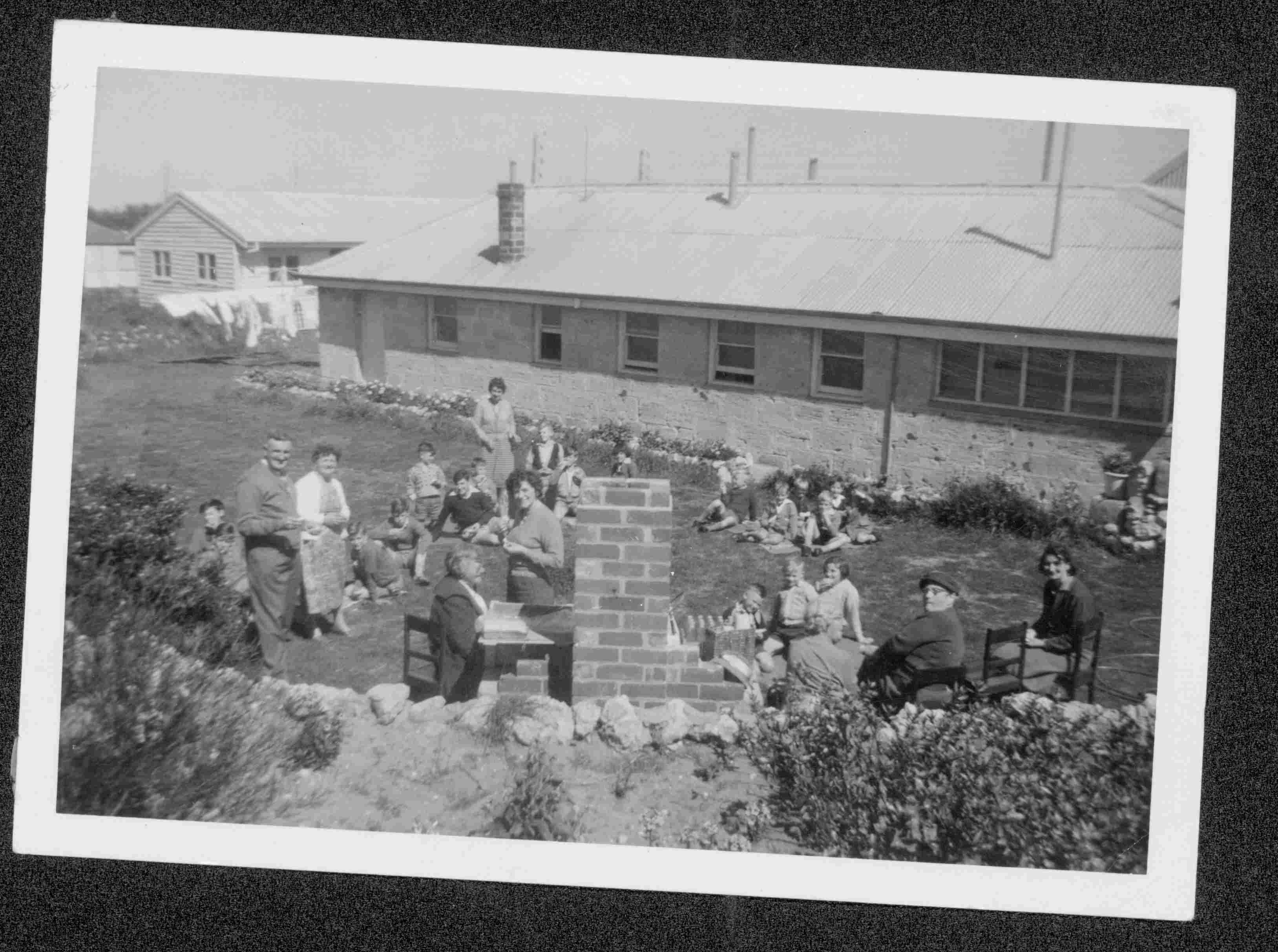
Barbecue area at Coogee (Seaside House orphanage) c. 1948

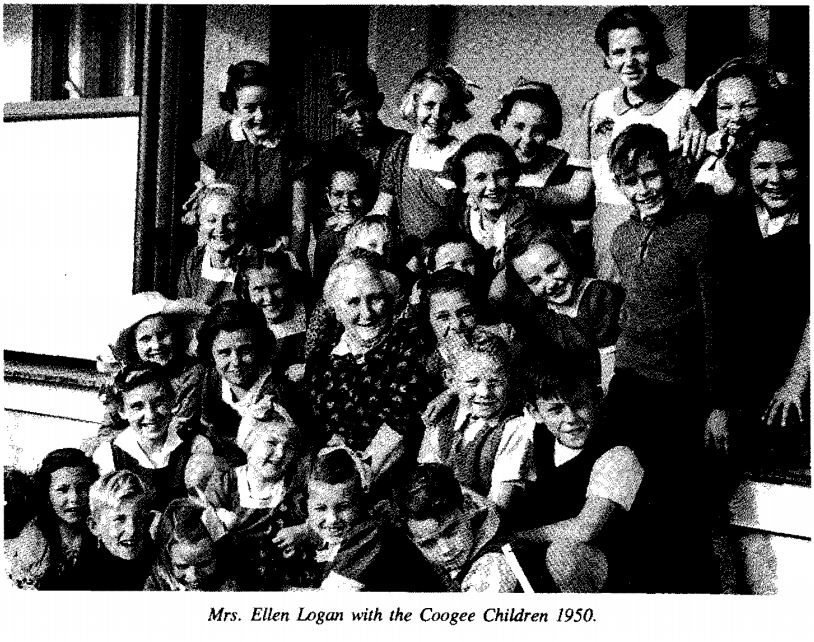
Orphans at Seaside House, Coogee, with Mrs Ellen Logan, 1950.

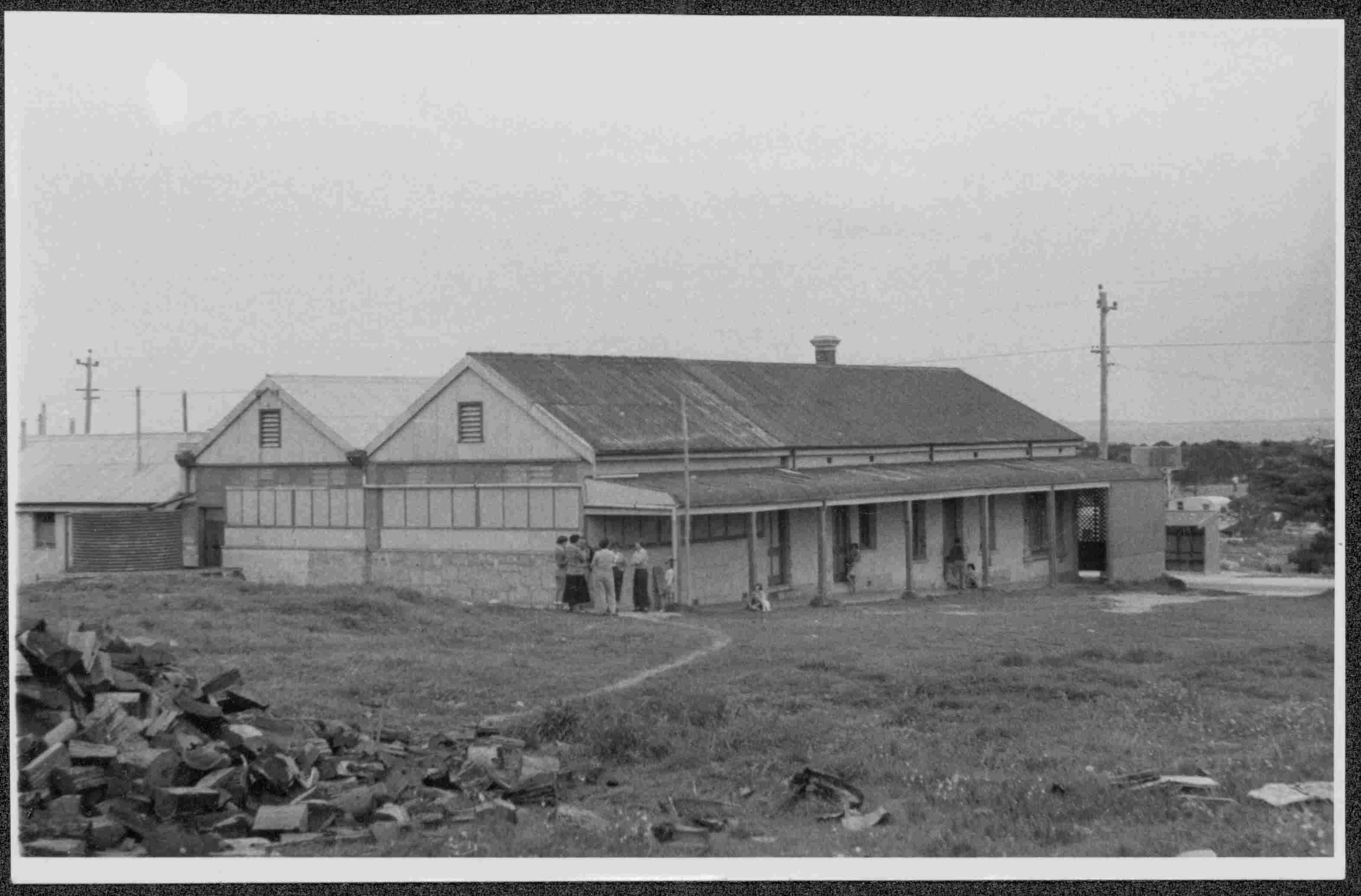
"Seaside House" Orphanage at Coogee Beach, September 1946

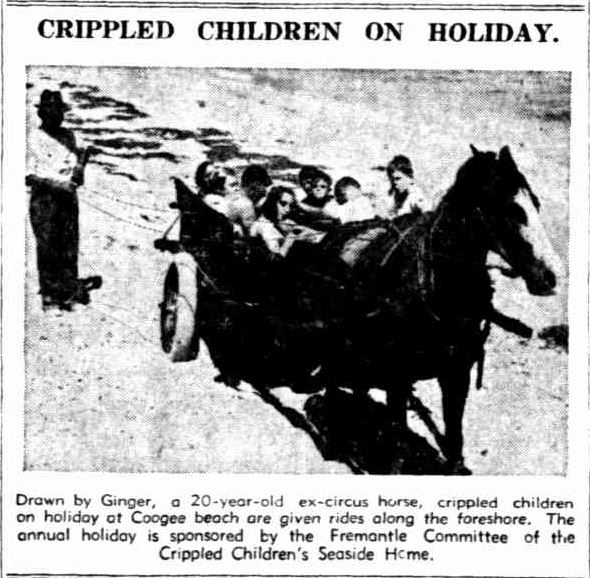
The disabled children who used to be entertained by the orphans at Seaside House, Coogee were taken on carriage rides as a day out.

=== Closure ===
In 1967, the Main Roads department announced that it was planning to resume the road and surrounding land on which the hotel was built to build a high-capacity road to Rockingham. They would buy the land and demolish the hotel, starting in 1969. The orphanage board decided that as the number of children in their care was declining, and the Coogee property's managers were considering retirement, they would close the branch and sell the hotel and land to Main Roads.

== Modern uses ==
The hotel was not demolished, and the road it sits on — originally Rockingham Road, now Cockburn Road — did not get developed into a high-capacity road to Rockingham. Instead, Main Roads focused on the development of Stock Road and the Kwinana Freeway, leaving the Coogee area relatively untouched. The hotel was rented to the Coogee Progress Association, for use as offices and meeting rooms, though never formally leased. The post office and store were later converted into a private residence.

Over the years there have been many planning proposals made for the use of the hotel, from a new bar and restaurant and a new hotel, through to a mixed retail and office space, with playgrounds, gardens, and carparks surrounding it. In 1990, Jana Holdings Pty Ltd was granted an eleven-year lease with permission to extend and renovate the existing structure. This resulted in the addition of the north wing of the building, deviating from the style of the old hotel in certain points, such as the height of walls and the style of verandah. The building was heritage listed in 2001.

Restaurateur Nic Trimboli and property developer Adrian Fini bought the building from Main Roads in 2017 with the intention of opening the building as a restaurant. The restaurant refurbishment was underway in December 2019, and reopened as Coogee Common on 5 March 2020.
