= Woodman (surname) =

Woodman is a surname. Notable people with this surname include:

- Andy Woodman (born 1971), English football manager
- Arturo Woodman (1931–2023), Peruvian engineer and politician
- Dean Woodman (1928–2019), American investment banker and co-founder of Robertson Stephens
- Deon Woodman (born 2002), Kenyan footballer
- Dorothy Woodman (1902–1970), British socialist activist and journalist
- Francesca Woodman (1958–1981), conceptual photographer in the late 1970s and 1980
- Fred Woodman (born 1958), New Zealand rugby union player
- Freddie Woodman (born 1997), English footballer
- Frederic T. Woodman (1871–1949), American politician and mayor of Los Angeles
- H. Rea Woodman (1870–1951), American author and educator
- Jack Woodman (1914–1984), English footballer
- Jin Woodman (born 2009), Australian wheelchair tennis player
- Kawhena Woodman (born 1960), New Zealand rugby union player
- Marion Woodman (1928–2018), Canadian psychoanalyst and writer
- Nick Woodman (born 1975), American businessman founder of GoPro
- Pierre Woodman (born 1963), French porn director
- Portia Woodman (born 1991), New Zealand rugby player
- Richard Woodman (born 1944), English novelist and naval historian
- Richard Woodman (martyr) (1520s–1557), English Protestant martyr
- Trevor Woodman (born 1976), English rugby union footballer
- William Robert Woodman (1828–1891), co-founder of the Hermetic Order of the Golden Dawn

== See also ==
- Woodman (disambiguation)
- Wood (surname)
