= Pleasant Street Historic District (Hot Springs, Arkansas) =

Historic district in Arkansas, United States

- U.S. National Register of Historic Places
- U.S. Historic district
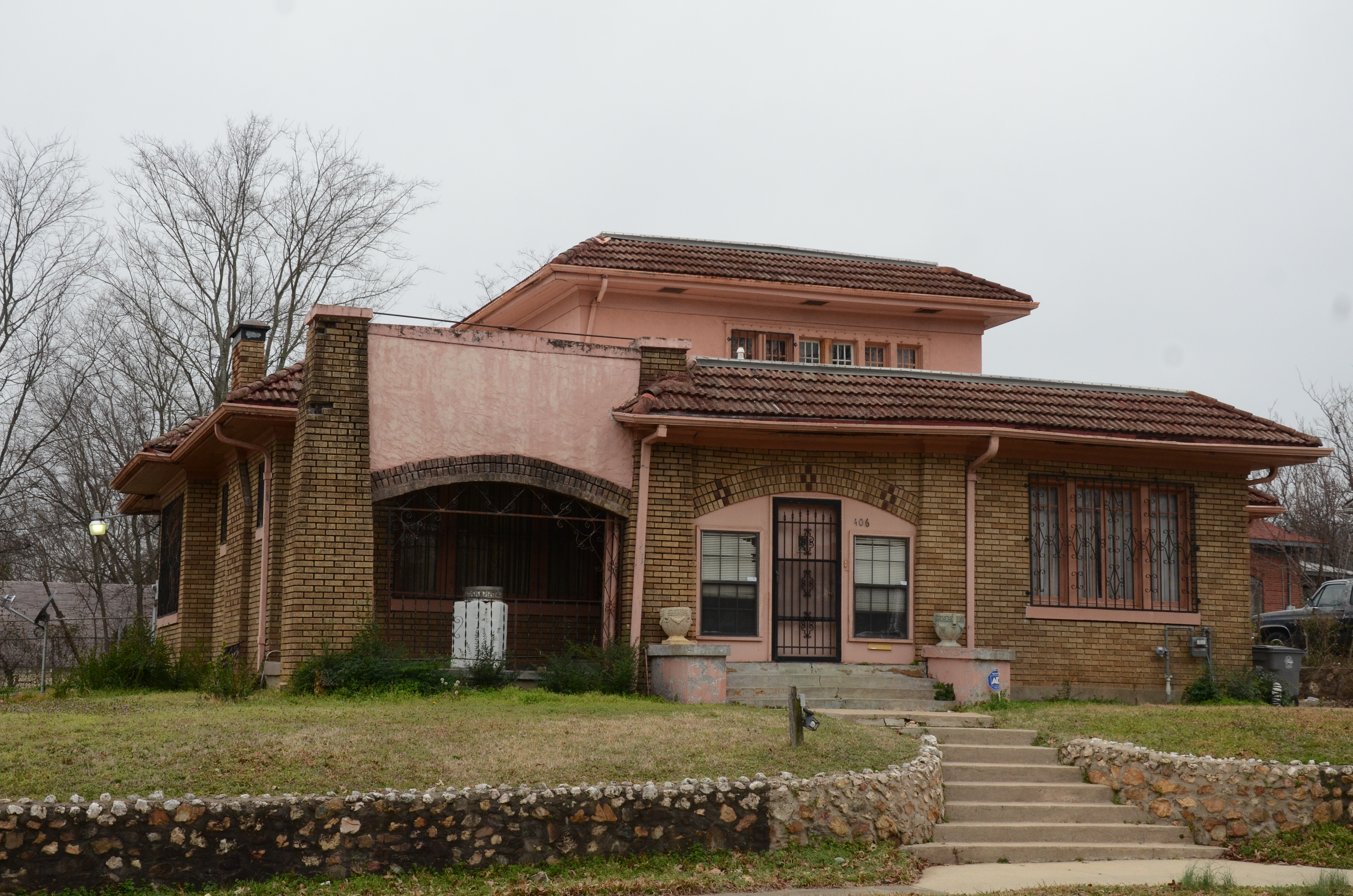

- Location within Arkansas Location within the United States
- Location: Roughly bounded by Malvern Av., Pleasant, Church, Gulpha, Garden, Grove and Kirk Sts., Hot Springs, Arkansas
- Coordinates: 34°30′26″N 93°2′52″W
- Area: 30 acres (12 ha)
- Built: 1913
- Architect: Webb, John L.
- Architectural style: Colonial Revival, Bungalow/American craftsman
- NRHP reference No.: 03000532
- Added to NRHP: June 20, 2003

The Pleasant Street Historic Historic District is a historic district encompassing the historic African-American community area of Hot Springs, Arkansas. It is located just southeast of the city's famous Bathhouse Row area, centered on a four-block stretch of Pleasant Street between Jefferson and Church Streets. The 30-acre (12 ha) district includes 93 buildings, most of them residential. The area was developed between about 1900 and 1950, with most of the development taking place after 1920. Prominent non-residential buildings include the Visitor's Chapel A.M.E. Church at 317 Church Street, and the Woodmen of Union Building, a four-story brick building on the 500 block of Malvern Avenue.

Contractor and philanthropist John Lee Webb (1877–1946) lived in the area. His prominent brick home at 403 Pleasant Street remains in the district. A community center was named for his daughter. The district was listed on the National Register of Historic Places in 2003.

== See also ==
- National Register of Historic Places listings in Garland County, Arkansas
