= Thomas Watson (surveyor) =

Thomas Watson was a surveyor and early settler of the Swan River Colony in what is now Western Australia.

Little is known of his early life, but he was trained as a surveyor before arriving at the Swan River Colony as part of Thomas Peel's settlement scheme, on board Gilmore in December 1829. He brought surveying instruments with him, but at first he did not seek surveying work, preferring to establish himself as a farmer upon his grant. He was independently wealthy and had brought servants with him to work his land grant. But in February 1830 his camp was burnt out in a bushfire and he lost £600 worth of goods, including most of his surveying tools. He used his remaining capital to support himself and his servants for the next year, but in 1831 he had no money left and had to release his employees from their agreements. In April 1831 he married Ann Smythe.

== Timber merchant and saw-miller ==
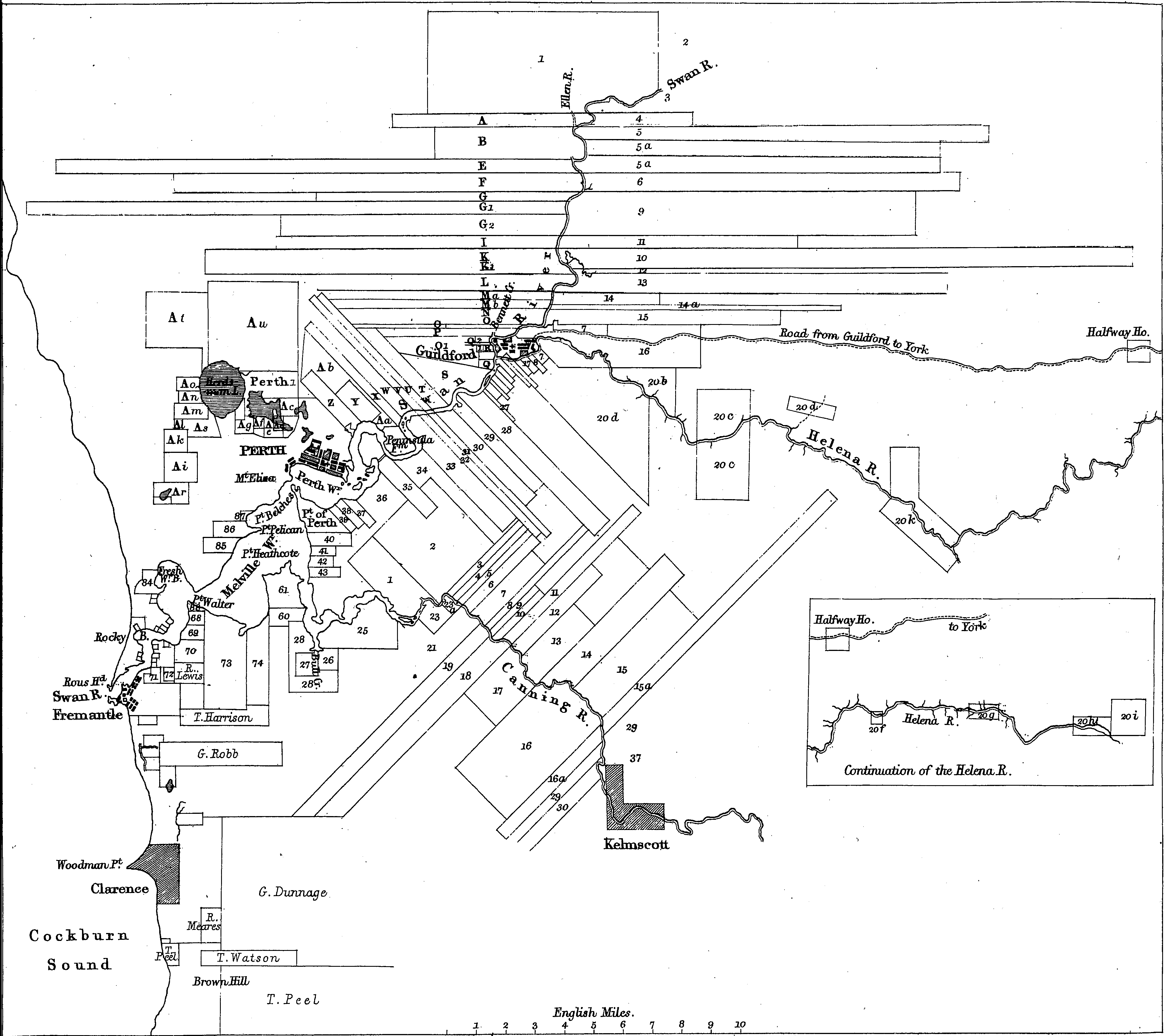
Early land grants in the Swan River colony, 1839. Thomas Watson's grant is in the lower left, beside Thomas Peel's.

Watson was granted 1000 acres of land at the southern end of Thomsons Lake, which he used to source timber. It corresponded roughly with today's Wattleup. In May 1833 he was advertising his timber for sale as "30 tons of very superior mahogany, in the log, well seasoned". The timber was tuart. He obtained an order for 50 tons of timber, but could not find the men to cut it and by the time he had enlisted a labour force the men who had placed the order had already left the colony. He attempted to obtain a government contract for his timber, and in the meantime transported planks to Thomas Peel's Clarence settlement to be exported. The export ships never arrived, and Watson gave up his attempts to work his timber grant. In 1839, his entire grant was bought for £60 by George Leake, a Fremantle solicitor.

== Surveyor ==
Due to his financial hardships, in 1831 he applied to the Governor for a job and was offered the position of temporary chainer in the Survey Department, which he carried on side by side with his timber enterprise. Later he worked for the Department of Council and Audit, assessing settlers' property holdings to calculate how much land to grant them, but this position became redundant as the flow of settlers fell to almost zero. Finally he took a position as a clerk in the Colonial Secretary's office for a very small wage, but eventually gave up his hopes of living in the Perth area and quit to head south.

In 1834, Watson moved to the town of Mandurah, in order to participate in the extensive surveys scheduled for the Leschenault district. He was involved in several large surveys, including the original survey of the Bunbury town site, along with work in York and Mandurah itself. Evidence suggests that at least some of Watson's work was inferior in quality. Some of his surveys had to be re-done by others, and his Bunbury plans were discarded.

In October 1835 he took a group of people intending to settle new land to the Murray River, near Thomas Peel's land. From there he continued on and completed a partial survey of the Murray River east to the Serpentine River and Pinjarra, recording the type of land, bush, flora and fauna he encountered along the way.

The late 1830s saw Watson paid for two surveys; one unspecified in connection with roads and bridges to the southern districts, and one for a road from Fremantle to the Dandalup ford. It was stated that the roads that Watson and others had surveyed in these districts were "perfectly impassable for 7 or 8 months of the year" due to flooding .

Watson is credited as having recorded the Aboriginal word "Kougee" in 1841, which became the word Coogee and refers to a lake and settlement area in Cockburn. Similarly he is credited as recording the name Banganup Lake in the Cockburn area during his 1841 surveys. He is also credited as naming The Spectacles in modern-day Kwinana in the same year. The maps of these surveys are held in the State Records Office of WA.

== Mail carrier ==
Watson became the first mail contractor for the Murray District in 1841, receiving £80 for the year to travel between Pinjarra and Bunbury. He surveyed the Pinjarra-Fremantle Road in the same year. He lost the tender in 1842, and focused on working the ferry crossing and running a hotel at Mandurah.

In 1847 Watson's tender to carry mail between several south-west settlements was accepted by George Fletcher Moore, the Colonial Secretary. He was to carry mail once a month "from Fremantle to Albany via Mandurah, Australind, Bunbury, Busselton, and Kojonup; also a branch mail between Mandurah and Pinjarrah". Until this time, it had been assumed that the journey between Fremantle and Albany took two weeks. Watson discovered a new route and managed the journey in five days. He guarded the specifics of his new route for fear that the government would undercut him and he would lose his contract. Later that year his diary of one of these journeys was published in the colonial newspaper, describing the hardships of bushland, weather, and poor roads encountered along the way. He also took passengers on this route, and advertised his prices for parcels and transport between the towns he visited. A return trip between Fremantle and Mandurah cost 15 shillings, and a return trip between Fremantle to Albany cost £8. Parcels under 1lb cost 1/6 to send to Albany, parcels over 1lb cost 4 shillings.

During his time as mail carrier he continued to survey roads and build bridges, using soldiers stationed at Albany and Kojonup to carry out the work. In 1848 his report on the improvements of roads outside Albany was published in the newspaper.

He was generally held to have performed his role well and was highly regarded at the end of his contract in 1849.
