= Visitors Chapel AME =

Historic church in Arkansas, United States

- U.S. National Register of Historic Places
- U.S. Historic district – Contributing property
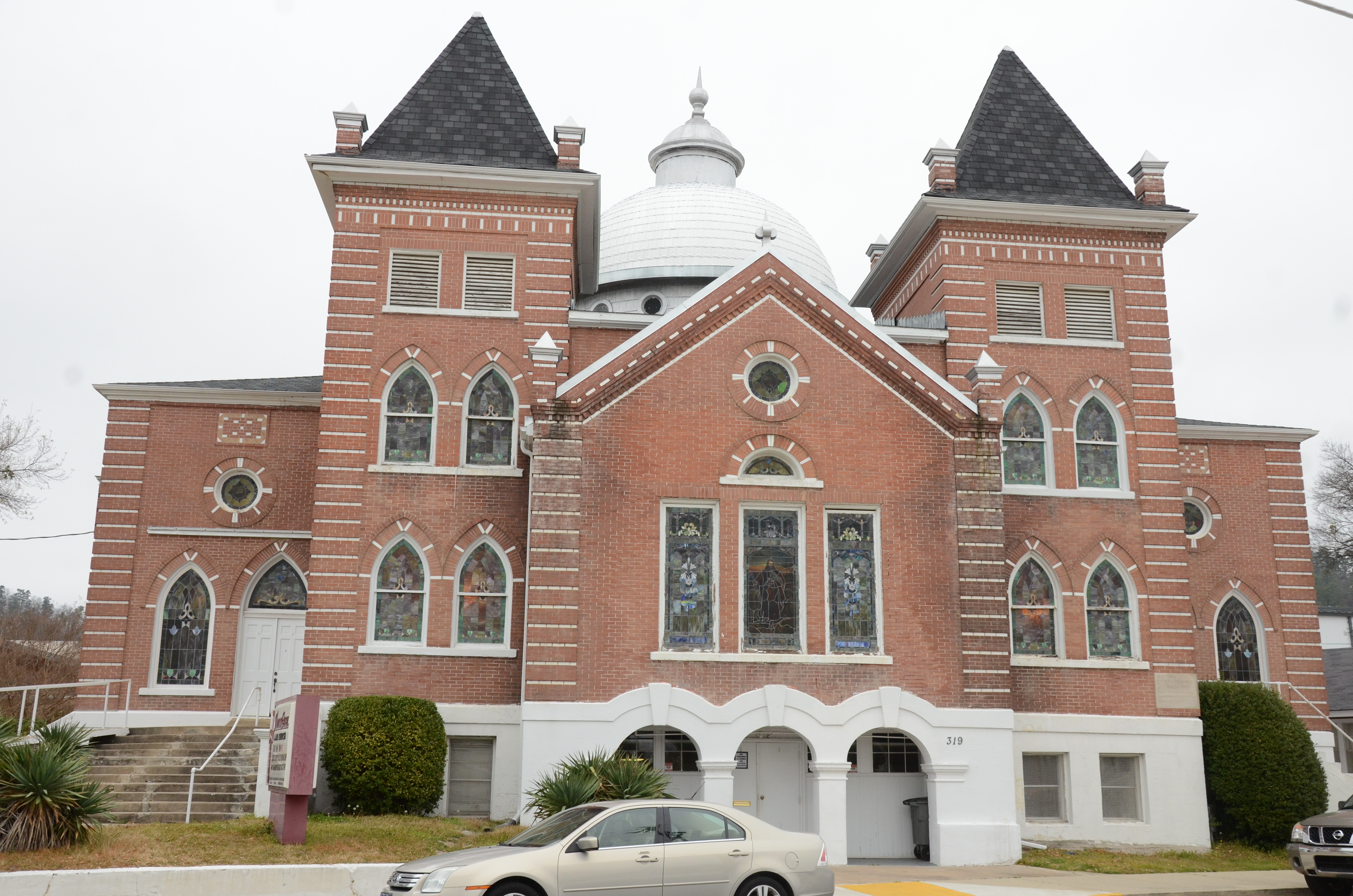

- Location within Arkansas Location within the United States
- Location: 319 Church St. Hot Springs, Arkansas
- Coordinates: 34°30′31″N 93°3′1″W
- Area: less than one acre
- Built: 1913
- Architect: Northington, J.H..
- Architectural style: Late Gothic Revival, Classical Revival
- Part of: Pleasant Street Historic District (ID03000532)
- NRHP reference No.: 95000682

Significant dates
- Added to NRHP: June 2, 1995
- Designated CP: June 20, 2003

The Visitors Chapel AME is a historic church building at 319 Church Street in Hot Springs, Arkansas. It is a Three story brick building, designed in a distinctive combination of Classical and Gothic Revival styles by J.H. Northington and built in 1913. The church has a Greek cruciform plan with a dome at the center, with a Classical gable-front flanked by towers with Gothic windows. An African Methodist Episcopal congregation is believed to have existed in Hot Springs since the 1870s; this building is the fourth it is known to have built. It is named in honor of the many outsiders who come to worship with the regular congregants.

The building was listing on the National Register of Historic Places in 1995.

== See also ==
- National Register of Historic Places listings in Garland County, Arkansas
