= Coogee Beach =

Coogee Beach may refer to:

- Coogee, New South Wales, beach in Sydney, NSW, Australia
- Coogee, Western Australia, beach in Perth, WA, Australia
