= Woodman station =

Bus rapid transit station in Los Angeles, California

Woodman/Valley Glen
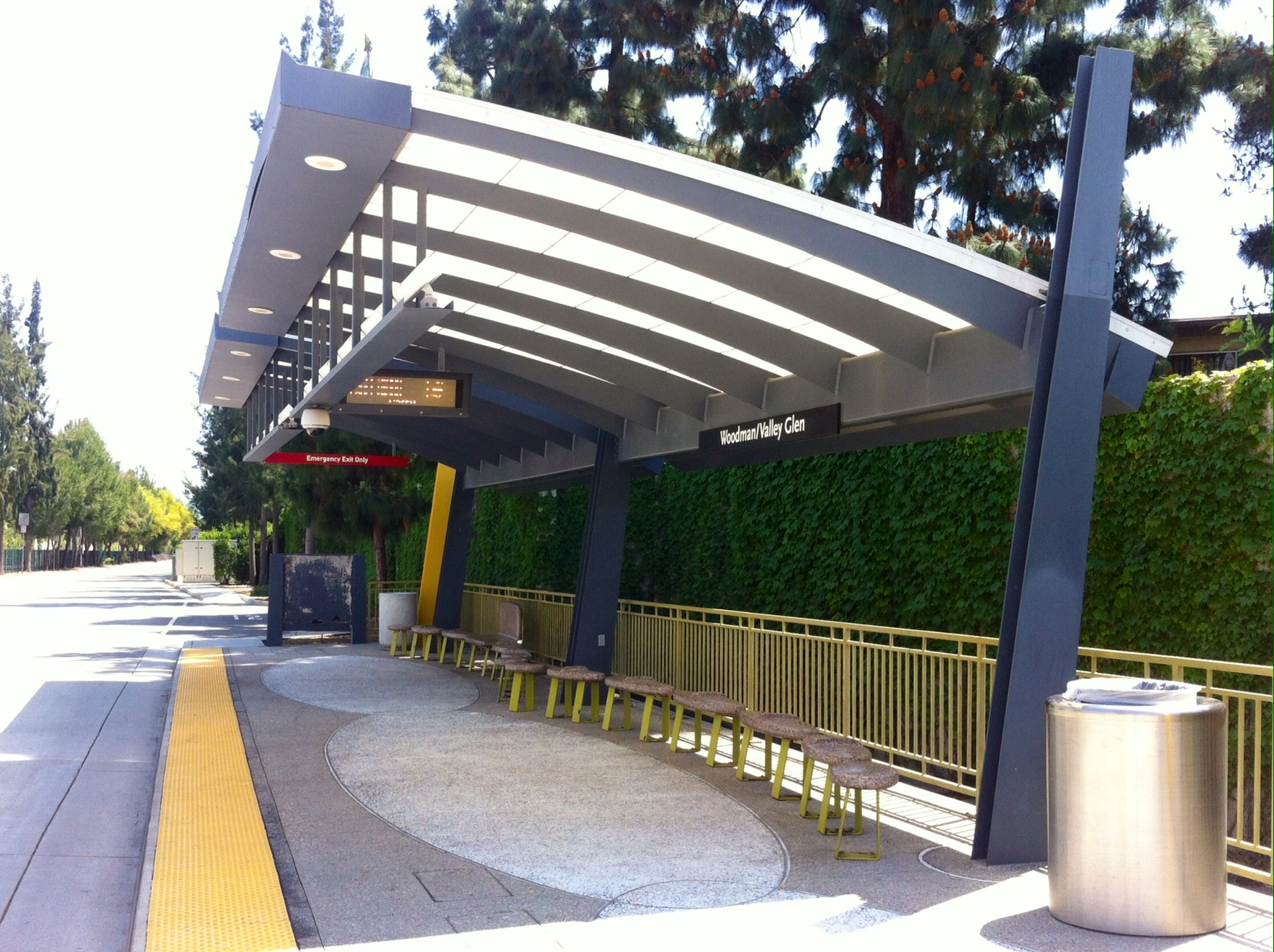
- Woodman/Valley Glen station platform in 2015

General information
- Location: 13620 & 13622 West Oxnard Street; Los Angeles, California
- Coordinates: 34.1792°N 118.4298°W
- Owner: Los Angeles County Metropolitan Transportation Authority
- Platforms: 2 side platforms
- Connections: Los Angeles Metro Bus

Construction
- Cycle facilities: Racks and lockers
- Accessible: Yes

History
- Opened: October 29, 2005

Passengers
- FY 2025: 377 (avg. wkdy boardings)

Services
| Preceding station | Metro Busway | Following station |
|---|---|---|
| Van Nuys Detoured to Oxnard/Van Nuys toward Chatsworth | G Line | Valley College toward North Hollywood |
Location

Woodman station (signed as Woodman/Valley Glen) is a station on the G Line of the Los Angeles Metro Busway system. It is named after adjacent Woodman Avenue, which travels north-south and crosses the east-west busway route. The station is in the Valley Glen district of Los Angeles, in the San Fernando Valley. The station is located next to Oxnard Street, and east of Woodman Avenue.

== Service ==
=== Hours and frequency ===
G Line buses run 24 hours a day. Buses operate every eight minutes during peak hours on weekdays. They operate every ten minutes during the daytime on weekdays and most of the day on weekends. Night service on all days is every 20 minutes.

=== Connections ===
As of January 19, 2025, the following connections are available:

- Los Angeles Metro Bus: 154, 158

== Station artwork ==
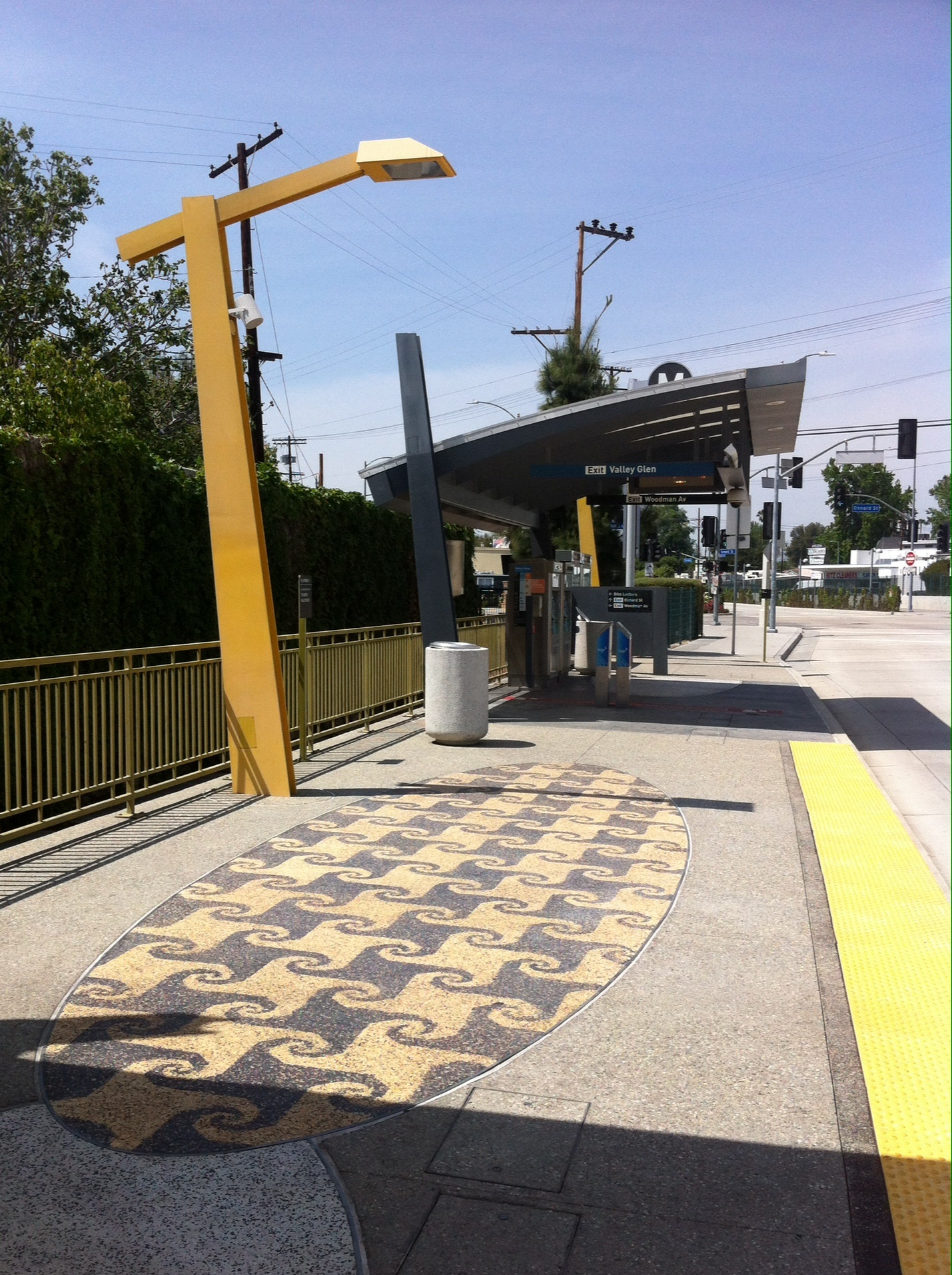
The entrance and floor mural of the station.

The terrazzo paving areas and porcelain enamel steel fence panels at this station are called "Journey to California" by Daniel Marlos. They resemble quilt designs that are centuries old and have descriptive names that correspond to important events. ‘Road to California’, ‘Railroad Crossing’, ‘Wandering Paths’, and ‘Wagon Wheel’ are just a few that actually deal with transportation. The selected pattern, Journey to California, is a pattern that references both California and travel.
