= Woodman Point Lighthouse =

Heritage listed lighthouse in Western Australia

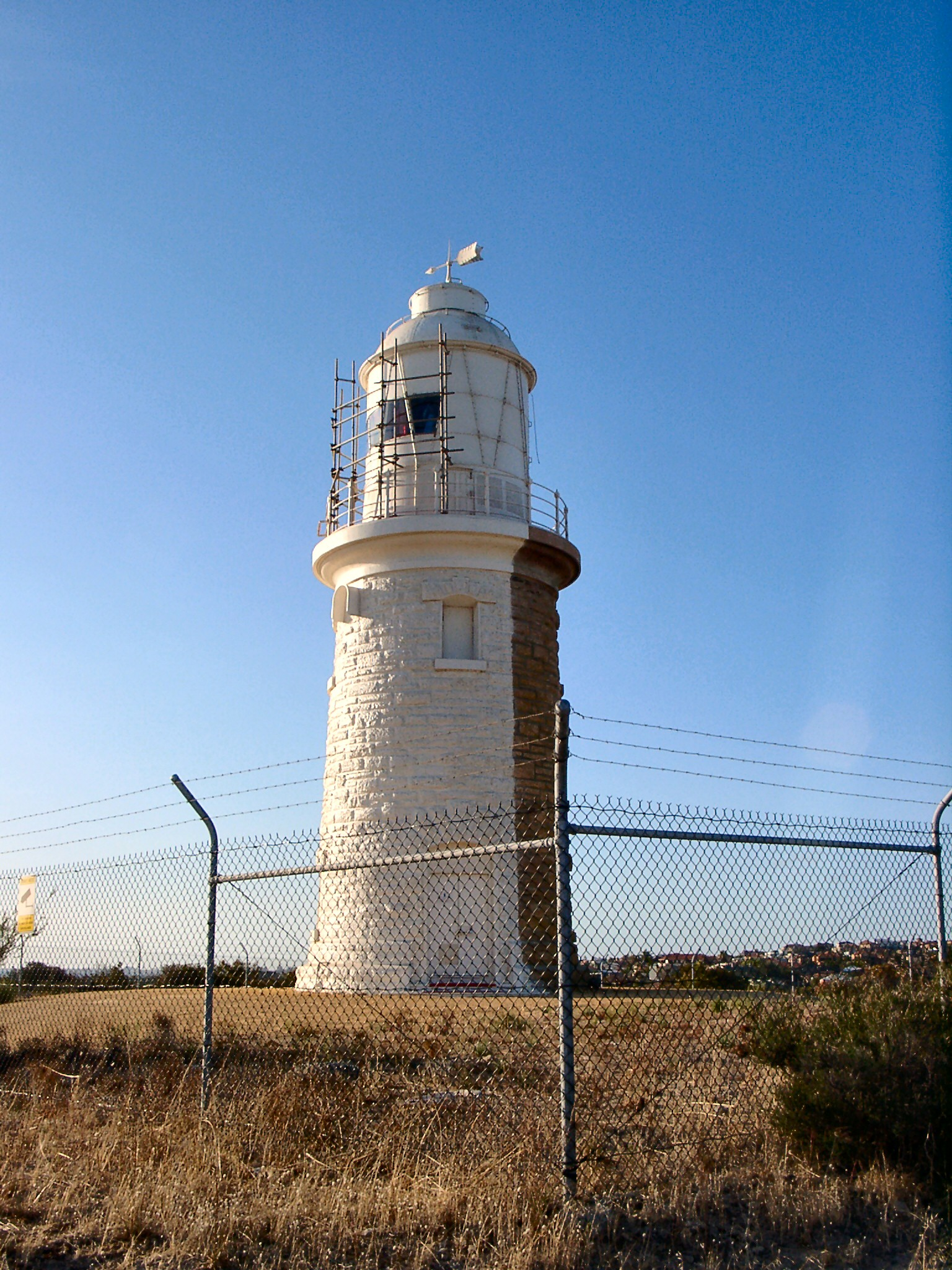
- Woodman Point Lighthouse
- Location: Woodman Point, City of Cockburn, Australia
- Coordinates: 32°07′51″S 115°46′11″E

Tower
- Constructed: 1902
- Construction: limestone
- Automated: 1955
- Height: 13 m (43 ft)
- Shape: cylinder
- Markings: half white (seawards) and unpainted (landwards), white lantern room
- Operator: Fremantle Ports
- Heritage: State Registered Place

Light
- Focal height: 37 m (121 ft)
- Range: 22 nmi (41 km; 25 mi), 8 nmi (15 km; 9.2 mi)
- Characteristic: Oc WRG 30s, Oc G 5s

Western Australia Heritage Register
- Designated: 13 August 2004
- Reference no.: 508

Woodman Point Lighthouse, also known as Coogee Lighthouse, is a lighthouse in Western Australia. Located on Woodman Point, it has been in continuous operation since August 1902. It is 9.8 metres (32 ft) high, and constructed of locally quarried limestone. It is located on the highest point of land in the area, which is unusually far inland for a lighthouse. On the same block of land are two Federation Bungalow style keepers' cottage, also built of limestone.

The lighthouse is operated and maintained by Fremantle Ports for the benefit of shipping approaching Fremantle Harbour. The lighthouse is a leading light with three sectors: green to the east, a bright (white) central sector and red to the west. Most Western Australian lighthouses were taken over by the Commonwealth in 1915. Because Woodman Point was not considered to be a 'coastal light' it remained under state control.

The lighthouse is not open to the public. The keepers' cottages have not been used as such since the light was electrified in 1955; currently, they are used as private residences.

== History ==
Originally known as Gage Roads leading light, it provided a leading light for vessels heading to Fremantle Harbour. Previously shipping had relied on the lighthouses on Rottnest and Arthur Head to navigate to the port. The Arthur Head light was a fixed white light. Increasing development along the coast made it difficult for ships to distinguish the lighthouse from other lights. As an example, the voyage of the Stuttgart would have ended in tragedy had her captain not realised in time that he was not steering for the Arthur Head lighthouse, but a bright light on the Osborne Hotel in Claremont!

The need for a leading light was put to the government by the captains of various mail steamers. Construction of the Gage Roads leading light commenced in October 1901. The tower and cottages were built by contractor W. C. Rose under a Public Works Department tender for £2,383. It had a kerosene vapour lamp, and first order lens and lantern supplied by Chance Brothers, Smethwick, England, and an occulting timing pattern that hid the light for three seconds every 30 seconds.

There is a widely circulating story that the red and green sector shades were incorrectly installed, that is, in the reverse order. Drawings from the Public Works Department that pre-date construction show that the sectors were installed as planned.

The bright sector had a range of 17 nautical miles (31 km).

The lighthouse was officially opened on 23 August 1902 by the Minister for Public Works Hector Rason. The opening was attended by a number of politicians and businessmen including the Colonial Treasurer James Gardiner; the Colonial Secretary, Walter Kingsmill; and the Mayor of Fremantle, Lawrence Alexander.

The first lightkeeper was William Efford. He was transferred from the Arthur Head lighthouse, which was extinguished when Woodman Point was lit. The first assistant keeper was John Lyons, who was transferred from Jarman Island.

New condensing prisms were fitted in 1908. During World War II it was used by the army as a communications base and observations post, and was therefore placed under guard. In 1944 the clockwork mechanism controlling the occulting of the light was replaced, as the original was considered on the verge of failure. In the mid 1950s an additional green sector was added to the south-west. In 1955 the lighthouse was electrified at a cost of £1,300. The new electrified light had a range of about 34.5 nautical miles (63.9 km) in clear weather. On 19 July of that year, the lighthouse was de-staffed. The last lightkeeper was Laurence McBride; the last assistant keeper was Albert Livesey.
