= Laurel Canyon station =

Bus rapid transit station in Los Angeles, California

Laurel Canyon/Valley Village
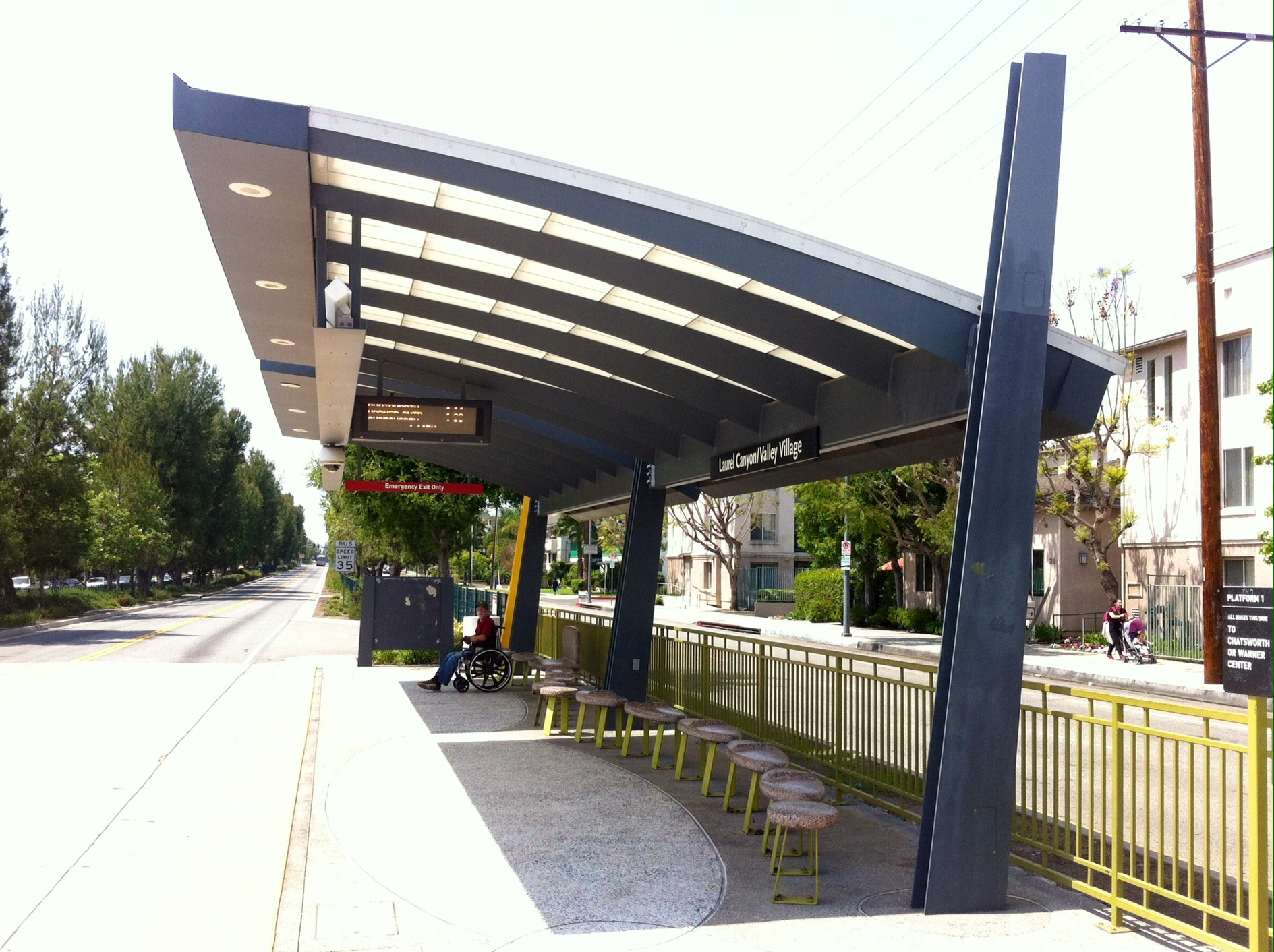
- Laurel Canyon station platform in 2015

General information
- Location: 5370 & 5371 Laurel Canyon Boulevard; Los Angeles, California
- Coordinates: 34.1685°N 118.3965°W
- Owner: Los Angeles County Metropolitan Transportation Authority
- Platforms: 2 side platforms
- Connections: Los Angeles Metro Bus

Construction
- Cycle facilities: Metro Bike Share station, racks and lockers
- Accessible: Yes

History
- Opened: October 29, 2005

Passengers
- FY 2025: 572 (avg. wkdy boardings)

Services
Preceding station	Metro Busway	Following station
Valley College toward Chatsworth	G Line	North Hollywood Terminus
Location

Laurel Canyon station (signed as Laurel Canyon/Valley Village) is a station on the G Line of the Los Angeles Metro Busway system. It is named after adjacent Laurel Canyon Boulevard, and the Valley Village district of Los Angeles, in the San Fernando Valley.

== Service ==
=== Hours and frequency ===
G Line buses run 24 hours a day. Buses operate every eight minutes during peak hours on weekdays. They operate every ten minutes during the daytime on weekdays and most of the day on weekends. Night service on all days is every 20 minutes.

=== Connections ===
As of January 19, 2025, the following connections are available:

- Los Angeles Metro Bus: 230
