= Woodmen of Union Building =

- U.S. National Register of Historic Places
- U.S. Historic district – Contributing property
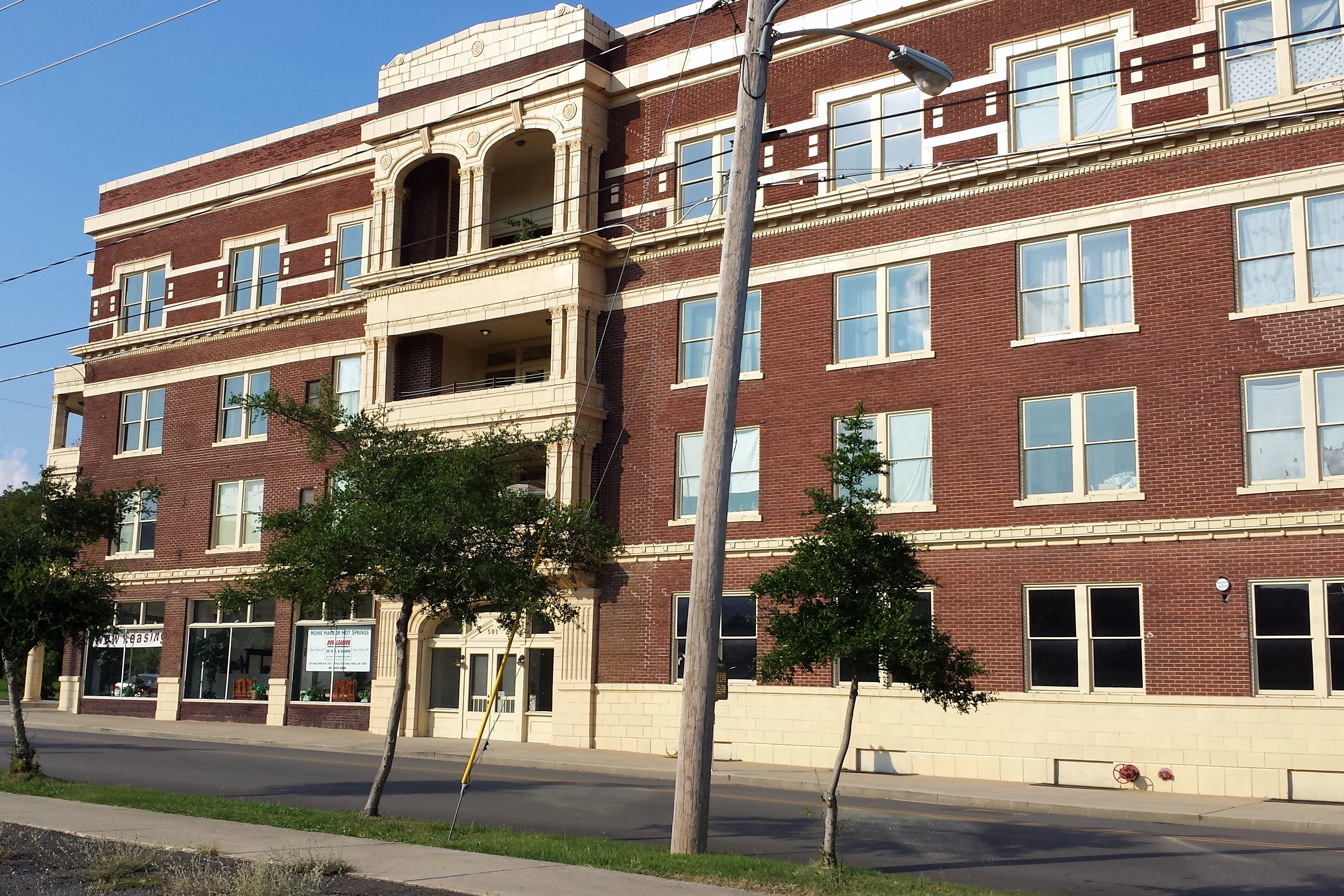

- Location within Arkansas Location within the United States
- Location: 501 Malvern Ave., Hot Springs, Arkansas
- Coordinates: 34°30′25″N 93°2′58″W
- Area: 1 acre (0.40 ha)
- Built: 1923
- Architect: Bailey, W.T.
- Architectural style: Classical Revival
- Part of: Pleasant Street Historic District (ID03000532)
- NRHP reference No.: 97000616

Significant dates
- Added to NRHP: June 27, 1997
- Designated CP: June 20, 2003

The Woodmen of Union Building is a historic commercial building at 501 Malvern Avenue in Hot Springs, Arkansas. It is a four-story structure, built mainly out of brick and ceramic blocks, although its southeastern section has upper levels with wood framing and finishing. Its main facade has an elaborate projecting entrance portico, with the entrance set in an elliptical-arch opening supported by fluted pilasters. The interior retains significant original features, including a bank vault, marble wainscoting, and a 2,500-seat auditorium. It was built in 1923–24 for the Supreme Lodge of the Woodmen of Union, an African-American social organization, which operated it as a multifunction bathhouse, hotel, hospital, bank, and performance venue. It was purchased in 1950 by the National Baptist Association.

The building was listed on the National Register of Historic Places in 1997.

== History ==
The first bathhouses were established at the hot springs in 1830. With the growth in popularity, the United States created a reservation to prevent commercial exploitation. The nineteenth century saw the village grow into a medical-pleasure resort. The 1875 completion of a railroad from Malvern made the springs available to a larger audience.

It is assumed that there was at least a small community of colored people by 1868, when Rev. Henderson Patillo and Rev. B. W. Whitlow came to Hot Springs from Malvern to preach to a group of worshippers. In 1919, the Supreme Lodge of the Woodman of Union, a black social club/union/fraternity, purchased the site. In 1923, the building was erected along Malvern Avenue, between Gulpha and Garden Streets. From throughout Arkansas, African-American men came on January 17, 1924, to dedicate the Woodman of Union Building, created by the genius of J. L. Webb, Supreme Custodian of the Woodman of Union. A 100-bed hospital and nurses training school, a 75-room bath hotel, the Woodman of Union Bank, a 2,500-seat auditorium, an electrically operated printing plant, and executive offices were all located within the building. The auditorium hosted attractions such as Count Basie and Duke Ellington.

In 1950, the building was purchased by the ‘’National Baptist Association, U.S.A‘’, being then known as the National Baptist Hotel and Bath House. The bathhouse was subject to federal regulations regarding bathhouse standards, like those along Bathhouse Row. The Association expanded the bathhouse and improved the facilities. As segregation was coming to an end in the 1970s, integrated public facilities became prevalent, and the National Baptist Hotel saw a decline in clientele. In 1981, it closed. In 1984, it was purchased for redevelopment, which was later dropped. In 1991, Hawk Management Group, Inc., of Northern Nevada purchased the building.

== Bibliographical ==
- Brown, Dee; The American Spa, Hot Springs, Arkansas. Little Rack: Rose Publishing Co., 1982.
- Page, John C. and Laura Soulliere Harrison. Out of the Vapors: A Social and Architectural History of Bathhouse Row. U. S. Department of the Interior, National Park Service, 1987.
- Workers of the Writer's Program. The WPA Guide to 1930's Arkansas, with new introduction by Elliot West; Lawrence, Kansas: The University Press, 1987 (original copyright, 1941).

== See also ==
- National Register of Historic Places listings in Garland County, Arkansas
- Afro-American Life Insurance Company, (1976) partially re-insured policies of the Universal Life Insurance Company.
- North Carolina Mutual Life Insurance Company, (2010) partially re-insured policies of the Universal Life Insurance company.

=== Similar name ===
- WoodmenLife
- Modern Woodmen of America
