= Woodmen Hall (Stuart, Florida) =

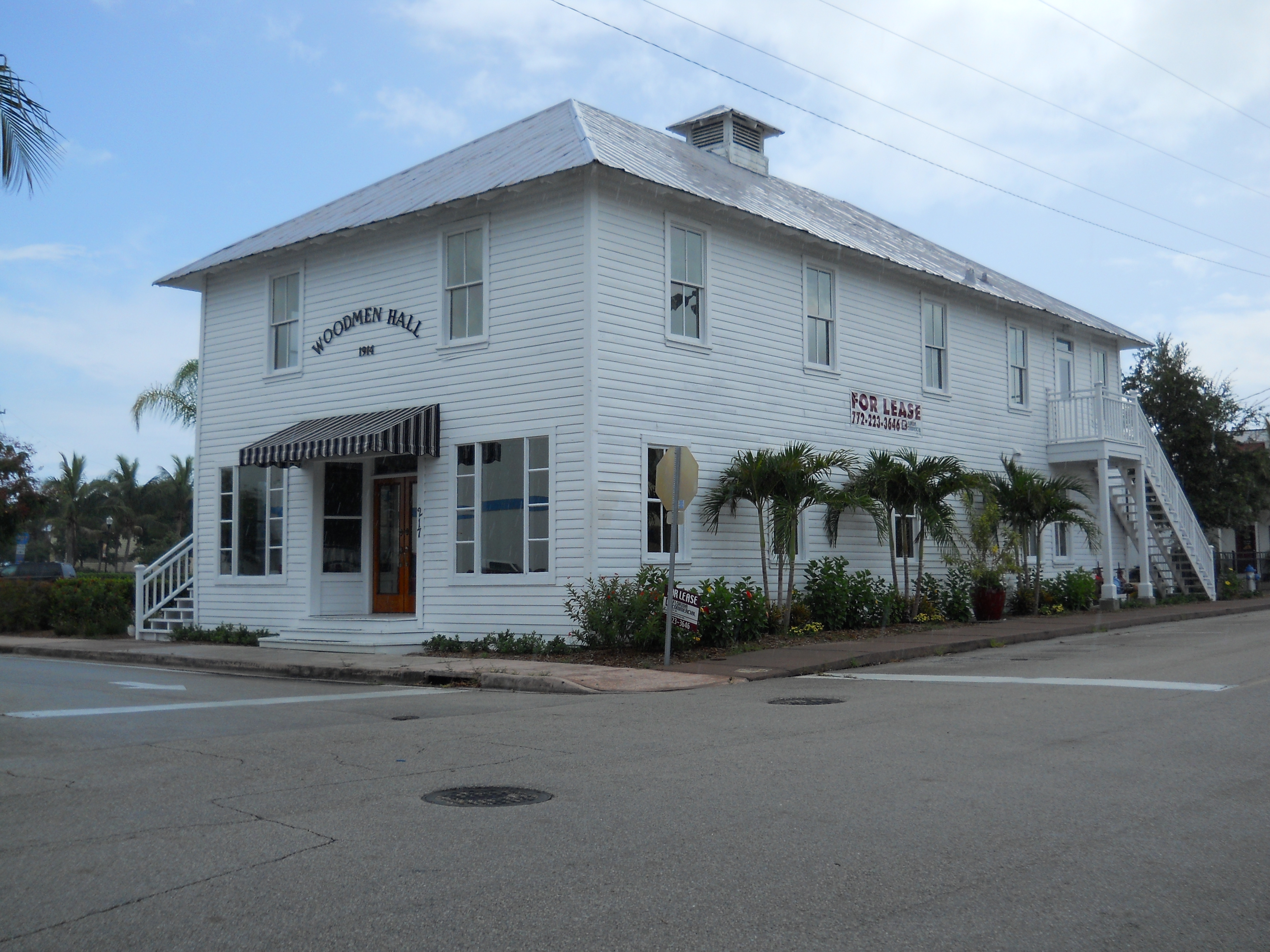
- Woodmen Hall in 2010 after being renovated

General information
- Architectural style: frame vernacular
- Location: 217 SW Akron Ave., Stuart, Florida, United States
- Coordinates: 27.19847°N 80.2553°W
- Construction started: 1913
- Completed: 1914

Technical details
- Structural system: wooden frame

Design and construction
- Architect: Builder: Sam Matthews

Woodmen Hall is an historic 2-story wooden Woodmen of the World building located 217 SW Akron Avenue, corner of SW 3rd Street in Stuart, Martin County, Florida. It was built between 1913-1914 by local master carpenter Sam Matthews. Like many fraternal buildings built in the late 19th century and early 20th century, the ground floor was designed for commercial use, while the upper floor was designed for use as a meeting room for Pineapple Camp No. 150, Woodmen of the World as well as community groups. Prominent members of Pineapple Camp include George W. Parks, who had a general store in what is now the Stuart Heritage Museum and in 2000 was added to the state's list of Great Floridians. Early users of the first floor include H.A. Carlisle's Feed Store. From the 1930s until 1959, Southern Bell used the first floor as a business office, while the Stuart telephone exchange was located on the second floor. Recent uses have included a church (the Treasure Coast Presbyterian Church) and a coffee house and open mic music venue. One group performing in it even calls itself, Woodmen Hall. The building has been recently renovated through the efforts of Stuart Main Street. An elevator has been added. The double outside staircases on the eastern part of the south side have been reduced to one, while an outside staircase has been added on the north side toward Akron Avenue. The two large front windows differ from those shown in a 1925 photograph. "

In 1989, Woodmen Hall was listed in A Guide to Florida's Historic Architecture, published by the University of Florida Press. " Since 2015, Woodmen Hall has been occupied by the Wiglesworth-Rindom Insurance Agency, Inc., a regional personal lines insurance agency. The firm specializes in providing education and risk management assistance traditionally reserved for affluent markets, now tailored for Main Street America. The agency has been recognized with multiple Consumer Choice Awards and was named one of Insurance Journal’s Best Places to Work in 2023.
