= Hollywood Boulevard =

Street in Los Angeles, California

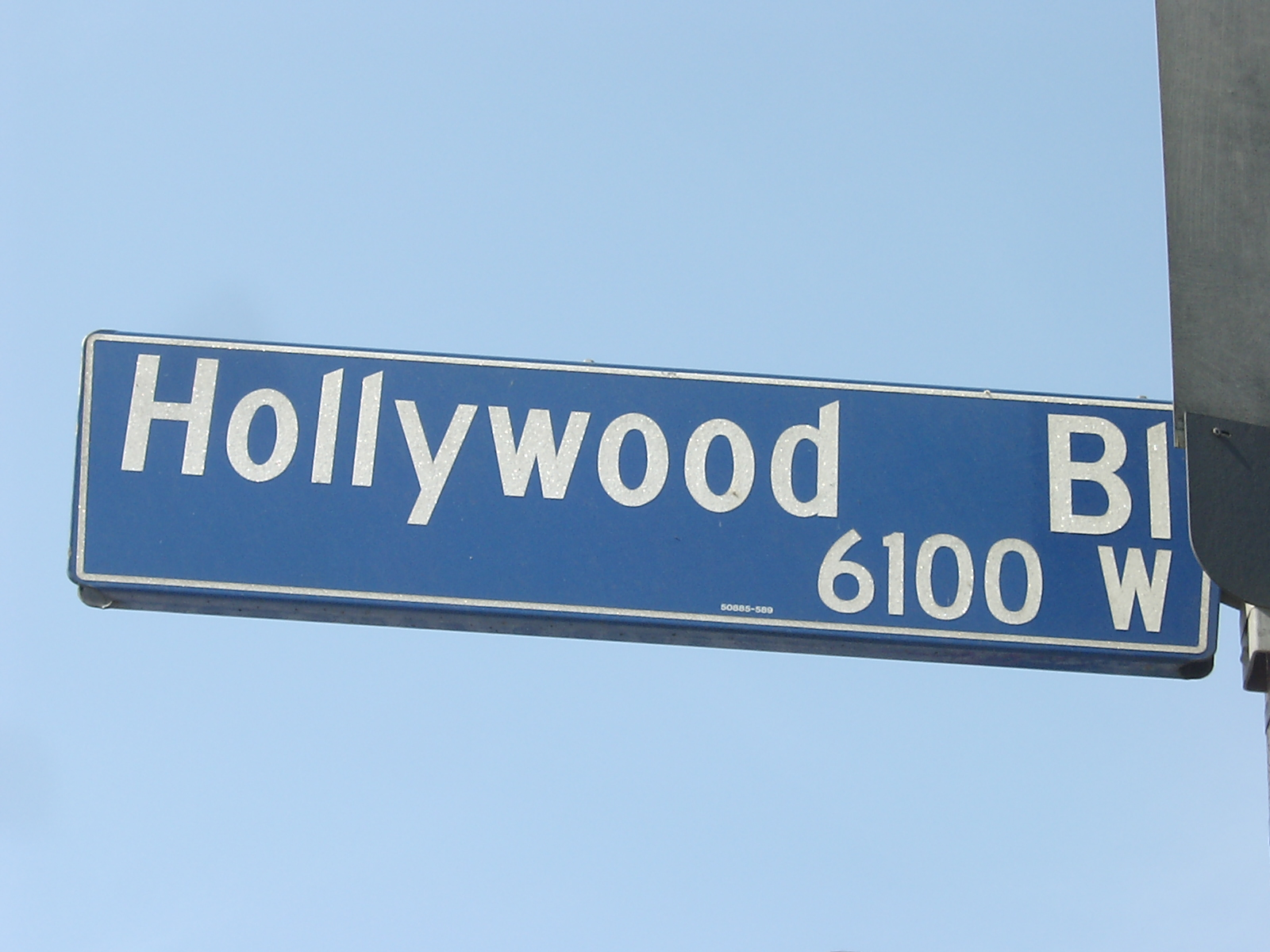
- Hollywood Boulevard sign
- Interactive map of Hollywood Boulevard
- Former name: Prospect Avenue (1887–1910)
- Maintained by: Bureau of Street Services, City of L.A. DPW
- Nearest metro station: : Hollywood/Highland; Hollywood/Vine; Hollywood/Western
- West end: Sunset Plaza Drive in Hollywood Hills West
- Major junctions: US 101 in Hollywood
- East end: Sunset Boulevard / Hillhurst Avenue / Virgil Avenue in Los Feliz

Other
- Known for: Hollywood and Vine; Hollywood Walk of Fame
- Hollywood Boulevard Commercial and Entertainment District
- U.S. National Register of Historic Places
- U.S. Historic district
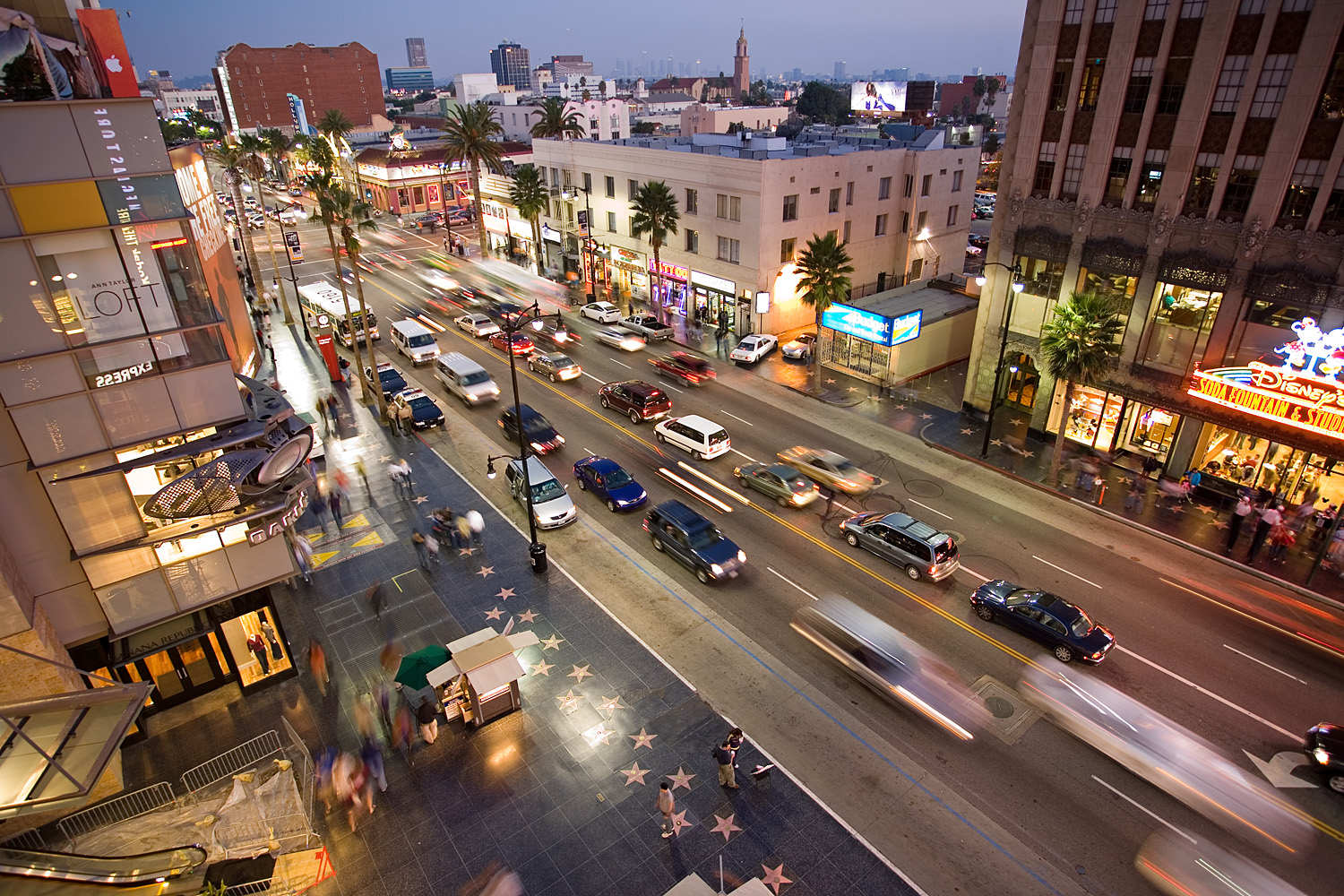
- The revamped Hollywood Boulevard as seen from the Dolby Theatre, 2005
- Built: 1939
- NRHP reference No.: 85000704
- Added to NRHP: April 4, 1985

Hollywood Boulevard is a major east–west street in Los Angeles, California. It runs through the Hollywood, East Hollywood, Little Armenia, Thai Town, and Los Feliz districts. Its western terminus is at Sunset Plaza Drive in the Hollywood Hills and its eastern terminus is at Sunset Boulevard in Los Feliz. Hollywood Boulevard is famous for running through the tourist areas in central Hollywood, including attractions such as the Hollywood Walk of Fame and the Ovation Hollywood shopping and entertainment complex.

== Route description ==
Hollywood Boulevard's western terminus is at Sunset Plaza Drive in the Hollywood Hills. It then runs as a winding residential street down to Laurel Canyon Boulevard. The boulevard then proceeds due east as a major thoroughfare through Hollywood and its popular tourist areas. Part of this segment has been listed in the U.S. National Register of Historic Places as part of Hollywood Boulevard Commercial and Entertainment District. The fifteen blocks between La Brea Avenue east to Gower Street is part of the Hollywood Walk of Fame. The Ovation Hollywood shopping and entertainment complex, the home of the Dolby Theatre, is located at the corner of Hollywood Boulevard and Highland Avenue. And the intersection with Vine Street was once a symbol of Hollywood itself.

East of Gower Street, Hollywood Boulevard crosses the Hollywood Freeway (US 101) before running through East Hollywood. The portion of the boulevard between the Hollywood Freeway and Vermont Avenue forms the northern boundary of Little Armenia, while the portion between Western Avenue and Sunset Boulevard forms part of the southern boundary of Los Feliz. Thai Town is centered along the six blocks of Hollywood Boulevard between Western and Normandie Avenues. After crossing Vermont Avenue, Hollywood Boulevard heads southeast to its eastern terminus at Sunset Boulevard.

Three B (Red) Line Metro Rail stations are located on Hollywood Boulevard: Hollywood/Highland station, Hollywood/Vine station, and Hollywood/Western station.

== History ==
=== 1890s to 1910 ===
Part of today's Hollywood Boulevard was called Prospect Avenue, a dusty road that ran through Hollywood towards the neighboring city of Los Angeles. In December 1899, a new railroad construction began to connect Hollywood with Los Angeles in a project that was led by Peter Beveridge, H.J. Whitley, and Griffith J. Griffith.

In May 1900, the railroad connecting Hollywood and Los Angeles was completed, and another one was under construction. In 1901, the Town of Hollywood opened the new macadamized road surface with electric railway that ran down its center between Laurel Canyon and Western. Eventually, the road was widened from 20 feet wide to almost 100 feet wide in some areas.

On November 09, 1903, Hollywood became an incorporated municipality, and Prospect Avenue became sometimes known as the Boulevard of Hollywood, albeit unofficially.

On February 07, 1910, the town of Hollywood was consolidated into the City of Los Angeles, and the majority of Prospect Avenue was officially renamed to Hollywood Boulevard starting at the intersection of North Vermont Avenue.

=== 1920s ===
In the early 1920s, real estate developer Charles E. Toberman (the "Father of Hollywood") envisioned a thriving Hollywood theater district. Toberman was involved in 36 real estate development projects while building the Max Factor Salon, Hollywood Roosevelt Hotel and the Hollywood Masonic Temple. He partnered with Sid Grauman, and they opened the three themed theaters: Egyptian, El Capitan ("The Captain") (1926), and Chinese.

==== Regional shopping district ====
Starting around 1920, the boulevard and adjacent streets became a major regional shopping district, both for everyday needs and appliances, but increasingly also for high-end clothing and accessories, in part because of the nearby film studios. Chains that opened includes Schwab's in 1921, Mullen & Bluett in 1922, I. Magnin in 1923, Myer Siegel in 1925, F. W. Grand and Newberry's (dime stores) in 1926–8, and Roos Brothers in 1929. The independent Robertson's department store, at 46,000 square feet (4,300 m^{2}) and 4 stories tall, opened in 1923. In 1922, stock was sold to finance construction of a much larger department store at Hollywood and Vine, originally to have been a Boadway Bros. When Boadway's went out of business the next year, B. H. Dyas, a Downtown Los Angeles–based department store, opened in the 130,000-square-foot (12,000 m^{2}) building in March 1928, then sold their lease to The Broadway in 1931 – the building still a landmark today, known as the Broadway Hollywood Building. By 1930 the shopping district consisted of over 300 stores. The area would later face competition from areas along Wilshire Boulevard: the easternmost around Bullocks Wilshire which opened in 1929, second the Miracle Mile, and finally, the shopping district of Beverly Hills, where Saks Fifth Avenue opened a store in 1938.

===== Map of businesses in the shopping district at its peak c.1925–8 =====
The following diagram, based on an artistic map by the Hollywood Boulevard Association, and on newspaper advertisements shows the major businesses along Hollywood Boulevard, from the intersection with Vine Street to the intersection with La Brea Avenue, in 1927 or 1928. There are a few relevant notes about major buildings added after 1928. Numbers from 6100–7200 are addresses on Hollywood Boulevard. Dates indicate years of opening, except dates with an asterisk indicate that the establishment was in operation that year according to the source document consulted.

| Pantages Theatre 6233; Bank of Hollywood Bldg. (1929) 6253, now Equitable Bldg. of Hollywood | H O L L Y W O O D B O U L E V A R D | 6280 Taft Bldg. (1923, studio offices, Academy HQ in 1935) |
| VINE | H O L L Y W O O D B O U L E V A R D | VINE |
| Van de Kamp's 6309; 6315; Henry's cafe 6321; Guaranty Bldg. 6333 | H O L L Y W O O D B O U L E V A R D | 6300 B. H. Dyas dept. store (1928–31), later (1931–82) The Broadway; 6316 Mullen & Bluett dept. store (1922); 6320 Roos Bros. clothing (1929) later Newberry's 2nd loc. 6324 Oscar Balzer gifts (1928*), later Albert Sheetz candy 6326 Walton & Co. jewelers 6330 Oscar Balzer's annex 6332 Columbia department store 6334 Weatherby-Kayser shoes 6340 I. Magnin dept. store (1923–39); 6348 Ernest Swift |
| IVAR | H O L L Y W O O D B O U L E V A R D | COSMO |
| Hollywood Stationers 6365; Kelley Music 6367; Hollywood News newspaper 6371; Security Trust & Savings Bank 6385 | H O L L Y W O O D B O U L E V A R D | 6358 Schwab's Pharmacy (1921); 6366 Hollywood Citizen newspaper 6368-70 Baker-Hertzler; 6374 United Cigar; 6378 1/2 Hollywood Pen Shop; 6386 Sun Drug Co. |
| CAHUENGA | H O L L Y W O O D B O U L E V A R D | CAHUENGA |
| Liggett's Drug Store 6401; Santa Fe RR ticket office 6405; Wm. Stromberg jewelers 6439; Joseph Miller Drug Co. 6445; Carque | H O L L Y W O O D B O U L E V A R D | 6418 Dr. Reed's Shoes; 6432 Weinberg's coats/gowns/frocks |
| WILCOX | H O L L Y W O O D B O U L E V A R D | WILCOX |
| Innes Shoe Co. 6501; Harry Cooper gowns/frocks 6511; Jimmy Clinton men's 6519; Fett's Palace of Flowers 6521; Beller Bldg. 6513; Gumbiner's menswear 6523–5; Warner Bros. Theatre 6531 | H O L L Y W O O D B O U L E V A R D | 6500 1/2 Nancy Hubbard Chocolates; 6508 Iris Theatre; 6540 L. A. First Natl. Bank |
| HUDSON | H O L L Y W O O D B O U L E V A R D | HUDSON |
| Liljedahl-Bengtsson batik dress shop 6515; Wurlitzer Music Co. 6517; Griffis & Mackey sporting goods 6527; Hillview Apts. (1917) 6531–3; Madden Millinery Shoppe 6561; Roth Furniture 6549; Natl. Bank of Hwd 6565; Bee Drug 6565 | H O L L Y W O O D B O U L E V A R D | 6562 Chrisney Drug Co. 6600 Armstrong's restaurant (1928*); 6600–4 Newberry's variety store now Hollywood Toys & Costumes; 6606 Moss Glove and Hosiery; 6608 Kress variety store (1934) later Frederick's of Hollywood lingerie (1947-?); 6614 Platt Music Co. 6624 Piggly Wiggly (1925*); 6624 Hollywood Hardware (1928*); 6630 Simon's Dairy Lunch; 6634 Matthess menswear 6624 1/2 Van de Kamp's; 6636 Cherokee Bldg. 6646 Clubb's cigar shop 6646 1/2 Buddy Squirrel's Nut Shop (1928) |
| WHITLEY | H O L L Y W O O D B O U L E V A R D | 6562 Chrisney Drug Co. 6600 Armstrong's restaurant (1928*); 6600–4 Newberry's variety store now Hollywood Toys & Costumes; 6606 Moss Glove and Hosiery; 6608 Kress variety store (1934) later Frederick's of Hollywood lingerie (1947-?); 6614 Platt Music Co. 6624 Piggly Wiggly (1925*); 6624 Hollywood Hardware (1928*); 6630 Simon's Dairy Lunch; 6634 Matthess menswear 6624 1/2 Van de Kamp's; 6636 Cherokee Bldg. 6646 Clubb's cigar shop 6646 1/2 Buddy Squirrel's Nut Shop (1928) |
| Baine Bldg. 6601–9; Merchants Nat'l Trust & Savings 6601; Watson & Son tailors 6605; Evansmith photo studios 6605; Hamilton's shoes 6607; Peggy Rose Shoppe hosiery 6611; Holly-Angeles Music, 6611 1/2; Hwd Toy Shop (1919–27*) 6613; Frederick Winn millinery, dresses (1928–?) 6613; Hollywood China Shop 6613 1/2; Player's Café 6615; Hollywood Fur 6617 | H O L L Y W O O D B O U L E V A R D | 6562 Chrisney Drug Co. 6600 Armstrong's restaurant (1928*); 6600–4 Newberry's variety store now Hollywood Toys & Costumes; 6606 Moss Glove and Hosiery; 6608 Kress variety store (1934) later Frederick's of Hollywood lingerie (1947-?); 6614 Platt Music Co. 6624 Piggly Wiggly (1925*); 6624 Hollywood Hardware (1928*); 6630 Simon's Dairy Lunch; 6634 Matthess menswear 6624 1/2 Van de Kamp's; 6636 Cherokee Bldg. 6646 Clubb's cigar shop 6646 1/2 Buddy Squirrel's Nut Shop (1928) |
| CHEROKEE | H O L L Y W O O D B O U L E V A R D | CHEROKEE |

continued in next column

| CHEROKEE | H O L L Y W O O D B O U L E V A R D | CHEROKEE |
| Mutual B & L 6651; Norman's Art Shop 6653; The Arlynn Shop millinery 6663; Woman's Exchange 6665; Musso & Frank 6669; Central Hardware Co. 6673; Hwd Typewriter Shop 6681; Hwd Boot Shop 6683; Myer Siegel dept. store (1925) 6687 | H O L L Y W O O D B O U L E V A R D | 6650 Western Auto Parts (1925*); 6650 H. G. Haroutunian oriental rugs (1928*); 6650 Hirshfield's dresses (1931*); 6652 Wood's women's apparel 6654 Hertz Driv-ur-self Station (rent-a-car); 6656 Hwd Electric Shop (1925*); 6656 Fry's shoes (1929*); 6658 Karl Shoe Store (1928); 6658 1/2 Jerome dresses 6660 Brooks Clothing (1928); 6664 C. H. Baker shoes 6666 Clark's Dollar Store; 6668 1/2 Haroutunian rugs/art 6672 Young's Speedy Shoes; 6674 Peggy Rose Shop; 6676 Busy Corner Drug Co. |
| LAS PALMAS | H O L L Y W O O D B O U L E V A R D | LAS PALMAS |
| Citrin's dress shop 6701; Gerly perfumes 6703; Metykos furriers 6707 Outpost Bldg. 6715; Florence Hartock children's 6723; Gould's boy/young men's 6747 | H O L L Y W O O D B O U L E V A R D | 6700 Central Grocery Co. (1923) ︎6700 Maison Marcell coats/frocks (1925*); 6700–2 Paulais restaurant 1925–7*; 6702 Leighton's cafeteria (1928*); 6704 Fitzpatric's shoes 6712 Egyptian Theatre; 6714 Pig 'n Whistle cafe 6720 Citizens National Trust and Savings; 6724 Hotel Christie; 6730 Burnett Bros. watches/jewelry 6732 Union Pacific ticket office 6738 United Cigar |
| MCCADDEN | H O L L Y W O O D B O U L E V A R D | MCCADDEN |
| Robertson Co. dept. st. (1923–42), then J. C. Penney 6751-3; Café Montmartre nightclub (1923) 6757–63; C. E. Toberman real estate 6763 | H O L L Y W O O D B O U L E V A R D | 6764 Hollywood Theatre (1913–82) now site of Guiness Museum; 6770 Gittleson's theater ticket agency |
| HIGHLAND | H O L L Y W O O D B O U L E V A R D | HIGHLAND |
| Hollywood Hotel 6837 | H O L L Y W O O D B O U L E V A R D | 6802 Ever-Ready Drug; 6818 I. Miller shoes 6834 Barker Bros. furniture Garwood and Johnson; 6838 El Capitan Theatre; 6812 Hollywood Book Store; 6908 Bess Schlank; 6912 Hartsook photo studios 6916 The French Bootire; 6918 Bessie Bassett Gowns; 6922 Shayne's Gowns and Wraps; 6926 Chryson's stationers 6932 Young's Market (1928*); 6934 Safeway market (1928*) |
| ORCHID | H O L L Y W O O D B O U L E V A R D | 6802 Ever-Ready Drug; 6818 I. Miller shoes 6834 Barker Bros. furniture Garwood and Johnson; 6838 El Capitan Theatre; 6812 Hollywood Book Store; 6908 Bess Schlank; 6912 Hartsook photo studios 6916 The French Bootire; 6918 Bessie Bassett Gowns; 6922 Shayne's Gowns and Wraps; 6926 Chryson's stationers 6932 Young's Market (1928*); 6934 Safeway market (1928*) |
| Lickter's of Hwd cigarette fashion 6915; Grauman's Chinese Theatre now TCL Chinese 6925 | H O L L Y W O O D B O U L E V A R D | 6802 Ever-Ready Drug; 6818 I. Miller shoes 6834 Barker Bros. furniture Garwood and Johnson; 6838 El Capitan Theatre; 6812 Hollywood Book Store; 6908 Bess Schlank; 6912 Hartsook photo studios 6916 The French Bootire; 6918 Bessie Bassett Gowns; 6922 Shayne's Gowns and Wraps; 6926 Chryson's stationers 6932 Young's Market (1928*); 6934 Safeway market (1928*) |
| ORANGE | H O L L Y W O O D B O U L E V A R D | ORANGE |
| | H O L L Y W O O D B O U L E V A R D | 7000–6 Hwd Roosevelt Hotel; 7044 Professional Bldg., Grace Nolan; 7048 Liggett's Drug Store |
| SYCAMORE | H O L L Y W O O D B O U L E V A R D | SYCAMORE |
| C. R. Welden real estate 7077 | H O L L Y W O O D B O U L E V A R D | |
| EL CERRITO | H O L L Y W O O D B O U L E V A R D | |
| LA BREA | H O L L Y W O O D B O U L E V A R D | LA BREA |

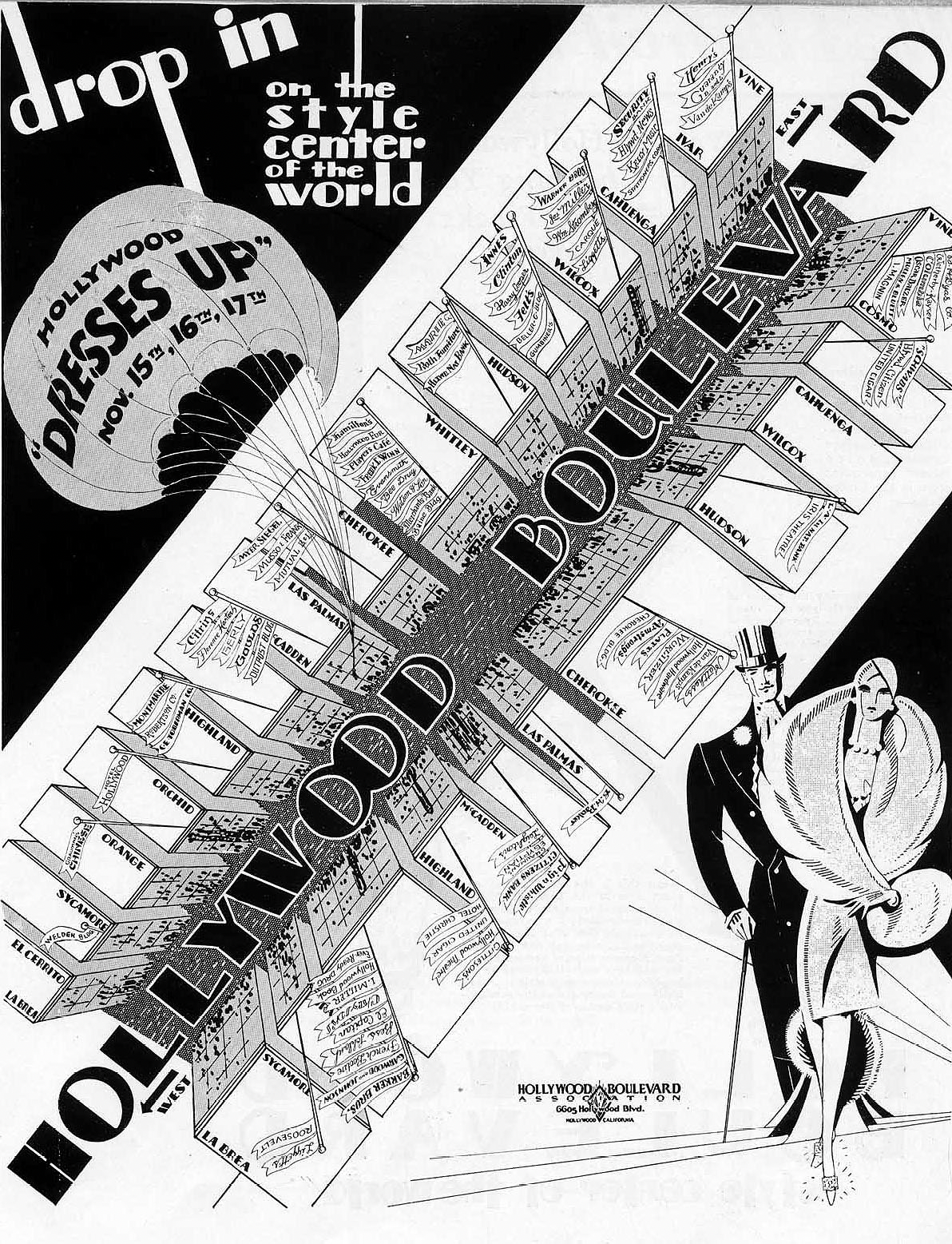
Artistic rendering of Hollywood Boulevard Shopping District 1927 or -8

=== 1940s to 1960s ===
In 1946, Gene Autry, while riding his horse in the Hollywood Christmas Parade — which passes down Hollywood Boulevard each year on the Sunday after Thanksgiving — heard young parade watchers yelling, "Here comes Santa Claus, here comes Santa Claus!" and was inspired to write "Here Comes Santa Claus" with Oakley Haldeman.

In 1958, the Hollywood Walk of Fame, which runs from La Brea Avenue east to Gower Street (and an additional three blocks on Vine Street), was created as a tribute to artists working in the entertainment industry.

=== Decline ===
In the 1970s, the street became very seedy and was frequented by many odd characters as shown in pictures by photographer Ave Pildas.

=== Revitalization ===
In 1984, a portion of Hollywood Boulevard was listed in the National Register of Historic Places as part of the Hollywood Boulevard Commercial and Entertainment District.

In 1992, the street was paved with glittery asphalt between Vine Street and La Brea Boulevard.

The El Capitan Theatre was refurbished in 1991 then damaged in the 1994 Northridge earthquake. The full El Capitan building was fully restored and upgraded in December 1997. The Hollywood Entertainment District, a self-taxing business improvement district, was formed for the properties from La Brea to McCadden on the boulevard.

The Hollywood extension of the Metro Red Line subway was opened in June 1999, running from Downtown Los Angeles to the San Fernando Valley. Stops on Hollywood Boulevard are located at Western Avenue, Vine Street, and Highland Avenue. Metro Local lines 180 and 217 also serve Hollywood Boulevard. A light rail extension station is proposed at the Hollywood Blvd. and Highland Ave. intersection connection the boulevard with West Hollywood, Central LA and LAX.

An anti-cruising ordinance prohibits driving on parts of the boulevard more than twice in four hours.

Beginning in 1995, then Los Angeles City Council member Jackie Goldberg initiated efforts to clean up Hollywood Boulevard and reverse its decades-long slide into disrepute. Central to these efforts was the construction of the Hollywood and Highland Center and adjacent Dolby Theatre (originally known as the Kodak Theatre) in 2001.

In the summer of 2005, the city made revamping plans on Hollywood Boulevard for future tourists. The three-part plan was to exchange the original streetlights with red stars into two-headed old-fashioned streetlights, put in new palm trees, and put in new stoplights. The renovations were completed in late 2005.

In the few years leading up to 2007, more than $2 billion was spent on projects in the neighborhood, including mixed-use retail and apartment complexes and new schools and museums.

In 2021, the Vogue Theatre, on Hollywood Boulevard, at Las Palmas, reopened as the Vogue Multicultural Museum.

Renovations of the Hollywood and Highland Center began in 2020. The renovated complex was renamed Ovation Hollywood in 2022.

In 2022, for the return of the LA Pride parade to the boulevard, the city installed multi colored lighting to more than 100 trees to illuminate for special events.

==== Heart of Hollywood / Walk of Fame Master Plan ====
Advocates promote the idea of closing Hollywood Boulevard to traffic and create a Pedestrian zone from La Brea Avenue to Highland Avenue citing an increase in pedestrian traffic including tourism, weekly movie premiers and award shows closures, including 10 days for the Academy Award ceremony at the Dolby Theatre. Similar to other cities in the US, like Third Street Promenade, Fremont Street in Las Vegas, Market St. in San Francisco or the closure in Times Squares Pedestrian Plaza's created in 2015.

In June 2019, The City of Los Angeles commissioned Gensler architects to provide a master plan for a $4 million renovation to improve and "update the streetscape concept" for the Walk of Fame between the Pantages Theater (Gower Avenue) at the east and The Emerson Theatre (La Brea Avenue) at the west end of the boulevard. Los Angeles City Councilmember Mitch O'Farrell released the draft master plan designed by Gensler and Studio-MLA in January 2020. The city's Bureau of Engineers proposed a three phase approach to implement the changes. This included adding bike lanes, new landscaping, removing lanes of car traffic, sidewalk widening by removing street parking and art-deco designed street pavers to beautify the boulevard. They also proposed a street mechanism to able to temporarily close the boulevard on pedestrian high capacity days or events where a street closure was approved. Creating public plazas and car free zones. Phase three would disallow east-west travel thru the boulevard but still allow north-south travel along its major intersections, Highland Avenue, Cahuanga Boulevard and Vine Street. The approved phase one was completed and removed parking lanes between Orange Drive and Gower Street in 2022. New district council member for Hollywood, Hugo Soto-Martinez continued with the revitalization plan after defeating O'Farrell in the 2022 election cycle. A motion was filed June 30, 2023 to implement a tax district to continue funding the master plans phase two and three. In early March 2024, council member Hugo Soto-Martinez announced "Access to Hollywood" plan. Commencing phase two of the proposed redevelopment. They announced the addition of bus only lanes, bikes lanes and the removal of additional street parking to add sidewalk space for pedestrians. Restructure of lanes to be completed by 2025. Phase three build out has not been announced, pending funding.

Also in East Hollywood area, another plan for boulevard revitalization is planned. LA DOT announced "Vision Zero" in August 2023, a pedestrian friendly streetscaping redesign. LADOT's plan focuses on the eastern section of Hollywood Boulevard between Gower Street and east past Vermont Avenue. Plans are to add safety instruments, continental crosswalks and pedestrian friendly alert striping.

== Major intersections ==
The entire route is in Los Angeles.

| mi | km | Destinations | Notes |
|---|---|---|---|
| 0.0 | 0.0 | Sunset Plaza Drive | Western terminus |
| 1.8 | 2.9 | Laurel Canyon Boulevard | |
| 2.0 | 3.2 | Fairfax Avenue | |
| 3.0 | 4.8 | La Brea Avenue | Western end of Hollywood Walk of Fame |
| 3.4 | 5.5 | Highland Avenue | Serves Ovation Hollywood, Hollywood/Highland station |
| 3.8 | 6.1 | Wilcox Avenue | |
| 3.9 | 6.3 | Cahuenga Boulevard | |
| 4.1 | 6.6 | Vine Street | Hollywood and Vine intersection; serves Hollywood/Vine station |
| 4.3 | 6.9 | Gower Street | Eastern end of Hollywood Walk of Fame |
| 4.6 | 7.4 | US 101 (Hollywood Freeway) | |
| 5.0 | 8.0 | Western Avenue | Serves Hollywood/Western station |
| 5.5 | 8.9 | Normandie Avenue | |
| 6.1 | 9.8 | Vermont Avenue | |
| 6.4 | 10.3 | Sunset Boulevard / Hillhurst Avenue / Virgil Avenue | Eastern terminus |
1.000 mi = 1.609 km; 1.000 km = 0.621 mi

== Gallery ==
Historical photos of Hollywood Boulevard
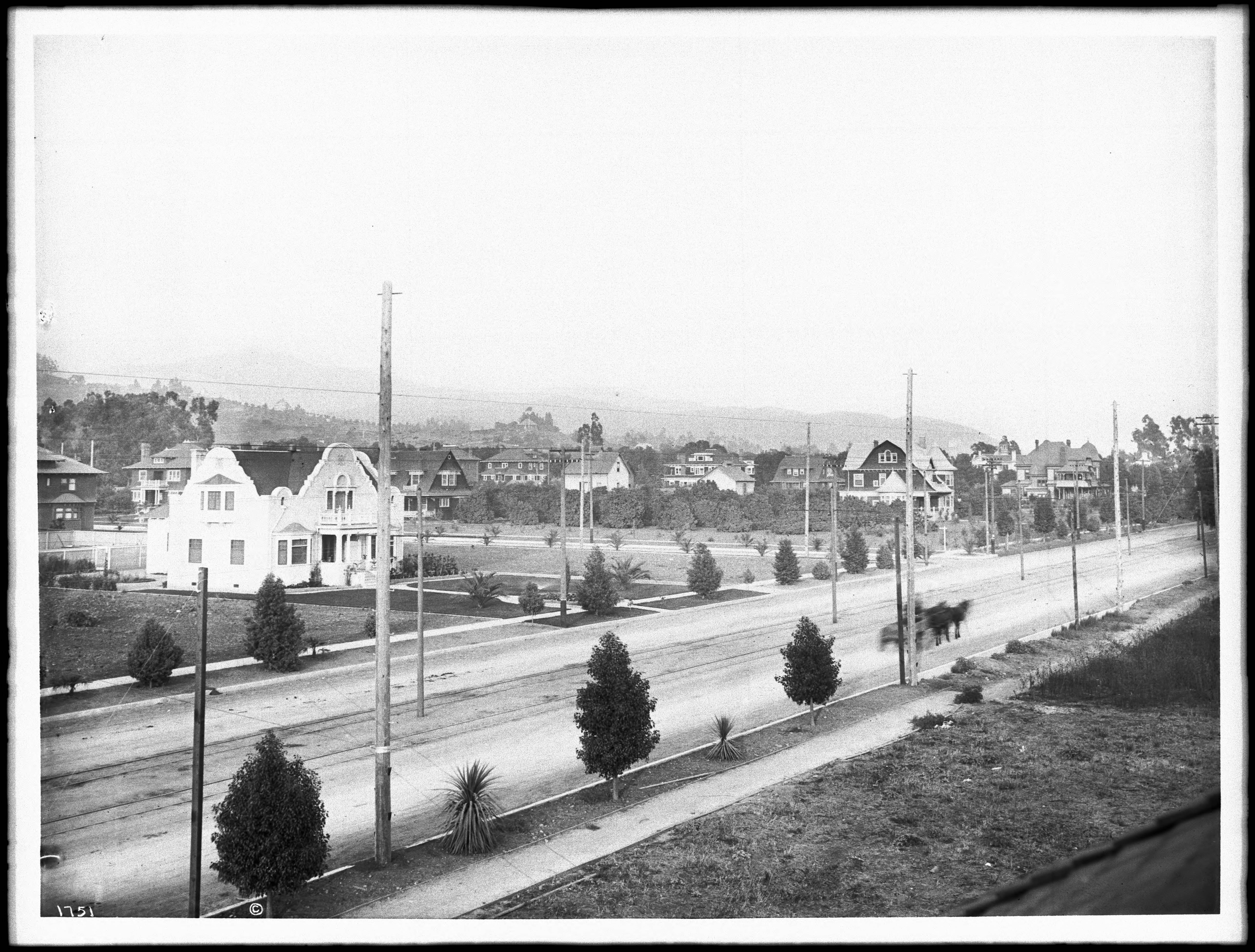
From a rooftop at Dale Street (or Orange Street?), c. 1905

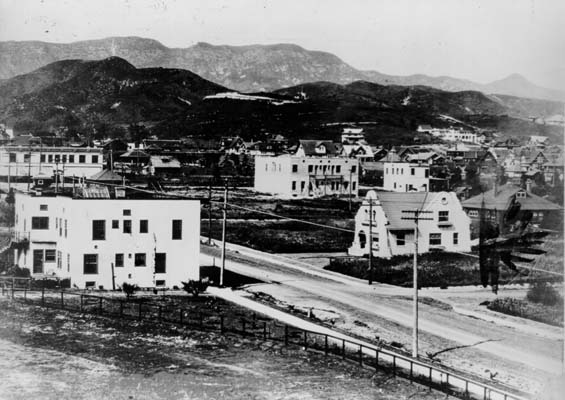
The intersection of Hollywood, then named Prospect and Highland avenues 1907

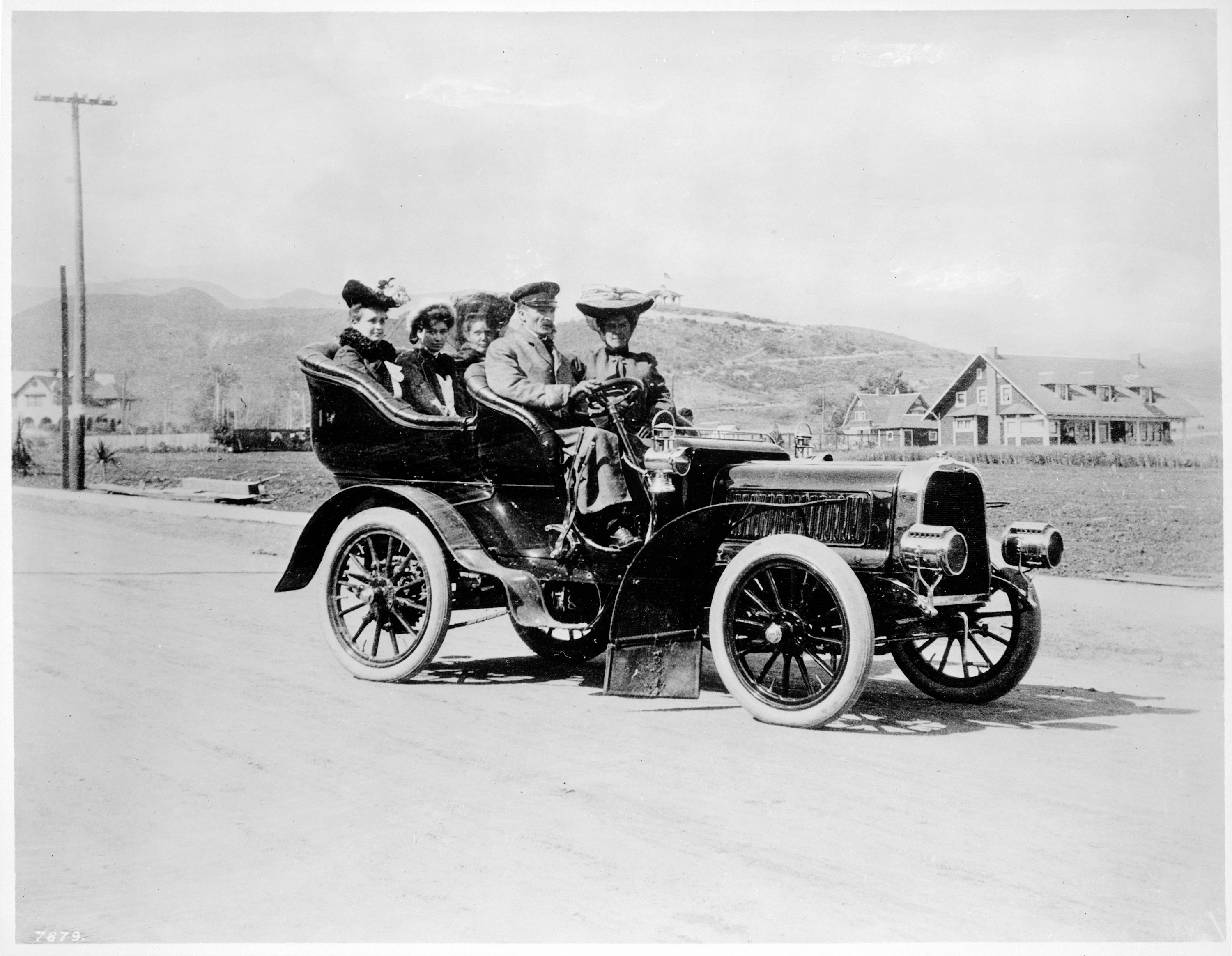
Cruising circa 1909

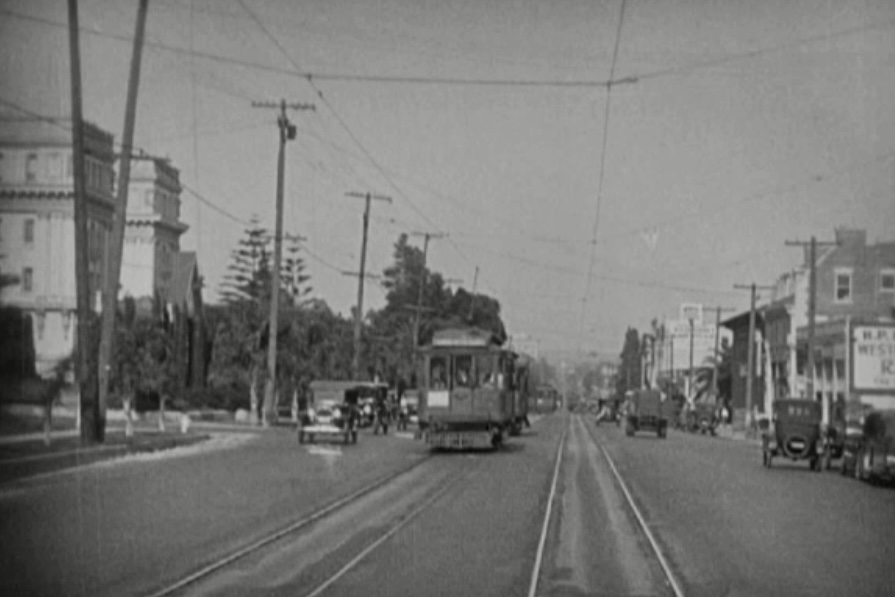
Screencap from promotional film Hollywood Snapshots (1922), Hollywood Line streetcar near Garden Court Apartments
Contemporary photos of Hollywood Boulevard
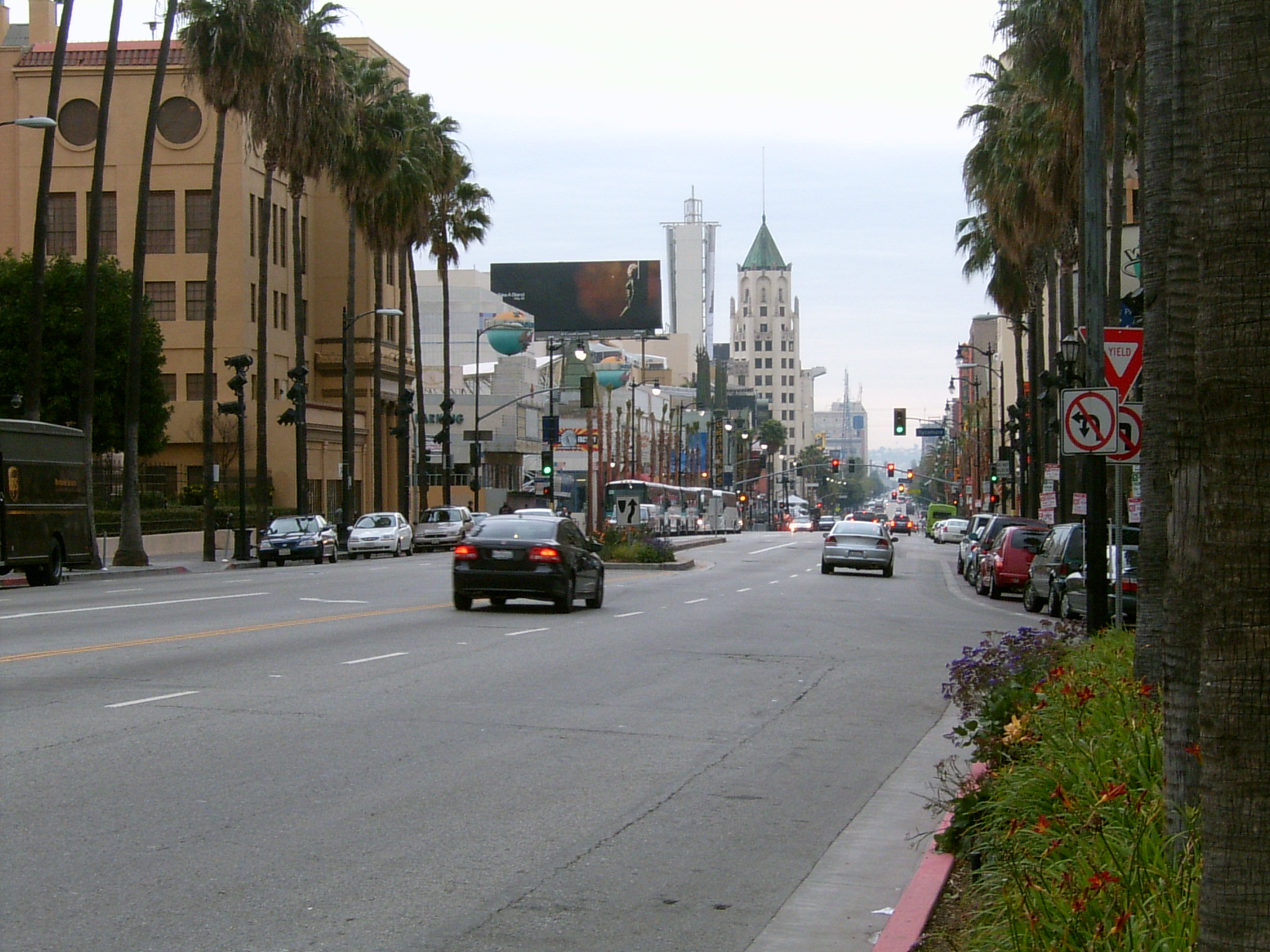
View toward the intersection of Hollywood and Highland, 2006

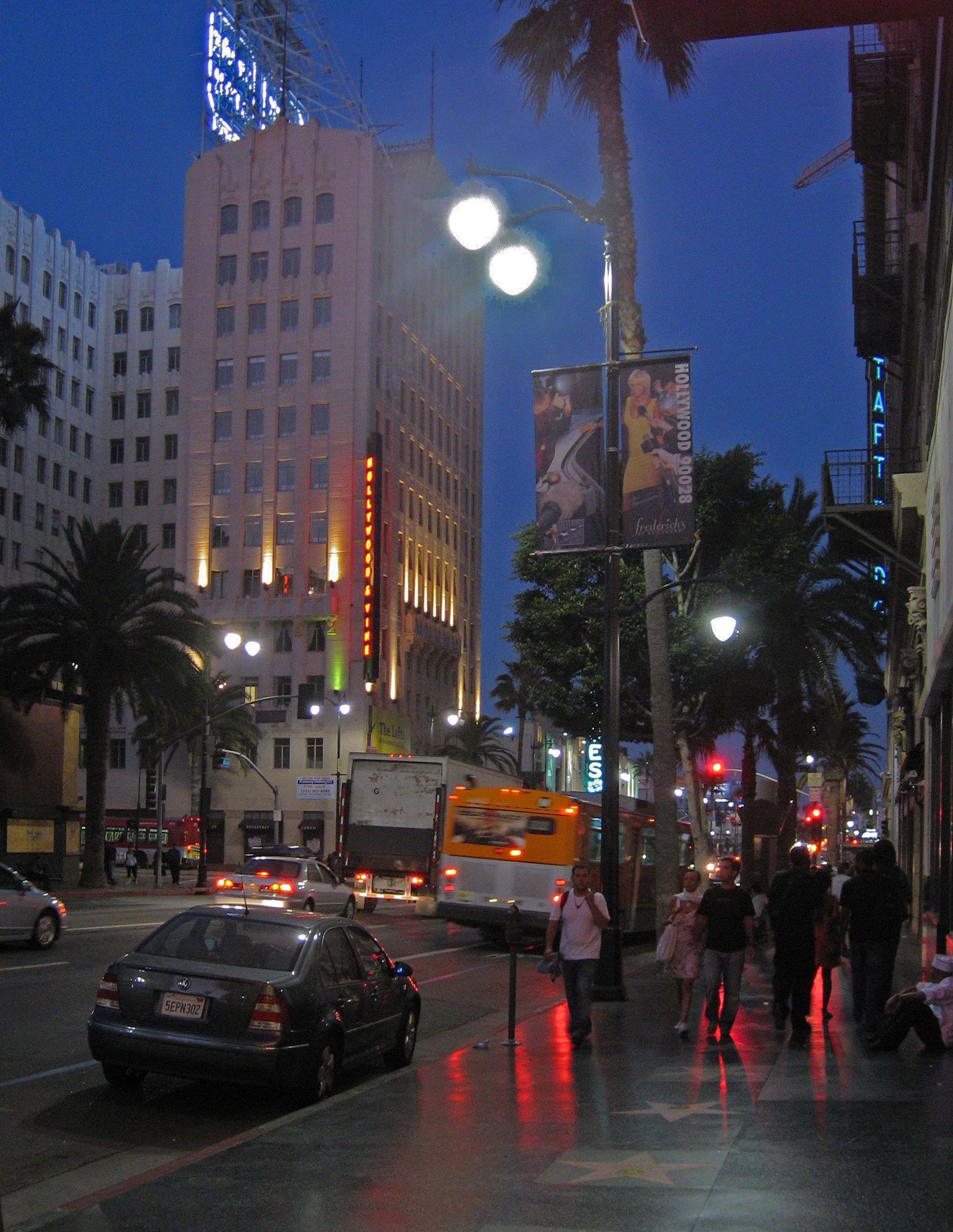
Hollywood Blvd at night

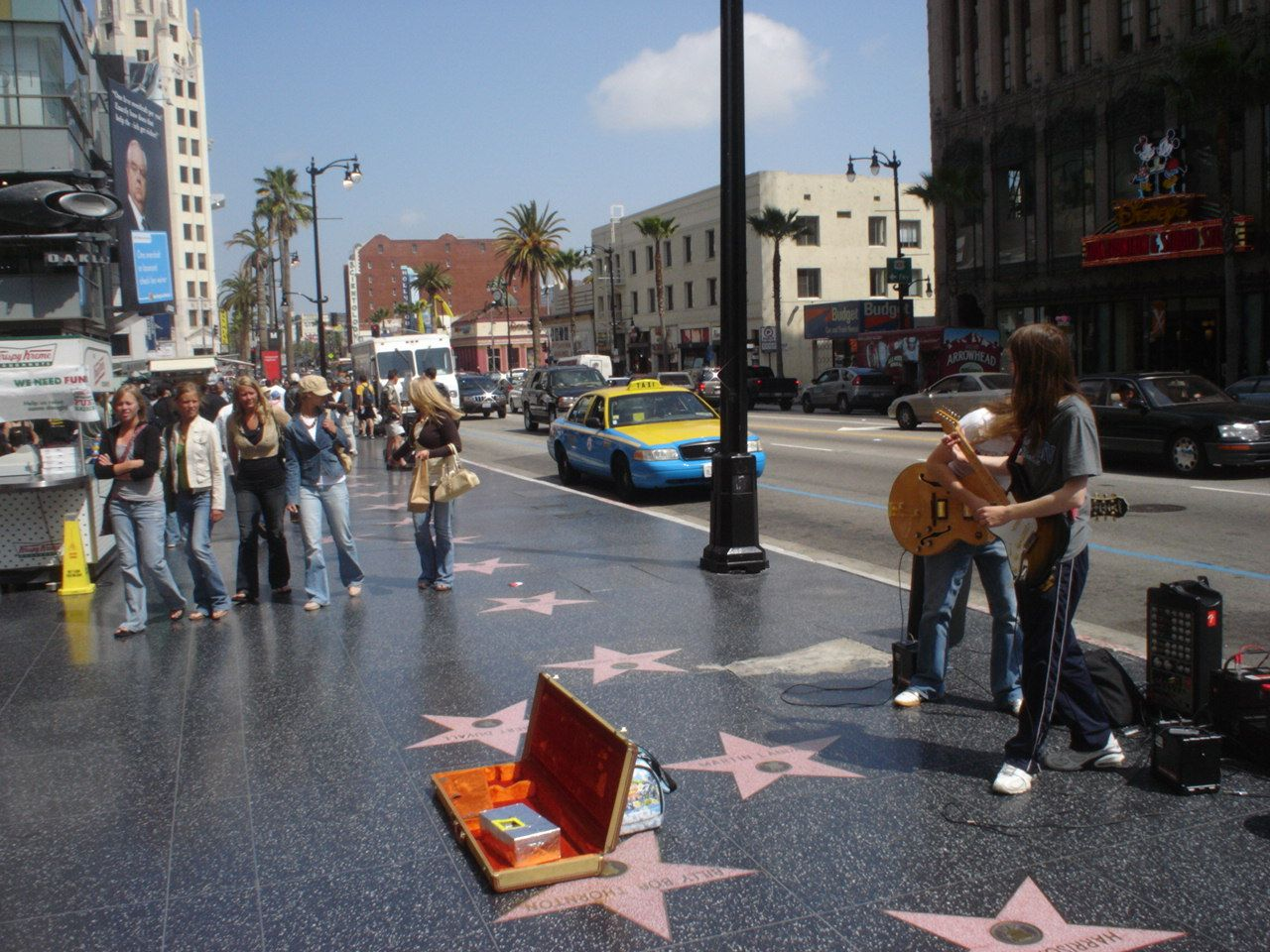
Hollywood Walk of Fame

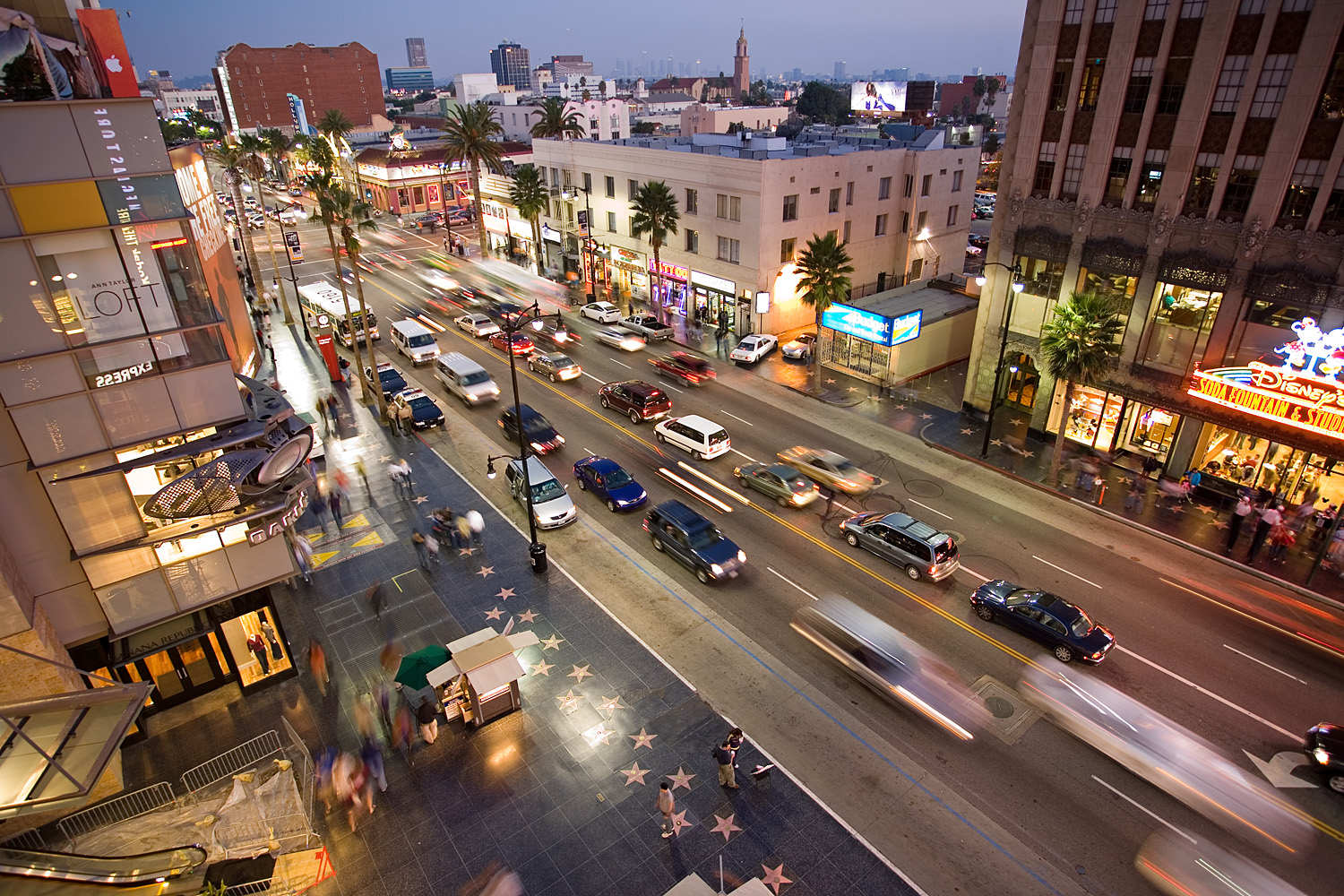
Hollywood Boulevard

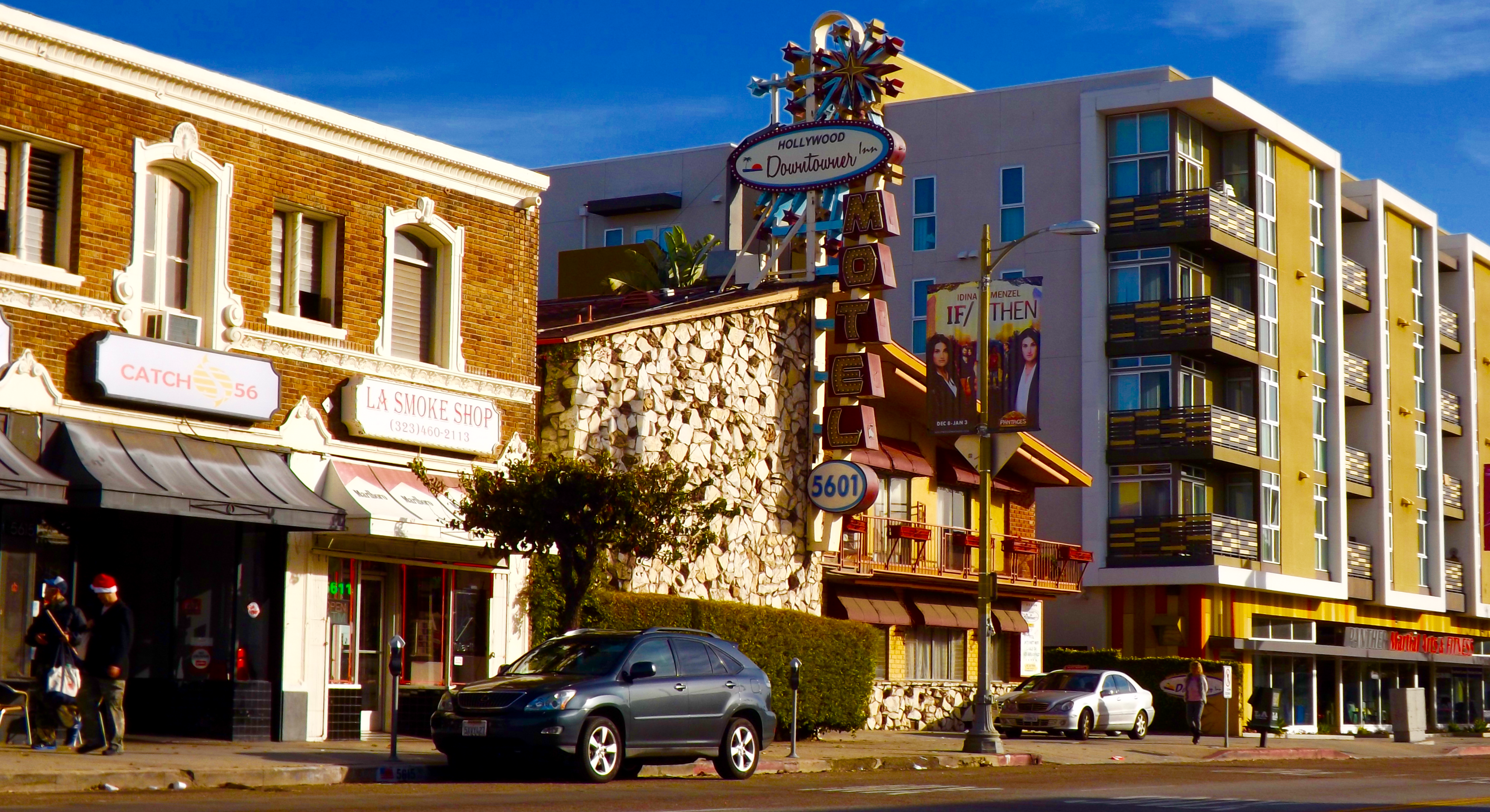
Hollywood Boulevard in Thai Town

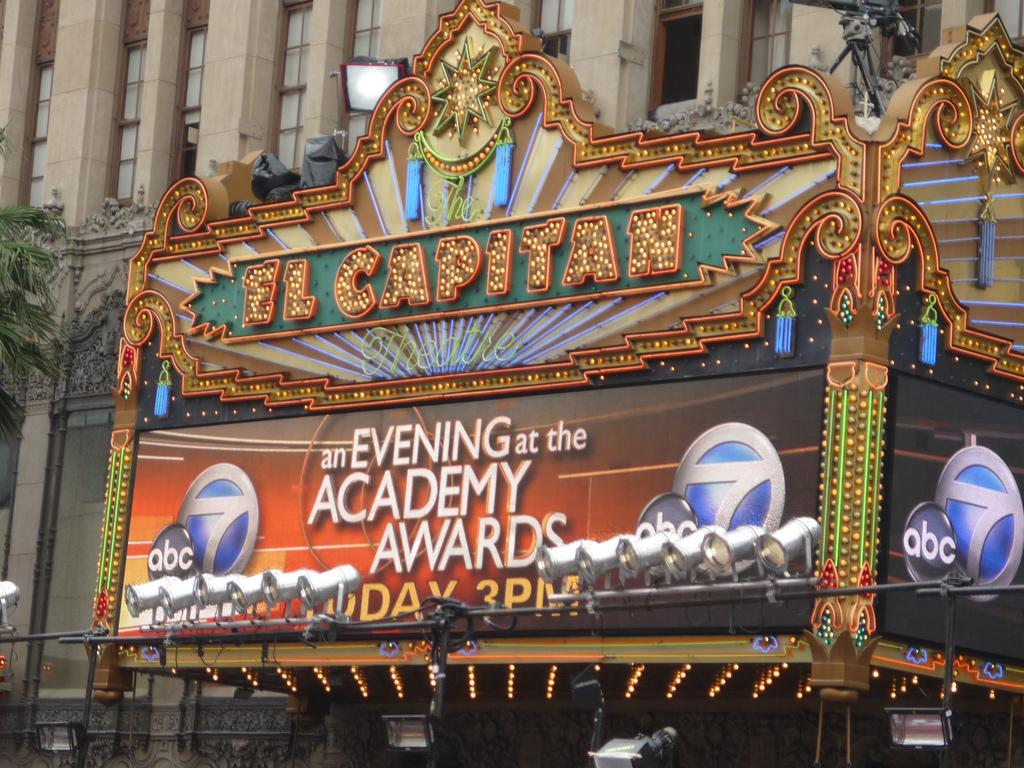
El Capitan Theatre

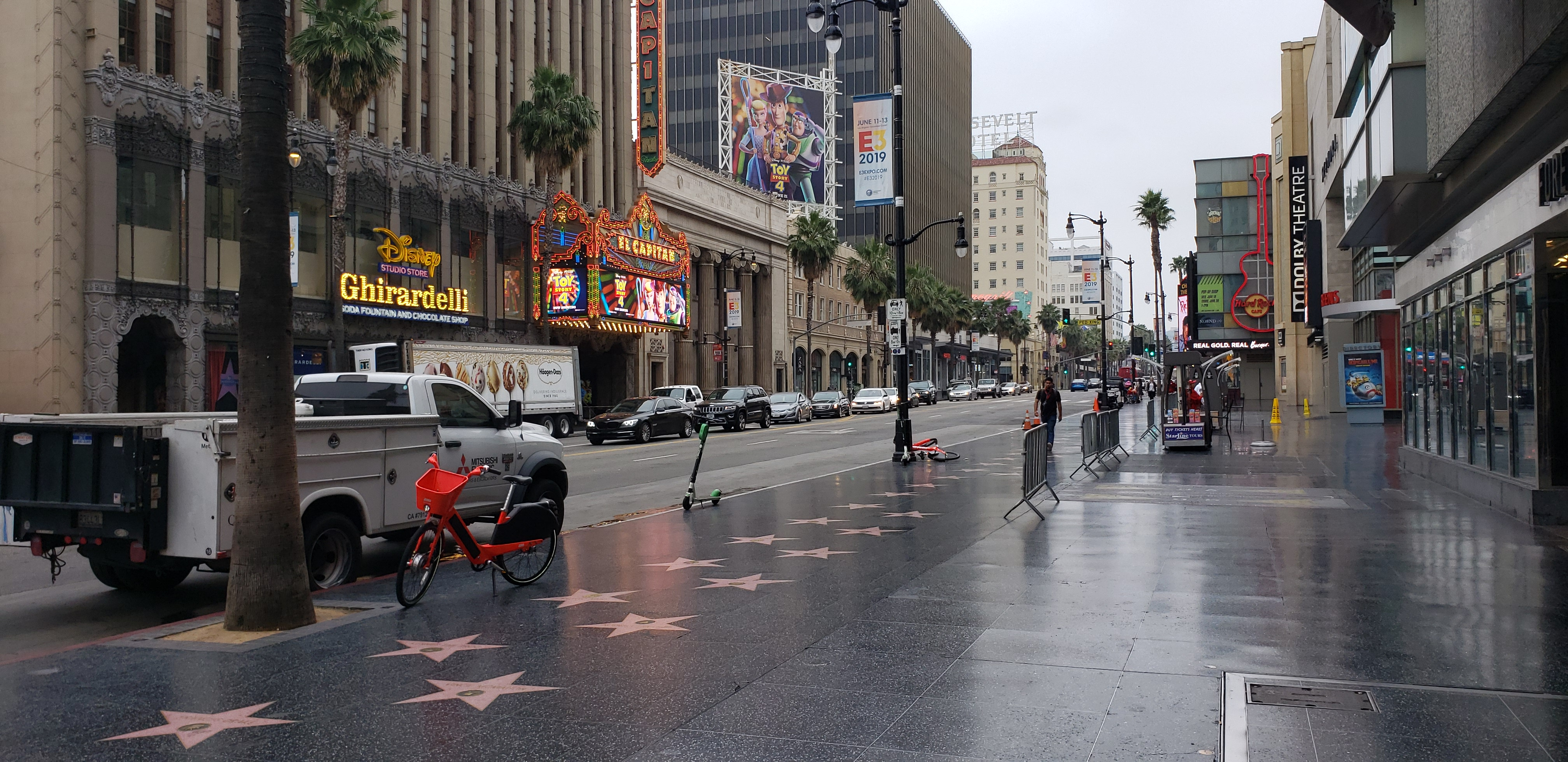
Hollywood Walk of Fame

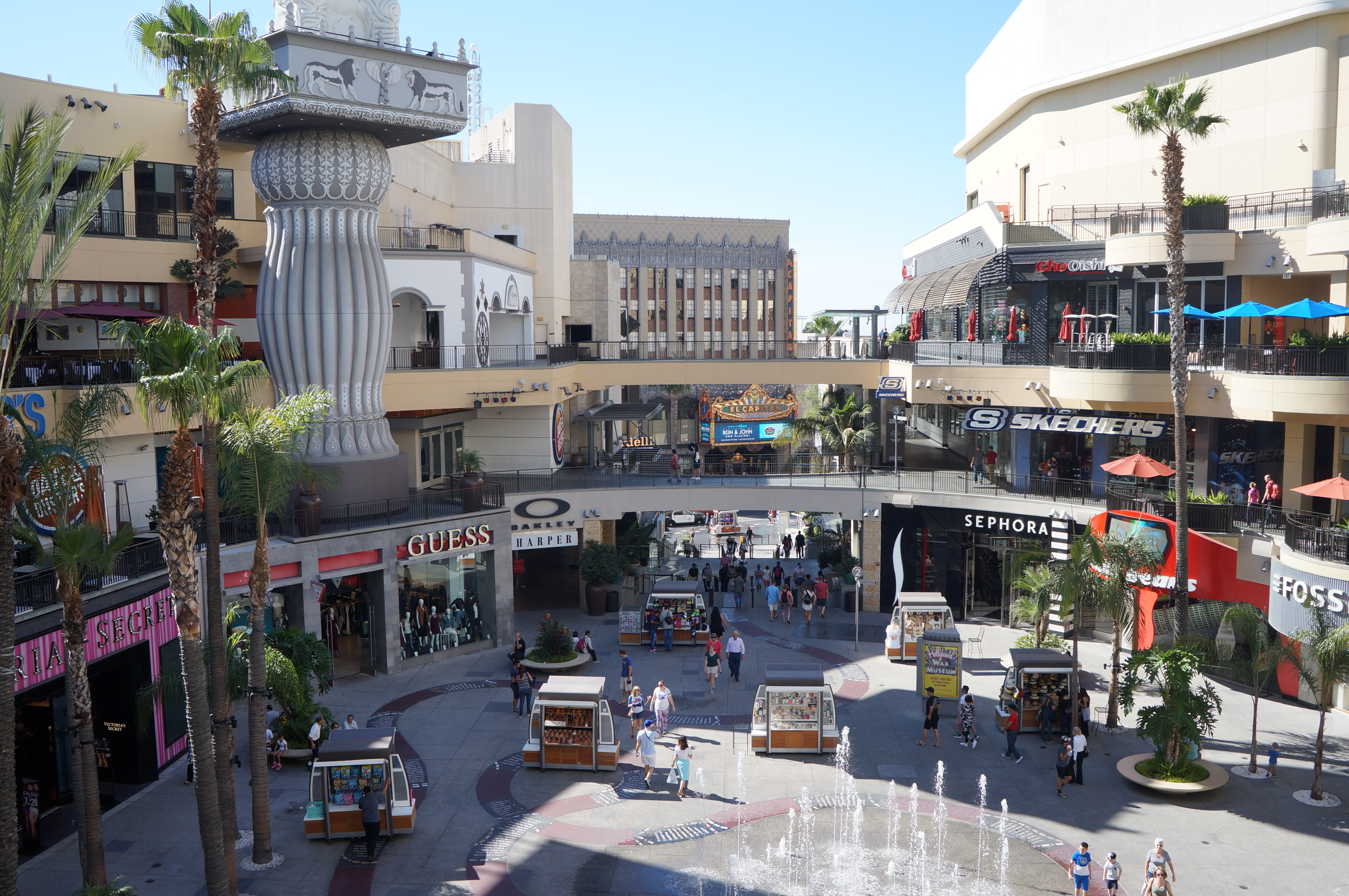
Ovation Hollywood, 2016

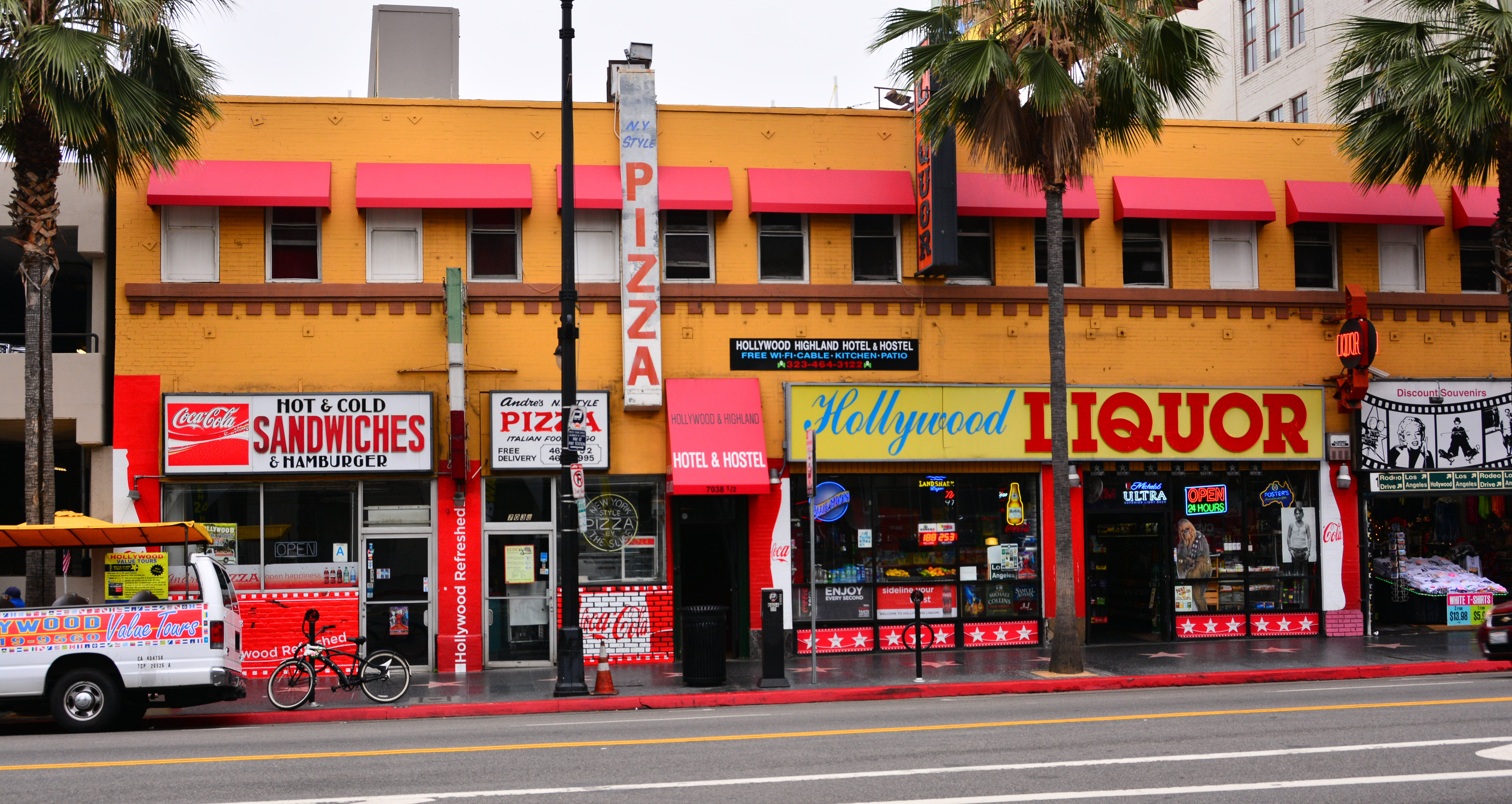
Near the TCL Chinese Theater
Vintage post cards featuring Hollywood Boulevard
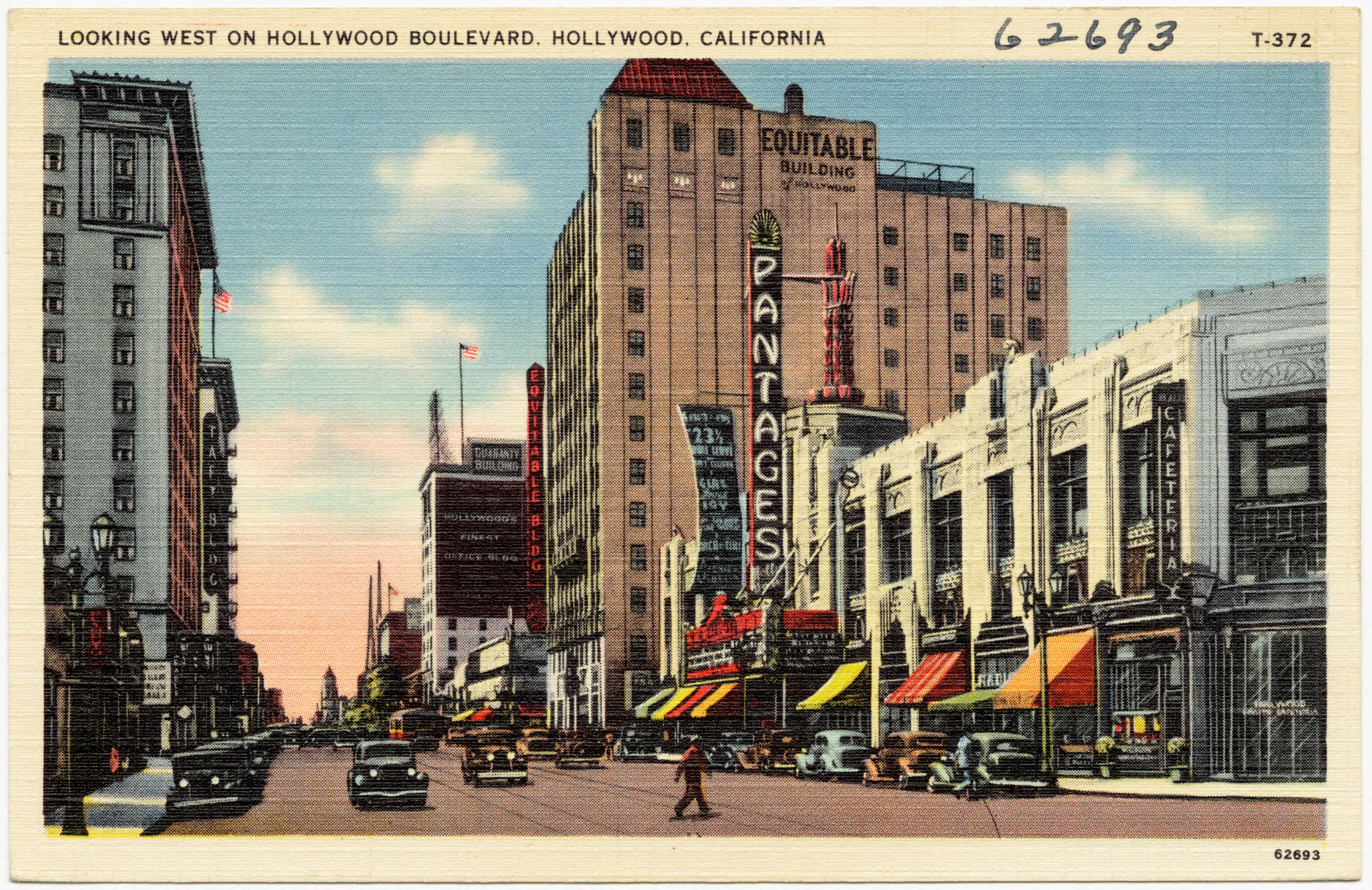
Hollywood Boulevard, looking west towards the Hollywood Pantages Theatre

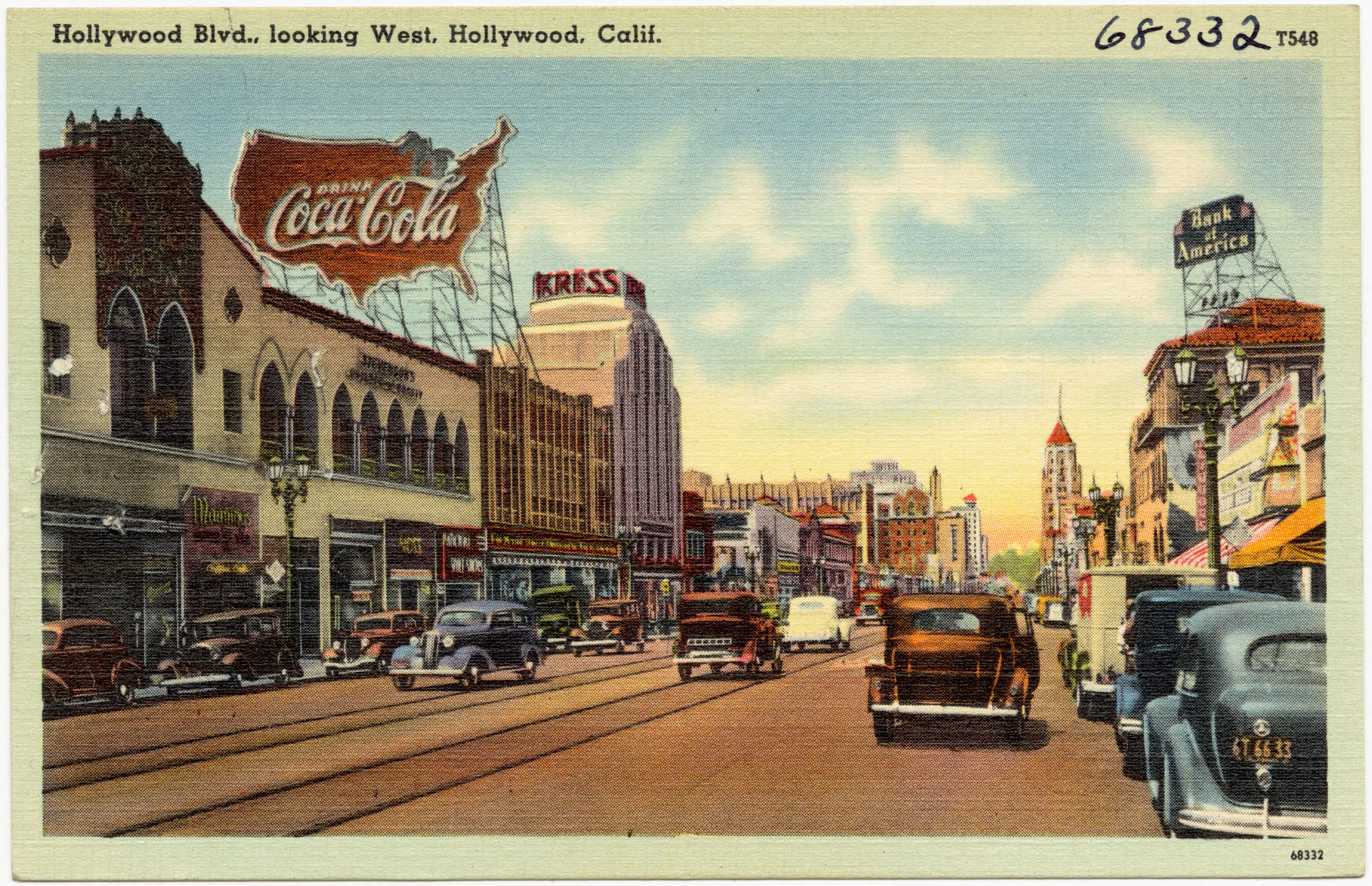
Hollywood Boulevard, looking west

== Events ==
A popular event that takes place on the Boulevard is the complete transformation of the street to a Christmas theme. Shops and department stores attract customers by lighting their stores and the entire street with decorated Christmas trees and Christmas lights. The street essentially becomes "Santa Claus Lane." The route of Hollywood Christmas Parade partially follows Hollywood Boulevard.

== Landmarks ==
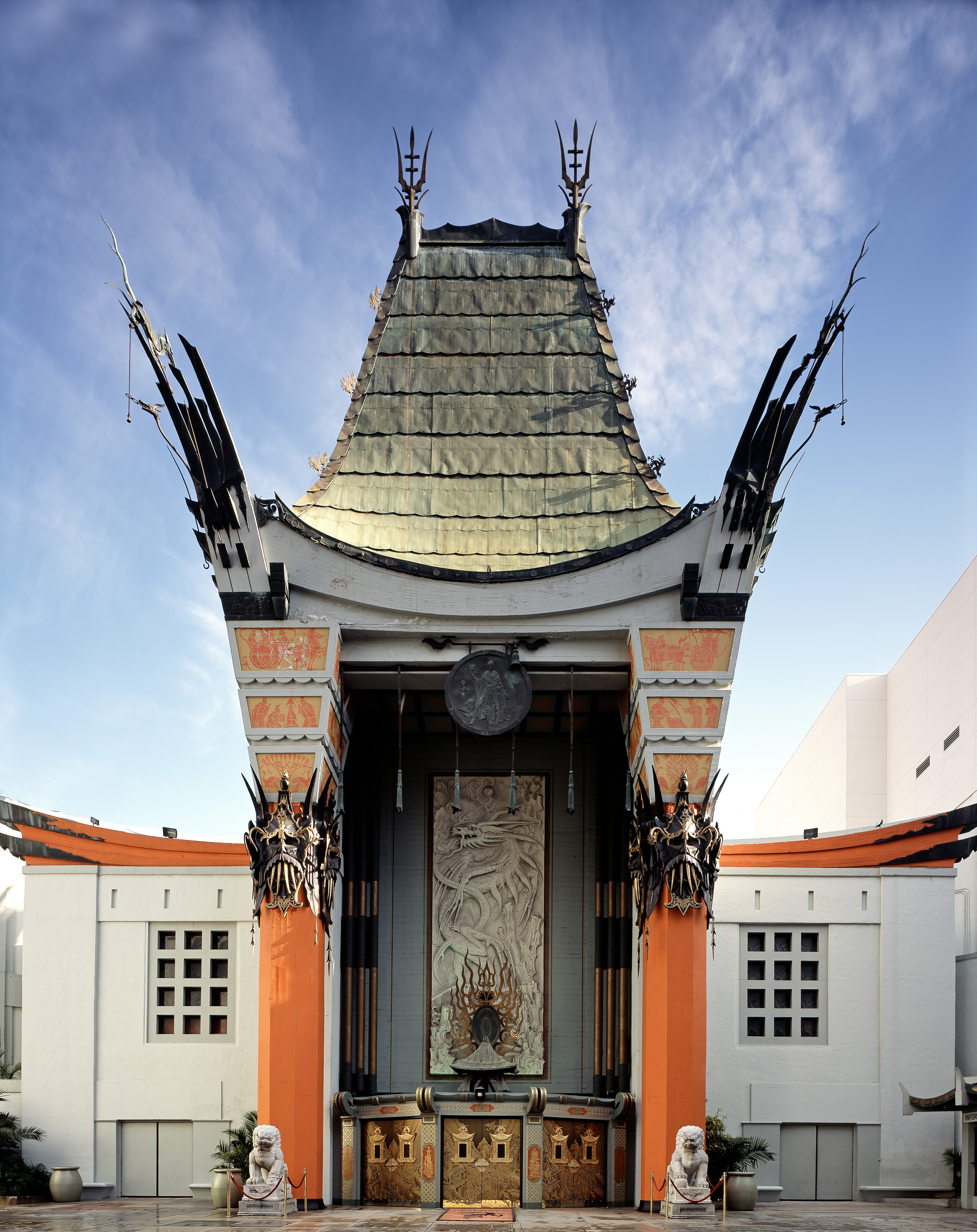
TCL Chinese Theatre

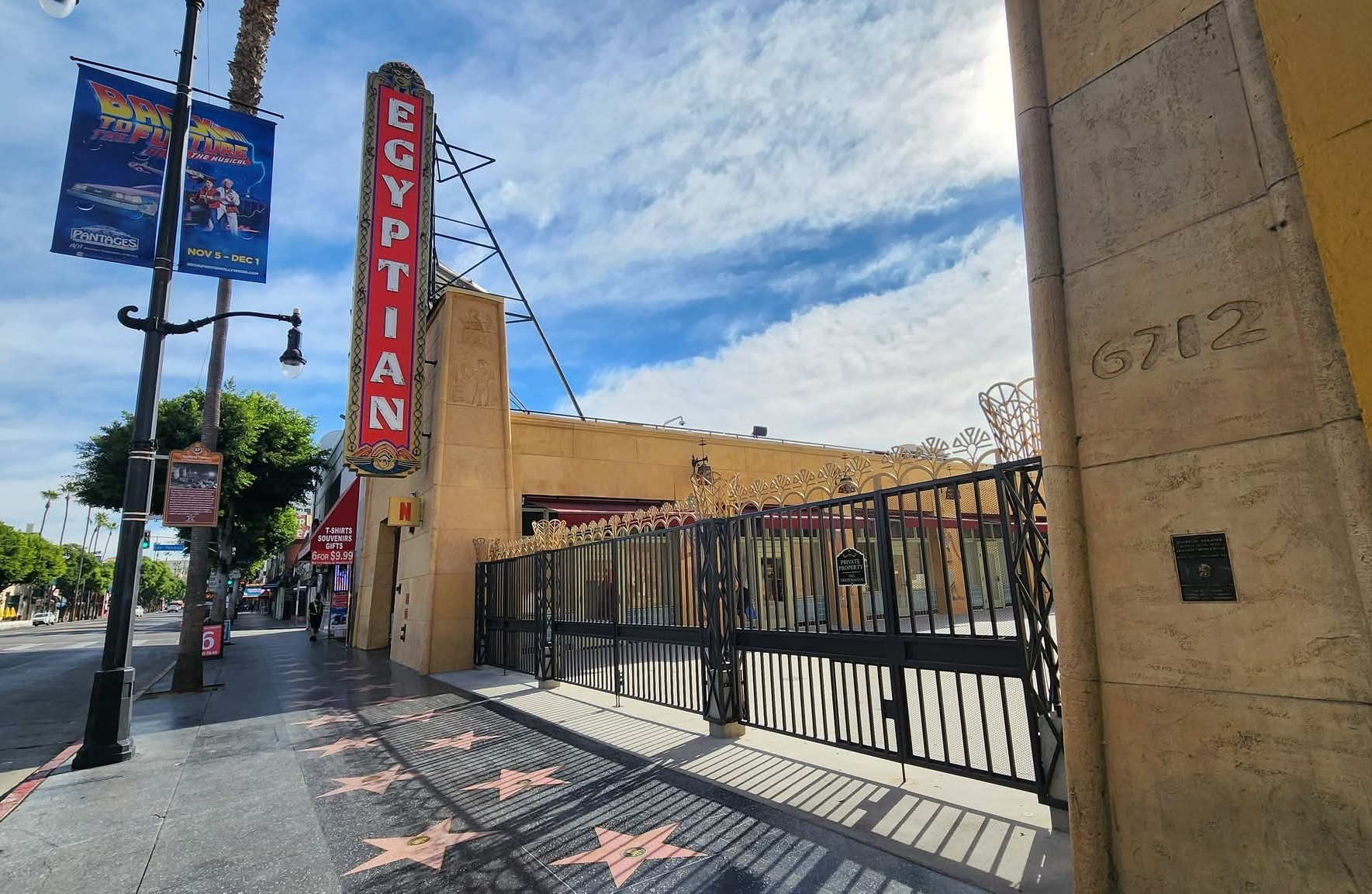
Grauman's Egyptian Theatre along Hollywood Boulervard in November, 2024.

- Barnsdall Art Park
- Bob Hope Square (Hollywood and Vine)
- Broadway Hollywood Building
- Grauman's Chinese Theatre
- Dolby Theatre
- Grauman's Egyptian Theatre
- El Capitan Theatre
- Fonda Theatre
- Frederick's of Hollywood
- Ovation Hollywood
- Hollywood Pacific Theatre
- Hollywood Pantages Theatre
- Hollywood Roosevelt Hotel
- Hollywood Walk of Fame
- Hollywood Wax Museum
- Hollywood Masonic Temple
- Madame Tussauds Hollywood
- Musso & Frank Grill
- Porn Block of Fame
- Ripley's Believe It Or Not! Odditorium

== See also ==
- List of Los Angeles Historic-Cultural Monuments in Hollywood
