= Hollywood/Highland station =

Rapid transit station in Los Angeles, California

Hollywood/Highland
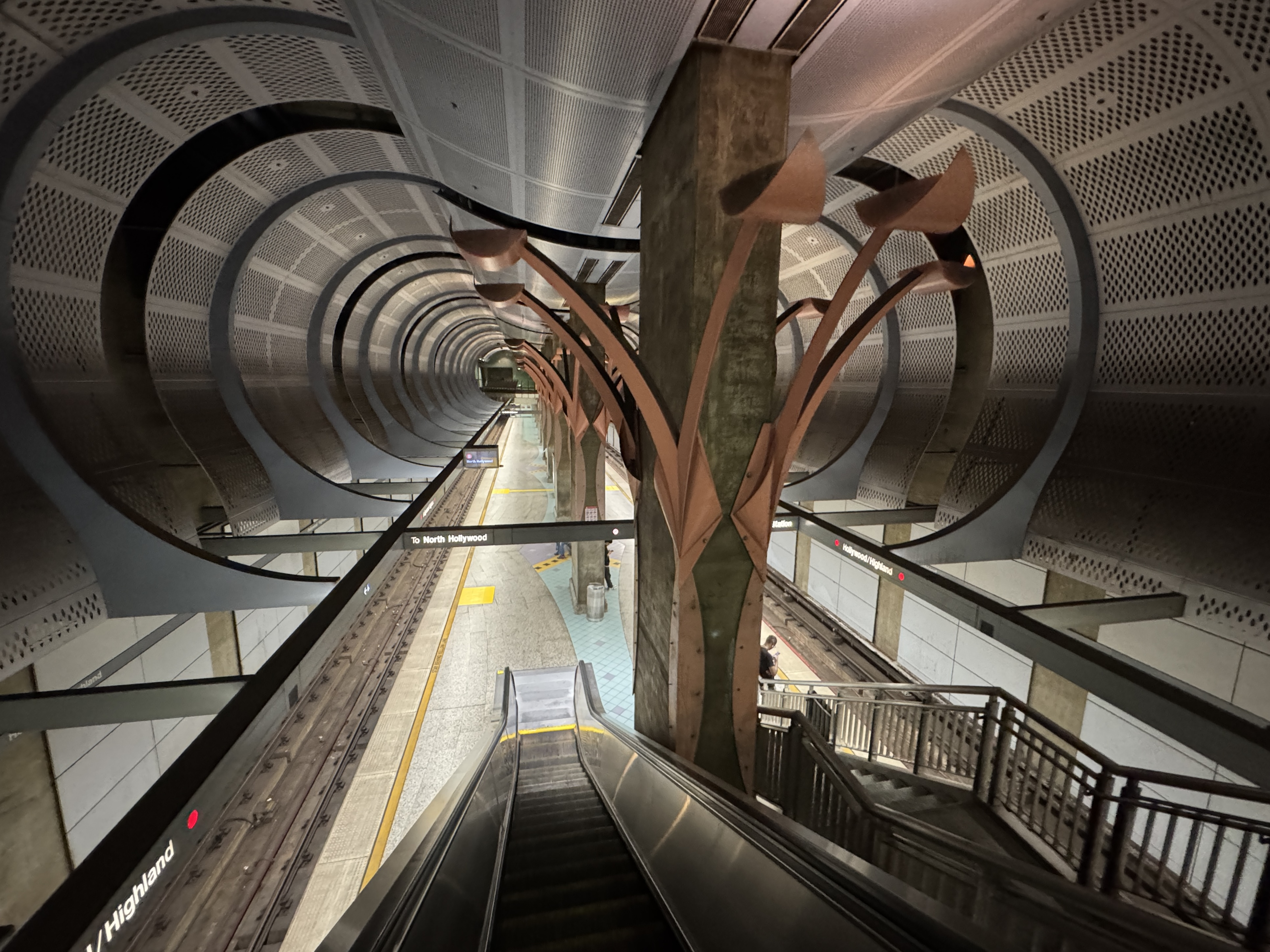
- Platform and ceiling design of Hollywood/Highland station, July 2025

General information
- Location: 6815 Hollywood Boulevard; Los Angeles, California
- Coordinates: 34.1016°N 118.3386°W
- Owner: Los Angeles Metro
- Platforms: 1 island platform
- Tracks: 2
- Connections: Antelope Valley Transit Authority; Hollywood Bowl shuttle; Los Angeles Metro Bus; LADOT DASH

Construction
- Structure type: Underground
- Parking: Paid parking nearby
- Cycle facilities: Metro Bike Share station

History
- Opened: June 24, 2000

Passengers
- FY 2025: 3,767 (avg. wkdy boardings)

Services
Preceding station	Metro Rail	Following station
Universal City/Studio City toward North Hollywood	B Line	Hollywood/Vine toward Union Station
Location

Hollywood/Highland station is an underground rapid transit station on the B Line of the Los Angeles Metro Rail system. It is located under Hollywood Boulevard at its intersection with Highland Avenue, after which the station is named. It is the westernmost Metro station in the Los Angeles neighborhood of Hollywood.

The station's entrance is located inside the Ovation Hollywood development which was built at about the same time as the station. The main entrances faces Hollywood Boulevard and is located in the center of the tourist area of Hollywood, near such attractions including the Dolby Theatre, El Capitan Theatre, TCL Chinese Theatre, Hollywood Museum and the Ripley's Believe It or Not! museum.

== Location ==
The station is in Hollywood on the corner of Hollywood Boulevard and Highland Avenue. Its entrance is inside the Ovation Hollywood shopping complex, on the Hollywood Boulevard side of the building. Pacific Electric Red Car interurban trains stopped on the surface in the early 1900s; this marked the junction of the Hollywood Line with the San Fernando Valley lines to Owensmouth and San Fernando.

The Ovation Hollywood is the home of the Dolby Theatre, which has been the venue of the annual Academy Awards ceremony since 2002. Due to security concerns, the Hollywood/Highland station is generally closed on the day of the ceremony.

== Design and architecture ==
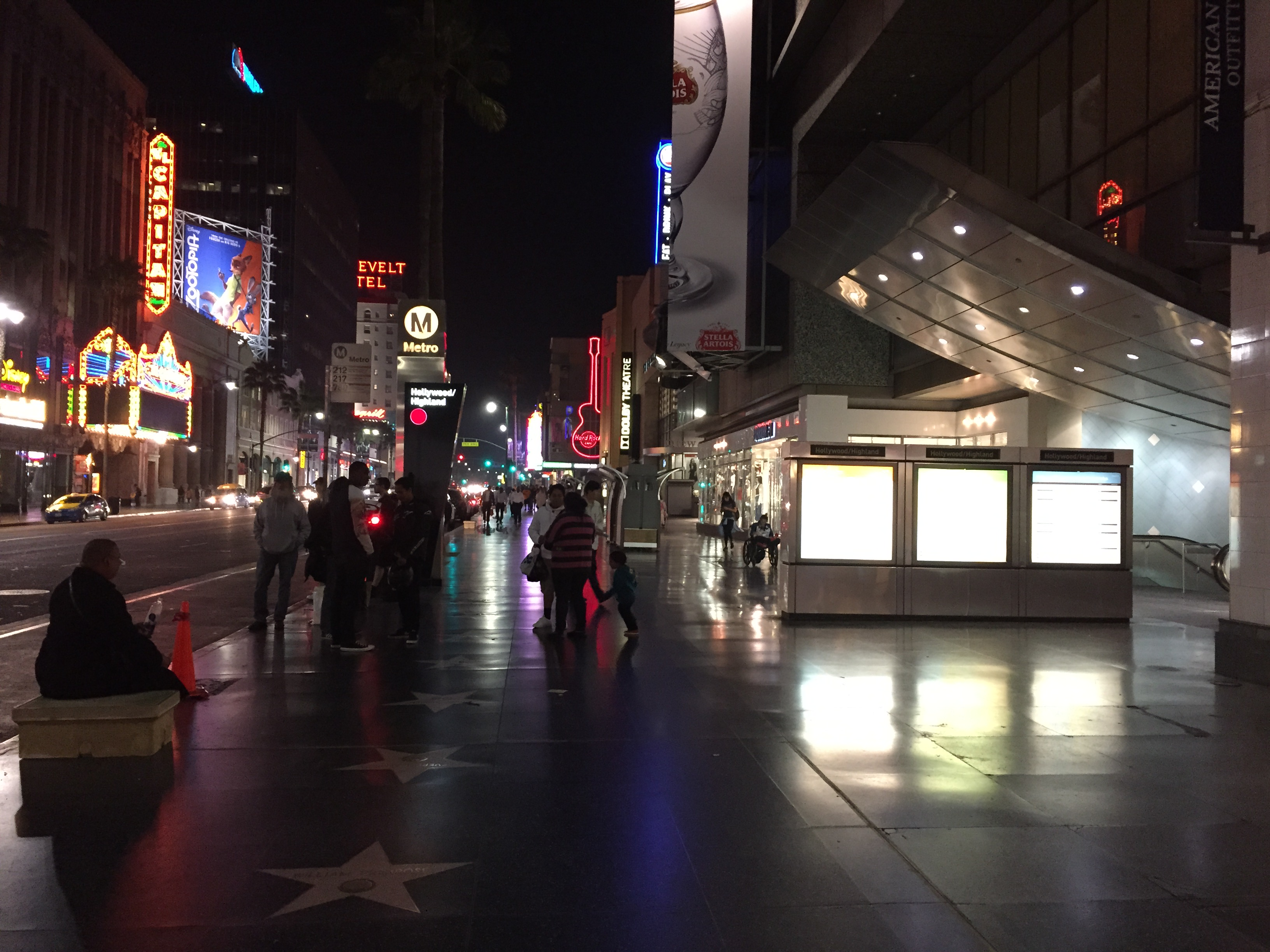
The station headhouse at night in 2016

The design of the station was created by three different firms. The designer of the station is Sheila Klein, and the constructor of the station is CannonDesign. The lighting, material and mechanical design are from HLB Lighting Design.

The construction of the station were to be made of equipments given by the Metro, which according to HLB, made it challenging. The lighting pillars of the station was to resemble like a flower, and it was carefully sized to match well with the smooth, curved ceiling which 'resembled a belly'. Sheila Klein named the architecture of the station, "Underground Girl".

== Service ==
=== Station layout ===
Hollywood/Highland is a two-story station; the top level is a mezzanine with ticket machines while the bottom is the platform level. The station uses a simple island platform with two tracks.

=== Hours and frequency ===
B Line trains run every day between approximately 4:30 a.m. and midnight. Trains operate every 10 minutes during peak hours. Early morning and night service is approximately every 20 minutes.

=== Connections ===
As of September 10, 2023, the following connections are available:

- Antelope Valley Transit Authority: 786
- Hollywood Bowl shuttle
- Los Angeles Metro Bus: 212, 217, 224 (late night only)
- LADOT DASH: Hollywood; West Hollywood Cityline Commuter

== Future K Line connection ==
The K Line is proposed to connect to this station via a future northern extension from its current northern terminus at Expo/Crenshaw station, which would offer connections to West Hollywood, Beverly Hills, Crenshaw District, Leimert Park, Miracle Mile, City of Inglewood, and LAX. It will also allow connections to the E Line, D Line, and C Line as well as SkyLink.

After receiving public comment proposing the idea, Metro considered an option to add a station at the Hollywood Bowl. Currently, taking the B Line to the Hollywood Bowl requires either a mile-long walk by foot along Highland Avenue, or a trip on a shuttle that connects Ovation Hollywood to the Hollywood Bowl. Neither option is particularly accessible for people with disabilities. Metro already works with the Hollywood Bowl to provide shuttles to and from events, and the new station would be an extension of that partnership. The addition of the Hollywood Bowl station was finalized as part of the project when Metro's board of directors approved its locally approved alternative (LPA) at its March 26, 2026 board meeting.
