= Ovation Hollywood =

Shopping mall in Hollywood, Los Angeles

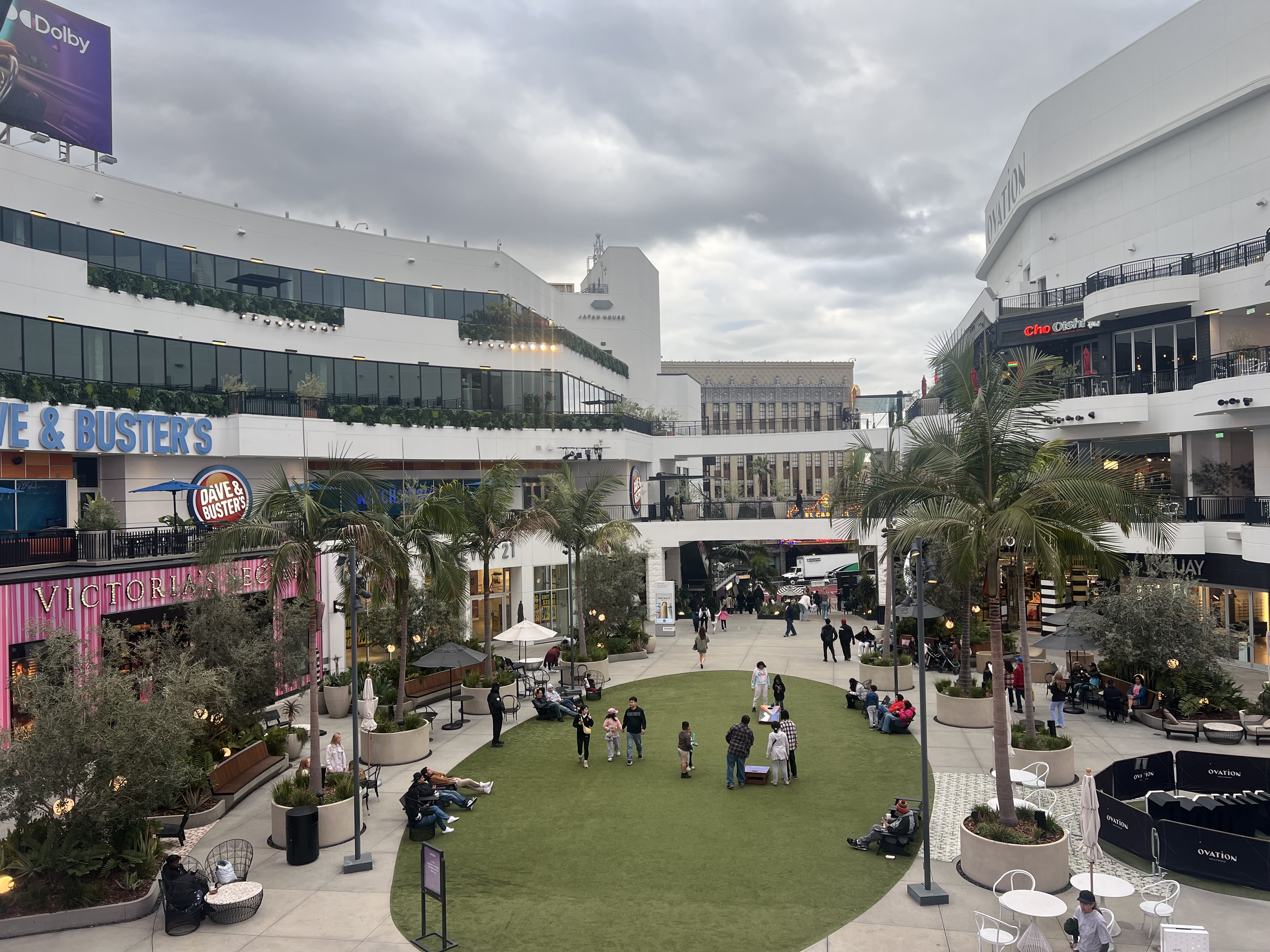
- Courtyard
- Coordinates: 34°06′08.5″N 118°20′22″W
- Address: 6801 Hollywood Boulevard; Hollywood, California; 90028
- Opened: November 9, 2001; 25 years ago
- Previous names: Hollywood & Highland
- Developer: TrizecHahn
- Owner: DJM and Gaw Capital
- Architect: Ehrenkrantz Eckstut & Kuhn Architects
- Num. of stores: 60
- Num. of anchor tenants: 1 (Dolby Theatre)
- Floor area: 640,000 sq ft (59,000 m^{2})
- Floors: 5 (retail)
- Parking: On-street, parking garage
- Public transit: Hollywood/Highland
- Website: ovationhollywood.com

Ovation Hollywood (formerly Hollywood & Highland) is an outdoor shopping center and entertainment complex at the intersection of Hollywood Boulevard and Highland Avenue in the Hollywood neighborhood of Los Angeles, California, United States.

The 387,000-square-foot (36,000 m^{2}) shopping center also includes the TCL Chinese Theatre, a historic movie palace, and the Dolby Theatre, an auditorium that has been home to the Academy Awards since 2002. The historic site was once the home of the famed Hollywood Hotel. Located in the heart of Hollywood, along the Hollywood Walk of Fame, it is among the most visited tourist destinations and shopping complexes in Los Angeles, allowing anyone to take a seat under the arch for this free series of movie screenings.

The complex sits just across Hollywood Boulevard from the El Capitan Theatre and offers views of the Hollywood Hills and Hollywood Sign to the north, Santa Monica Mountains to the west and downtown Los Angeles to the southeast. The centerpiece of the complex is a massive three-story courtyard inspired by the Babylon scene from the D.W. Griffith film Intolerance. The developer of the shopping center built parts of the archway and two pillars with elephant sculptures on the capitals, just as seen in the film, to the same full scale. It gives visitors an idea of how large the original set must have been.

The center has more than 70 shops and 25 restaurants. Major retail tenants that face Hollywood Boulevard include Foot Locker, Sephora, and Walgreens. The complex also houses a Lucky Strike Lanes bowling alley, and a nightclub. The complex also houses 65,000 square feet (6,000 m^{2}) of gathering spaces including the Grand Ballroom, used for the Oscars Governors Ball. Celebrity chef Wolfgang Puck operates his regional headquarters out of the complex. The center also includes television broadcast facilities that in 2004 included the studios for the daily talk show On Air With Ryan Seacrest. Currently, the studio is home to Revolt TV.

The 637-room Loews Hollywood Hotel is also part of the site. The Metro B Line's Hollywood/Highland station is beneath the structure. Also, Metro Local lines 212, 217, 222, 237, 656 and Metro Rapid 780 serve the complex.

== Site history ==
The site was the location of the 1902 Hollywood Hotel, in which many celebrities stayed in the early days of Hollywood. The hotel was demolished in August 1956 and, despite initial plans for a high-rise hotel and a department store on the site, it was replaced by the twelve-story First Federal Building of the First Federal Savings & Loan Association of Hollywood; a shopping center; and parking lots. These stood until 1998.

== Redevelopment ==
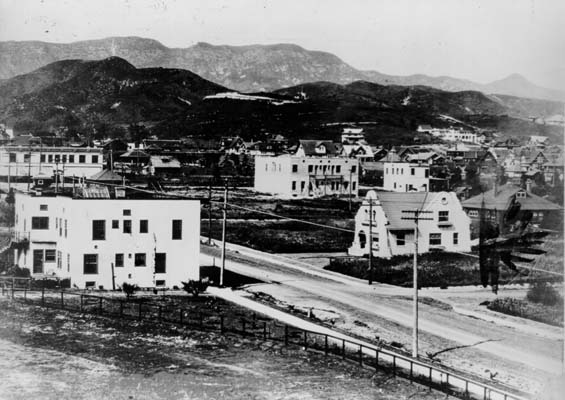
The intersection of Hollywood Boulevard and Highland Avenue, 1907

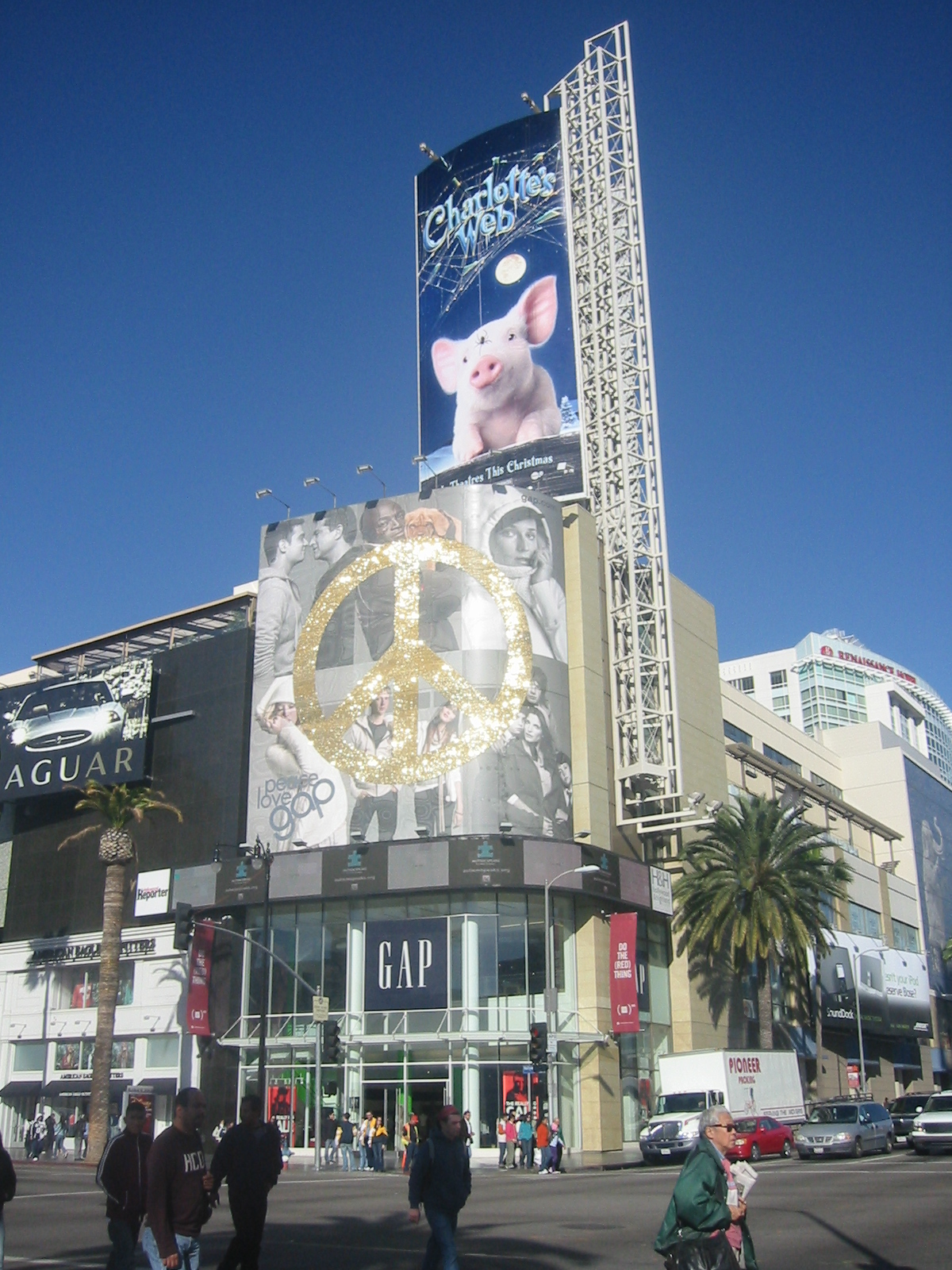
Ovation Hollywood

Developed by TrizecHahn and with funds from the Community Redevelopment Agency, the complex opened as Hollywood & Highland after three years of construction in November 2001.

The project was an example of joint development, in which a public agency leases the right to develop a parcel in exchange for improvements to the property, in this case, an enhanced portal to the Hollywood/Highland Metro B Line station and a 3,000 space underground parking lot. TrizecHahn leased 1.35 acres (5,500 m^{2}) of Los Angeles County Metropolitan Transportation Authority land for 55 years at a rate of $492,000 per year (with additional increases added every five years based on the Consumer Price Index) and four 11-year optional extensions.

Leading up to the construction of the development the City of Los Angeles was persuaded, through its Community Redevelopment Agency (CRA), to contribute at least $90 million in 1998 toward the site's initial construction. This was in addition to the costs of constructing the Red Line subway station below the mall.

Trizec Properties sold its interest in the development for over $200 million in 2004 to CIM Group. CIM rebranded Hollywood & Highland and repositioned the center with higher-end tenants. In 2005, the center underwent renovations to add additional features such as escalators leading visitors from Hollywood Boulevard directly to the third floor of the central courtyard, new signage, and new stores.

In 2019, real estate investment firms DJM Capital Partners, Inc. and Gaw Capital partnered and purchased the mall for $325 million. They announced plans for a major renovation to include both rebranding and upgrading the retail levels and courtyard, adding office space in the upper floors, and removal of the Babylon themed decor. The renovations on this complex began work in 2020. The renovated complex was then renamed and rebranded to Ovation Hollywood in 2022.

== Controversy and criticism ==
The complex opened in 2001 with a conditional use permit that enabled, among other things, for the center to have special exemptions of Los Angeles billboard ordinances. Despite objections of some residents and neighbors, in 2002 this agreement was amended and extended for an additional 20 years. L.A. City Councilman Eric Garcetti, who then represented the Hollywood-area district and was elected mayor in 2013, supported extending this special permit.

The design of the center has been criticized by multiple reporters and journalists. In 2007, Curbed L.A., an online magazine, named Hollywood & Highland the "winner" of their Ugliest Building in Los Angeles contest. In selecting Hollywood & Highland, they cited its aesthetics, pedestrian unfriendliness (including the lack of storefronts on the side facing Highland Ave.), confusing circulation, and "mish-mash of architectural styles".

== Impact ==
The center played a significant role in attracting development to other parts of Hollywood Boulevard. The TV Guide Hollywood Center (formerly owned by CIM Group) across the street reconstructed the ground floor and has attracted new tenants.
