= Hollywood/Western station =

Rapid transit station in Los Angeles, California

Hollywood/Western
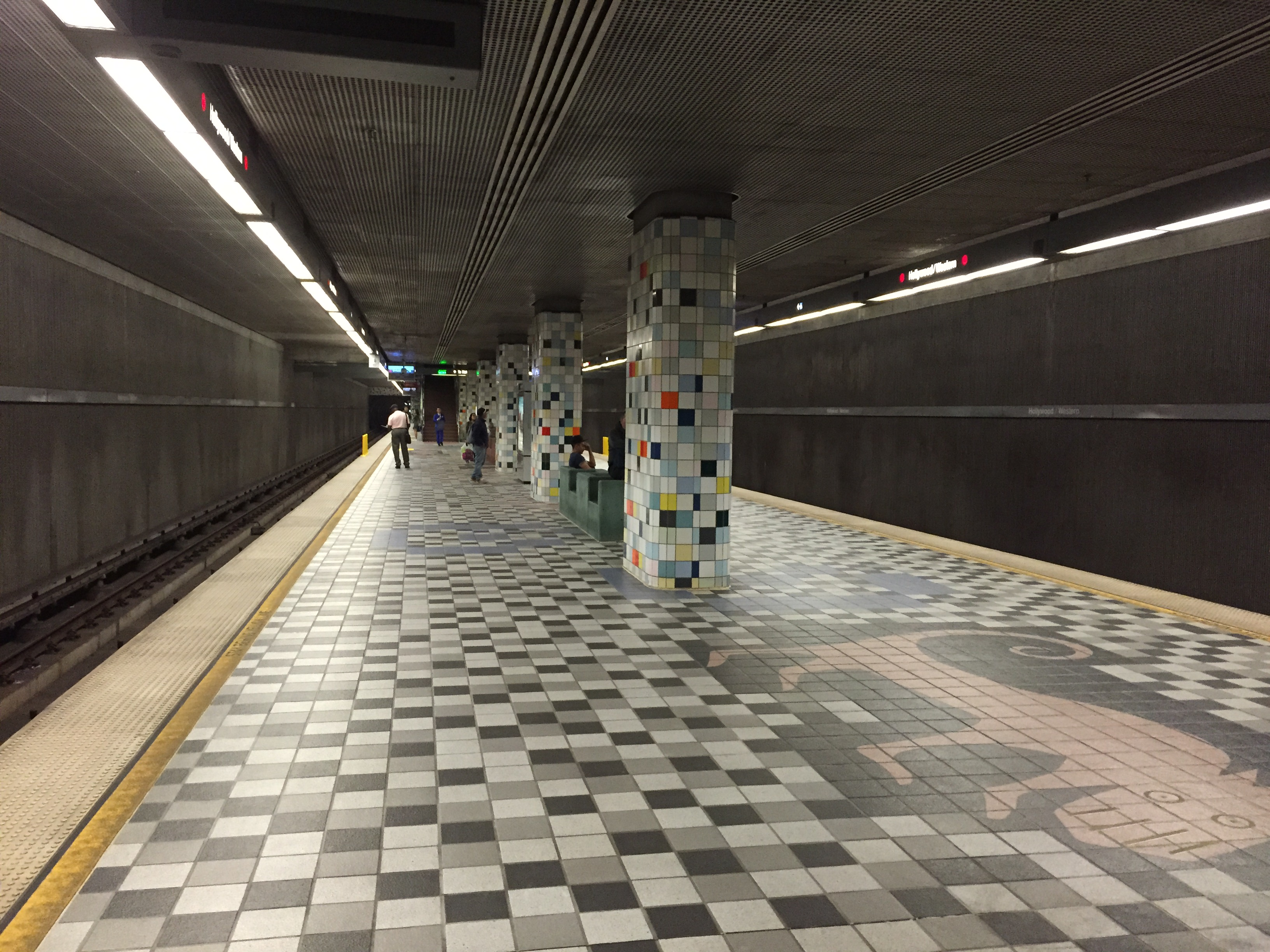
- Hollywood/Western station platform

General information
- Location: 5450 Hollywood Boulevard; Los Angeles, California
- Coordinates: 34.1015°N 118.3092°W
- Owner: Los Angeles Metro
- Platforms: 1 island platform
- Tracks: 2
- Connections: Los Angeles Metro Bus

Construction
- Structure type: Underground
- Cycle facilities: Metro Bike Share station, racks and lockers

History
- Opened: June 12, 1999

Passengers
- FY 2026: 2,369 (avg. wkdy boardings)

Services
Preceding station	Metro Rail	Following station
Hollywood/Vine toward North Hollywood	B Line	Vermont/Sunset toward Union Station
Location

Hollywood/Western station is an underground rapid transit station on the B Line of the Los Angeles Metro Rail system. It is located under Hollywood Boulevard at its intersection with Western Avenue. The station serves the East Hollywood area including Thai Town and Little Armenia.

== Station design ==
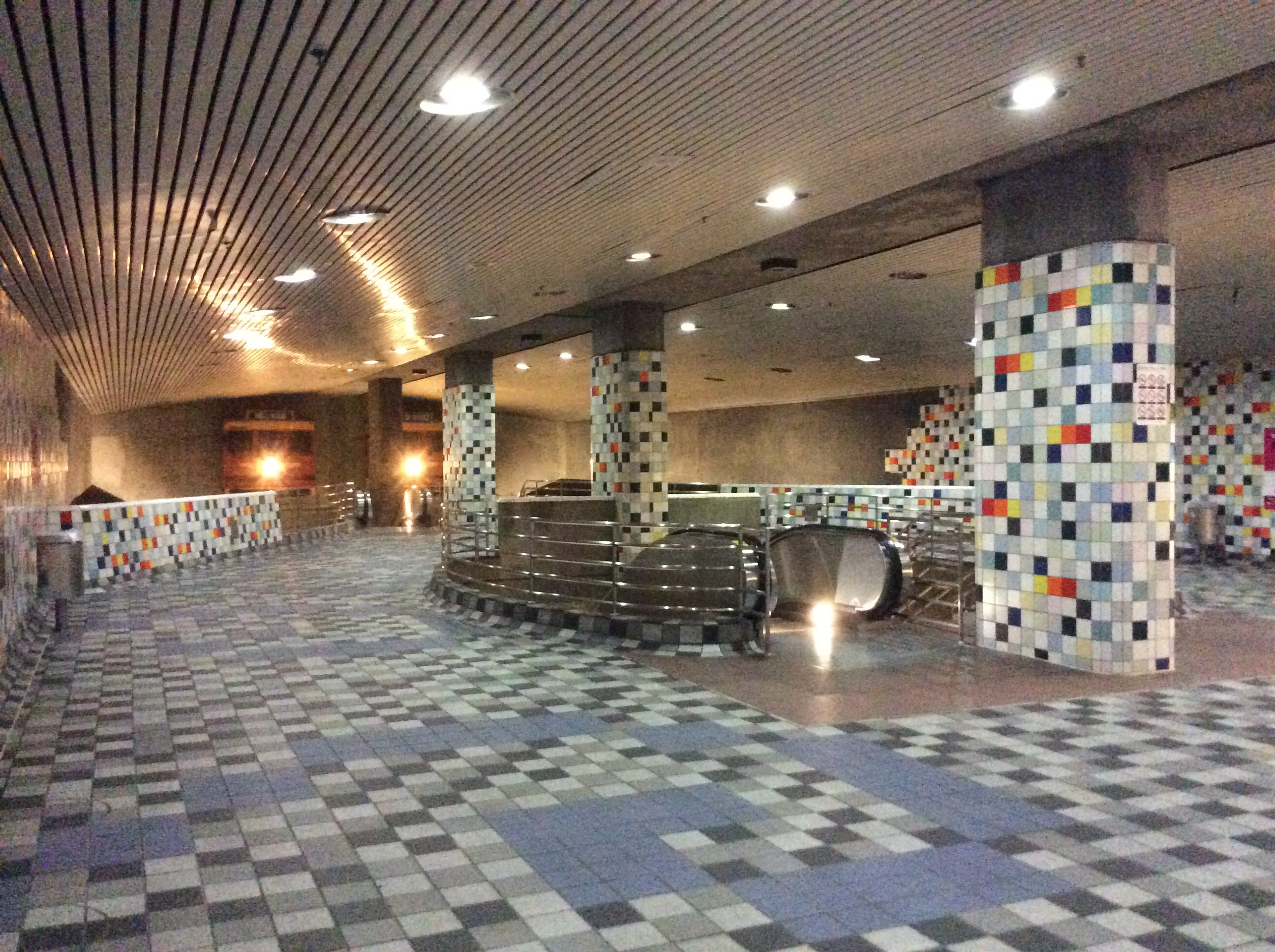
Mezzanine level of the station

Hollywood/Western station has a single island platform oriented east–west under Hollywood Boulevard, with a mezzanine above. The single station entrance and elevator are located in a plaza on the southeast corner of the intersection. The station was designed by Escudero–Fribourg Architects, while May Sun designed the interior finish and artworks, which reflect the neighborhood's immigrant heritage. The walls and floors are covered by black, gray, and white tiles, with colorful highlights on the walls. Armenian, Chinese, and Mayan symbols are depicted on granite pavers. Some wall panels display historic photographs of the neighborhood; others have depictions of fossils discovered during excavation of the station. Sculptures of two Pacific Electric Red Cars hang over the platform from the mezzanine wall.

== Service ==
=== Station layout ===
Hollywood/Western is a two-story station; the top level is a mezzanine with ticket machines while the bottom is the platform level. The station uses a simple island platform with two tracks.

=== Hours and frequency ===
B Line trains run every day between approximately 4:30 a.m. and midnight. Trains operate every 10 minutes during peak hours. Early morning and night service is approximately every 20 minutes.

=== Connections ===
As of September 10, 2023, the following connections are available:

- Los Angeles Metro Bus: 180, 207, 217
