= Hollywood/Vine station =

Rapid transit station in Los Angeles, California

Hollywood/Vine
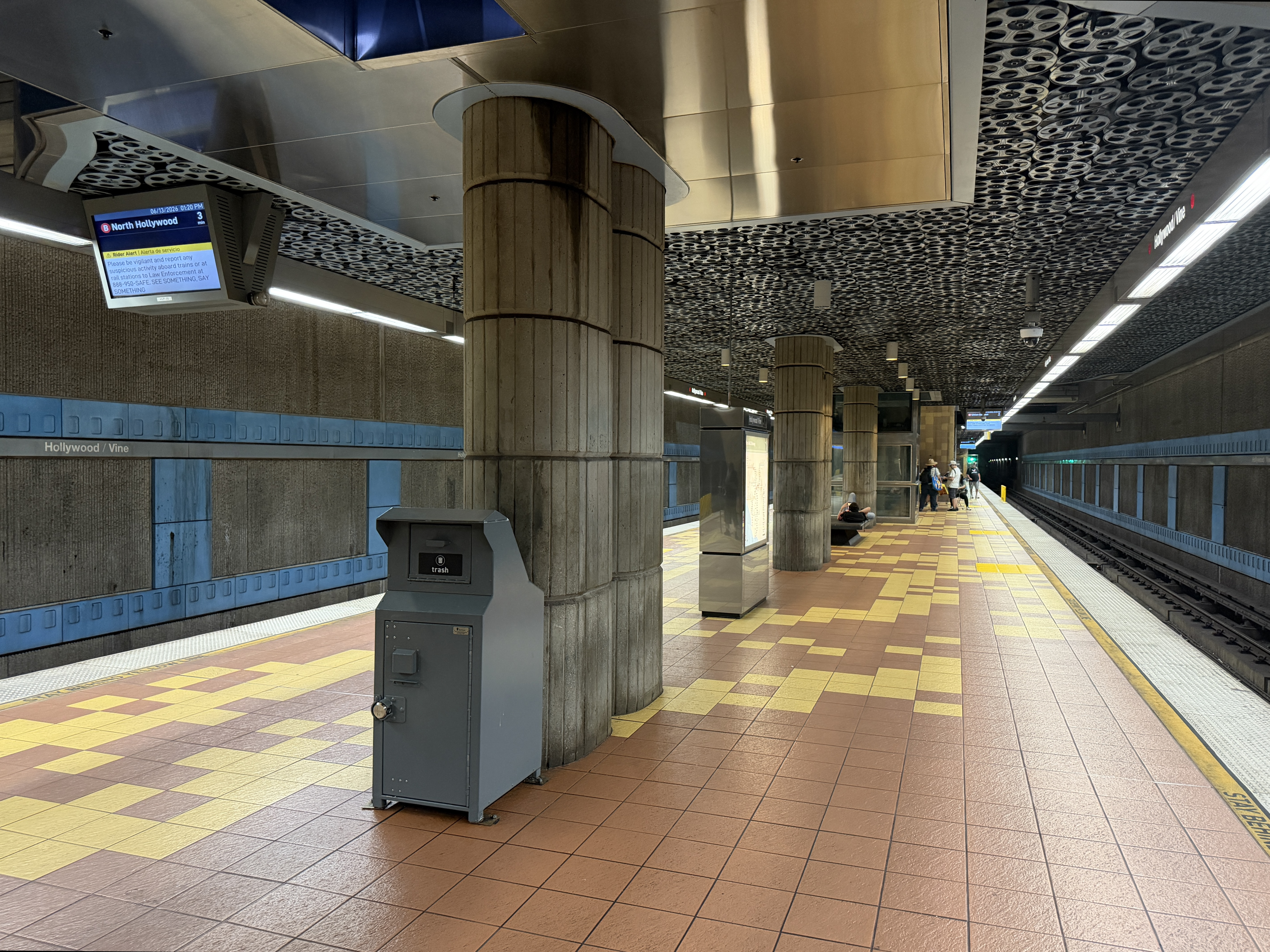
- Hollywood/Vine station platform

General information
- Location: 6250 Hollywood Boulevard; Los Angeles, California
- Coordinates: 34.101667°N 118.326944°W
- Owner: Los Angeles Metro
- Platforms: 1 island platform
- Tracks: 2
- Connections: Los Angeles Metro Bus; LADOT DASH

Construction
- Structure type: Underground
- Parking: Paid parking nearby
- Cycle facilities: Metro Bike Share station, Metro Bike Hub, and racks

History
- Opened: June 12, 1999

Passengers
- FY 2026: 2,585 (avg. wkdy boardings)

Services
Preceding station	Metro Rail	Following station
Hollywood/Highland toward North Hollywood	B Line	Hollywood/Western toward Union Station
Location

Hollywood/Vine station is an underground rapid transit station on the B Line of the Los Angeles Metro Rail system. It is located below the iconic Hollywood and Vine intersection of Hollywood Boulevard and Vine Street, after which the station is named, in the Los Angeles neighborhood of Hollywood.

The central station of the three subway stops in Hollywood, within walking distance of many important Hollywood landmarks including the Capitol Records Building, CBS Columbia Square, The Fonda Theatre, Hollywood Palladium and Pantages Theatre. The station is also below the Hollywood Walk of Fame and close to the Gower Gulch.

== History ==
Hollywood/Vine opened on June 12, 1999, as the western terminus of the northern branch of the Red Line. Upon the opening of the westward extension to North Hollywood in 2000, it lost its title as the end of the line.

=== Transit-oriented development ===
In accordance with Metro's initiatives to spur transit-oriented development around its stations, Hollywood/Vine has become a prime target for regeneration. The W Hotel opened a 300-room location in a 2.3-acre (0.93 ha) mixed-use site with condominiums and 30,000 sq ft (2,790 m^{2}) of street retail space. In addition, the 1600 Vine complex to the south contains 375 apartments and 28,000 sq ft (2,600 m^{2}) of street-level retail.

== Service ==
=== Station layout ===
Hollywood/Vine is a two-story station; the top level is a mezzanine with ticket machines while the bottom is the platform level. The station uses a simple island platform with two tracks.

=== Hours and frequency ===
B Line trains run every day between approximately 4:30 a.m. and midnight. Trains operate every 10 minutes during peak hours. Early morning and night service is approximately every 20 minutes.

=== Connections ===
As of September 10, 2023, the following connections are available:

- Los Angeles Metro Bus: 180, 210, 212, 217, 222
- LADOT DASH: Beachwood Canyon, Hollywood, Hollywood/Wilshire

== Design ==
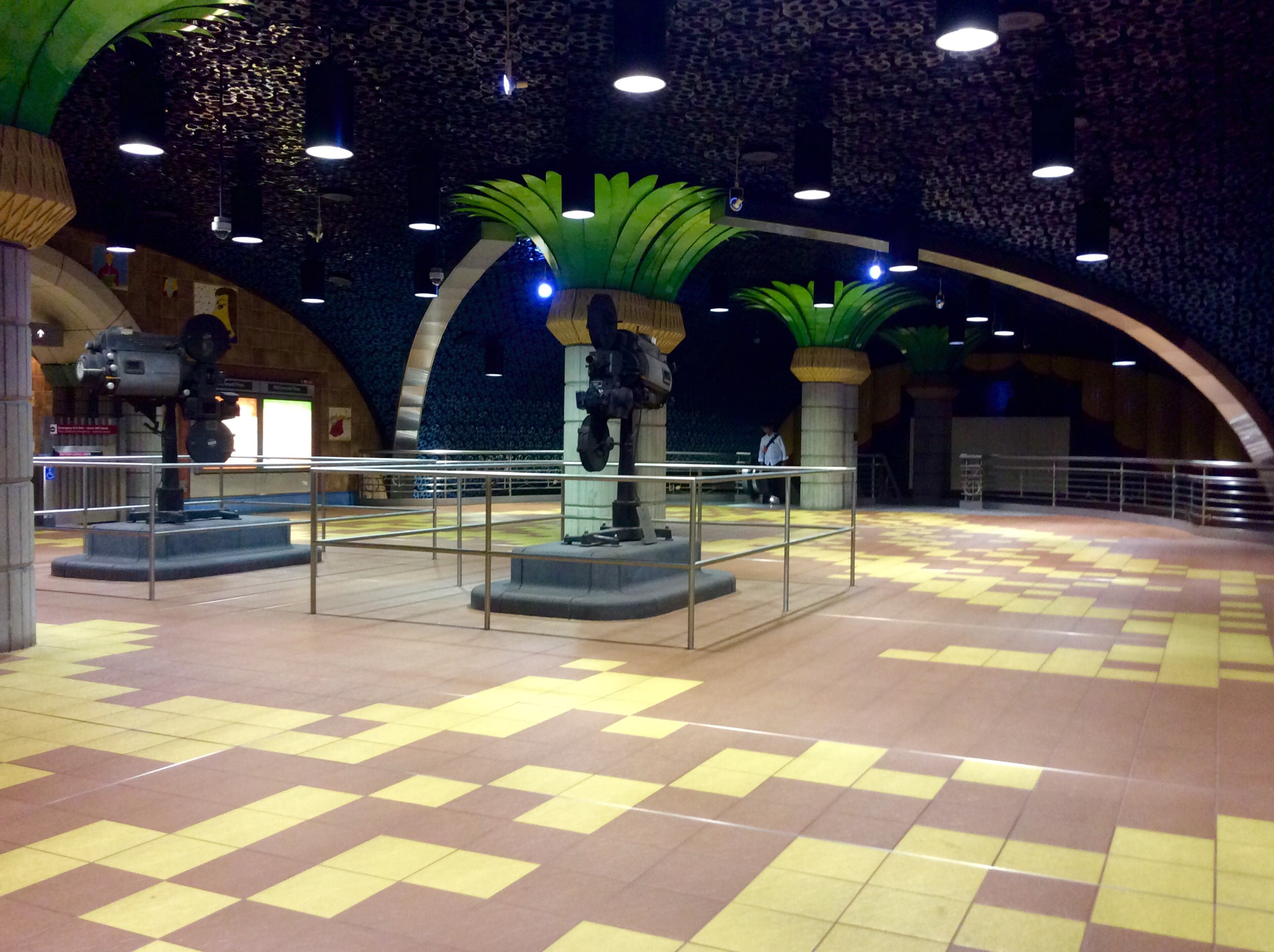
View from the mezzanine level

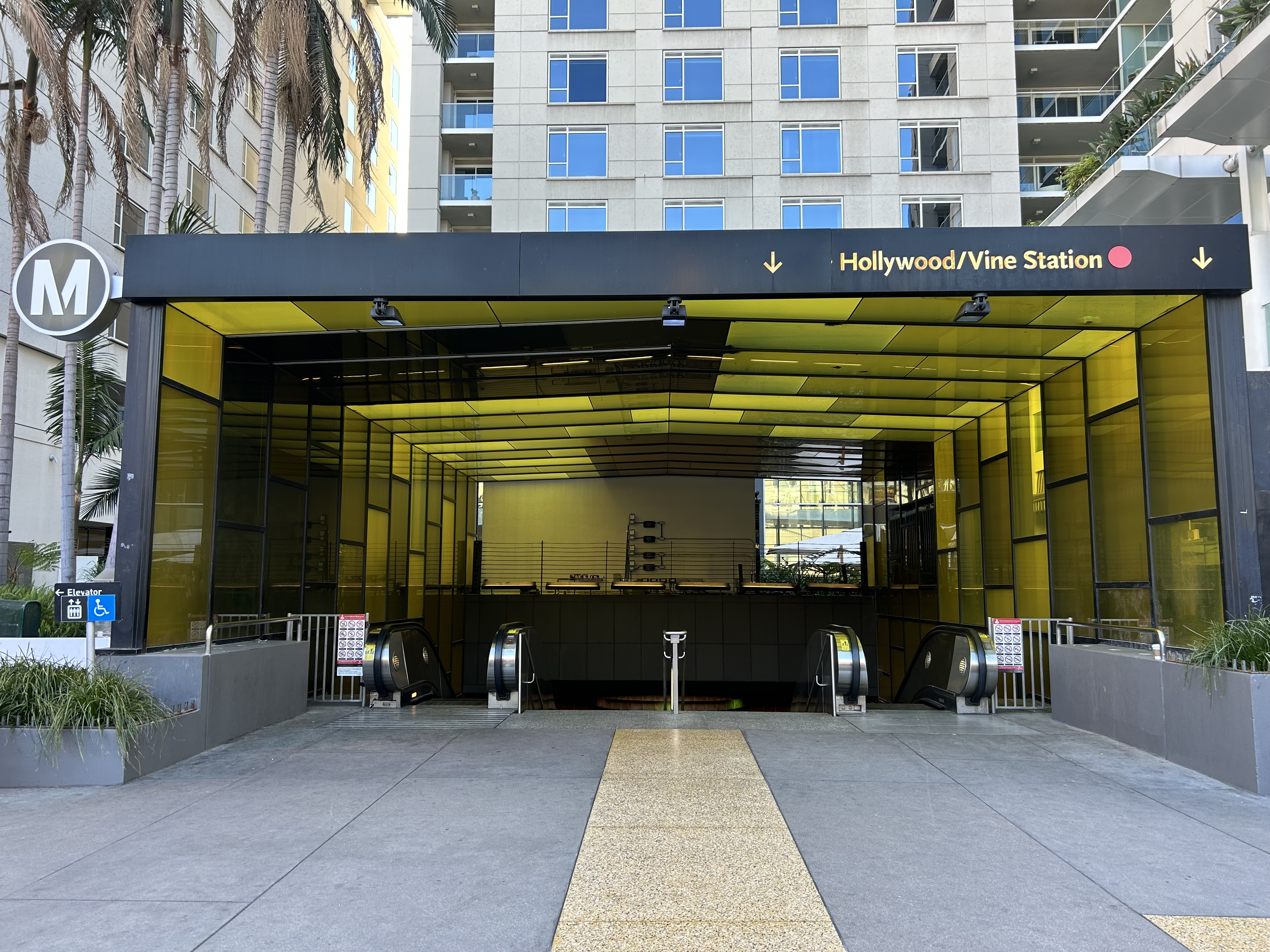
View of the entrance to Hollywood/Vine station

Respected Southern California based architect Adolfo E. Miralles, FAIA was selected to design this landmark station. Each B Line station was assigned a professional artist to design original art. Local Los Angeles Chicano artist Gilbert Luján (aka Magu) was selected to create the artwork for this station. "Light" was one of the central themes of the station because of its pervasiveness in Hollywood, from stars to light that passes through projectors to show films to the sun in sunny southern California. Cultural motifs in the form of So Cal cultural icons are also prevalent throughout the myriad of ceramic tiles lining the walls of the corridors as passengers descend into the railway tunnel. Benches for waiting passengers were fashioned as classic car lowriders on pedestals.

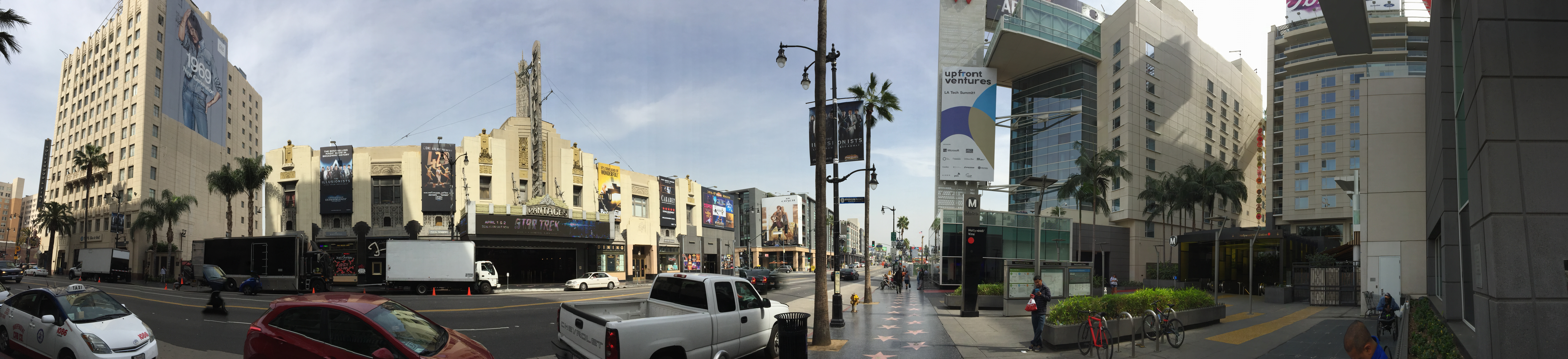
Station head house (at right) and vicinity
