= Western Avenue (Los Angeles) =

Street in Los Angeles County, California

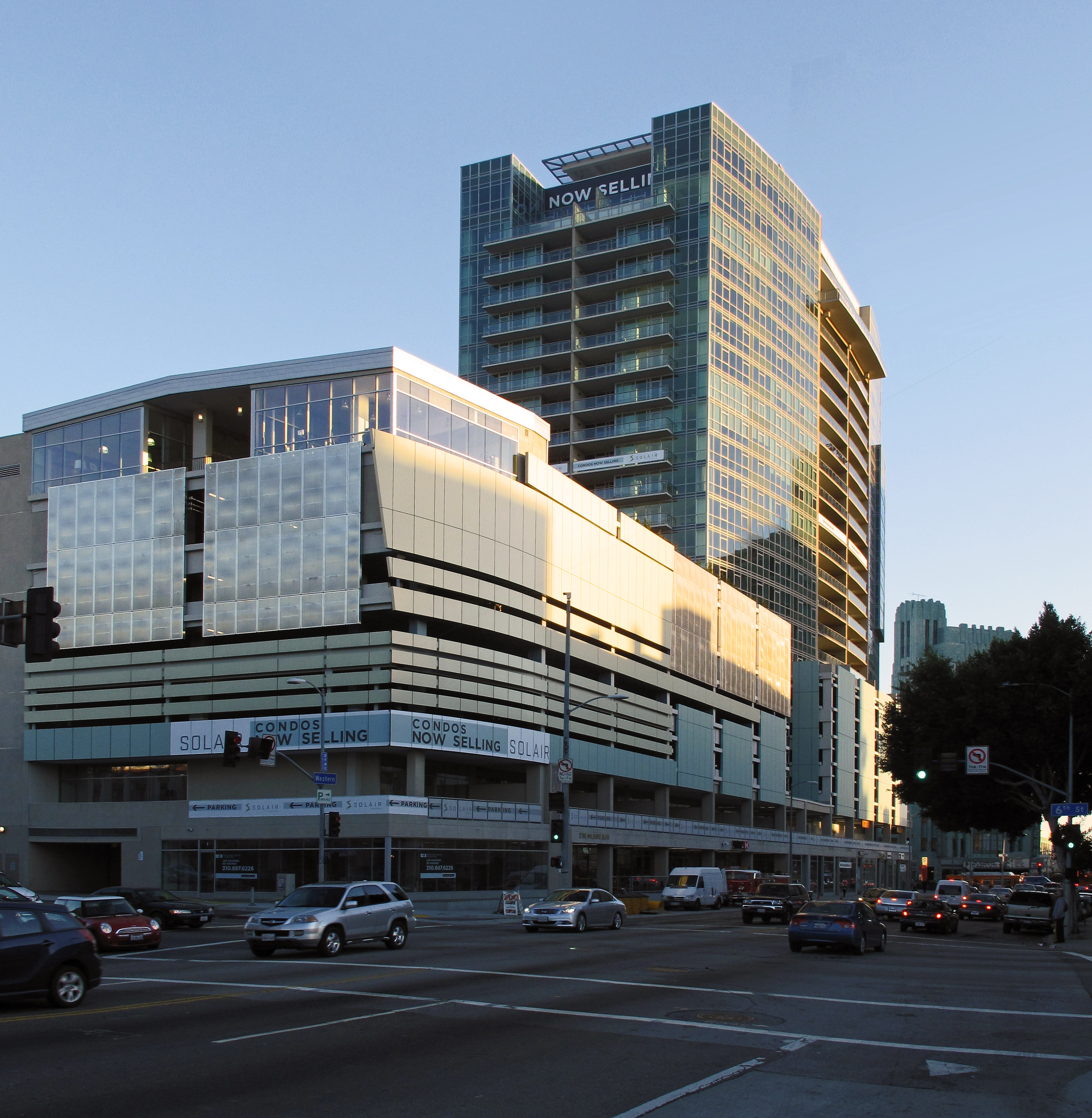
- A transit-oriented development of condominiums, a parking garage, above the D line subway station at Wilshire Boulevard and Western Avenue.
- Part of: SR 213 between 25th Street in San Pedro and I-405 in Torrance
- Maintained by: Bureau of Street Services, City of L.A. DPW
- Length: 29 miles (47 km)
- Location: Los Angeles County, California, United States
- Nearest metro station: : Hollywood/Western; Wilshire/Western; Expo/Western
- South end: Paseo Del Mar in San Pedro
- Major junctions: SR 1 in Harbor City; I-405 in Torrance; I-10 in Jefferson Park; US 101 / SR 2 in Hollywood
- North end: Los Feliz Boulevard in Los Feliz

Western Avenue is a major four-lane street in the city of Los Angeles (west of Downtown) and through the center portion of Los Angeles County, California. At about 29 miles (47 km) in length, it is one of the longest north–south streets in Los Angeles city and county.

== Description ==
Western Avenue passes through a large diversity of residential neighborhoods in Los Angeles County. From the south, where it transitions into Paseo Del Mar near White Point and the Pacific Ocean, it begins in San Pedro, then passes through Rancho Palos Verdes, Harbor City, Lomita, California, Gardena and South Los Angeles. It is also the easternmost border of Torrance.

Around the Pico Boulevard, Olympic Boulevard, and Wilshire Boulevard intersections, Western Avenue passes through Koreatown. Further north, Western Avenue passes through the East Hollywood district. Around the Santa Monica Boulevard, Sunset Boulevard, and Hollywood Boulevard intersections, it passes through the East Hollywood neighborhoods of Little Armenia and Thai Town.

The northern terminus of Western Avenue is north of Franklin Avenue in the Los Feliz district, at the base of the Hollywood Hills. The road curves east becoming Los Feliz Boulevard, a major east/west thoroughfare through Los Feliz to the Golden State Freeway and from there into the city of Glendale.

Another Western Avenue begins north of Griffith Park and is located in the San Fernando Valley area of Glendale. Its southwest terminus is nearly due north of where Los Angeles' Western Avenue transitions into Los Feliz Boulevard.

The California State Legislature has legally designated the segment of Western Avenue from 25th Street in San Pedro north to the San Diego Freeway (Interstate 405) in Torrance as California State Route 213. However, signage and maps may extend the highway south to Paseo del Mar in San Pedro, while Caltrans has not yet adopted the northerly two miles from Carson Street to Interstate 405.

The California State Legislature has also legally designated the segment of Western Avenue from Interstate 405 to the Hollywood Freeway (US Route 101) as California State Route 258, but it remains unsigned and Caltrans has no plans to actually take it over.

== History ==
The street derives its name from its history as the westernmost border of Los Angeles city limits in the 19th century, before annexations in the early 20th century expanded the city westward and onwards.

In 1923, Alejandro Borquez opened the Sonora Cafe on Western. The café, which in 1927 changed its name to El Cholo Spanish Cafe, is credited with the invention of the burrito.

== Public transit ==
=== Metro subway and at-grade stations ===
Western Avenue is served by three Los Angeles Metro Rail stations:

1. Hollywood Boulevard on the B Line
2. Wilshire Boulevard on the D Line
3. Exposition Boulevard on the E Line

=== Metro Local ===
- Metro Local lines 205 and 207, and Gardena Transit line 2 operate on Western Avenue.
- Metro local line 207 runs between Hollywood Boulevard and Imperial Highway.
- Gardena Line 2 runs between Imperial Highway and Pacific Coast Highway
- Metro line 205 runs between Pacific Coast Highway and 1st Street in San Pedro.
