= C. H. Baker =

Defunct chain of shoe stores based in Los Angeles

C. H. Baker was a chain of shoe stores that operated in Greater Los Angeles and elsewhere on the West Coast from 1904 through about 1991.

== Charles Harris Baker (1869–1939) ==
The stores were founded by Charles Harris Baker (b. Dec. 23, 1869, Martin County, Indiana, moved to Los Angeles in 1880 and Pasadena in 1889, died in an auto accident August 22, 1939, Pasadena, California) In about 1898, Baker started as an employee in Hamilton's shoe store in Los Angeles at a salary of $12 per week. He began his shoe business around 1900, initially or at some point as a partnership, Hamilton & Baker.

== C. H. Baker stores ==
In 1904, the partnership with Hamilton was dissolved, and C. H. Baker took over the business, then located at 239 S. Spring St., the central shopping district of Los Angeles at that time.

By 1928, C. H. Baker had 13 stores: 4 in central Los Angeles, one in Hollywood and Pasadena, 4 in San Francisco, and 3 in Portland, Oregon. Their stores were located in most major malls in Southern California until about 1991.

In 1939, Harris died in a car crash, and his son John Harris Baker managed the chain, which at that time had stores in 10 communities.

== Hollywood store ==
In 1923, C. H. Baker opened a store at 6664 Hollywood Boulevard, at that time the second-most-important shopping district in Los Angeles after Broadway and Seventh Streets in Downtown Los Angeles. That store had more demand for the latest fashions; its sales were about $100,000 the first year and $400,000 annually in 1928.
