= West Los Angeles VA Medical Center =

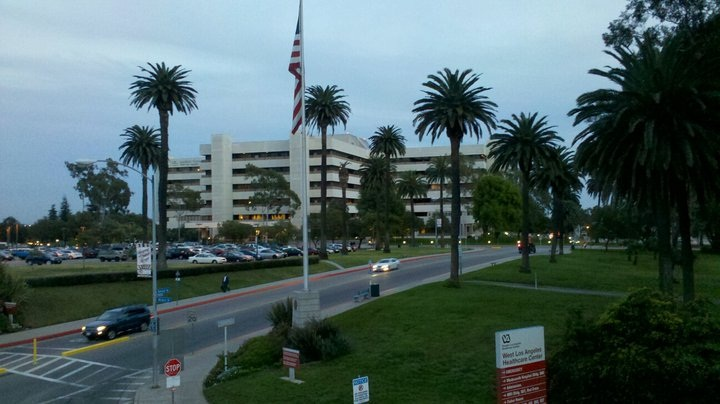

Geography
- Location: 11301 Wilshire Boulevard; Los Angeles, California 90073, Los Angeles, California, United States
- Coordinates: 34°3′0″N 118°27′9″W

Organization
- Type: Veterans

Links
- Website: www.losangeles.va.gov
- Lists: Hospitals in California

The West Los Angeles Veterans Affairs Medical Center is among a network of housing, shelter, utilities, food preparation facilities and a hospital mandated to permanently serve veterans at the West Los Angeles VA Soldiers Home. The approximately 400 remaining acres of the Soldiers Home is located adjacent to the West Los Angeles, Westwood and Brentwood neighborhoods of Los Angeles, has its own ZIP code and accounts for most of the over $1,100,000,000 Greater Los Angeles VA Healthcare System's annual federal budget. Operated by the Veterans Health Administration, the West Los Angeles VA Soldiers Home is the first U.S. government facility for homeless Veterans and the only one it permanently maintains in public trust to house them.

== History ==
The medical facility, which sits on land donated by Arcadia Bandini de Stearns Baker in 1887, was previously known as the Sawtelle Veterans Home. This became the Wadsworth Hospital in 1927 and was rebuilt in 1977 into the present modern building.

In 2011 a group of homeless veterans sued the center, claiming that the VA was renting land in the center for commercial gain and ignoring the needs of homeless veterans for housing. In 2015, as part of the settlement of the 2011 lawsuit, the Department of Veterans Affairs released a draft master plan for the future of the campus.

In 2016, the Department of Veterans Affairs announced a plan to add 1,200 units of housing for homeless veterans to the hospital campus.

The Metro D Line is being extended from Koreatown's Wilshire/Western station to the new Westwood/VA Hospital station, as part of Section 3 of the D Line Extension. This station will be located north of the hospital between Bonsall Ave., Wilshire Blvd. and I-405, and will open in 2027.

=== Land misuse lawsuits ===
A portion of land of the center has been leased by the VA to external organizations for purposes unrelated to veterans affairs, including UCLA for a baseball stadium, Brentwood School, a television studio for storage, and a laundry service. A series of lawsuits beginning in 2011 has argued these leases defy the conditions of the 1887 land donation from Arcadia Bandini de Stearns Baker and Senator John P. Jones stipulating that the land be used as "...a branch home for disabled volunteer soldiers..."

== Gallery ==
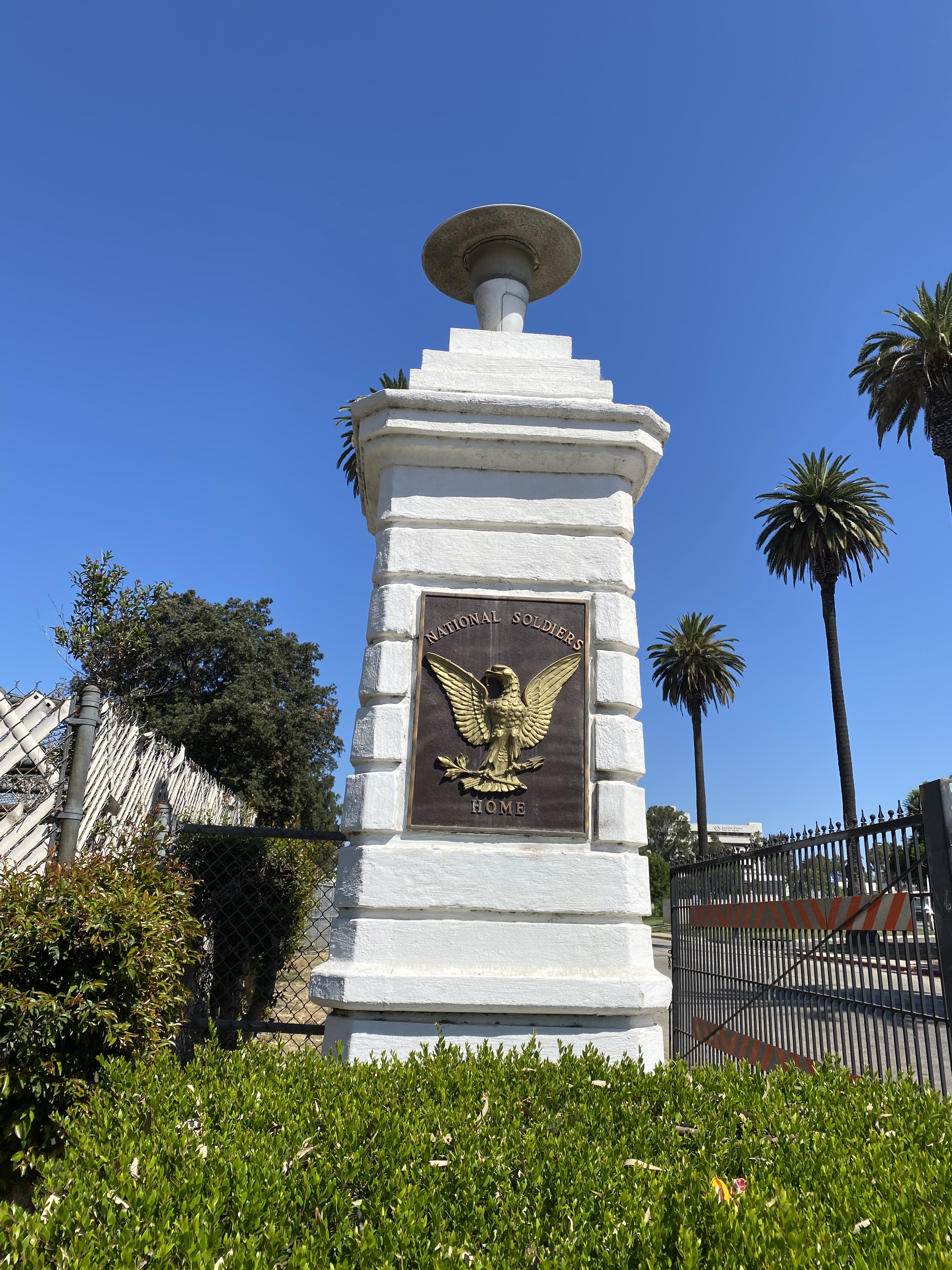
Entry gate off Sawtelle Boulevard

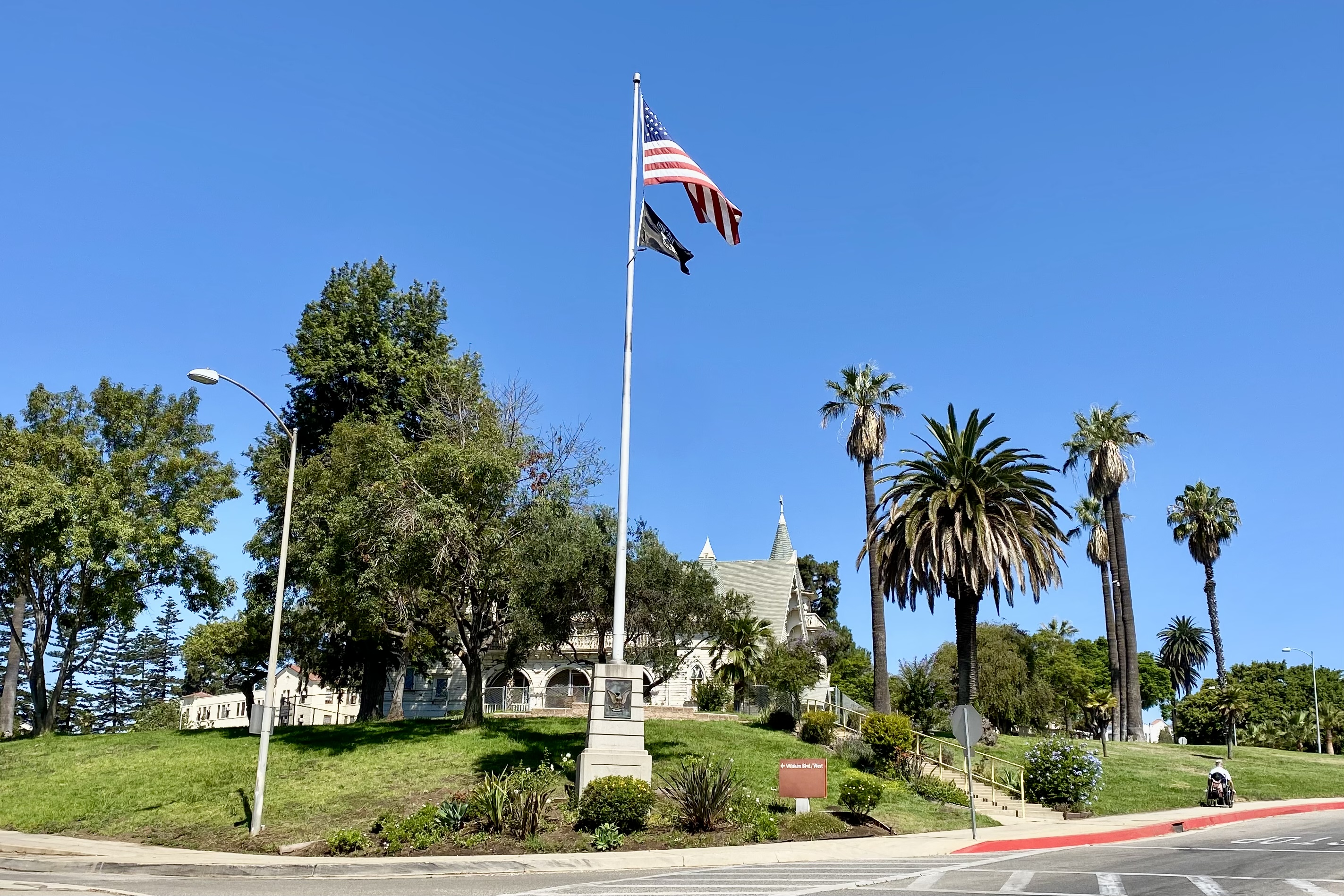
Entry near Wilshire Boulevard

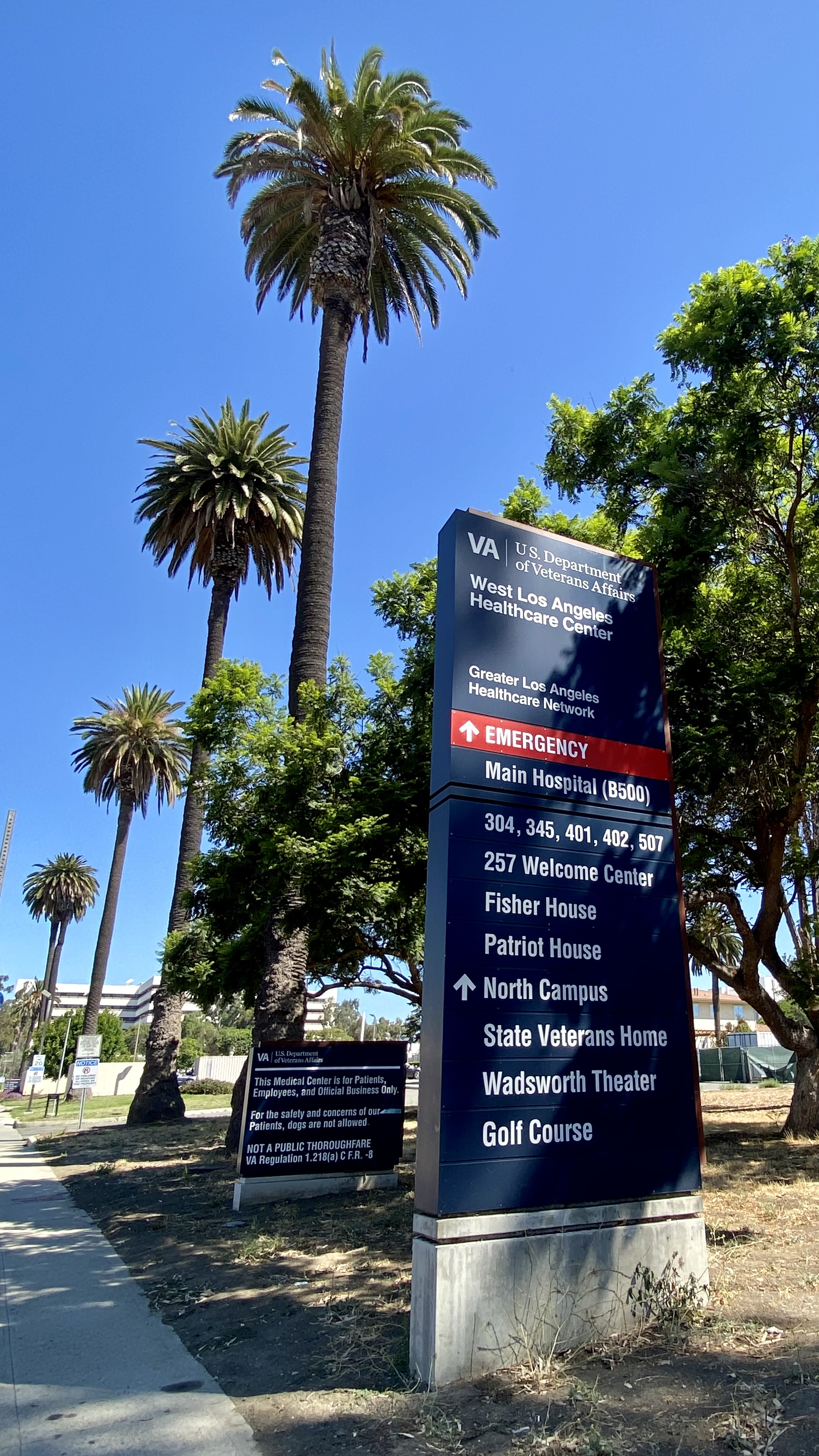
Directional signs, Veterans Home and Hospital, west Los Angeles, California

== See also ==
Besides the hospital, other sites of interest at West Los Angeles VA Soldiers Home and adjacent federally owned, unincorporated land in the area of Sawtelle, Westwood and Brentwood:

- Wadsworth Chapel
- Wadsworth Theater
- Streetcar Depot, West Los Angeles
- Los Angeles National Cemetery
- Wilshire Federal Building
- Westwood/VA Hospital station
- Jackie Robinson Stadium
