= D Line Extension =

Rapid transit construction project in Los Angeles, California

D Line Subway Extension
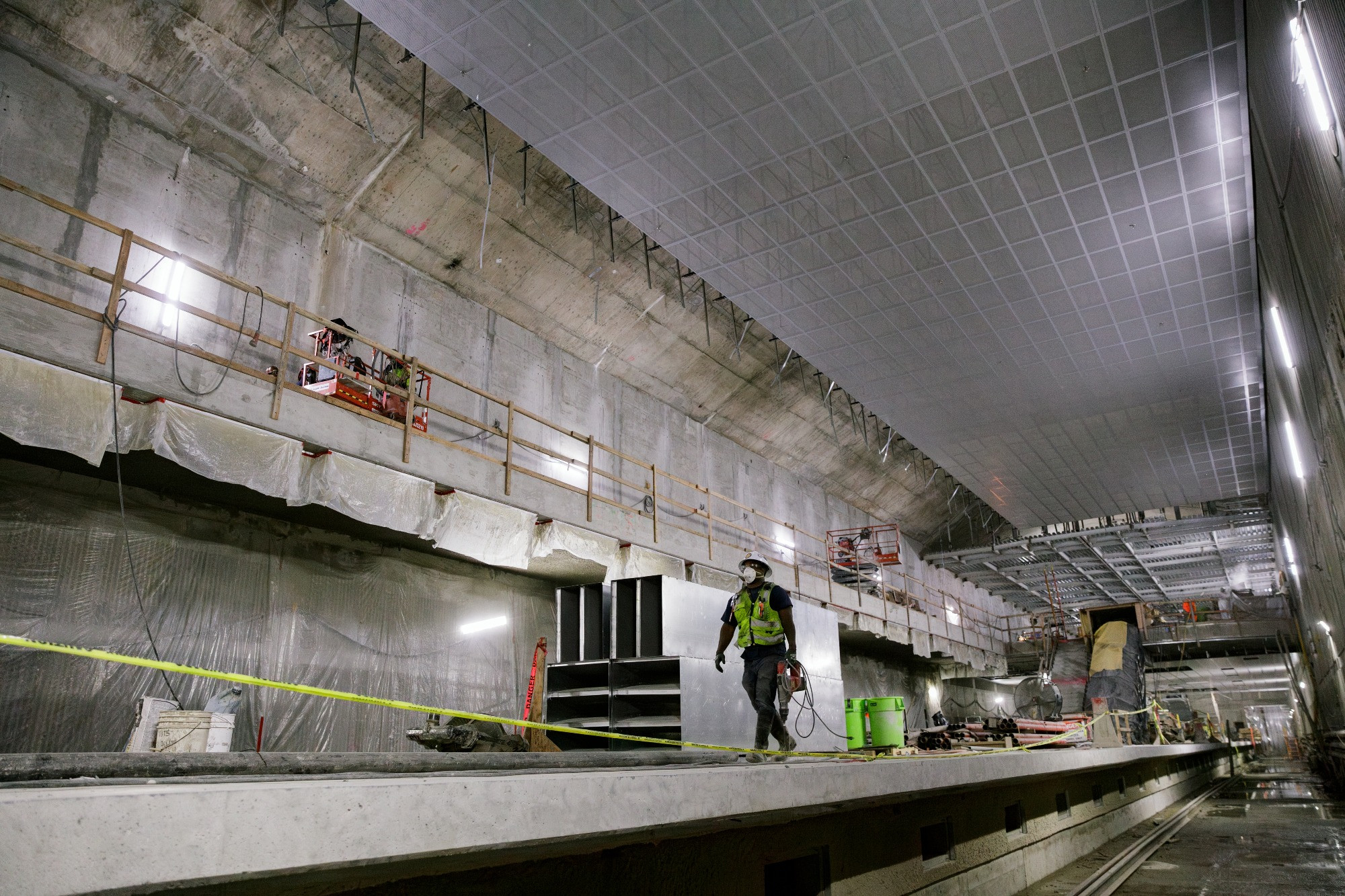
- The interior of Beverly Drive station, under construction in July 2025.

Overview
- Status: Section 1: Open; Sections 2 and 3: Under construction
- Locale: Mid-Wilshire, Westwood, Century City, Los Angeles and Beverly Hills
- Termini: Wilshire/La Cienega (current); Westwood/VA Hospital (future)
- Stations: 7
- Website: metro.net/projects/westside

Service
- Type: Rapid transit
- System: Los Angeles Metro Rail
- Operator: Los Angeles Metro

History
- Planned opening: 2027; 1 year's time (Sections 2 and 3)
- Opened: May 8, 2026; 5 months ago (Section 1)

Technical
- Line length: 3.9 mi (6.3 km) (Section 1); 2.6 mi (4.2 km) (Section 2); 2.6 mi (4.2 km) (Section 3)
- Number of tracks: 2
- Track gauge: 4 ft 8 1/2 in (1,435 mm) standard gauge
Route map
Section 1 highlighted in red, 2 in green, 3 in blue

The D Line Subway Extension (formerly known as the Westside Subway Extension, the Subway to the Sea, and the Purple Line Extension) is a construction project in Los Angeles County, California, extending the rapid transit D Line (formerly the Purple Line) of the Los Angeles Metro Rail system from its former terminus at Wilshire/Western in Koreatown, Los Angeles, to the Westside region. The project is being supervised by Los Angeles Metro. The subway has been given high priority by Metro in its long-range plans, and funding for the project was included in two county sales tax measures, Measure R and Measure M.

The project's draft environmental impact statement was completed in September 2010, and a locally preferred alternative was selected in October 2010. Metro released the D Line (then the Purple Line) Extension's final environmental impact report in 2012. The entire project was approved at the Metro Board of Directors meeting on April 26, 2012, and construction has been separated into three sections.

This project's second and third sections are under construction. Combined, these three sections will add 9.1 miles (14.6 km) of heavy rail service to the cities of Los Angeles and Beverly Hills. Construction on Section 1, between the existing Wilshire/Western station and the planned Wilshire/La Cienega station, started on November 11, 2014. Section 2 pre-construction work between Wilshire/La Cienega station and Century City station began in April 2017, and the official Section 2 groundbreaking ceremony took place on February 23, 2018. Section 3 advanced utility relocation pre-groundbreaking work began in February 2018 for the future Westwood/UCLA and Westwood/VA Hospital stations. The Section 3 groundbreaking ceremony took place on May 24, 2021. Tunneling for the project was completed on April 2, 2024. Section 1 opened on May 8, 2026.

A fourth section has long been discussed, which would extend the D Line from the Westwood/VA Hospital station 3.5 miles (5.6 km) under Wilshire Boulevard to Santa Monica beach, terminating at or near the E Line or future Lincoln Boulevard Transit Corridor terminus.

To bring awareness to the opening of Section 1, Metro released Ride the D T-shirts, which quickly went viral.

== Overview ==
The Los Angeles Metro is the public transportation agency of Los Angeles County, California. It operates a rail network, comprising four light rail lines (A, C, E, and K lines) and two subway lines (B and D lines).

The D Line, which runs between Beverly Hills and Downtown Los Angeles, is the shortest of the six lines at a length of 9 miles (14 km). The subway was originally planned to extend under Wilshire Boulevard, one of the city's busiest thoroughfares, but a 1985 methane explosion at a Ross Dress for Less clothing store near Fairfax gave Rep. Henry Waxman, who represented the Fairfax District, a reason to derail the project that was opposed by his constituents by prohibiting tunneling in an alleged "methane zone" west along Wilshire. The main branch of the subway (today's B Line) was built up Vermont Avenue and Hollywood Boulevard, with a short stub line (today's D Line) extending out Wilshire only to Western Avenue.

Demands for an extension of the line past Western grew along with traffic in the area and the expansion of the system elsewhere in the region, and in 2005, Waxman championed the reversal of his own legislation. The highly anticipated project to extend the D Line westward was approved in 2012, and construction on the first of three sections began in 2014. Section 1, the segment between Wilshire/Western station in Koreatown and Wilshire/La Cienega station in Beverly Hills, opened on May 8, 2026.

Currently, the line is planned to run between Wilshire/Western and Westwood/VA Hospital, with tail tracks that could allow for future expansion farther west. The following new subway stations will be built:

- Section 1 (2026)
  - Wilshire/La Brea
  - Wilshire/Fairfax
  - Wilshire/La Cienega
- Section 2 (2027)
  - Beverly Drive
  - Century City
- Section 3 (2027)
  - Westwood/UCLA
  - Westwood/VA Hospital

== History ==
=== Early concepts ===
Early transit planners recognized the importance of Wilshire Boulevard as a spine and key boulevard in Los Angeles. Early plans for regional Metro Rail envisioned a rapid-transit route between Downtown and the Westside, with a branch going north on Fairfax to Hollywood and into the San Fernando Valley. In 1961, the "New Proposed Backbone Route Plan" described a subway along Wilshire Boulevard from Westwood to Downtown (and then elevated to El Monte). This project was never funded. Ballot initiatives in 1968 and 1974 to build a subway to West Los Angeles were rejected by voters, but in 1980 voters passed Proposition A, which created a half-cent county sales tax to fund rail construction. Ultimately, the Southern California Rapid Transit District (SCRTD), one of Metro's predecessors, planned a subway that would extend from Downtown Los Angeles to Fairfax Avenue, then north on Fairfax to Hollywood and the San Fernando Valley. Due to the "methane zone" (see below) that plan was modified, and Vermont Avenue was chosen for the north–south route instead of Fairfax.

=== Prior opposition and halt of Wilshire branch ===
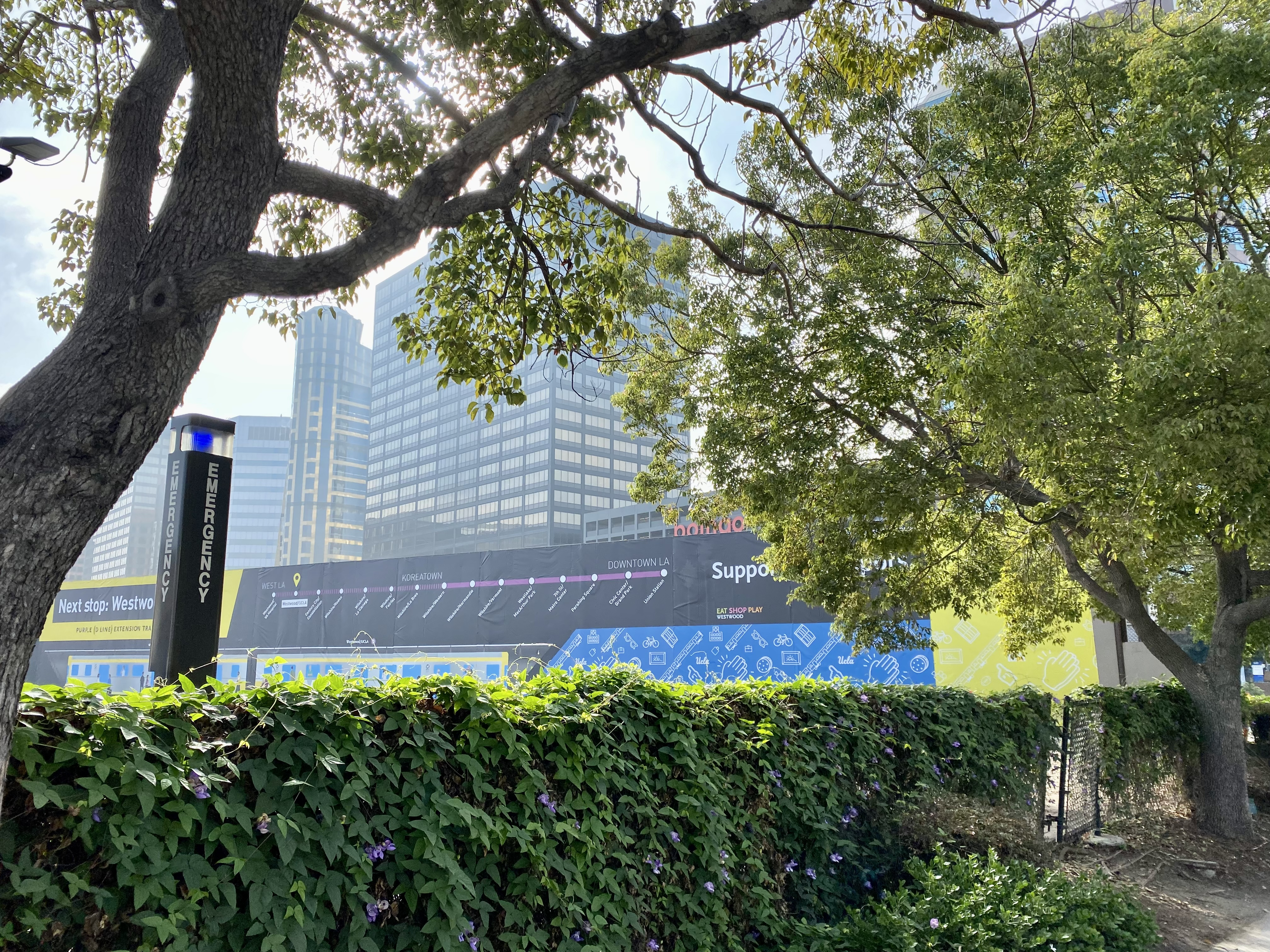
Photo of Metro construction signage from Veteran along Wilshire in Westwood (2022)

Several factors led to the eventual halt of plans to extend the subway west along Wilshire Boulevard. For decades, the route was mired in political and socioeconomic debate, with politicians giving vent to anti-subway sentiments and NIMBY isolationism. The City of Beverly Hills also opposed the subway, as did two critical legislators from the area: Congressman Henry Waxman and Los Angeles City Councilman Zev Yaroslavsky.

Following a methane explosion in 1985 at a Ross Dress for Less clothing store near Fairfax and Third Street, Congressman Waxman worked to legally designate a large part of Mid-Wilshire as a "methane zone." This zone stretched on either side of Wilshire Boulevard from Hancock Park to the west of Fairfax (through areas of his district where subway opposition was strongest). Waxman was able to pass federal legislation banning all tunneling through this zone. Subsequently, any plans for a subway west of Western Avenue diverted the line south around the methane zone, using Crenshaw, Pico, and San Vicente Boulevards. These plans never came to fruition, and to qualify for federal funding, the SCRTD started anew and rerouted the subway north on Vermont Avenue, then traveled west under Hollywood Boulevard and then north toward the Valley. The Red Line was completed in 2000.

The Red Line project (including the present-day B Line and D Line corridors) began in 1986. Soon after construction began, the project began to draw considerable bad press. Access to many local businesses was blocked for weeks, causing some small businesses to shut down. Disagreements arose between Metro and Tutor-Saliba (general contractor on the project) over tens of millions of dollars in cost overruns. A sinkhole in Hollywood seemed to symbolize the disastrous nature of the subway project. in 1998, voters approved a measure sponsored by County Supervisor Yaroslavsky that banned use of Proposition A and Prop C sales tax funds for any subway tunneling in the county. This effectively ended any chance of a Westside Subway in the foreseeable future.

The segment of the Red Line project (since renamed the Purple, then D Line) to Wilshire/Western was completed and began service in 1996.

=== New support and approval ===
In 2000, an urban art group called Heavy Trash placed signs advertising a fictional "Aqua Line." The signs, with the text "Coming Soon," showed a subway route extending along Wilshire to the ocean, with 10 station stops. Although the campaign was a hoax, it demonstrated newfound support and revealed the frustrations surrounding the lack of a subway connecting Santa Monica and the Westside with Downtown Los Angeles. The name "Aqua Line" was later repurposed as the proposed name for the Expo Line.

During the 2000s, support for the subway began to materialize, largely due to the massive impact of traffic on Wilshire Boulevard and throughout the region. The Metro Rapid bus line that currently operates along Wilshire Blvd. runs at capacity. In 2005, Los Angeles voters elected Antonio Villaraigosa mayor of Los Angeles. In his campaign and after the election, Villaraigosa declared an extension of a subway line to Santa Monica a major priority, offering visionary slogans such as "subway to the sea," "the most utilized subway in the nation, maybe the world," and "the most cost-effective public-transportation project in America." As mayor, Villaraigosa served several one-year-long terms as Metro Board chairman.

In December 2005, Congressman Henry Waxman, who had sponsored the "methane zone" tunneling ban 20 years earlier, championed the reversal of his legislation upon a committee's assertion that tunneling through the methane zone was now safe. To make this happen, Waxman introduced new congressional legislation (H.R. 4653) to overturn the ban.

In July 2006, the Metro board approved staff and funding to initiate a Major Investment Study (MIS) to study the corridor west of Western Avenue for a possible subway extension. In the following month, the Metro Board voted to designate the Wilshire branch of the Red Line, between Union Station and Wilshire/Western station, as the Purple Line.

With a new name and a new study initiated, the Purple Line Extension began to receive public support from several organizations. In 2006, the Westside Cities Council of Governments endorsed the extension. In September 2006, both Cedars-Sinai Medical Center and UCLA joined the council's Mass Transit Committee to advocate for the subway extension. In 2007, the Beverly Hills City Council endorsed a Wilshire alignment that includes one station at the corner of Wilshire and La Cienega boulevards and another on Wilshire Boulevard between Beverly Drive and Rodeo Drive.

On June 28, 2007, the Metro board approved a $3.6 million contract with Parsons Brinckerhoff to provide an Alternatives Analysis (AA), an assessment of tunnel feasibility, and conceptual engineering with options for future preliminary engineering and environmental clearance for this extension.

Congressmember Henry Waxman's legislation to lift the ban on tunneling through the "methane zone" finally became law in December 2007 as part of the 2008 omnibus spending bill. The passage of this long-awaited legislation allowed, for the first time in two decades, the planning and building of a westward extension of the subway.

In 2009, the Wilshire Subway Extension was included in Metro's Long Range Transportation Plan, and environmental studies were begun.

=== Environmental review process ===
==== Initial alternatives analysis ====
A map of Metro Rail lines and projects as of August 2023. The route of the D Line extension is in dotted purple.

During the alternatives analysis, many alternatives were considered. These included different alignments and several modes of transit (heavy rail, light rail, bus rapid transit and monorail). Most alignments were variations/combinations of two primary alignments: the "Wilshire alignment" and the "West Hollywood alignment."

- The Wilshire alignment has been suggested as a corridor to the Westside for decades. Wilshire Boulevard has many destinations along its path, including Miracle Mile, Beverly Hills and Century City. The route heads west from Wilshire/Western primarily along Wilshire Boulevard until it reaches Santa Monica Boulevard. At that point, the route diverts through Century City before returning to Wilshire in Westwood.
- The West Hollywood alignment (sometimes known as the "Pink Line") was proposed during the public scoping process. The route travels along Santa Monica Boulevard and San Vicente Boulevard, connecting Hollywood/Highland in the north to the Wilshire route in the south. The West Hollywood route generated considerable support from the public, transit advocates, and the City of West Hollywood.

Other alignments studied involved various deviations from Wilshire Boulevard to allow service to destinations such as Beverly Center, Cedars-Sinai Medical Center, and Farmers Market.

The alternatives analysis recommended further study on four alternatives: "No Build," TSM (Transportation Systems Management), the Wilshire Alternative, and a combination Wilshire/West Hollywood Alternative. Both build alternatives use heavy rail (HRT) as their transit mode, primarily because this would allow interconnection to the existing Metro Rail subway system. All proposed alignments involving other transit modes (monorail, LRT, and BRT) were eliminated.

==== DEIR alternatives ====
The five alternatives considered in the draft environmental impact report were:

DEIR alternative	Description	New trips (daily)	Estimated cost (billions)
Alternative 1	Wilshire route to UCLA	24,142	$4.036
Alternative 2	Wilshire route to VA	27,615	$4.358
Alternative 3	Wilshire route to Santa Monica	35,235	$6.116
Alternative 4	Wilshire route to VA, plus West Hollywood route	31,224	$6.985
Alternative 5	Wilshire route to Santa Monica, plus West Hollywood route	40,123	$8.747

Alternatives 3 and 5 are the build alternatives carried over from the alternatives analysis (AA). In addition, three new alternatives (Alternatives 1, 2, and 4) were added. These new alternatives are variations of the two AA-recommended alternatives which all stop short of Santa Monica. They were added to reflect the realities of limited available funds and the priorities in Metro's Long Range Transportation Plan (LRTP).

The following table shows all proposed potential metro stations and the alternatives for which they applied:

Station	Alt 1	Alt 2	Alt 3	Alt 4	Alt 5
Wilshire/Crenshaw	check	check	check	check	check
Wilshire/La Brea	check	check	check	check	check
Wilshire/Fairfax	check	check	check	check	check
Wilshire/La Cienega	check	check	check	check	check
Wilshire/Rodeo	check	check	check	check	check
Century City	check	check	check	check	check
Westwood/UCLA	check	check	check	check	check
Westwood/VA Hospital	-	check	check	check	check
Wilshire/Bundy	-	-	check	-	check
Wilshire/26th Street	-	-	check	-	check
Wilshire/16th Street	-	-	check	-	check
Wilshire/4th Street	-	-	check	-	check
Santa Monica/La Brea	-	-	-	check	check
Santa Monica/Fairfax	-	-	-	check	check
Santa Monica/San Vicente	-	-	-	check	check
Beverly Center	-	-	-	check	check

In addition to the five build alternatives, the DEIR identified six sets of options:

Name	Issue	Options
Option 1	Should a station be built at Wilshire/Crenshaw?	Yes; No
Option 2	Where should the Wilshire/Fairfax station be located?	Slightly west of the intersection; Under intersection
Option 3	Where should the Wilshire/La Cienega station be located?	East of intersection; West of intersection
Option 4	Which route should be used between Wilshire/Rodeo and Century City stations?	"Santa Monica Blvd" alignment; "Constellation North" alignment; "Constellation South" alignment
Option 4	Where should the Century City station be located?	Santa Monica Blvd.; Constellation Blvd.
Option 4	Which route should be used between Century City and Westwood/UCLA stations?	"East" alignment; "Central" alignment; "West" alignment
Option 5	Where should the Westwood/UCLA station be located?	Wilshire/Gayley; Wilshire/Westwood
Option 6	Where should the Westwood/VA Hospital station be located?	South of Wilshire; North of Wilshire

=== Route selection: Alternative 2 ===
In September 2010, Metro published the project's draft environmental impact statement. The report made no specific recommendation among the five alternatives. However, Metro staff did signal that only Alternatives 1 and 2 would be serious candidates for the Locally Preferred Alternative since only those two alternatives match the project scope defined in Measure R and Metro's Long Range Transportation Plan (LRTP).

In October 2010, Metro staff recommended continuing the study on Alternative 2. Staff also recommended:

- Crenshaw station: delete.
- Wilshire/Fairfax station: build east station option.
- La Cienega station: build east station option.
- West Hollywood connection structure: delete.
- Century City station:
  - continue to study both Santa Monica and Constellation station options.
  - continue to study Constellation North and Santa Monica alignment options between Beverly Hills and Century City.
  - continue to study only the East alignment option between Century City and Westwood.
- Westwood/UCLA station: continue to study both Wilshire/Westwood and Wilshire/Gayley station options.
- Westwood/VA Hospital station: continue to study both VA Hospital North and VA Hospital South station options.
- Storage and Maintenance Facility: expand existing Division 20 facility.

In eliminating the West Hollywood connection structure, Metro staff eliminated the future possibility of a West Hollywood line as a heavy-rail branch of the Wilshire Subway, as described in Alternatives 4 and 5. Staff cited the $135 million cost and lower-than-expected performance and cost-effectiveness. Staff left open the possibility of other future alternatives which would not require a connection structure, such as light rail, with a possible future extension south of Wilshire on San Vicente Boulevard, connecting to a future extension of the K Line that would run north of Exposition Boulevard.

Due to protests from Beverly Hills residents and local officials, the Metro Board approved an amendment requesting a detailed study and comparison of the two Century City station options in the FEIR. Metro eventually chose the Century City station location of Constellation Boulevard and Avenue of the Stars intersection, displeasing Beverly Hills and its school district as the route traveled under Beverly Hills High School. They preferred the Santa Monica Boulevard and Avenue of the Stars intersection. Metro argued earthquake faults and abutting a golf course made the location undesirable and would be under-served. After legal battles and court hearings, Metro prevailed, proving the DEIR was correct. At the Metro Board meeting in late October 2010, the Metro Board certified the DEIR and accepted the staff recommendation as the Locally Preferred Alternative (LPA). A Metro presentation dated October 29, 2013, shows the approved route to the Westwood Veteran's Administration Medical Center and the Section 1 segment to La Cienega had commenced. This presentation also shows construction methods and timelines for all three sections.

=== Project budget and planning ===
The project's estimated costs have increased since it was first proposed in the 1950s. Metro proposed Measure R in 2008; estimated costs in 2008 exceeded Metro's funds available, so they decided to promote the passage of heavy rail to Westwood and dropped the use of the locally used term "Subway to the Sea". This was done to lower costs, raise public awareness to help pass Measure R, serve Central LA, and connect Century City to downtown LA. The Expo Line, now the E Line to Santa Monica beach was under construction then, and Metro didn't want to promote two lines to Santa Monica as they needed countywide support for passage.

Metro estimated in the late 2000s the entire project would cost $4.2 billion (2008 dollars). After the passage of the Measure R sales tax in 2008, an additional $4.074 billion was added to its construction funds. In 2016, LA County voters passed Measure M and funds were appropriated to accelerate the project.

Metro estimates that the three-section project, adding 9 miles of track and 7 new stations, will cost $8.2 billion. Metro has received over half of its funds from "New Starts" grants and low-interest loans from the federal government.

According to the accelerated schedule after Measure M, the full extension would ultimately be opened in three segments as follows:

- 2026: open to La Cienega;
- 2026: open to Century City;
- 2027: open to Westwood/VA.

Funding was sought to accelerate the project's timeline further as officials prefer to open all stations before the start of the 2028 Summer Olympics and Paralympic Games, which Los Angeles won the rights to host on September 13, 2017.

=== Opposition ===
BHUSD Board of Education President Lisa Korbatov objected to the placement of the subway tunnel underneath Beverly Hills High School between the Wilshire/Rodeo and Century City stations, noting that the district had planned to construct new buildings and a below-ground parking lot precisely where the tunnel would impact the high school's property.

Metro chose a route placing the Century City station at Constellation Boulevard instead of Santa Monica Boulevard due to lower ridership projections adjacent to the Los Angeles Country Club and an earthquake fault zone in the latter area. Korbatov claimed that Metro did not adequately study the route to the Constellation Boulevard station and said it could pose a safety risk to students, citing no sources. She also pointed out that the subway tunnel would prevent BHUSD from carrying out many of its long-range construction plans. The school district and city filed a lawsuit in July 2012 against Metro.

In April 2014, Los Angeles County Superior Court Judge ruled that Metro had properly conducted environmental studies under the California Environmental Quality Act. A transit hearing under the requirements of the Public Utilities Code. BHUSD and Beverly Hills interest groups, after spending $10 million on the lawsuit through August 2017, lost the appeal to prevent Metro from contracting with the FTA for the subway project. The school district and city appealed the decision to the California Courts of Appeal and lost again, with the courts citing that Metro complied.

On January 26, 2018, BHUSD again submitted a lawsuit against the FTA and Metro for them to conduct another environmental study for health reasons and prohibit the FTA from granting federal funds to the project until the agencies had fully complied with federal law. BHUSD alleged in June 2018 that Purple Line construction in Century Park East property was affecting their property. Metro responded they were complying with their compact agreement made before construction. Metro's response to the new lawsuit stated they had complied and the supplemental environmental in Beverly Hills and the Century City station met all legal requirements. That additional analysis confirmed they could safely build the project, including the portion beneath Beverly Hills High School. As recently as October 2018, Lisa Korbatov and other members of the BHUSD maintained the district was continuing their litigious action against Metro and the Purple Line Extension construction project. In June 2019, the lawsuit was placed on hold by a local district court judge. No actions were taken, stating it is in "Abeyance." BHUSD was requesting mediation. Metro had declined mediation in the past, citing they had always complied with the DEIR/EIR results and previous environmental review studies added by the courts. In May 2020, the courts again sided with Metro, citing that "Metro satisfied the obligation and that their determination was not arbitrary or capricious," ending the lawsuit. Work continued on the subway extension, and Metro reported it had not affected their timeline for completion. They reported that it was "on time and on budget."

Over the course of its unsuccessful litigation against Metro, BHUSD spent over $16 million in school district bond money.

== Construction ==
=== Section 1 ===
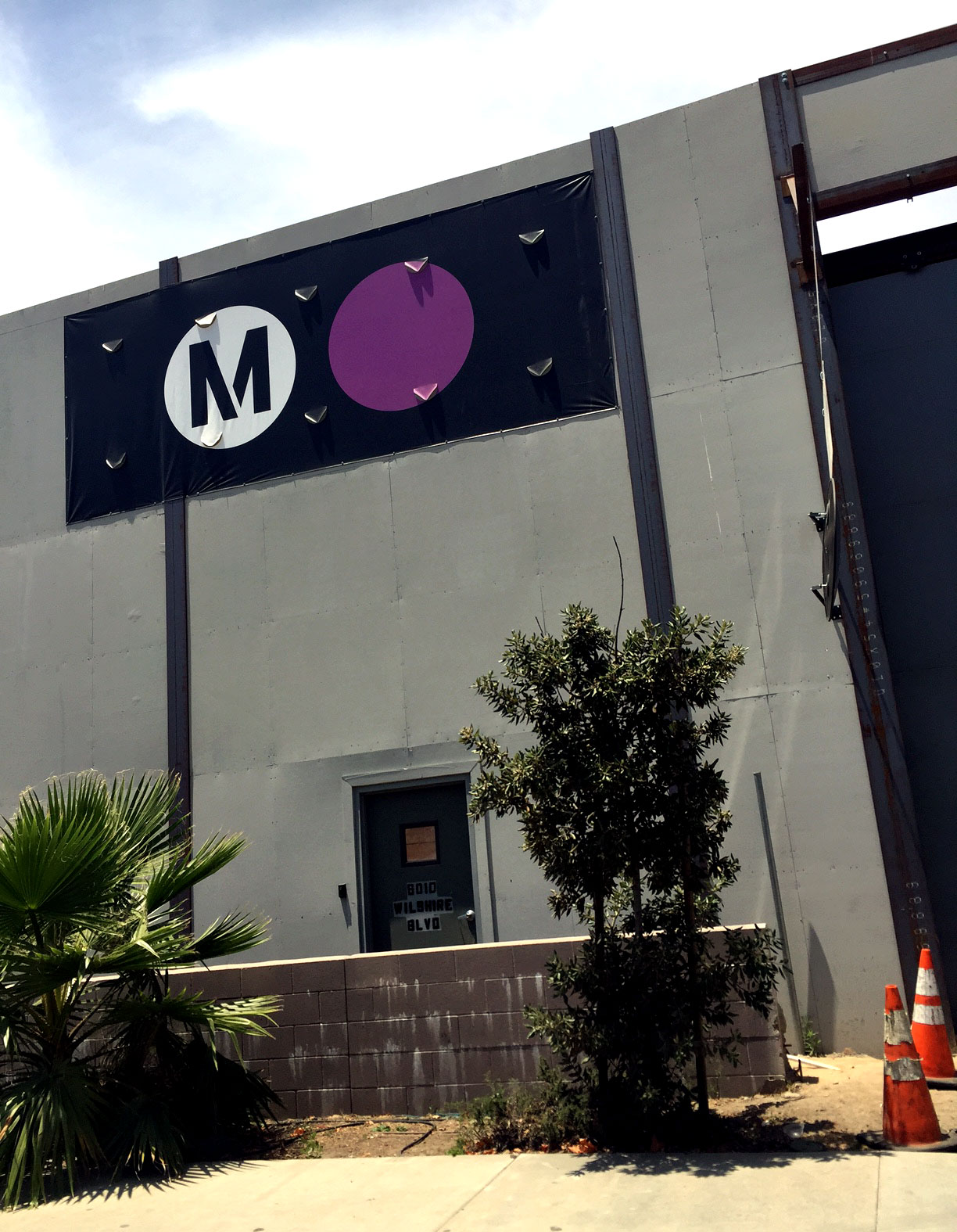
Signage announcing future site of the D Line in Miracle Mile, 2017

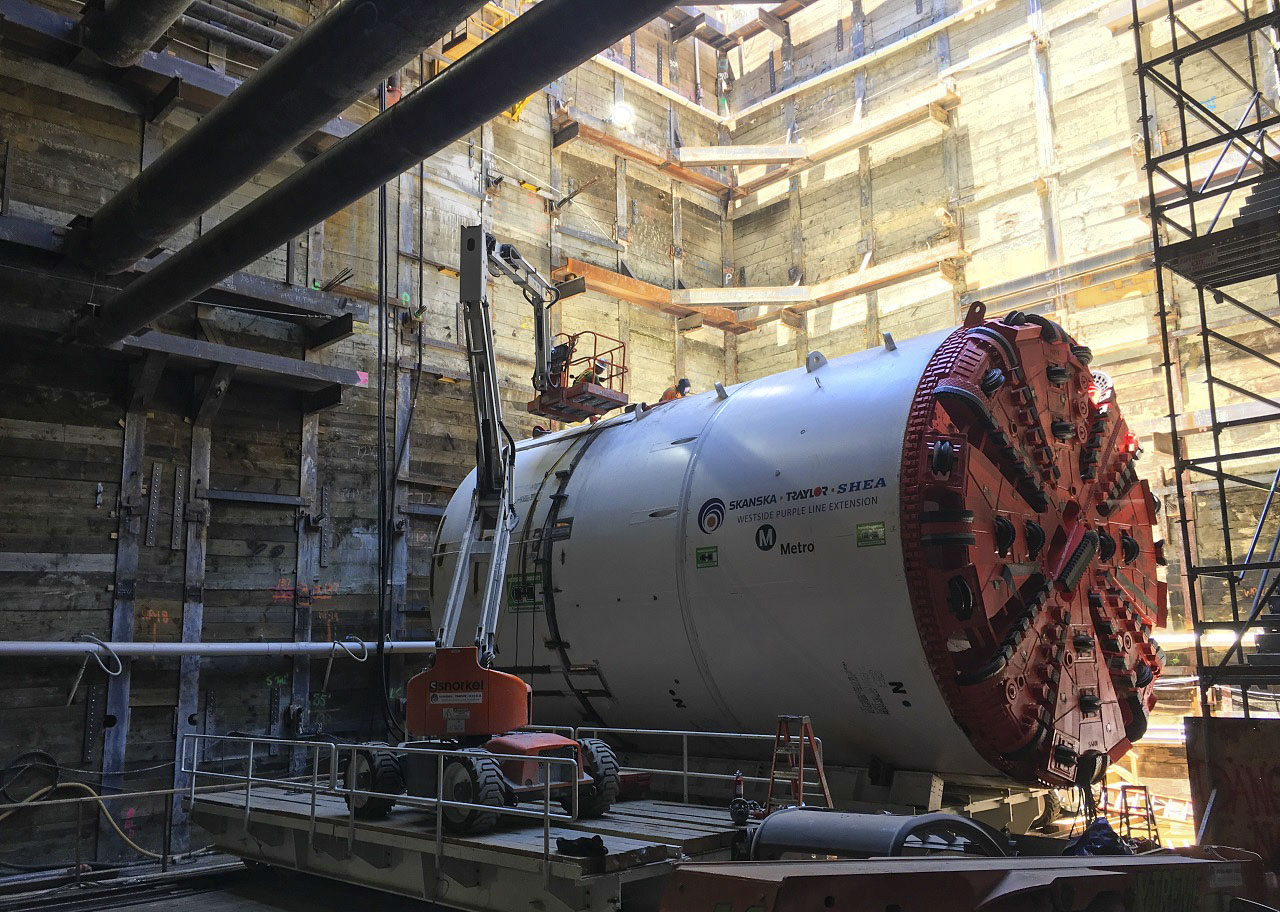
A tunnel boring machine at Wilshire/La Brea station

In July 2014, a joint venture by Skanska, Traylor and J. F. Shea Co. was selected by the Metro board, in a 9-to-3 vote, as the winner of the $1.6 billion contract for Section 1. Skanska was selected over a competing bid by Dragados that was $192 million lower because of Skanska's experience building other Los Angeles transportation projects, like the E Line and the Regional Connector.

Groundbreaking occurred for Section 1 of the extension in November 2014. The 3.9-mile-long (6.3 km) segment was originally slated to cost $2.8 billion, however due to cost overruns it is now projected at $3.35 billion. The federal government provided a $1.25 billion "New Starts" grant and an $856 million infrastructure loan, with the remainder of the budget from Measure R funds. When complete, each station will have a ridership of around 62,000 on weekdays. Twin Herrenknecht boring machines—named "Soyeon" and "Elsie", after Yi So-yeon and Elsie Eaves, following a contest involving local students—began digging the 3.9-mile (6.3 km) section in the fall of 2018 from the La Brea station to Wilshire/Western station. Soyeon arrived at Wilshire/Western in June 2019, marking the halfway point of Section 1. The TBMs were then returned to Wilshire/La Brea to head west to Wilshire/La Cienega. Construction was completed in early 2026, and Section 1 opened on May 8, 2026.

=== Section 2 ===
In January 2017, Section 2 of the project, which will extend trackage 2.6 miles (4.2 km) further to Century City, was awarded a $1.6 billion grant from the Federal Transit Administration, covering the majority of the $2.6 billion estimated cost of the project. Federal funding was secured through the last months of the Obama Administration and local funds with the passage of Measure M. On January 27, the Metro board awarded a $1.37 billion construction contract to a joint venture between Tutor Perini and O&G Industries, with construction scheduled to be completed by 2025. Section 2 was given notice to proceed in April 2017 by Metro to Tutor/O&G and it began the pre-construction phase. Major work at the planned Beverly Drive station in Beverly Hills began at the end of 2018. The official groundbreaking ceremony for Section 2 took place on February 23, 2018. The twin boring machines were introduced as Ruth Bader Ginsburg and Harriet Tubman and delivered on June 17, 2019, to the Century City station staging site where they headed east to the Wilshire/La Cienega station and reached the Beverly Drive station early 2022. Due to COVID-19 pandemic stay-at-home orders, Metro was able to fast-track the piling and decking of Beverly Drive station from a January 2021 completion to a June 2020 completion.

=== Section 3 ===
The $410 million tunneling contract was announced to the joint bid of Frontier-Kemper and Tutor Perini JV for the 2.6-mile-long (4.2 km) twin tunnel construction portion and the $1.8 billion contracts with Tutor Perini for the "design/build" of stations. These two stages were contingent on receiving the final federal full funding grant agreements (FFGA) approved by Congress in 2016. Advance utility relocation began in February 2018 for the future Westwood/UCLA station. While federal funding for Section 3 had already been approved in 2016, there were some delays from the Trump Administration in issuing funds.

Metro needed "Letters of No-Prejudice" from the USDOT FTA for tunneling before October 2018, as it would have delayed the project's approved schedule. Metro would have had to reissue the contract. USDOT finally issued the letter to proceed in September 2018. It also issued $491 million in starting grants, along with $100 million in November 2018 and another $100 Million in July 2019 of the FFGA. With these amounts received, Metro and Frontier-Kemper/Tutor Perini JV proceeded on an expedited tunneling schedule and commenced construction.

In February 2019, Metro approved the project's overall $3.6 billion budget and officially awarded contractor Tutor Perini the design/build contract. In April 2019, Metro received a second "letter of no prejudice" from the FTA for the construction of stations, testing, and track work. Metro received its twin boring machines for Section 3, The names “Aura” and “Iris” were chosen from entries submitted by veterans and Veterans Affairs employees as well as UCLA students, alumni, and employees. In February 2020, Metro received its total, and final FFGA of $1.3 billion "New Starts" grants. Construction work continues on an accelerated schedule in time to open by 2027. A groundbreaking ceremony was held for Section 3 on May 25, 2021. They began tunneling east from the Westwood/VA Hospital station. Tunneling for the project was completed on April 2, 2024.

== Marketing ==
D Line Extension
- A re-creation of the "Ride the D" design
- Type: T-shirt
- Material: Cotton (ring-spun)
- Place of origin: Los Angeles Metro
- Introduced: February 2026
- Website: Official product listing

Ride the D is a T-shirt and crop top design sold by the Los Angeles Metro that was released February 26, 2026 in anticipation of the opening of the Section 1 extension of the D Line. It features the words "Ride the D" on the front, with the "D" set inside a purple circle representing the D Line designation. The slogan is a sexual innuendo, as "the D" is also slang for penis ("the dick"). The shirts following the release have quickly gone viral. The stocked shirts sold out on February 27, 2026, just a day after launch.

The "Ride the D" design was released on February 26, 2026, accompanied by the announcement of the opening date for Section 1 of the D Line Extension. Priced at $21 for the T-shirt and $20 for the crop top, the shirt sold out on February 27, 12:48 am, a day after it was released. It was quickly restocked hours later; the design was again available for purchase. KABC-TV said of the design, "[Ride the D] might not be appropriate to wear on all occasions", and Amy LaCroix of Parade called it "surprisingly R-rated". Writing for Time Out, Michael Juliano characterized it as "channeling some real "Chaise Longue" energy", referring to a 2021 Wet Leg song which uses similar innuendo. The shirt received significant social media attention from X, where it received mixed reactions.

Neal Broverman of Mashable compared it to an incident in Seattle, Washington, where a local coffee shop, Kapow Coffee, sold a shirt that was emblazoned with the slogan "Ride the SLUT", referring to the South Lake Union Trolley.
