= Westwood/UCLA station =

Future rapid transit station in Los Angeles, California

Westwood/UCLA
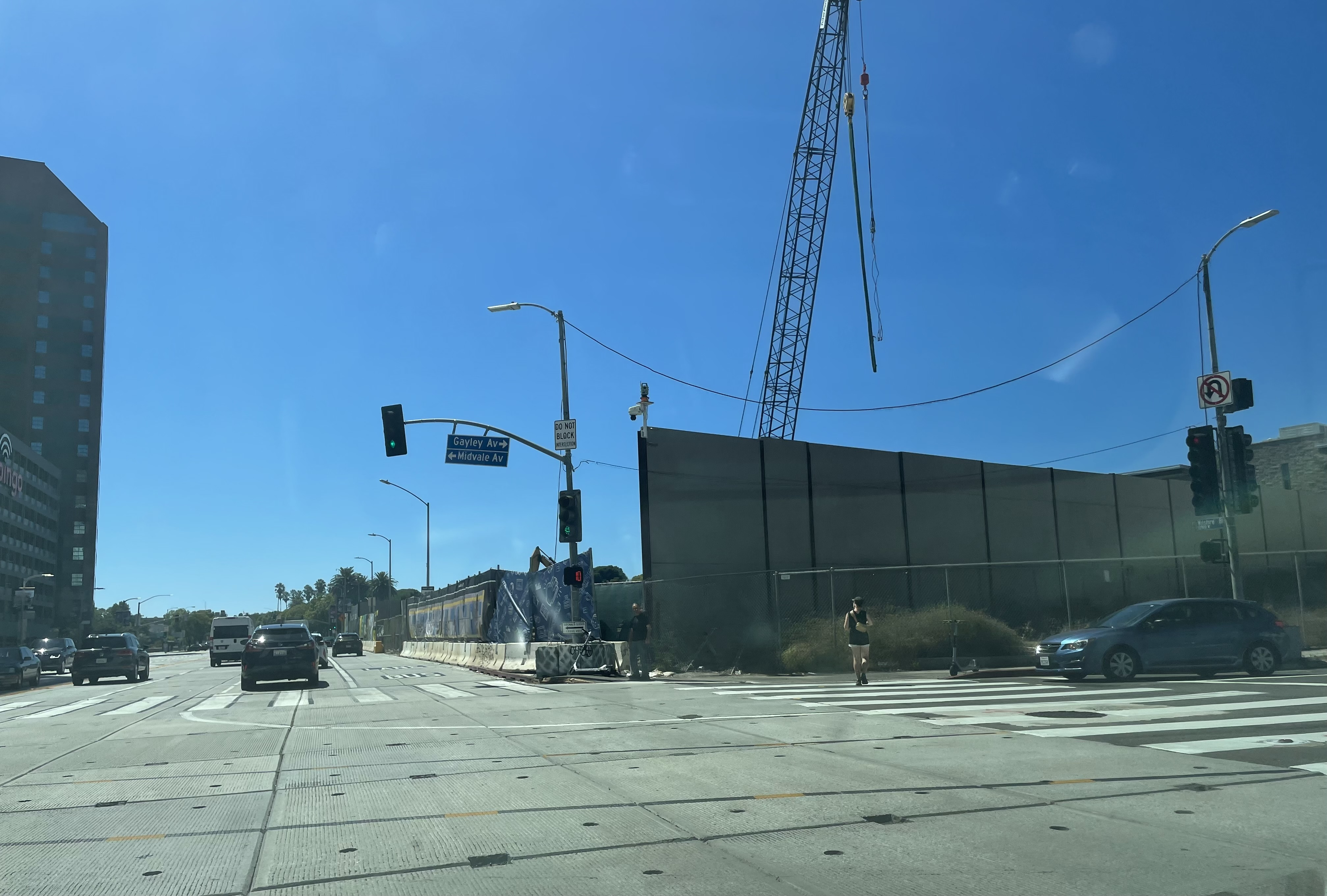
- Westwood/UCLA station under construction in August 2023

General information
- Location: Wilshire Boulevard; Los Angeles, California
- Coordinates: 34°03′31″N 118°26′46″W
- Owner: Los Angeles Metro
- Platforms: 1 island platform
- Tracks: 2

Construction
- Accessible: Yes

Other information
- Status: Under construction

History
- Opening: 2027; 1 year's time

Future services
Preceding station	Metro Rail	Following station
Westwood/VA Hospital Terminus	D Line Extension Section 3	Century City toward Union Station
Location

Westwood/UCLA station is an under construction, underground rapid transit station on the D Line of the Los Angeles Metro Rail system. The station will be located under Wilshire Boulevard between Veteran Avenue and Westwood Boulevard, south of the University of California, Los Angeles (UCLA). The main station's entrance will be on the west side on Gayley Avenue, with its other entrances on the north and south sides of Wilshire Boulevard and the west side of Westwood Boulevard.

The station is currently under construction, part of Section 3 of the D Line Extension project, with contractors hired in 2019. The station is slated to open along with Westwood/VA Hospital station in the Fall of 2027. The Sepulveda Transit Corridor is planned to connect to the D Line at this station.

== Attractions ==
- Nearby destinations include the University of California, Los Angeles (UCLA), Pauley Pavilion, Westwood Village, Tehrangeles and the neighborhood of Westwood.
- The Hammer Museum
- The Pierce Brothers Westwood Village Memorial Park and Mortuary.
- The Wilshire Federal Building
- Los Angeles National Cemetery
- Ronald Reagan UCLA Medical Center
- 10990 Wilshire Building, KB Home headquarters
- Geffen Playhouse theater
- Consulate General of Pakistan, Czech Republic and the Bahamas
- St. Paul the Apostle Church and School
- Mildred E. Mathias Botanical Garden
- Nimoy Theater
