= Century City station =

Planned rapid transit station in Los Angeles, California

Century City
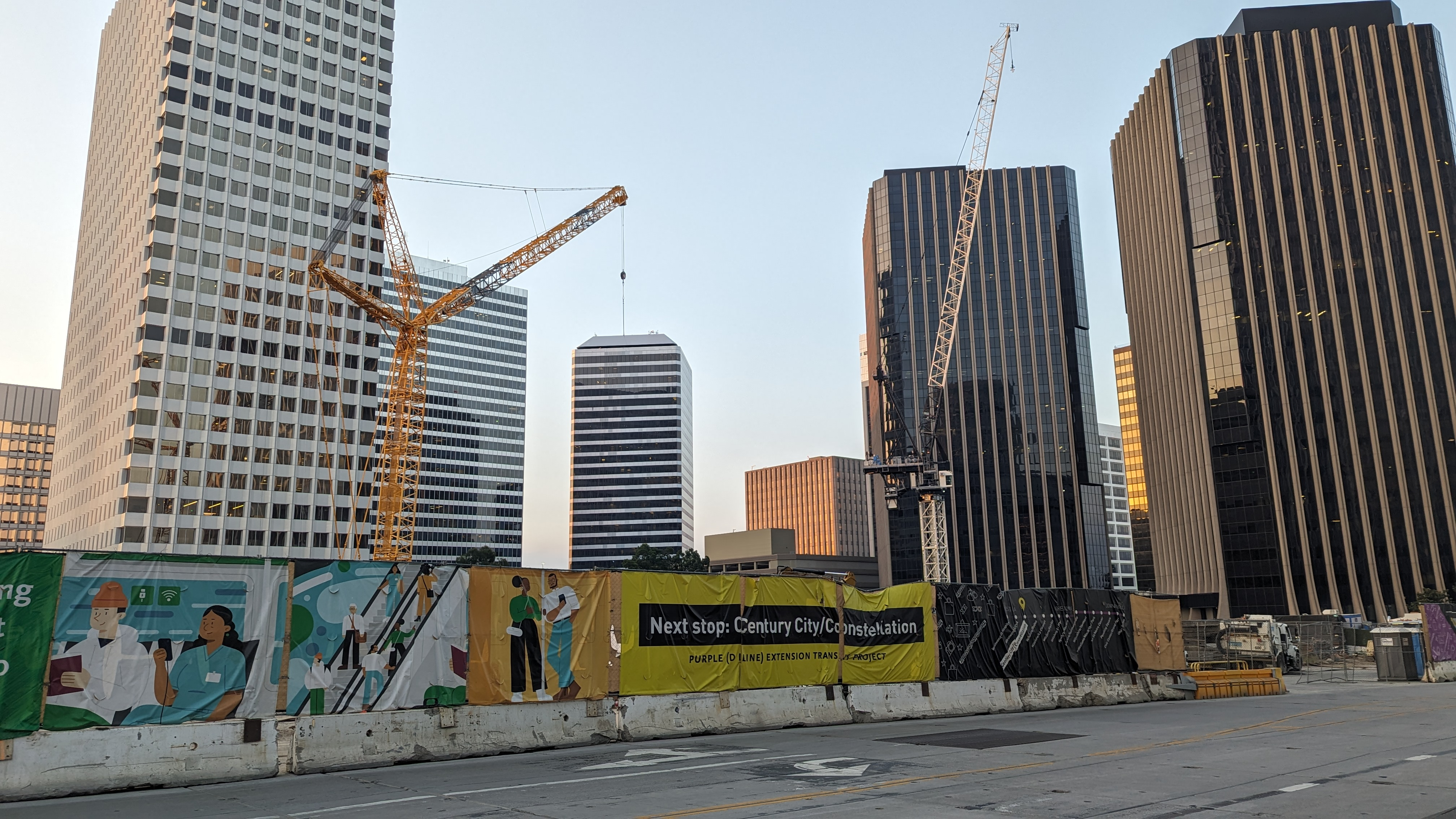
- Site of the future Century City station

General information
- Location: Constellation Boulevard and Avenue of the Stars; Los Angeles, California
- Coordinates: 34°3′35″N 118°24′54″W
- Owner: Los Angeles Metro
- Platforms: 1 island platform
- Tracks: 2

Construction
- Accessible: Yes

Other information
- Status: Under construction

History
- Opening: 2027; 1 year's time

Future services
Preceding station	Metro Rail	Following station
Terminus	D Line Extension Section 2	Beverly Drive toward Union Station
Westwood/UCLA toward Westwood/VA Hospital	D Line Extension Section 3	Beverly Drive toward Union Station
Location

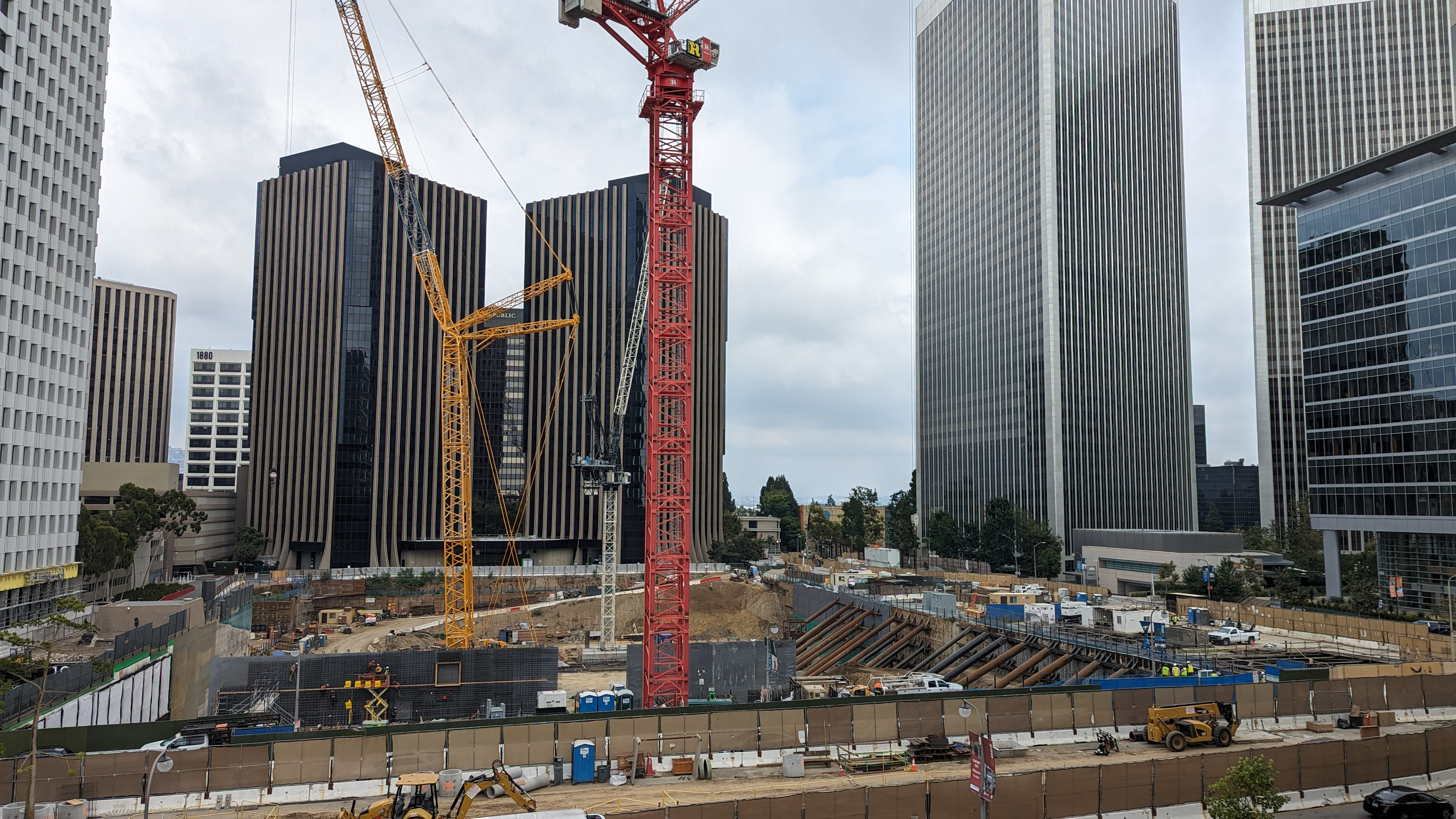
Construction site of the Century City station box (right), adjacent to the under construction Century City Center tower (left).

Century City station is an under construction, underground rapid transit station located at the intersection of Constellation Boulevard and Avenue of the Stars in the Century City district of Los Angeles, California. It will be served by the D Line of the Los Angeles Metro Rail system. Construction started in 2018 as part of Section 2 of the D Line Extension project. It is slated to open in Spring 2027.

The station was known as Century City/Constellation station during planning and early construction. From late 2022 to early 2023, Metro conducted six months of public outreach and engagement with local stakeholders, the general public, and Metro riders to determine the best name for the station. Most participants preferred the shortened name "Century City" over "Century City/Constellation." This data, combined with the shortened name aligning with Metro's property naming policy, led Metro staff to recommend adopting the shortened name. The name was approved by Metro's Executive Management Committee at its meeting on July 18, 2024, and later by Metro's board of directors at its meeting on July 25, 2024.

The station will include public art with works by Eddie Rodolfo Aparicio, Sarah Cain, Phùng Huynh, Oscar "Nimexica" Magallanes, and Analia Saban.

Century City Center is currently under construction above the station.

== Attractions ==
- Westfield Century City outdoor mall
- One Tower
- Constellation Place (formerly the MGM Tower) – Headquarters of Houlihan Lokey, ICM Partners, and International Lease Finance Corporation.
- John Paul Mitchell Systems headquarters
- Century Plaza Towers
- Century City Center
- Fairmont Century Plaza
- Fox Plaza Tower
- Fox Broadcasting Studios
- 20th Century Studios
- Beverly Hills High School
- Consulates of Australia, France, Saint Kitts and Nevis, United Arab Emirates, and the United Kingdom.
