= Westwood/VA Hospital station =

Future rapid transit station in Los Angeles, California

Westwood/VA Hospital
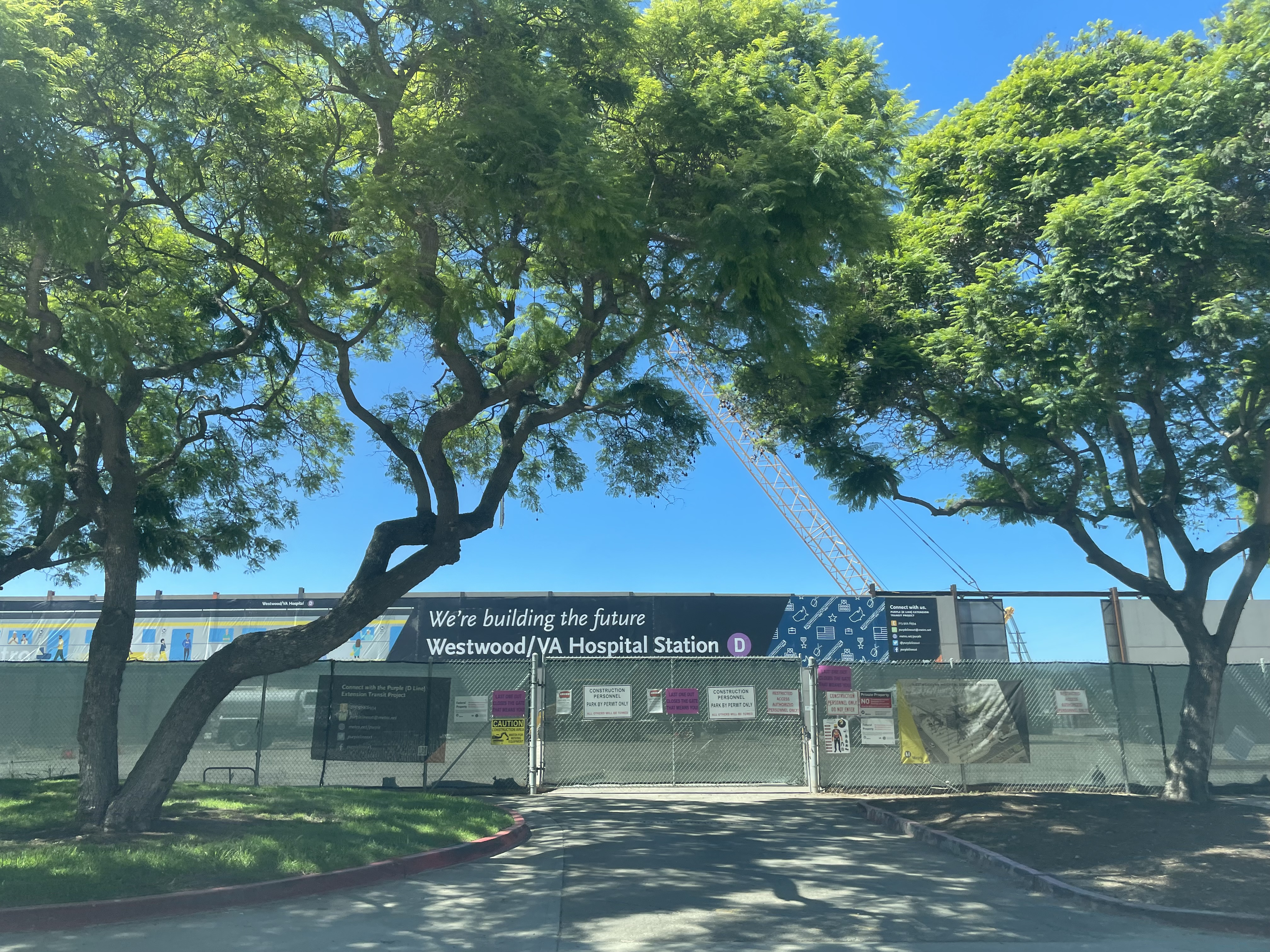
- Westwood/VA Hospital station under construction in August 2023

General information
- Location: Wilshire Boulevard; Unincorporated Los Angeles County, California
- Coordinates: 34°03′16″N 118°27′13″W
- Owner: Los Angeles Metro
- Platforms: 1 island platform
- Tracks: 2

Construction
- Accessible: Yes

Other information
- Status: Under construction

History
- Opening: 2027; 1 year's time

Future services
Preceding station	Metro Rail	Following station
Terminus	D Line Extension Section 3	Westwood/UCLA toward Union Station
Location

Westwood/VA Hospital station is an under construction, underground rapid transit station on the D Line of the Los Angeles Metro Rail system. The station will be located underground between Bonsall Avenue and Interstate 405, south of Wilshire Boulevard. The main station entrance will be located south of Wilshire Boulevard, next to Bonsall Avenue, directly serving the West Los Angeles VA Medical Center. Another entrance will be located north of Wilshire Boulevard.

The station is currently in the under construction Section 3 of the D Line Extension project, with contractors hired in 2019. The station is slated to open along with Westwood/UCLA station in the fall of 2027.

== Attractions ==
- West Los Angeles VA Medical Center
- Sawtelle Japantown
- San Vicente Boulevard in Brentwood.
- Wadsworth Chapel
- Wadsworth Theater
- Streetcar Depot, West Los Angeles
- Jackie Robinson Stadium
- Tongva Sacred Springs
- Bad News Bears Field
- Consulate General of Denmark, Azerbaijan, Bulgaria, Croatia, Finland, Greece, Hungary, Israel, Italy, Lithuania, Austria, Poland, Saudi Arabia and Romania
