= Lincoln Boulevard Transit Corridor =

Proposed transit corridor

Overview
- Status: Planned
- Locale: Westchester; Santa Monica, California

Service
- Type: BRT or LRT
- System: Los Angeles Metro

The Lincoln Boulevard Transit Corridor is a proposed 10-mile (16 km) bus rapid transit or light rail line in the public transport network of the Los Angeles Metro in Los Angeles County, California. It is planned to operate on a north to south route on Lincoln Boulevard between the C and K Line's LAX/Metro Transit Center with the E Line's Downtown Santa Monica station on the Los Angeles Metro Rail system. A proposed completion date of 2047 for BRT and an unknown date for rail conversion. It is funded by Measure M and Measure R. The route will have signal priority at traffic lights and will have a dedicated right of way.

== History ==
The transit corridor seeks to provide a one seat ride between the LAX/Metro Transit Center and Downtown Santa Monica station via a bus rapid transit or light rail line along Lincoln Boulevard. The BRT line will be converted to LRT in the future if ridership outgrows the BRT service capacity, but there is currently no funding for an LRT conversion. The corridor will service LAX, Playa Del Rey, Westchester, Venice and Santa Monica, all beach communities along Santa Monica Bay. This project may be a collaboration between Metro and Big Blue Bus as this is a Metro planned project, however BBB already runs a local service (Line 3) via Lincoln Boulevard.
