= Los Angeles Metro Rail =

Urban rail transit system serving Los Angeles County, California

Metro Rail

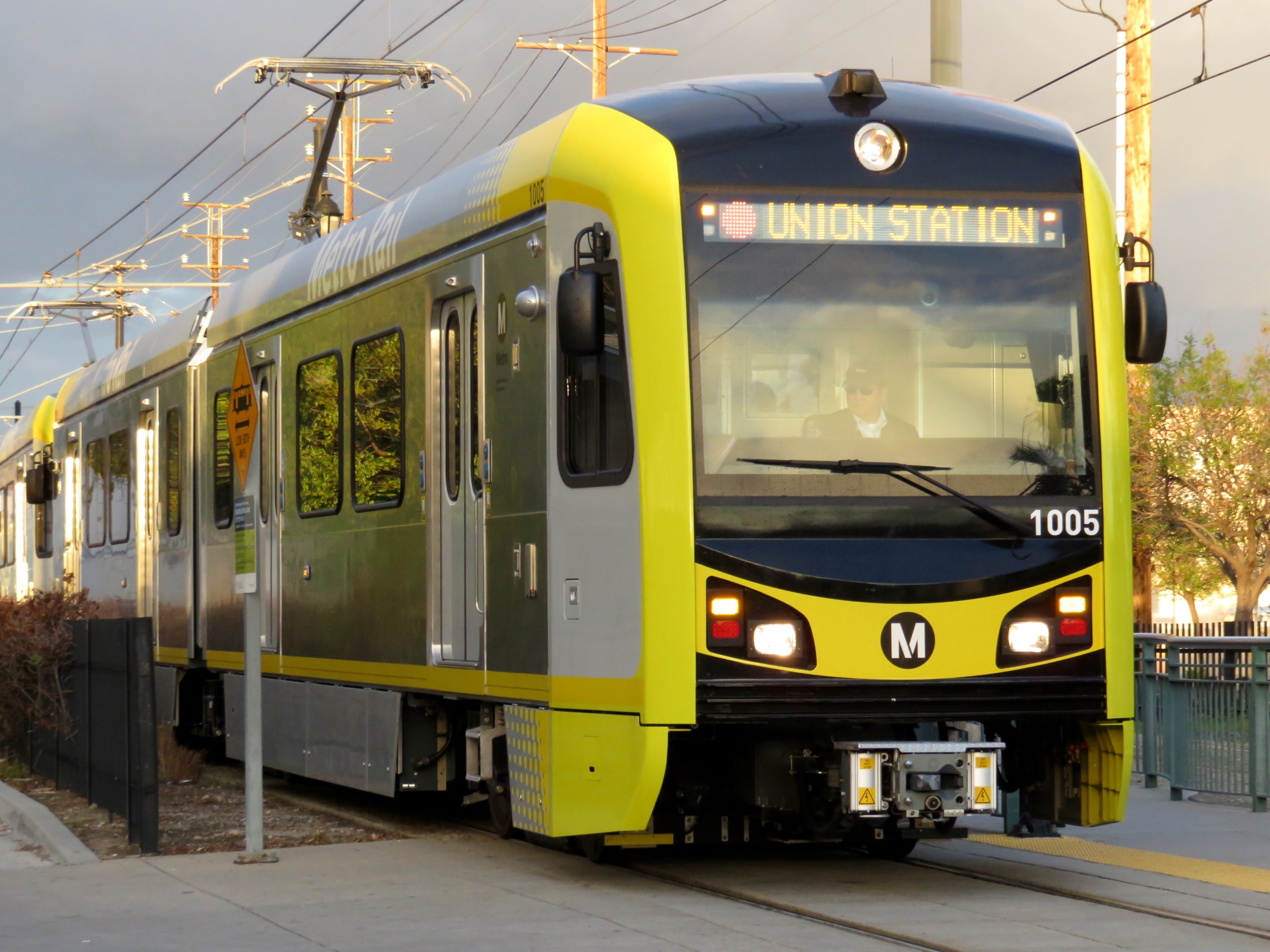
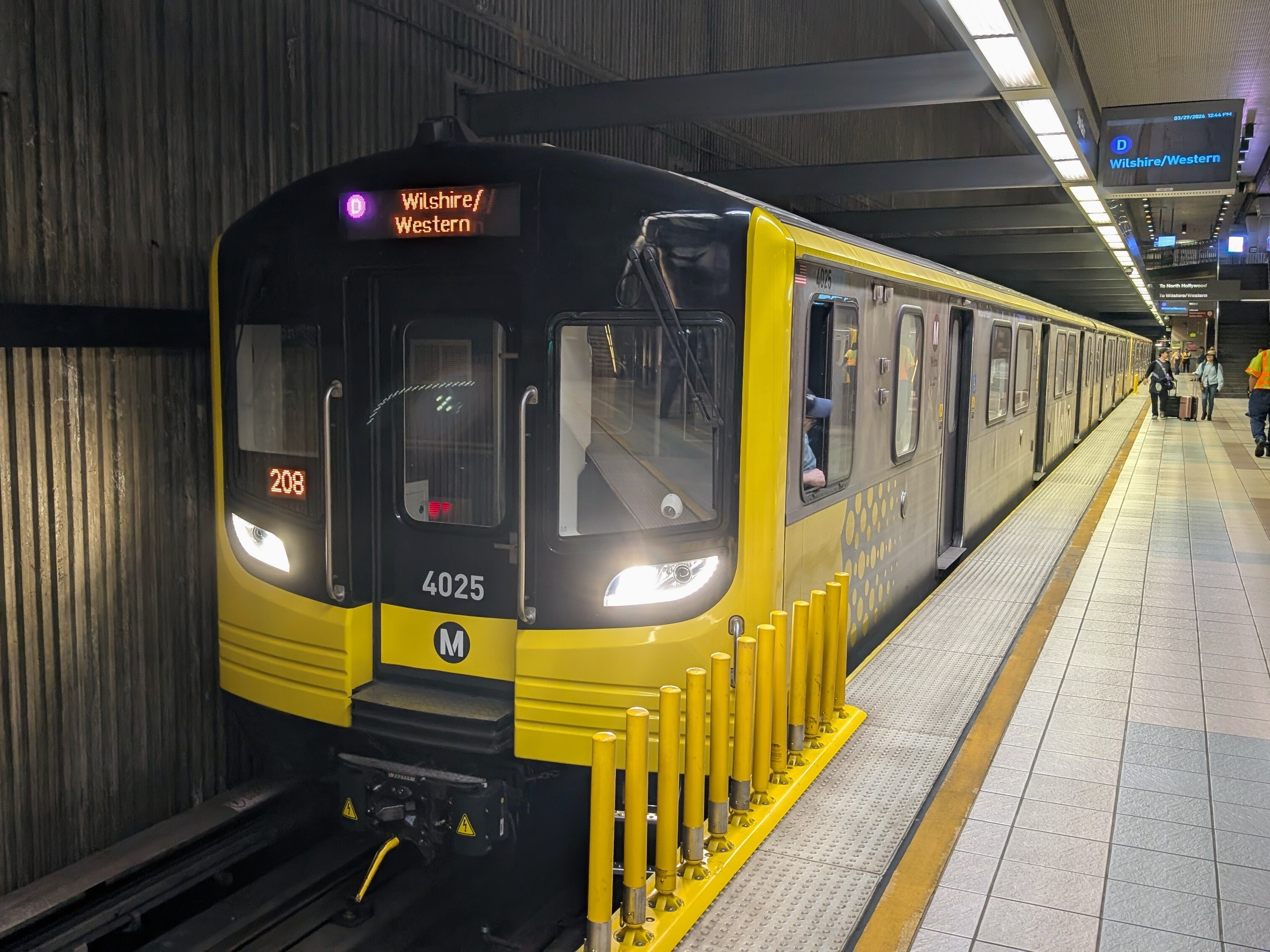
- Metro Rail light rail (left) and rapid transit (right) trains

Overview
- Area served: Los Angeles County, California
- Transit type: Light rail; Rapid transit
- Number of lines: 4 light rail lines; 2 rapid transit lines
- Number of stations: 110
- Daily ridership: 227,800 (weekdays, Q2 2026)
- Annual ridership: 68,764,300 (2025)
- Website: metro.net

Operation
- Began operation: July 14, 1990; 36 years ago
- Operator: Los Angeles Metro

Technical
- System length: 125.1 mi (201.3 km)
- Track gauge: 4 ft 8 1/2 in (1,435 mm) standard gauge
- Electrification: Overhead line (light rail) or third rail (rapid transit), 750 V DC
System map
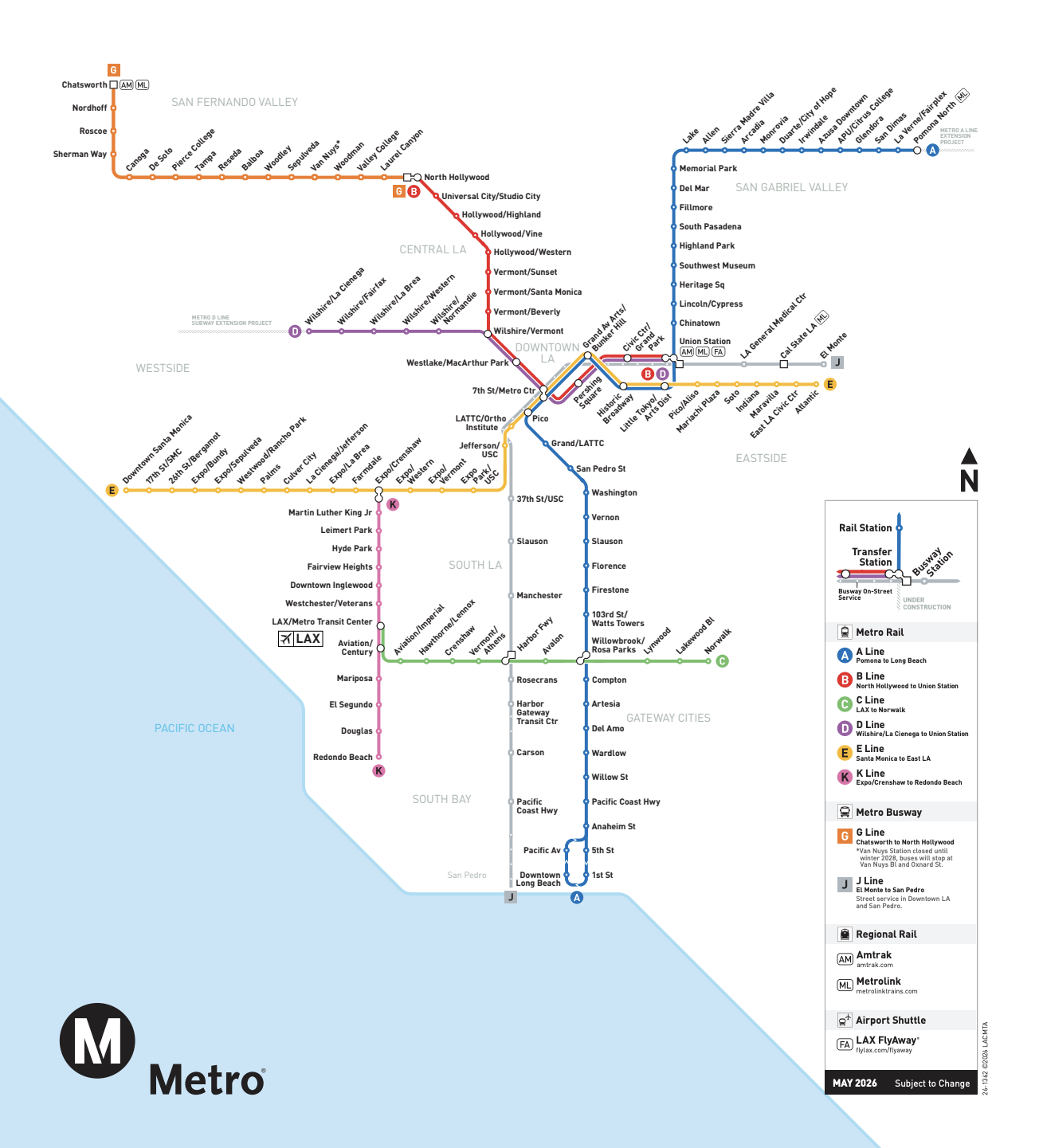
Light rail
Rapid transit
Key

Metro Rail is an urban rail transit system serving Los Angeles County, California, United States, consisting of six lines: four light rail lines (the A, C, E, and K lines) and two rapid transit lines (the B and D lines), serving a total of 110 stations (27 underground, 6 below grade, 57 at grade, and 23 elevated). The system connects with the Metro Busway bus rapid transit system (the G and J lines), the Metrolink commuter rail system, as well as several Amtrak lines. Metro Rail is owned and operated by Los Angeles Metro.

Metro Rail has been extended significantly since it started service in 1990, and several further extensions are either in the works or being considered. In 2025, the system had a ridership of 68,764,300 or about 227,800 per weekday as of the second quarter of 2026. Metro Rail operates the busiest light rail system in the United States.

Los Angeles had two previous rail transit systems, the Pacific Electric Red Car and Los Angeles Railway Yellow Car lines, which operated between the late 19th century and the 1960s. The Metro Rail system uses many of their former rights of way, and thus can be considered their indirect successor.

== Current system ==
=== Lines ===
In Los Angeles Metro terminology, common with most other metro systems, a line is a named service, defined by a route and set of stations served by trains on that route. (The word does not refer to a physical rail corridor, as it does in New York City Subway nomenclature.)

Metro also uses the same line letter naming system for its Metro Busway services (which are bus rapid transit routes operating in transitways).

Six Metro Rail lines operate in Los Angeles County:

Line name	Stations	Termini		Type
Line name	Stations	Western/Northern	Eastern/Southern	Type
A Line	48	Pomona North	Downtown Long Beach	Light rail
B Line	14	North Hollywood	Union Station	Heavy rail
C Line	12	LAX/Metro Transit Center	Norwalk	Light rail
D Line	11	Wilshire/La Cienega	Union Station	Heavy rail
E Line	29	Downtown Santa Monica	Atlantic	Light rail
K Line	13	Expo/Crenshaw	Redondo Beach	Light rail

The B and D lines follow a fully underground route, and the C Line follows a fully grade-separated route. The A, E, and K lines run in a mix of environments, including at-grade in an exclusive corridor, street running, elevated, and underground.

Two of the light rail lines (A and E) share tracks between Pico and Little Tokyo/Arts District, while two others (C and K) share tracks between the LAX/Metro Transit Center and Aviation/Century. The two rapid transit lines (B and D) share tracks between Wilshire/Vermont and Union Station.

=== Stations ===
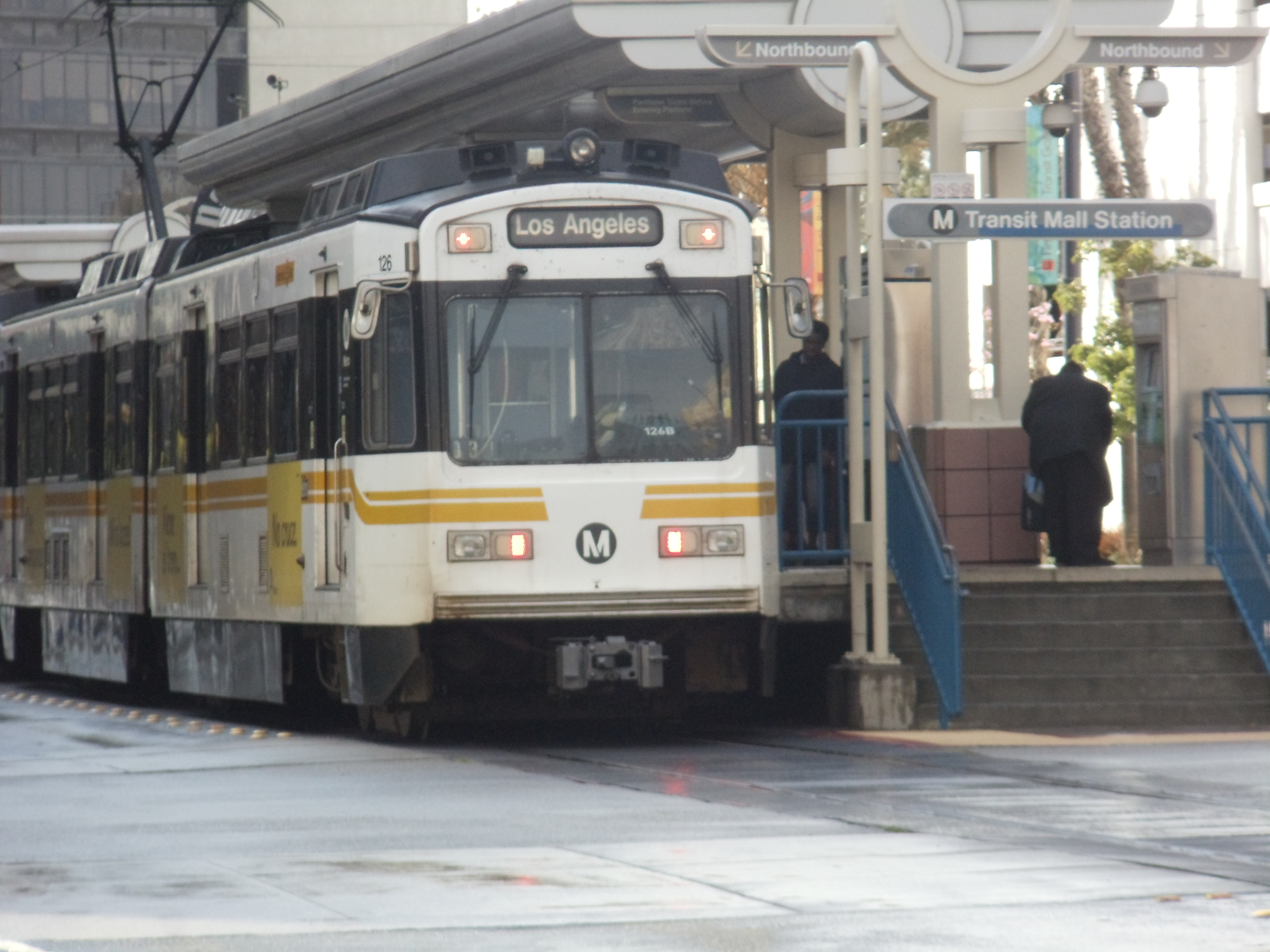
Metro A Line train stationed at Downtown Long Beach (formerly Transit Mall) station

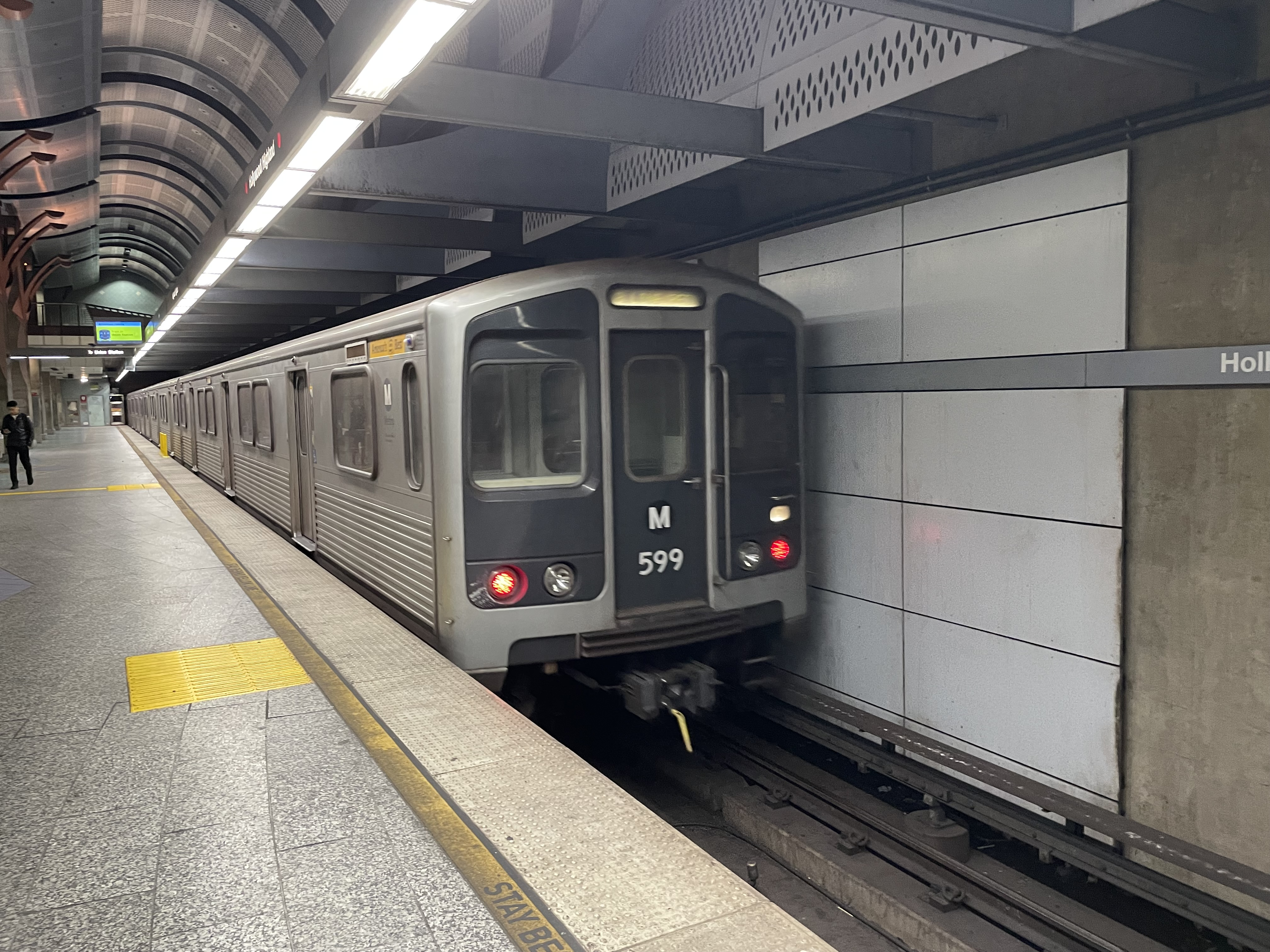
Southbound Metro B Line train departing from Hollywood/Highland station

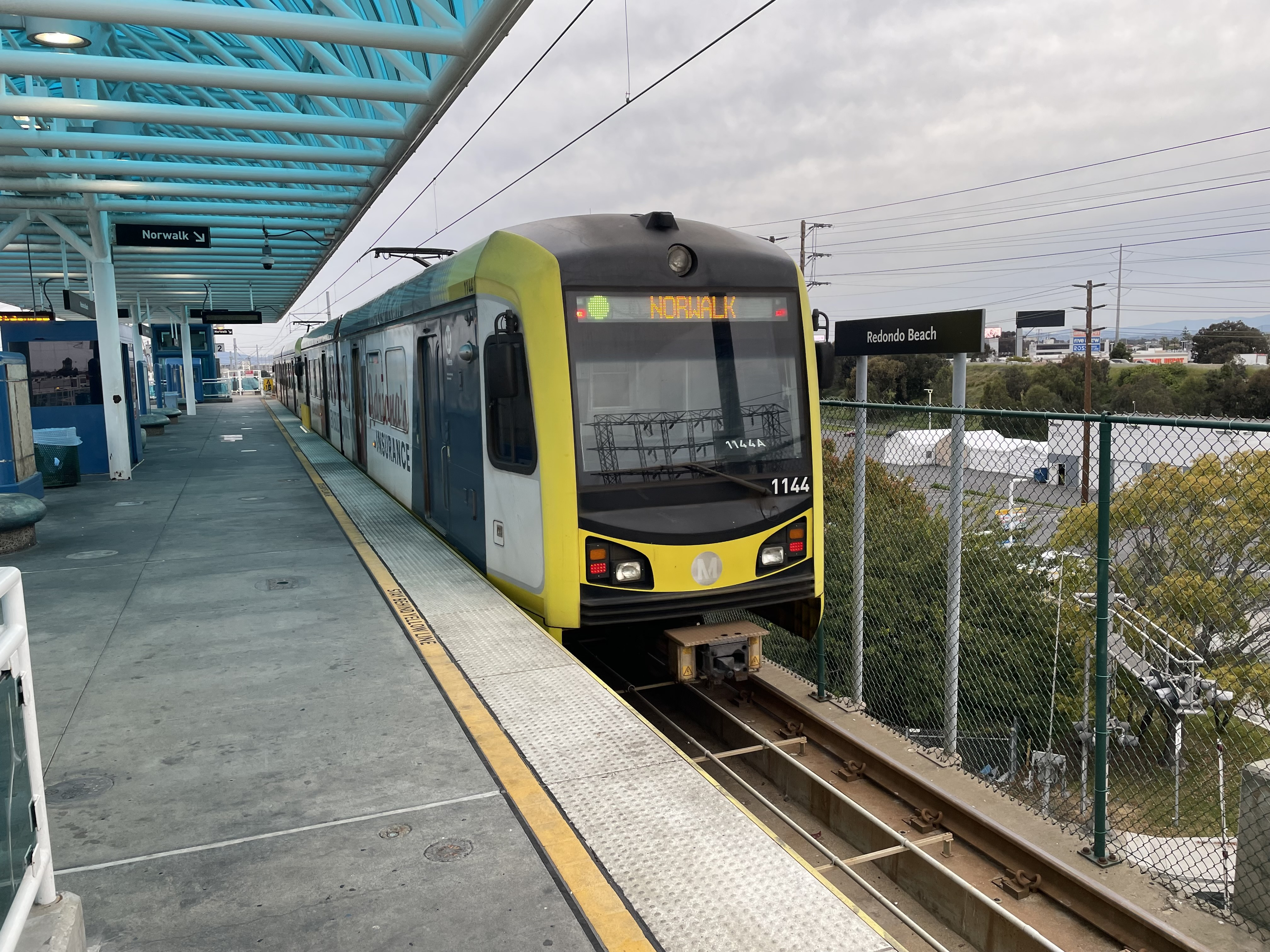
Eastbound Metro C Line train to Norwalk station departs from Redondo Beach station

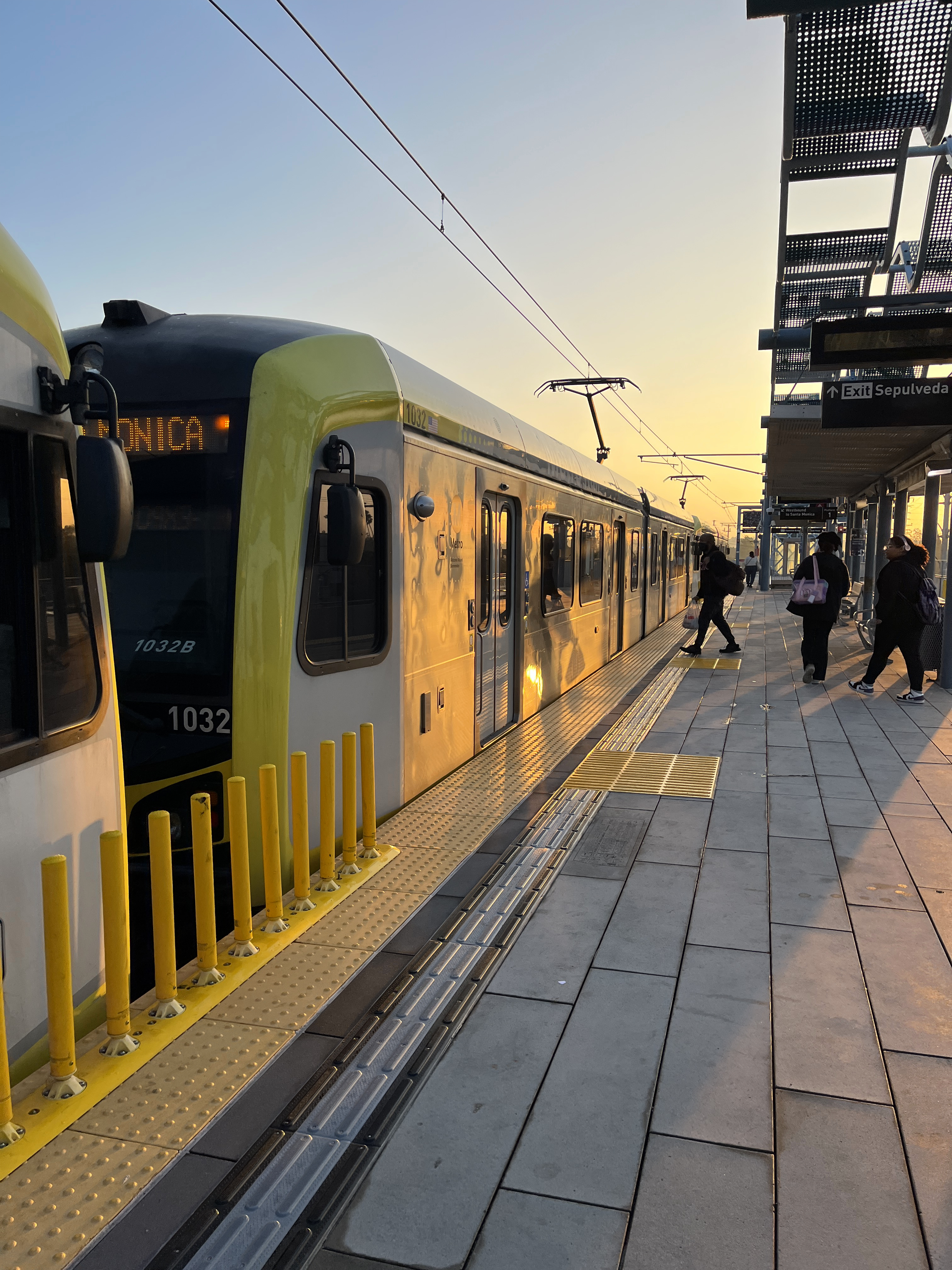
Westbound Metro E Line to Downtown Santa Monica station stopped at Expo/Sepulveda station

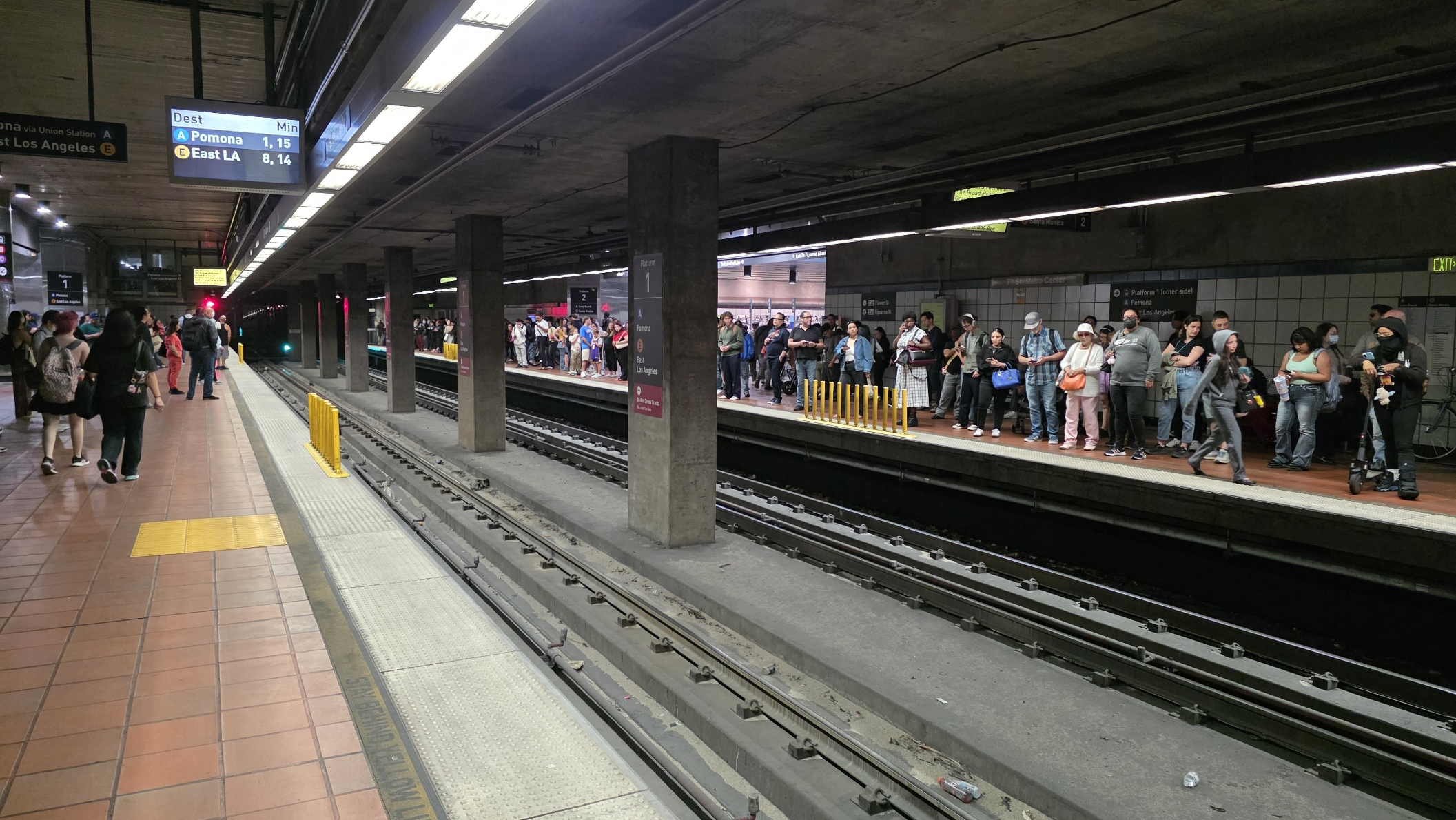
A Line & E Line platforms at 7th Street/Metro Center station

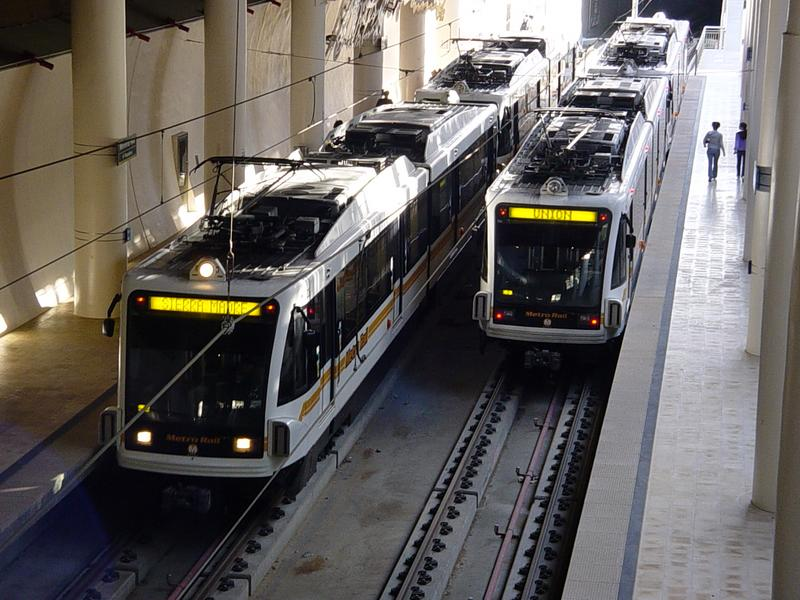
Two Siemens P2000 trains at Memorial Park station

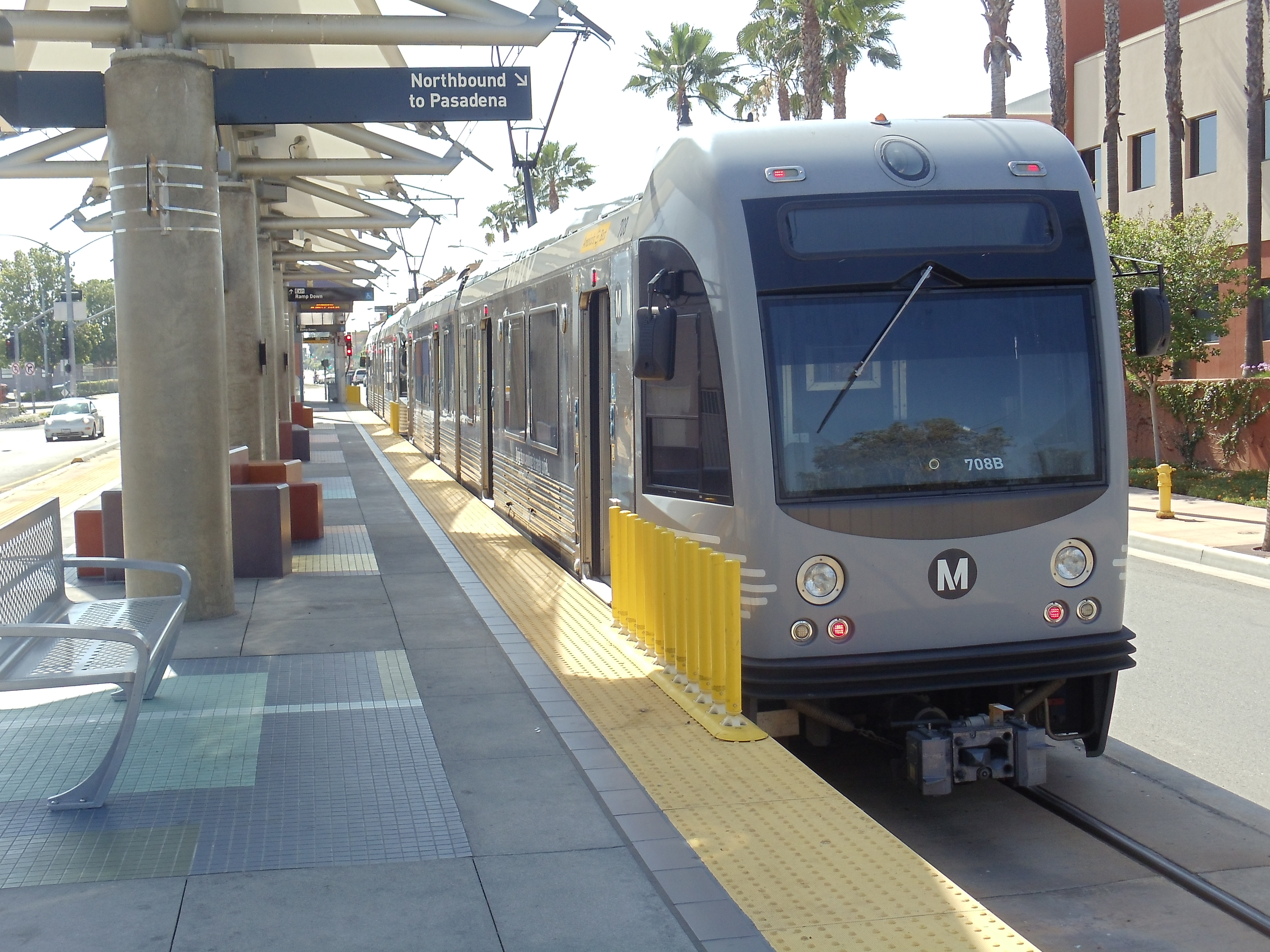
Former Metro Gold Line (now part of the E Line) train at Atlantic station

The Metro Rail system consists of 115 stations. Metro Rail light rail stations are at ground level, elevated, trenched, or fully underground. All rapid transit stations are fully underground.

Stations include at least two ticket vending machines, wayfinding maps, electronic message displays, and bench seating. Call boxes are available at stations to allow employees at the Metro Rail Operations Control Center to assist passengers with concerns. Unique artwork is integrated into every station, showcasing local culture and improving the aesthetic of the system.

Street-level stations are typically simpler with platforms designed with shade canopies, separated from nearby roads and sidewalks, where passengers can purchase fares and board a train. Free or paid park and ride lots are available at 44 stations and most have bike storage available.

Underground stations are typically larger with a mezzanine level for fare sales and collection above a platform level where passengers board trains. Underground stations and tunnels are designed to resist ground shaking that could occur at a specific location. There is no general magnitude of an earthquake that the entire system is expected to withstand. However, the Metro Rail system has not suffered any damage from earthquakes since its opening in 1990.

Metro Rail uses a proof-of-payment fare system, with Metro's fare inspectors randomly inspecting trains and stations to ensure passengers have a valid fare product on their electronic fare TAP card. When passengers enter a station, they encounter TAP card validators which collect fares when a customer places their card on top. Additionally, fare gates (turnstiles) connected to TAP card validators are at all underground stations, all elevated stations, and some surface stations. Once passengers pass these validators or board a train, they have entered the "fare paid zone", where fare inspectors may check their TAP card to ensure they have a valid fare. Passengers who fail to comply may be penalized and removed from the system.

=== Rolling stock ===
Metro Rail maintains two distinct systems of rail: a light rail system and a rapid transit (subway) system, which use incompatible technologies, even though they both use 4 ft 8 1/2 in (1,435 mm) standard gauge and use 750 V power. Metro's rapid transit lines are powered by third rail, whereas its light rail lines are powered by overhead catenary. Also, the two separate systems have different loading gauge, and platforms are designed to match the separate car widths.

=== Hours of operation ===
The Los Angeles Metro Rail system runs for about 19 hours each day between 5:00 am and 11:45 pm. Limited service on particular segments is provided after midnight and before 5:00 am. There is no rail service available between 2:00 am and 3:30 am except on special occasions such as New Year's Eve. Before the COVID-19 pandemic in March 2020, service operated until approximately 2:00 am on Fridays and Saturdays. The Saturday service after midnight was ended during the pandemic to accommodate train cleaning during those hours.

Service frequency was increased in December 2023 when pandemic conditions were ending. Trains operate more frequently during weekday peak hours and less at other times. During peak hours, the light rail A and E lines run every 8 minutes and the light rail C and K lines run every 10 minutes. The light rail lines operate on 10-minute headways during off-peak periods and weekends. As of April 2026, service frequency was increased on the B and D rapid transit lines with 10-minute headways throughout the day. During early morning hours on weekends and late night hours every day, train frequency on all lines is reduced to every 20 minutes.

Metro plans to increase train frequencies, proposing to further reduce headways on the B, C, D, and K lines in 2025.

=== Fares and fare collection ===
The standard Metro base fare applies for all trips. Fare collection is based on a partial proof-of-payment system. At least two fare machines are at each station. Fare inspectors, local police, and deputy sheriffs police the system and cite individuals without proof of payment. Passengers are required to purchase a TAP card to ride Metro Rail. Passengers using a TAP card can transfer between Metro routes for free within 2 hours from the first tap.

Metro introduced daily and weekly fare caps in July 2023, replacing upfront daily and weekly passes, while monthly passes were discontinued outright. With fare capping, the cost of each trip is credited towards the cost of a daily or weekly unlimited pass, automatically ensuring that all passengers pay the lowest fare possible. Due to this, passengers will never pay more than $5 (3 rides) in a day or $18 (11 rides) within seven days; rides are free once the cap is reached. Discounted or free fares are available for seniors, disabled individuals, Medicare recipients, low-income individuals, and students.

The following table shows Metro fares, effective July 1, 2023 (in US dollars):

Fare type	Regular	Senior (62+) Disabled Medicare	Student K-12/ College Vocational	Low Income (LIFE)
Base fare	$1.75	$0.35 (off-peak) $0.75 (peak)	$0.75	20 Free Rides then Regular fare
1-Day Cap	$5	$2.50	$2.50	20 Free Rides then Regular fare
7-Day Cap	$18	$5	$6	20 Free Rides then Regular fare
Metro-to-Muni Transfer	$0.50	$0.25	—	—

==== TAP card and fare gates ====
Metro has implemented a system of electronic fare collection using a stored-value smartcard called the TAP card. This card was intended to simplify fare collection and reduce costs. In 2012, paper monthly passes were phased out and replaced with the TAP Card. As of September 2013, first-time Metro riders must deposit an additional $2 (or $1 at TAP vending machines) on top of their first fare payment to obtain a reloadable TAP Card. In addition, in 2008 Metro began installing fare gates at all underground stations, all elevated stations, and some surface stations. Implementation of both programs (the TAP Card and the fare gate program) has turned out to be expensive ($154 million in total, so far) and its initial rollout was problematic.

=== Ridership ===
In 2025, the Metro Rail system had a ridership of 68,764,300.

As of the second quarter of 2026, the combined Metro B and D lines averaged a weekday ridership of 68,400, making it the ninth busiest rapid transit system in the United States. Taking overall track length into consideration, Metro Rail's rapid transit lines transport 7,960 passengers per route mile, making this the fifth busiest U.S. rapid transit system on a per mile basis, yet at just 70% of pre-pandemic ridership levels. Metro's light rail system is the second-busiest in the United States with 159,400 average weekday boardings as of the second quarter of 2026. In terms of route length, Metro's light rail system is the largest in the United States.

=== Security and safety ===
Half of the Metro Rail's trains and stations are patrolled by the Los Angeles County Sheriff's Department under a law enforcement contract. The Los Angeles Police Department and Long Beach Police Department patrol stations within their respective cities, also under contract. The system is monitored by security personnel through closed-circuit television cameras. Metro Ambassadors are an in-house outreach team to provide a better user experience. They help riders navigate and provide information about the system.

In June 2024, the Metro Executive Board voted 10-0 to create their own transit police force. A cited reason included frustration with a lack of control over the existing contracts. This force is planned to consist of officers, crisis workers, and homelessness outreach teams.

== History ==
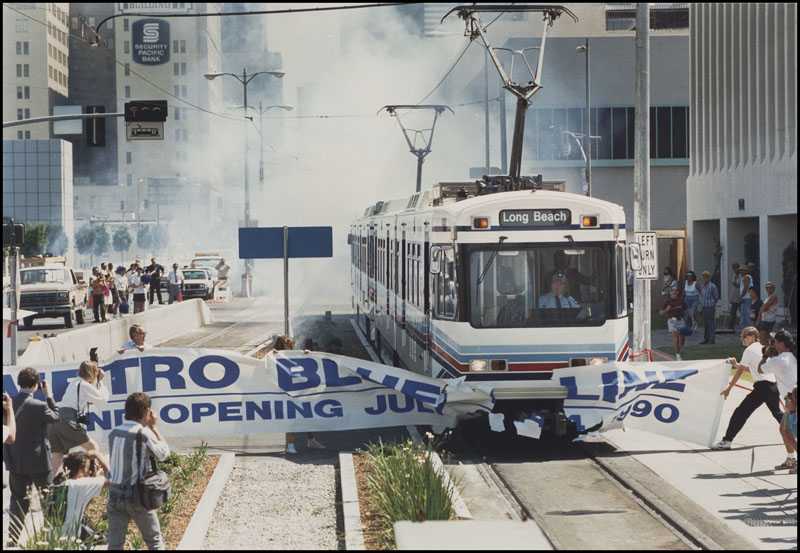
The first operating segment of Los Angeles Metro Rail opened on July 14, 1990, then known as the Blue Line.

In the early 20th century, Southern California had an extensive privately owned rail transit network with over 1,000 miles (1,600 km) of track, operated by Pacific Electric (Red Cars) and Los Angeles Railway (Yellow Cars). However, from 1927 revenue shortfall caused Pacific Electric to begin replacing lightly used rail lines with buses. In 1958, the remnants of the privately owned rail and bus systems were consolidated into a government agency known as the Los Angeles Metropolitan Transit Authority or MTA. By 1963, the remaining rail lines were completely removed and replaced with bus service.

In the following decades, growing traffic congestion led to increased public support for rail transit's return. Beginning in the 1970s, a variety of factors, including environmental concerns, an increasing population, and the price of gasoline led to calls for mass transit other than buses. Los Angeles Metro began construction of the initial lines throughout the 1980s using revenues from a voter-approved increase in sales tax. The Blue (A) Line opened on July 14, 1990, 27 years after the final streetcar line closed. The system has been progressively expanded since. The following table shows this expansion's timeline:

Just before the opening of the Metro Rail, Proposition U passed, which halved the allowable residential density throughout much of Los Angeles. This reduced the viability of the Metro Rail by limiting dense residential housing near transit stations. Before 2000, none of the land near the stations was converted to residential use.

Segment description	Date opened	Current line(s) on segment	Endpoints	Number of new stations	Length (miles)	Construction cost
Blue Line Initial Segment	July 14, 1990	A Line E Line	Pico – Anaheim Street	17	19.1	$2.2 billion
Blue Line Long Beach Loop	September 1, 1990	A Line	Anaheim Street – Pacific Avenue	4	2.2	$2.2 billion
Blue Line To Financial District	February 15, 1991	A Line E Line	Pico – 7th Street/Metro Center	1	0.7	$2.2 billion
Red Line MOS-1	January 30, 1993	B Line D Line	Union Station – Westlake/MacArthur Park	4 (Note: Segment also included significant expansion of an existing station(s): this was not counted as a new station.)	4.4	$3.1 billion
Green Line	August 12, 1995	C Line K Line	Redondo Beach – Norwalk	13	20.0	$1.5 billion
Red Line MOS-2 West	July 13, 1996	B Line D Line	Westlake/MacArthur Park – Wilshire/Western	3	2.0	$3.4 billion
Red Line MOS-2 North	June 12, 1999	B Line	Wilshire/Vermont – Hollywood/Vine	5	4.7	$3.4 billion
Red Line MOS-3	June 24, 2000	B Line	Hollywood/Vine – North Hollywood	3	6.3	$2.3 billion
Gold Line Initial Segment	July 26, 2003	A Line	Union Station – Sierra Madre Villa	12	13.7	$721 million
Gold Line Eastside Extension	November 15, 2009	A Line E Line	Union Station – Atlantic	8	6.0	$887 million
Expo Line Phase 1	April 28, 2012	E Line	Flower/Washington – La Cienega/Jefferson (Note: In terms of added trackage; Expo Line was through service to 7th Street/Metro Center.)	8	7.6	$1.3 billion
Expo Line To Culver City	June 20, 2012	E Line	La Cienega/Jefferson – Culver City	1	1.0	$1.3 billion
Farmdale station	June 20, 2012	E Line	Farmdale	1 (Note: Infill station on the Expo Line between Expo/La Brea and Expo/Crenshaw; opened on the same day in conjunction with the Expo Line To Culver City.)	–	$1.3 billion
Gold Line Foothill Extension Phase 2A	March 5, 2016	A Line	Sierra Madre Villa – APU/Citrus College	6	11.5	$714 million
Expo Line Phase 2	May 20, 2016	E Line	Culver City – Santa Monica	7	6.6	$1.5 billion
L Line Little Tokyo Closure	October 24, 2020	–	Little Tokyo/Arts District	-1 (Note: The at-grade Little Tokyo/Arts District station was demolished to make way for the Regional Connector; it was replaced by an underground station nearby.)	-0.3 (Note: In terms of removed trackage; L Line service between Union Station and Pico/Aliso was discontinued.)	–
K Line Initial Segment	October 7, 2022	K Line	Expo/Crenshaw – Westchester/Veterans	6	5.9	$2.1 billion
Regional Connector	June 16, 2023	A Line E Line	7th Street/Metro Center – Little Tokyo/Arts District	3	1.9	$1.8 billion
Aviation/Century station	November 3, 2024	C Line K Line	Aviation/Century	1	1.2 (Note: 0.1 removed from revenue service, 1.3 added to revenue service.)	–
LAX/Metro Transit Center	June 6, 2025	C Line K Line	Westchester/Veterans – Aviation/Century	1	1.2	$900 million
Foothill Extension Phase 2B to Pomona	September 19, 2025	A Line	APU/Citrus College – Pomona North	4	9.1	$1.5 billion
D Line Extension Section 1	May 8, 2026	D Line	Wilshire/Western – Wilshire/La Cienega	3	3.9	$3.5 billion
Total				110	125.1 (Note: Likely varies from the "official" Metro figure due to rounding differences.)	$27.4 billion

== Planned expansion ==
Metro has worked to plan and prioritize project funding and implementation. Metro's 2009 Long Range Transportation Plan (LRTP) was developed to provide a long-term vision of transportation system development for the next 30 years. Metro worked to update the 2009 LRTP citing new housing trends and fiscal changes. Metro released the updated LRTP in 2020.

Beginning in 2014, Metro saw its ridership numbers begin to decline. Many explanations exist for the decline, including safety concerns, an increase in ride-hailing service usage, low-income housing opportunities drying up in L.A. because of the increase in rents, and a shortage of housing. Ridership declines also coincide with passage of AB 60, signed into law by Governor Jerry Brown in 2013, which provides for issuance of a driver's license regardless of immigration status.

The fiscal changes are the passage of Measure R, a countywide incremental sales tax increase passed by voters in 2008, providing funding for many of the highest priority projects in the LRTP. On November 6, 2012, Metro attempted to pass Measure J, but failed as it did not reach the two-thirds majority needed to pass. In the November 2016 election, Metro decided to place another sales tax on the ballot. The voters then approved Measure M, a half-cent permanent sales tax increase to fund many local projects, including Metro Rail expansion.

In 2018, Metro approved renaming its rail lines using a letter-based scheme, similar to those in New York City. Metro recommended the opening of the refurbished A Line in 2019 as a starting point to rename the lines, and then continuing with the opening of the K line, finishing in time for the opening of the Regional Connector in 2023.

LA Metro also plans to expand Union Station tracks and service. Metro has proposed "Link Union Station" to extend tracks 3-10 as run thru tracks. Phase one is to be completed by 2028. Other phases include adding a California High-Speed Rail platform area, a Southeast Gateway line terminus station, and renovate the concourse areas.

=== Current and priority projects ===
The following rail projects have been given high priority by Metro. They all appear in the 2009 LRTP constrained plan, and all have funding earmarked from Measure R. With the passage of Measure M in 2016, Metro released an updated Long Range Transportation Plan in February 2017, and released a full report in 2020, along with its Twenty-eight by '28 initiative.

Concept name	Description	Construction	Operational	Status	Ref.
D Line Subway Extension Project	Section 2 extends a further three miles west from La Cienega through Beverly Hills to Century City. Section 3 extends west to Westwood/UCLA and the VA Medical Center. Section 1 opened on May 8, 2026. Sections 2 and 3 are under construction with plans to finish in time for the 2028 Summer Olympics.	2015–2027	2027 (Section 2) / 2027 (Section 3)	Under construction	
East San Fernando Valley Light Rail Transit Project	Constructs a light rail line connecting the east San Fernando Valley to the G Line, largely along the median of Van Nuys Blvd and San Fernando Road. The line will connect with Metrolink and Amtrak at the Van Nuys station and the future Sepulveda Transit Corridor.	2022	2032	Under construction	
Southeast Gateway Line	Creates a new light rail line connecting Downtown Los Angeles to Artesia and the Gateway Cities, much of it along the West Santa Ana Branch.	2025	2035	Under construction	
North Hollywood to Pasadena Bus Rapid Transit Project	BRT with potential LRT conversion. Connecting North Hollywood to Memorial Park in Pasadena. Feasibility Study for Rail requested in May 2024.	BRT 2025; LRT Unknown	BRT 2027; LRT Unknown	Under construction	
Vermont Transit Corridor	A new north–south route down Vermont Avenue between Wilshire/Vermont station, Connecting the Metro B Line, E Line and C Line. A bus rapid transit line is currently under construction with Measure M funding. Studies will be conducted for possible heavy rail rapid transit, as the Vermont corridor is Metro's second busiest public transportation corridor.	BRT 2020; HRT 2060	BRT 2028–2030; HRT 2067	Under construction	
Foothill Extension Phase 2B to Claremont	Further extends the A Line east from Pomona North to Claremont.	2027	2031	LPA adopted / EIR Completed	
Eastside Transit Corridor Phase 2	Further extends the E Line southeast from East Los Angeles to Whittier.	2029	2035	LPA adopted / EIR Completed	
K Line Extension to Torrance	Extends the K Line from its current terminus in Redondo Beach southeast towards Torrance and South Bay cities.	2027	2036	LPA adopted / EIR Completed	
Sepulveda Transit Corridor	An automated heavy rail single-bore tunnel connection between the G Line and the East San Fernando Valley Transit Corridor (see above) in the Valley to the D and E lines on the Westside. Existing local funding will provide approximately $5.7 billion for the project for a scheduled opening in the early 2030s; additional funds, including from public–private partnerships, are being sought. Estimated to cost around $24 billion.	2033	2033–2035 (Phase 1) / 2057–2059 (Phase 2)	LPA adopted / EIR in progress	
K Line Northern Extension	Extends the K Line north via a new fully underground alignment connecting the B Line's Hollywood/Highland station south to the D Line, and the K Line's Expo/Crenshaw station via West Hollywood. North–south route would follow Santa Monica Boulevard, thru Beverly Boulevard, down Fairfax, and San Vicente Boulevard.	2041	2047	LPA adopted / Final EIR in progress	
Arts District/6th Street station	Extends the B and D rapid transit lines south from Union Station along the L.A. River to the Arts District, and possibly across the river along Whittier Boulevard to the Eastside. However, Metro is studying the possibility of adding one or two stops along the river in the Arts District as part of a project to improve and expand the rail yard already in the area to accommodate increased headways once the D Line extension west is completed.	Unknown	Unknown	Draft EIR in progress	
G Line LRT conversion	Converting the current G Line bus rapid transit route into light rail. Made possible after the 2014 repeal of state legislation prohibiting light rail along the G Line right of way, which had been enacted due to neighborhood opposition in the 1990s. Long term plans include complete conversion in phases with full replacement by 2057. Metro commenced BRT upgrades in 2018 to add grade crossing gates, and two new elevated segments at Van Nuys Bl and Sepulveda Bl, reducing travel time by 20%.	2051	2057	No current funds available for LRT until 2051	
Lincoln Boulevard Transit Corridor	BRT with eventual LRT conversion along Lincoln Boulevard from LAX/Metro Transit Center to Downtown Santa Monica. The C Line was originally engineered to maintain compatibility with this extension. Included in City of Los Angeles Westside Mobility Plan, and as a Tier 2 Strategic Unfunded Plan project in 2009 Long Range Transportation Plan.	BRT 2043; LRT Unknown	BRT 2047; LRT Unknown	No LPA or EIR conducted	

=== Other expansion concepts ===
Metro's Long Range Transportation Plan was published in 2009, and was updated in 2020. The following proposed line/system expansions do not have funding or high priority in Metro's long-range plans. Some are listed as "strategic unfunded" in the last Long Range Transportation Plan, indicating some possibility they could be constructed should additional funding materialize. Others have been the subject of Metro Board discussion, with the possibility of future feasibility studies. (More information on each project can be found in the references.)

Concept name	Description	Source
Burbank–Glendale Line	Would connect Downtown Los Angeles to Glendale and Burbank. Studied in the 1990s, and included as a Tier 1 Strategic Unfunded Plan project in 2009 Long Range Transportation Plan.	
B Line to Hollywood Burbank Airport	Extend the Metro B Line 3.2 miles (5.1 km) from its northwestern terminus to Hollywood Burbank Airport. Included as a Tier 1 Strategic Unfunded Plan project in 2009 Long Range Transportation Plan.	
C Line to Norwalk/Santa Fe Springs Metrolink	Extend the C Line east to Norwalk/Santa Fe Springs station (Metrolink). Included as a Tier 1 Strategic Unfunded Plan project in 2009 Long Range Transportation Plan, but is included among the Major Transit Projects (Figure 8) in the 2020 Long Range Transportation Plan with an estimated "open year" of 2052.	
"Pink Line"/"Silver Line" (former names)	Union Station and Downtown Los Angeles through Hollywood to Beverly Hills terminating at the under construction D Line Century City station. Stops in or near Silver Lake, Dodger Stadium, Echo Park, West Hollywood, and Century City. Mostly a Sunset Boulevard and Santa Monica Boulevard east–west route. Possibly using the already built B Line tracks through Hollywood or the light rail K Line under consideration in West Hollywood. East of Union Station would head to the City of La Puente or El Monte. With possible stops in East Los Angeles, Cal State LA, San Gabriel and Baldwin Park. No LPAs listed. No funds available. Listed as one of several "Strategic Unfunded Plan" project in the 2009 Long Range Transportation Plan, Tier 2. Eastside route no longer met by the removed Eastside Transit Corridor Phase 2 option along State Route 60.	
Harbor Line	Light rail line to connect harbor area (San Pedro) to the A Line or C Line. Floated in LA City Council motions and Metro Harbor Subdivision studies. Also, a further southward extension of the C Line is included as a Tier 1 Strategic Unfunded Plan project in the 2009 Long Range Transportation Plan. Other plans could lead to the J Line being converted to rail.	
D Line Subway Extension Project Section 4	Extend the D Line 3.5 miles (5.6 km) from its under construction western terminus, Westwood/VA Hospital station to Downtown Santa Monica station. No funds available.	
Venice Boulevard Corridor	Restore the Venice Boulevard right of way train service from Venice Beach in the west to the Culver Junction area, possibly heading north on La Brea Avenue to Hollywood or east into Downtown Los Angeles. Would service the Westside and Central Los Angeles. The Pacific Electric Venice Short Line was last used in the 1950s.	

== See also ==
- Los Angeles Metro
- Los Angeles Metro Rail rolling stock
- Breda A650
- Transportation in Los Angeles
- Measure R
- List of metro systems
- List of tram and light rail transit systems
- List of United States rapid transit systems by ridership
- List of United States light rail systems by ridership
