= Transportation systems management =

Transportation systems management (TSM) or transportation systems management and operations (TSMO) is a set of strategies that focus on operational improvements that can maintain and even restore the performance of the existing transportation system before extra capacity is needed. In this context, transportation systems management techniques may include changes to traffic signals, such as coordinating them or introducing ramp metering, or minor changes to road geometry, such as straightening corners or lengthening merge lanes. These low-cost interventions can be very effective in reducing congestion under some circumstances.

Due to the low cost of transportation systems management, it is often included as a reference option in cost-benefit analyses and environmental impact statements for new roadways or mass transit links, such as busways, metros, and light rail lines. It is typically considered in conjunction with the default "no-build" option.

== See also ==
- Intelligent transportation system (ITS)
- Traffic signal preemption
