= Wilshire Federal Building =

Building in Los Angeles, California

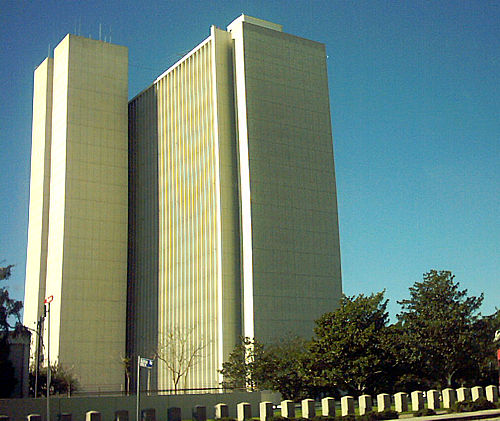

General information
- Architectural style: Modernism
- Location: 11000 Wilshire Boulevard, Sawtelle, California, U.S.
- Coordinates: 34.056295°N 118.448265°W
- Construction started: 1968
- Completed: 1969

Height
- Height: 261 ft (79.43 m)

Design and construction
- Architecture firm: Charles Luckman Associates
- Federal Building
- U.S. National Register of Historic Places
- Area: 28.2 acres (11.4 ha)
- NRHP reference No.: 100005446
- Added to NRHP: August 17, 2020

The Wilshire Federal Building is an office building in Los Angeles, located on Wilshire and Sepulveda Boulevards in the area of Sawtelle. Many of Los Angeles’ federal offices are located in this building. The building actually is not located on municipal Los Angeles land, but in a small (0.90-square-mile (2.3 km^{2})), unincorporated area of Los Angeles County enclosed by the city, known as unincorporated Sawtelle.

The Federal Building is an example of Late Modern architecture. The three buildings that make up this complex form a strong composition of vertical and horizontal elements supported by integrated landscape features such as courtyards, planters, and benches. The architecture uses strong linear elements, a prominent glass curtain wall, equally prominent elements of solid material, industrial material palette, and monumental aesthetic. Construction on the Wilshire Federal Building began in 1968 and was completed in 1969. It is 260.6 feet (79.43 m) high. It was listed on the National Register of Historic Places in 2020.

The building is often the site of protests and demonstrations. For example, during the Iranian Revolution, the Federal Building was the scene of demonstrations both supporting the Revolution and supporting the Shah.

The Federal Bureau of Investigation (FBI) Los Angeles field office is in Suite 1700.

== See also ==
- List of Los Angeles federal buildings
- Los Angeles National Cemetery
- West LA VA
