= AnsaldoBreda P2550 =

American light rail vehicle

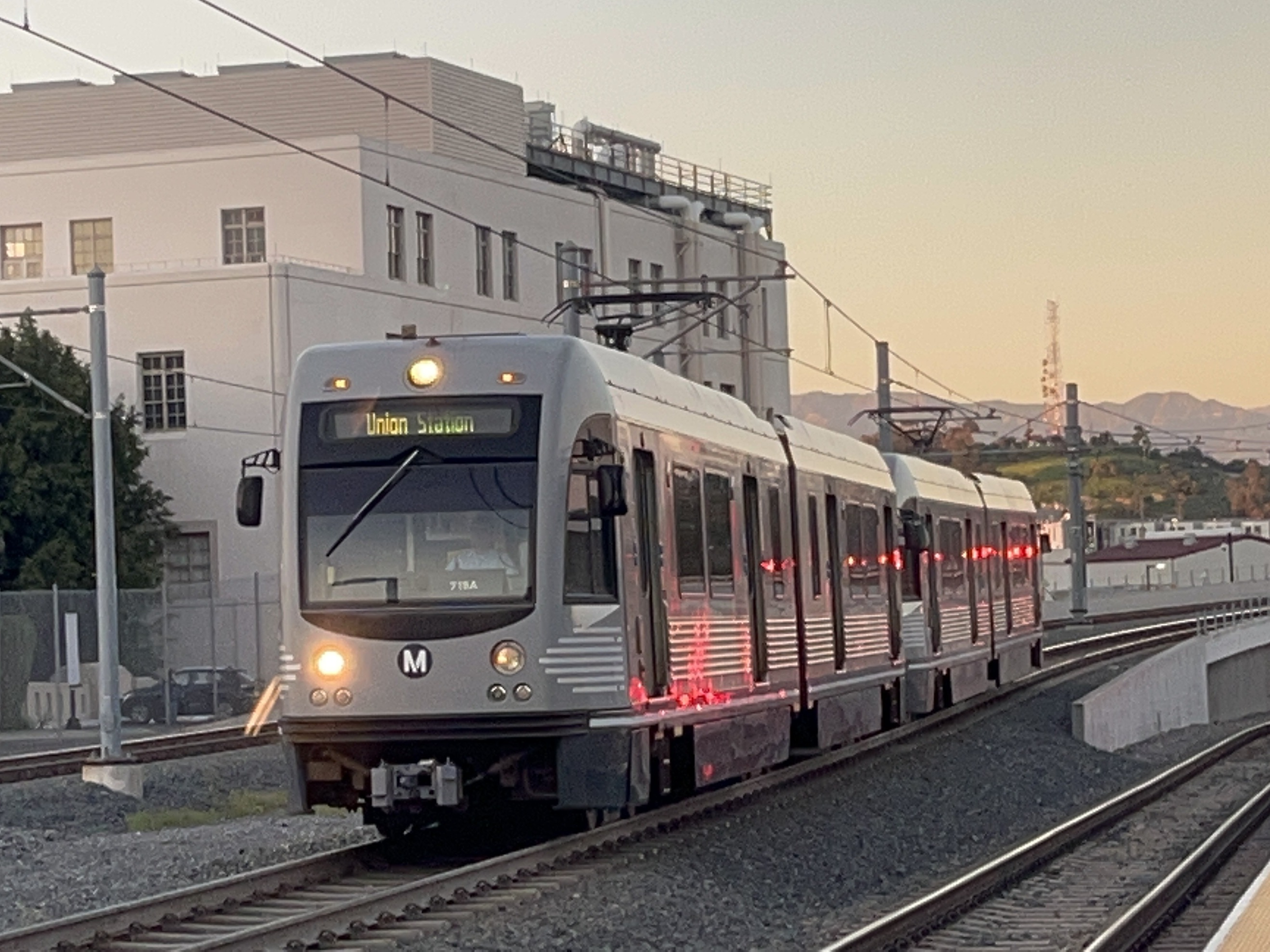
- AnsaldoBreda P2550 train.

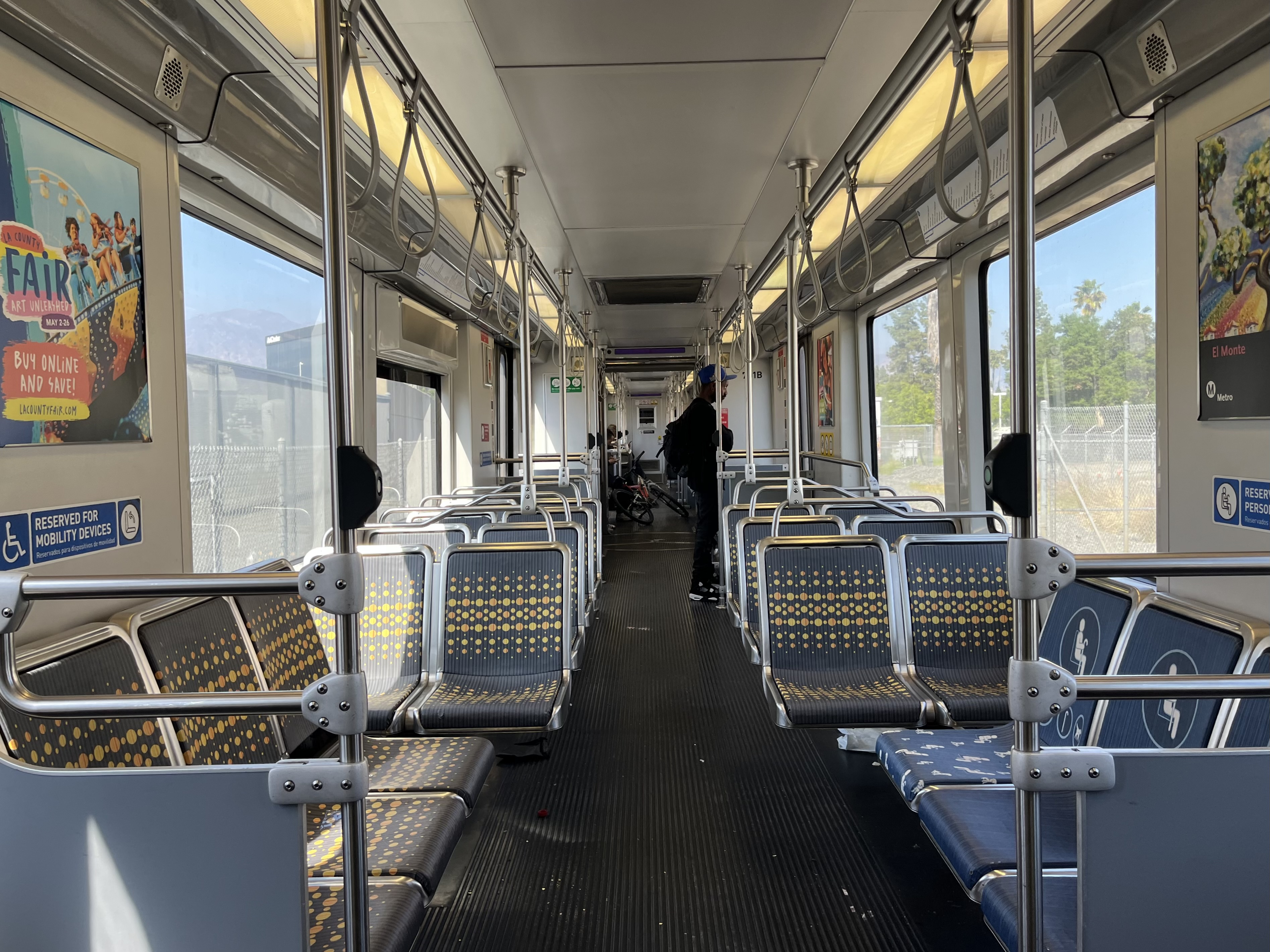
- Interior of P2550
- In service: 2008–present
- Manufacturer: AnsaldoBreda
- Constructed: 2005–2011
- Entered service: 2008–2011
- Refurbished: Kinki Sharyo; 2023–present
- Number built: 50
- Fleet numbers: 701-750
- Capacity: 76 (seated); 141 (standing)
- Depots: Division 11 (Long Beach); Division 14 (Santa Monica); Division 21 (Elysian Park); Division 24 (Monrovia)
- Line served: A Line E Line

Specifications
- Car body construction: Stainless steel
- Car length: 90 ft 0 in (27.43 m)
- Width: 8 ft 8.8 in (2,661 mm)
- Height: 12 ft 3.0 in (3,734 mm)
- Floor height: 39 in (990 mm)
- Entry: Level
- Doors: 8 (4 per side)
- Articulated sections: 2 (one articulation)
- Maximum speed: 75 mph (120 km/h)
- Traction system: IGBT–VVVF inverter AnsaldoBreda (original); AmePower (refurbished)
- Traction motors: 4 × 194 hp (145 kW)
- Power output: 780 hp (580 kW)
- Electric systems: Overhead line, 750 V DC
- Current collection: Faiveley pantograph
- UIC classification: Bo′(2)′Bo′
- AAR wheel arrangement: B-2-B
- Safety system: ATP
- Coupling system: Tomlinson/Dellner
- Track gauge: 4 ft 8 1/2 in (1,435 mm) standard gauge

The AnsaldoBreda P2550 is an articulated high-floor electric light rail vehicle manufactured by AnsaldoBreda for the Los Angeles County Metropolitan Transportation Authority's Metro Rail system. 50 vehicles were built between 2005 and 2011, with the first entering service in 2008.

== Background ==
In 2001, the Los Angeles County Metropolitan Transportation Authority (LACMTA) began seeking bids for a new order of light rail vehicles for the Gold Line. Four companies submitted proposals; Bombardier, Kinki Sharyo, Siemens, and AnsaldoBreda. Siemens's proposal did not meet LACMTA requirements, and Bombardier declined to bid due to the terms of the contract.

AnsaldoBreda's bid was lower than that of Kinki-Sharyo, and as a result, on April 24, 2003, LACMTA awarded a contract to AnsaldoBreda for the production of 50 new light rail vehicles at a cost of $158 million, with options for a further 100 vehicles. All trains were to be delivered by 2007.

== Construction ==
Bodyshells for the cars were built in Pistoia, Italy, with final assembly in Pittsburg, California. The first vehicles were delivered to Metro in 2005 and were first tested on the Blue Line before becoming exclusive to the Gold Line. Trains first entered service in May 2008, significantly behind the contracted schedule. By 2009, delivery of trains was around three years behind schedule, and Metro alleged that trains were at least 5,000 lb (2,300 kg) overweight. AnsaldoBreda offered to supply Metro with 50 additional trains at a cost of $300 million, with an additional 2 trains as compensation for delivery delays.

Metro decided not to exercise their options to purchase additional P2550 vehicles from AnsaldoBreda, and ordered 235 Kinki-Sharyo P3010 vehicles in 2012. Following the difficulties of the P2550 procurement process, LACMTA revised its quality control procedures for new rolling stock, and began using best value procurement for future contracts.

== Service history ==
Kinki Sharyo is refurbishing the fleet at their Palmdale, California facility, beginning in 2023 with Car 721. Components to be upgraded include doors, safety systems, trucks, and climate control systems. The first of the refurbished units began revenue service in April 2026.

From the beginning of Spring 2023, the P2550 became available to the original A Line (Los Angeles—Long Beach) outside of the former L Line as a result of the completed rail construction and later opening of the Regional Connector.

== See also ==
- Nippon Sharyo P865
- Siemens P2000
- Kinki Sharyo P3010
