= Los Angeles Metro =

Public transport agency in Los Angeles County, California, United States

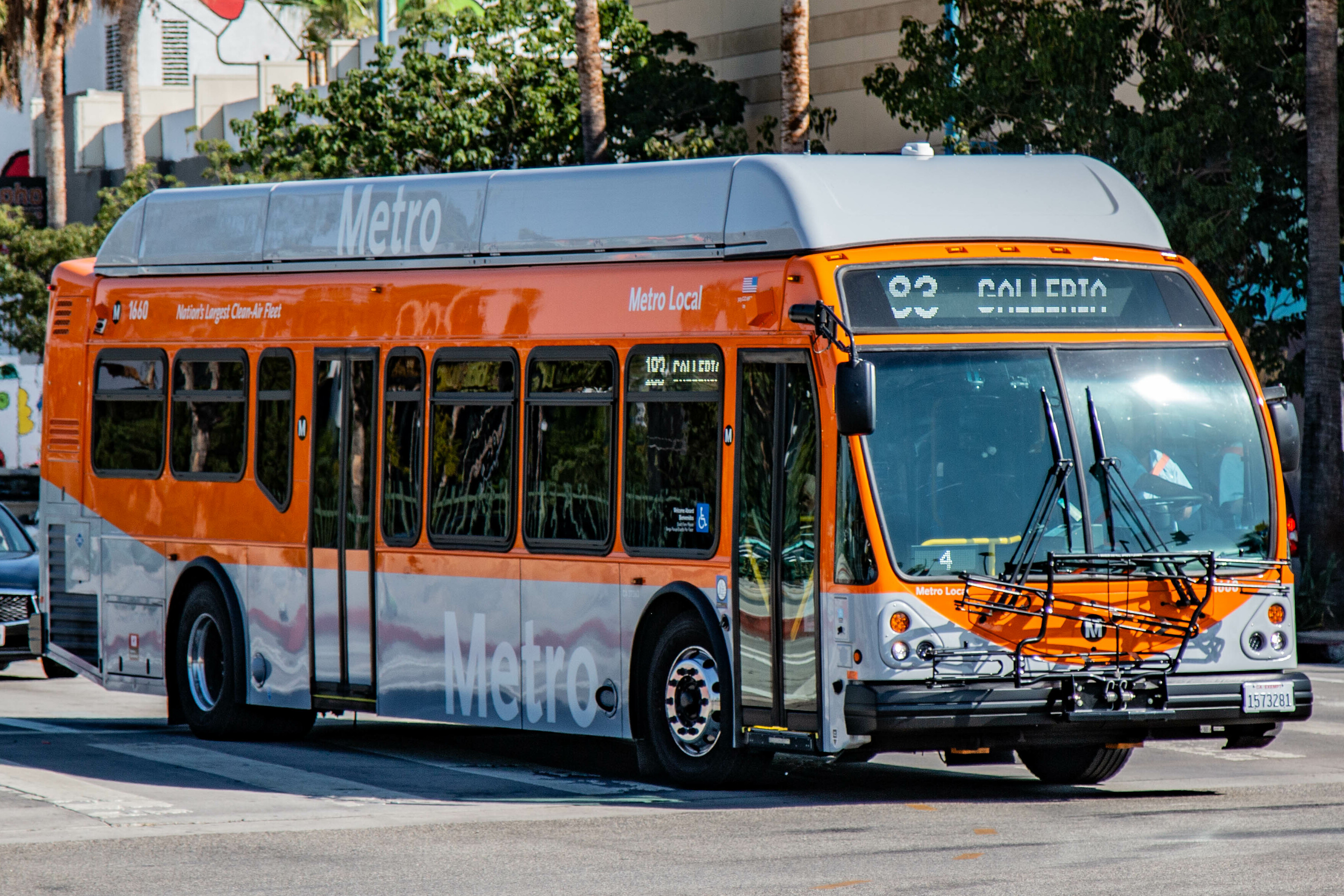
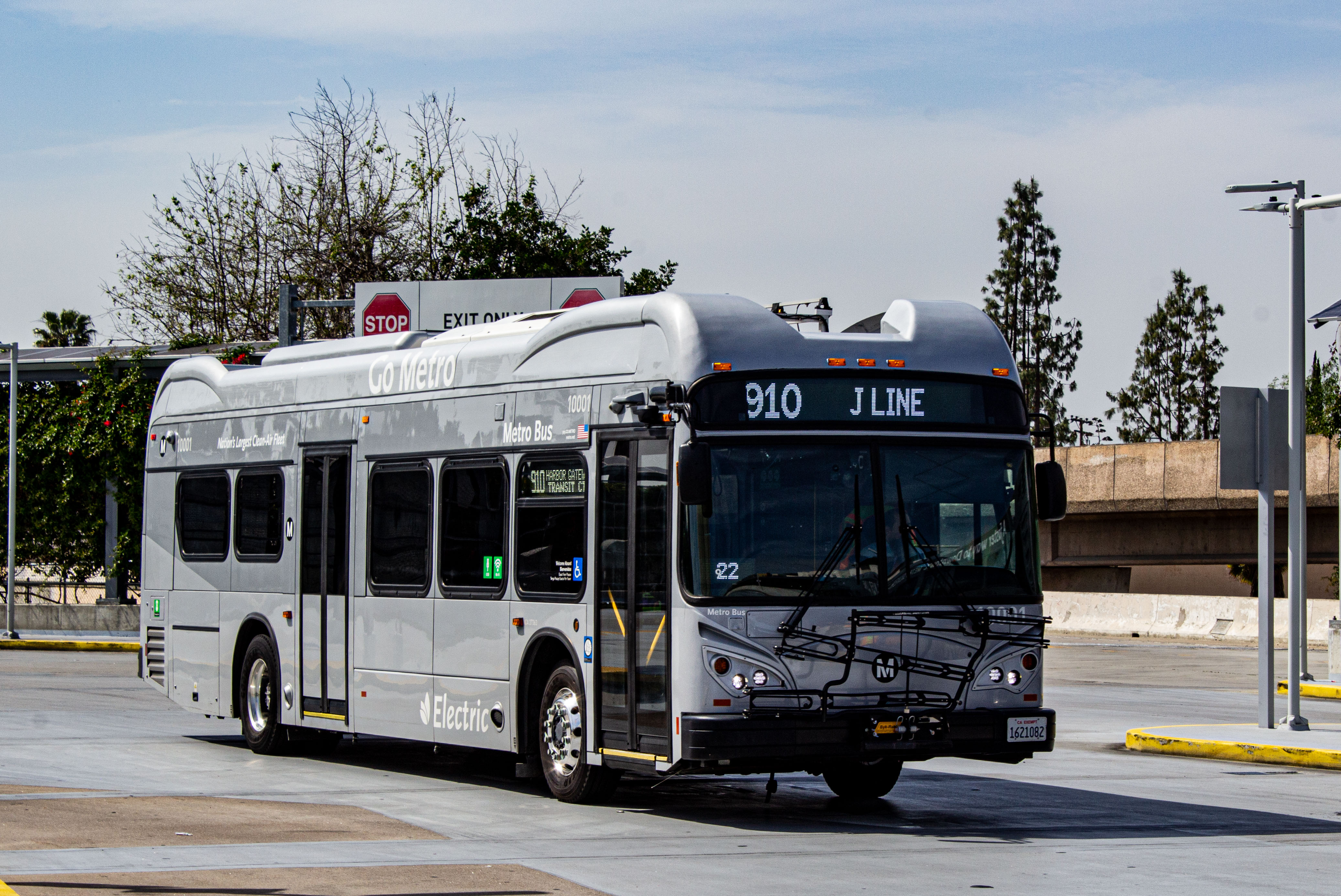
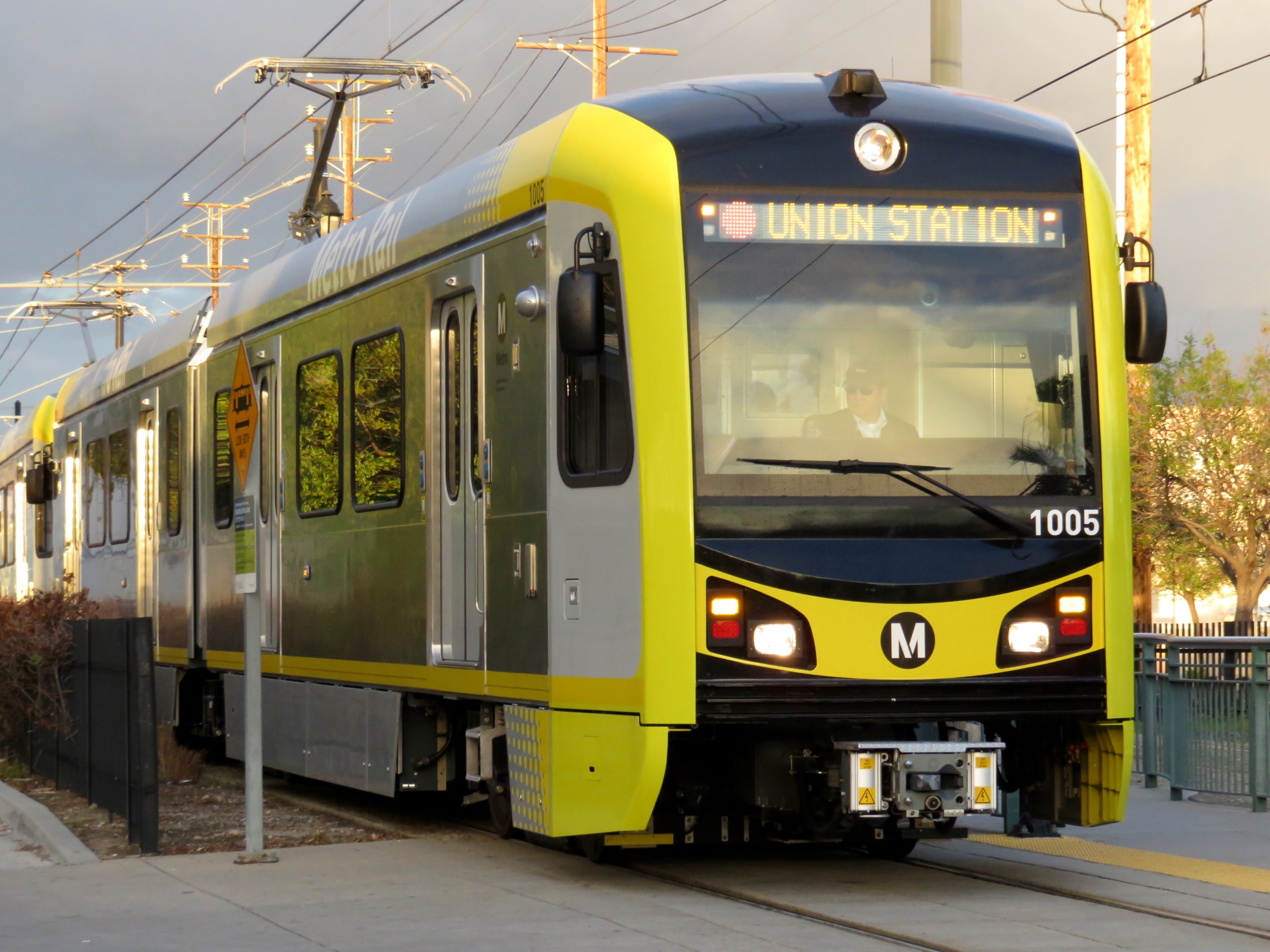
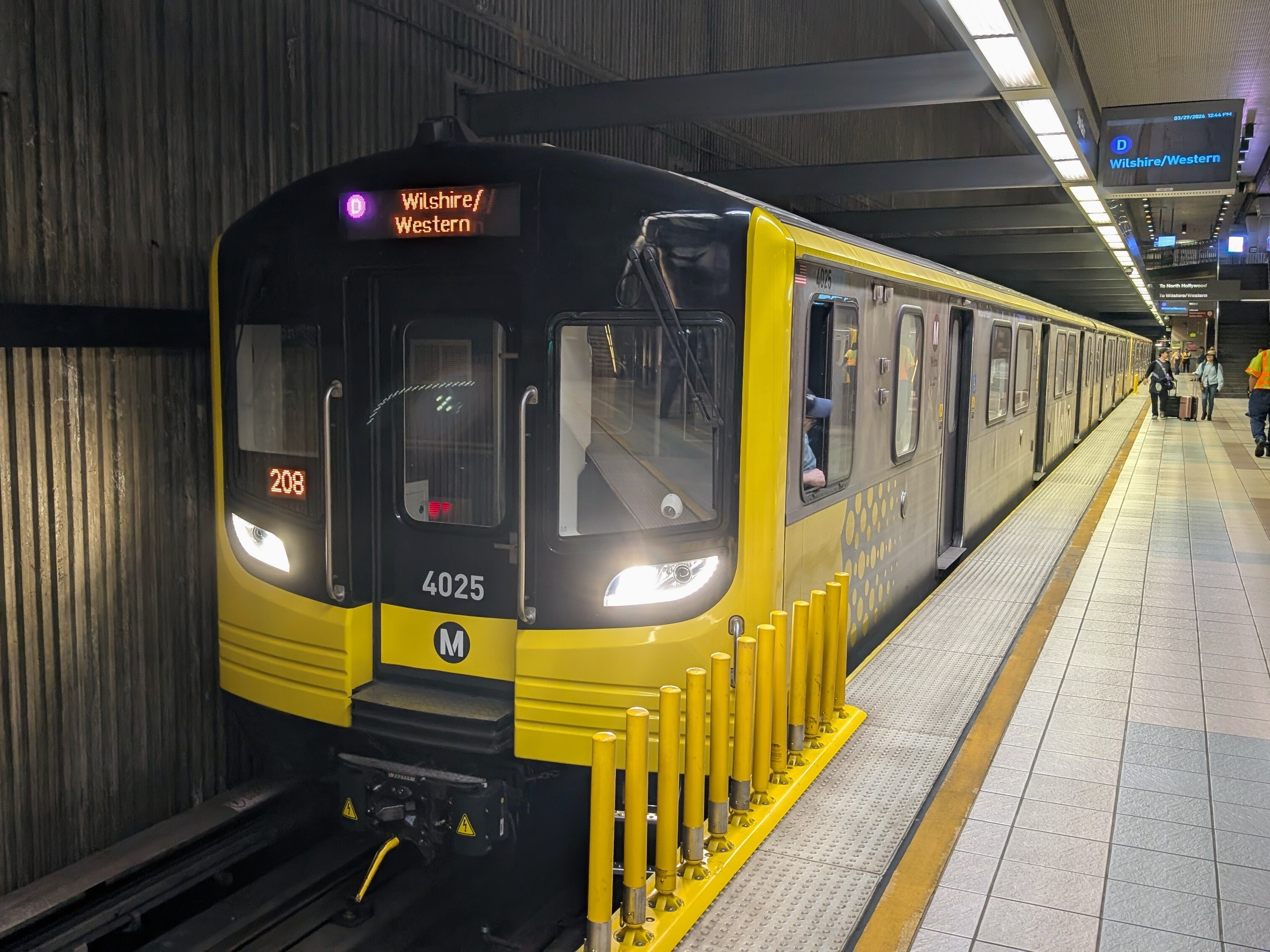
- Clockwise from top left: Metro Bus, Metro Busway, Metro Rail subway, and Metro Rail light rail

Overview
- Locale: Los Angeles County, California
- Transit type: Bus; Bus rapid transit; Light rail; Subways; Paratransit; Microtransit
- Number of lines: Bus: 117; Bus rapid transit: 2; Light rail: 4; Subway: 2
- Number of stations: Rail: 110; Bus: 11,840
- Daily ridership: 970,600 (weekdays, Q2 2026)
- Annual ridership: 305,706,300 (2025)
- Chief executive: Stephanie Wiggins
- Headquarters: Metro Headquarters Building; One Gateway Plaza; Los Angeles, California
- Website: www.metro.net

Operation
- Began operation: February 1, 1993; 33 years ago

Technical
- System length: Rail: 125.1 mi (201.3 km); Bus: 1,440 mi (2,320 km)

The Los Angeles County Metropolitan Transportation Authority (LACMTA), branded as Metro, is the state agency that plans, operates, and coordinates funding for most of the transportation system in Los Angeles County, California, the most populated county in the United States.

Metro directly operates a large public transit system that includes bus, bus rapid transit, light rail, and rapid transit services. The agency also provides funding for transit it does not operate, including Metrolink commuter rail, municipal bus operators and paratransit services. The agency also provides funding and directs planning for the Los Angeles freeway system and railroad projects within the county. The agency is distinct from and not a part of the county government, instead being a separate state agency.

In 2025, the Metro system had a total ridership of 305,706,300, and had a ridership of 970,600 per weekday as of the second quarter of 2026. It is the largest transit agency by ridership in the state of California, and the second-largest in the United States after the New York City Transit Authority.

== Background ==
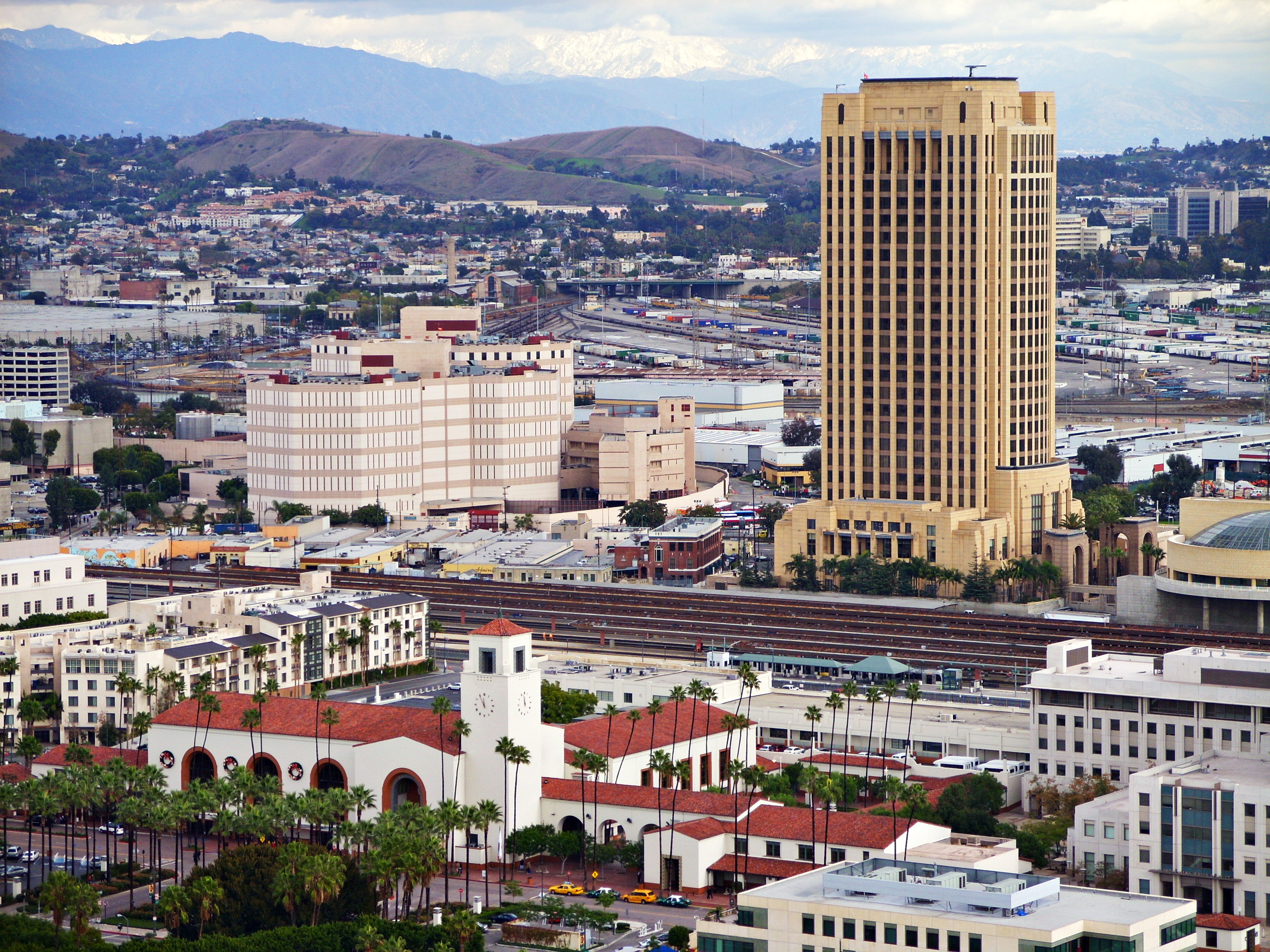
The Metro Headquarters Building, a high-rise office tower located next to Los Angeles Union Station

Metro was formed on February 1, 1993, by the California State Legislature which merged two rival agencies: the Southern California Rapid Transit District (RTD) and the Los Angeles County Transportation Commission (LACTC).

The RTD was founded on August 18, 1964, to operate most public transportation in the urbanized Southern California region, including Los Angeles, San Bernardino, Orange, and Riverside counties. RTD replaced the major predecessor public agency, the Los Angeles Metropolitan Transit Authority, and took over eleven failing other bus companies and services in the Southern California region. Services outside of Los Angeles County began to be divested in the early 1980s.

The LACTC began operation in 1977 after a state requirement that all counties form local transportation commissions. Its main objective was to be the guardian of all transportation funding, both transit and highway, for Los Angeles County.

The bickering between the two agencies came to a head in the 1980s. At that time, the LACTC was building the Blue Line (now A Line) light rail line between Los Angeles and Long Beach, while the RTD was building the Red Line (now B Line) subway in Downtown Los Angeles. It was revealed that due to disputes between the agencies, the LACTC was planning to end the Blue Line at Pico Station, instead of serving the 7th Street/Metro Center station being built by the RTD six blocks north.

Metro has assumed the functions of both agencies and now develops and oversees transportation plans, policies, funding programs, and both short-term and long-range solutions to mobility, accessibility and environmental needs in the county. The agency is also the primary public transit provider for the city of Los Angeles, the second largest city in the United States, providing the bulk of such services, even though the city's own Los Angeles Department of Transportation (LADOT) operates a smaller bus only public transit system of its own called DASH within the MTA service area in the city of Los Angeles, often overlapping with some Metro Bus routes and stops in several neighborhoods primarily in the central part of the city.

Since 1995, the agency has been based out of the Metro Headquarters Building, a 26-story high-rise office tower located next to Los Angeles Union Station, a major transportation hub and the main train station for the Los Angeles metropolitan area, which it has also owned since purchasing it in 2011.

Metro operates the second-largest public transportation system in the United States by ridership with a 1,433 mi^{2} (3,711 km^{2}) operating area and 2,000 peak hour buses on the street any given business day. Metro also operates 125.1 miles (201.3 km) of urban rail service. Metro has 10,290 employees, making it one of the region's largest employers.

Metro also partially funds sixteen municipal bus operators and an array of transportation projects including bikeways and pedestrian facilities, local roads and highway improvements, goods movement, Metrolink regional commuter rail, freeway service patrol, and freeway call boxes within Los Angeles County.

To increase sustainability in transportation services, Metro also provides bike and pedestrian improvements for the over 10.1 million residents of Los Angeles County.

Security and law enforcement services on Metro property (including buses and trains) are currently provided by the Transit Services Bureau via contract, in conjunction with Metro Transit Enforcement Department and the Los Angeles Police Department (Union Station and all Metro rail services within the City of Los Angeles).

Since 2024, Metro has partnered with Throne Labs to install portable toilets at its rail and busway stations.

== Services ==
=== Metro Rail ===
Metro Rail is an urban rail transit system with four light rail lines and two rapid transit lines. As of May 2026, the system runs a total of 125.1 miles (201.3 km), with 110 stations.

A Line is a light rail line running between Pomona and Long Beach via Downtown Los Angeles.
B Line is a rapid transit line running between North Hollywood and Downtown Los Angeles.
C Line is a light rail line running between Westchester and Norwalk, largely in the median of Interstate 105. It provides direct access to Los Angeles International Airport via the LAX/Metro Transit Center.
D Line is a rapid transit line running between Beverly Hills and Downtown Los Angeles. As of May 2026, the line is currently being extended westward.
E Line is a light rail line running between Santa Monica and East Los Angeles via Downtown Los Angeles.
K Line is a light rail line running between Expo/Crenshaw and Redondo Beach via Westchester. It also provides direct access to Los Angeles International Airport via the LAX/Metro Transit Center.

=== Metro Bus ===
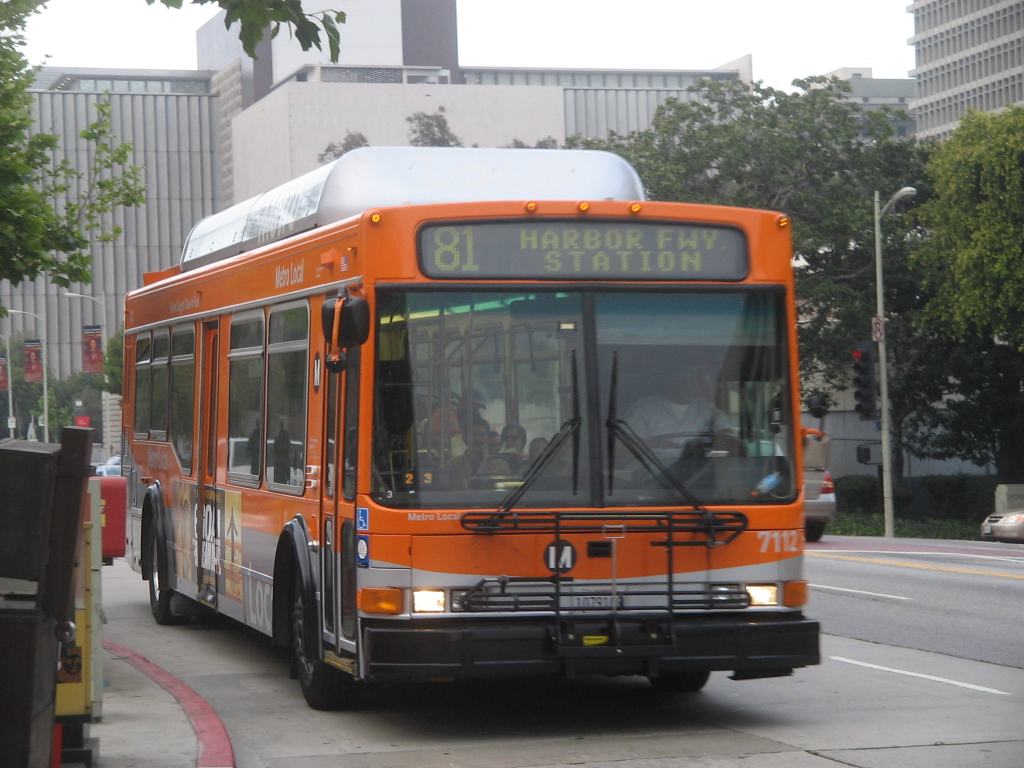
Metro Bus on Line 81

Metro is the primary bus operator in the Los Angeles Basin, the San Fernando Valley, and the western San Gabriel Valley until Arcadia going east. Other regions of Los Angeles County, including the Antelope Valley and the eastern San Gabriel Valley, are served by separate bus operators, which receive some funding from Metro.

As of June 2023, the Metro Bus system includes 117 routes, serving over 11,000 bus stops. Most Metro Bus lines are local services, stopping at marked stops approximately every two blocks. Limited-stop Metro Rapid services stop only at major intersections, and Metro Express services utilize the extensive Southern California freeways to provide nonstop service between regional destinations.

=== Metro Busway ===
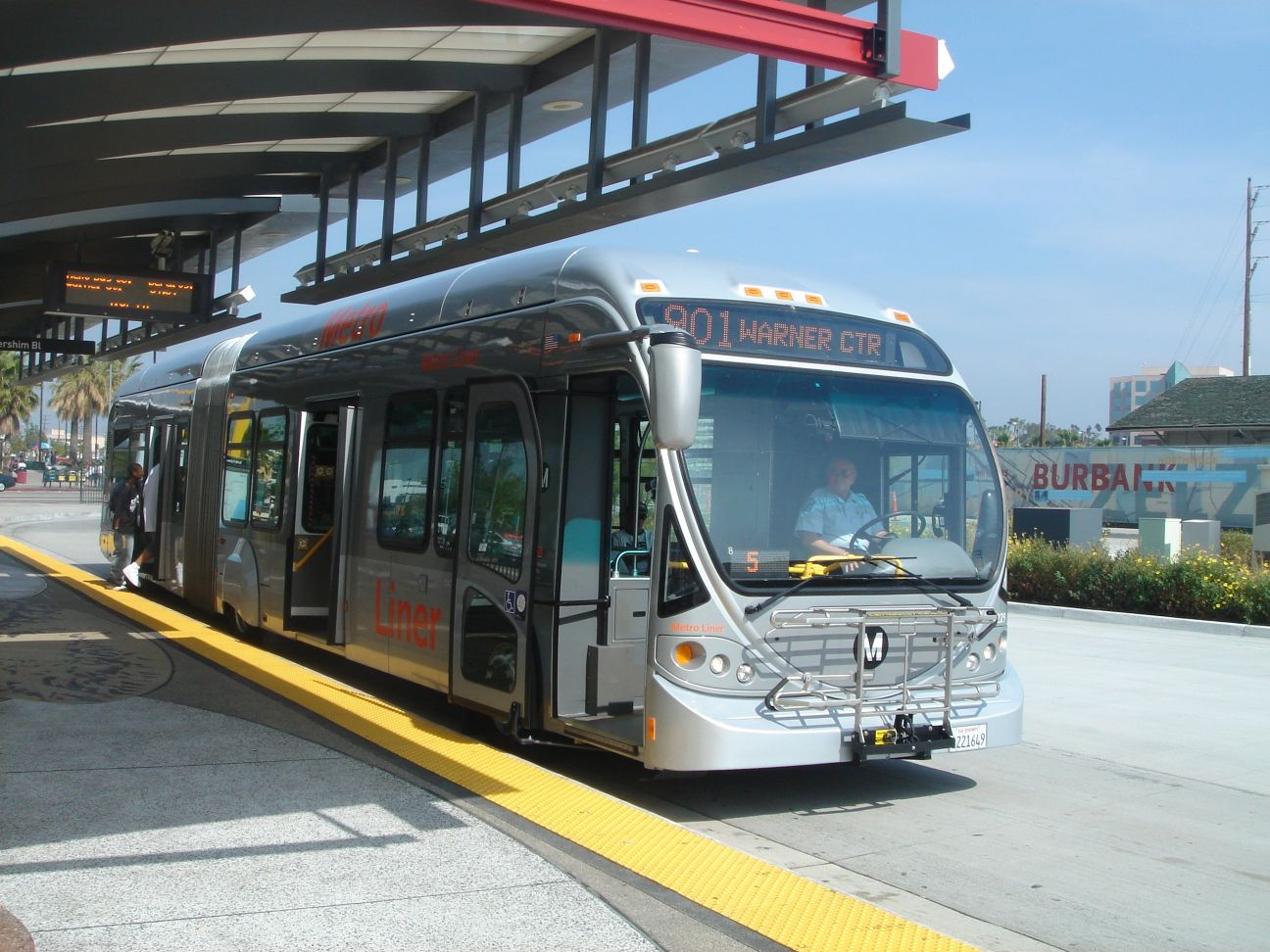
A Metro Liner vehicle at the North Hollywood station on the Orange Line.

Metro Busway is a bus rapid transit system with two lines operating on dedicated or shared-use busways. The system runs a total of 55.7 miles (89.6 km), with 29 stations and over 42,000 daily weekday boardings as of May 2016.

The Metro Busway system is meant to mimic the Metro Rail system, both in the vehicle's design and in the operation of the line. Vehicles stop at dedicated stations (except for the portion of the Metro J Line in Downtown Los Angeles), vehicles receive priority at intersections and are painted in a silver livery similar to Metro Rail vehicles.

G Line is a bus rapid transit line running between Chatsworth and North Hollywood. Some trips terminate in Canoga Park.
J Line is a bus rapid transit line running between El Monte, Downtown Los Angeles, and Harbor Gateway, with some trips continuing to San Pedro.

=== Busways ===
The Metro Busway J Line operates over two busways, semi-exclusive roadways built into the Southern California freeway system. These busways are also used by other bus routes to speed up their trips.

- The El Monte Busway is a combination busway and high-occupancy toll (HOT) roadway that runs in the median of the San Bernardino Freeway (I-10) and on a separate right-of-way. The busway provides express bus service between Downtown LA and the San Gabriel Valley. Services on the busway are operated by both Metro and Foothill Transit.
- The Harbor Transitway is a combination busway and HOT roadway that runs in the median of the Harbor Freeway (I-110). The busway provides express bus service between San Pedro and Downtown LA. Services on the busway are operated by Metro, LADOT, and Torrance Transit.

=== Other services ===
- Metro Art: A program of Los Angeles Metro that commissions and integrates public art into Metro stations and facilities to enhance the transit experience of Los Angeles County.
- Metro Bike Share: A bicycle-sharing system in Downtown LA, Central LA, Hollywood, North Hollywood and on the Westside.
- Metro ExpressLanes: High-occupancy toll lanes on the El Monte Busway and Harbor Transitway.
- Metro Freeway Service Patrol: A joint effort between Metro, Caltrans, and the California Highway Patrol offering free quick-fix repairs and towing from freeways.
- Metro Micro: An on-demand transit service, operated using vans in 8 zones around the region
- Bike paths: 475 miles (764 km) of bike facilities for commuter and recreational purposes.
- HOV (Carpool) Lanes: 219 miles (352 km), 423 miles (681 km) both directions/each lane, of carpool, vanpool, and express bus lanes.
- Metrolink: Partially funded by Metro, it is Southern California's regional commuter rail system.
- Pacific Surfliner: Partially funded by Metro. Metro has two board seats in the LOSSAN Rail Corridor Agency

=== Fares and fare collection ===
The base fare for Metro services, including local and express buses and Metro Rail, is $1.75. Metro introduced daily and 7-day fare caps in July 2023, replacing upfront rolling daily and 7-day passes, while rolling 30-day passes were axed entirely, and as a result, the only unlimited travel options available are the daily and 7-day fare caps. With fare capping, the cost of each trip is credited towards the cost of a daily or 7-day unlimited pass, automatically ensuring that all passengers pay the lowest fare possible. Discounted or free fares are available for seniors, disabled individuals, Medicare recipients, low-income individuals, and students.

The primary method of payment for Metro fares is the TAP card, a contactless stored-value card. TAP cards are valid on Metro buses and trains, and on 26 other transit agencies in Los Angeles County. TAP cards are required for Metro Rail trips, free bus transfers, and fare capping; however, single-ride bus fares can still be paid in cash. TAP cards can be purchased at station fare machines, local vendors, online, and at Metro Customer Care Centers.

Before the start of the 2026 World Cup, Metro has also allowed contactless payment for bus and train fares, along with other participating LA County transit services.

Fare gates are installed at all B, C, D and K Line stations, along with select A and E Line stations. Fare gates were added after 2007 to reduce fare evasion. At the time, the decision was criticized for its cost and perceived ineffectiveness.

K-12 and community college students who attend participating schools within the Los Angeles Area can enroll in the Metro's GoPass program, cutting the already discounted fares to unlimited free rides for such students. The program is not limited to LA Metro services, and is accepted by 15 other transit systems in Los Angeles County. The program began as a two-year pilot program in 2021, was granted a one-year extension then was announced as permanent in April 2024.

Fare type	Regular	Senior (62+)/ Disabled/ Medicare	Student (K-12/College/ Vocational) (without GoPass)	Student (with GoPass)	Low Income (LIFE)
Base fare	$1.75	$0.35 (off-peak) $0.75 (peak)	$0.75	Free	20 free rides, then regular fare
1-day cap	$5	$2.50	$2.50	Free	20 free rides, then regular fare
7-day cap	$18	$5	$6	Free	20 free rides, then regular fare
Metro-to-Muni transfer	$0.50	$0.25	$0.50		—

=== Security ===
Metro contracted security efforts to the Los Angeles Police Department (LAPD), Los Angeles Sheriff's Department, and the Long Beach Police Department. On June 27, 2024, the Metro board voted to form an independent police force for the transit system in order to reduce costs and address increasing violence against bus and rail operators.

On May 7, 2025, former San Francisco police chief William "Bill" Scott was announced as chief of Metro's police.

On March 7, 2023, Metro introduced the Ambassador Program. Ambassadors wear bright green and serve to provide information and to report and resolve issues. Ambassadors are positioned on busier rail and bus lines and stations.

== Ridership ==
Weekday mode share in 2025
1. B & D Lines (6.50%)
2. A Line (6.90%)
3. C Line (2.00%)
4. E Line (5.20%)
5. K Line (0.70%)
6. G Line (1.30%)
7. J Line (1.60%)
8. Metro Bus (75.8%)

The Metro A Line has the highest ridership of all Metro Rail lines and also the lowest operational cost because of its high ridership. The Metro Rail Metro K Line has the lowest ridership of all letter-branded lines. Average daily boardings and passenger miles for all of 2025 are as follows:

Service	Weekdays	Saturdays	Sundays and Holidays	Average Weekday Passenger Miles
Heavy Rail
B Line; D Line	62,184	49,558	44,091	310,396
Light Rail
A Line	66,415	53,358	44,126	527,265
C Line	18,942	13,566	12,098	123,968
E Line	50,003	41,297	33,542	329,812
K Line	7,116	5,615	5,292	22,454
Bus and BRT
Metro Bus	728,558	507,786	426,833	2,439,843
G Line	12,507	8,178	7,045	72,621
J Line	15,599	8,677	7,212	135,677
Total Bus and Rail	933,218	671,181	565,982	3,753,738

== Governance ==
Day-to-day operations of Metro is overseen by Chief Executive Officer Stephanie Wiggins. Metro is a state-chartered county transportation commission governed by a board of directors with 14 members, 13 of whom are voting members. The Board is composed of:

- The five members of the Los Angeles County Board of Supervisors
- The mayor of the city of Los Angeles
- Three people appointed by the mayor of Los Angeles, at least one of whom must be member of the Los Angeles City Council.
- Four city council members or mayors from LA County cities other than Los Angeles, who each represent one region of the county: San Gabriel/Pomona Valley, Arroyo/Verdugo, Gateway Cities and Westside Cities
- One non-voting member appointed by the Governor of California (traditionally the Director of Caltrans District 7)

While the Metro board makes decisions on large issues, they rely on Service Councils to advise on smaller decisions, such as on bus stop placement and over bus service changes. To enable this work, the councils call and conduct public hearings, evaluate Metro programs in their area, and meet with management staff. There are five Service Councils, each representing a different region: Gateway Cities, San Fernando Valley, San Gabriel Valley, South Bay, and Westside/Central. Each council is led by a board composed of a political appointees.

Members of Metro staff also sit on the boards of other joint powers authorities across the region, including the LOSSAN Rail Corridor Agency, the Alameda Corridor Transportation Authority, the Foothill Gold Line Construction Authority, the Southern California Regional Rail Authority, the High Desert Corridor Joint Powers Agency, and the Inglewood Transit Connector Joint Powers Authority.

=== Board of Directors ===
Chair

- Karen Bass, Mayor of the City of Los Angeles

Vice Chair

- Kathryn Barger, Los Angeles County Board Supervisor, District 5

2nd Vice Chair

- Tim Sandoval, Appointee of Los Angeles County City Selection Committee, San Gabriel Valley sector, Mayor of Pomona

Executive Board Members

- James T. Butts Jr., Appointee of Los Angeles County City Selection Committee, Southwest Corridor sector, Mayor of Inglewood
- Jacquelyn Dupont-Walker, Appointee of the Mayor of the City of Los Angeles
- Janice Hahn, Los Angeles County Board Supervisor, District 4
- Lindsey Horvath, Los Angeles County Board Supervisor, District 3
- Holly Mitchell, Los Angeles County Board Supervisor, District 2
- Vacant (Note: Seat previously held by Ara Najarian, City of Glendale, At Large District.), Appointee of Los Angeles County City Selection Committee, North County/San Fernando Valley sector,
- Imelda Padilla, Appointee of the Mayor of the City of Los Angeles, District 6
- Rex Richardson, Appointee of Los Angeles County City Selection Committee, Southeast Long Beach sector, Mayor of Long Beach
- Hilda Solis, Los Angeles County Board Supervisor, District 1
- Katy Yaroslavsky, Appointee of the Mayor of the City of Los Angeles, District 5

Ex-officio Board Member

- Gloria Roberts, Appointee of the Governor of California, Caltrans District 7 Director

== Funding ==
A complex mix of federal, state, county and city tax dollars as well as bonds and fare box revenue funds Metro.

The Metro budget for 2020 is $7.2 billion. Below is the funding breakdown from Metro's fiscal year 2020 budget:

Revenues	US$ in Millions 2020
Proposition A (0.5% sales tax)	873
Proposition C (0.5% sales tax)	873
Measure R (0.5% sales tax)	873
Measure M (0.5% sales tax)	873
Transportation Development Act (0.25% sales tax)	436.5
State Transit Assistance ("Diesel Tax")	215.8
SB 1 State of Good Repair Funding ("Gas Tax")	30.1
Metro Passenger Fares	284.5
Metro ExpressLanes Tolls	58.4
Advertising	25.6
Other Revenues	71.2
Grants Reimbursements	1,184.8
Bond Proceeds & Prior Year Carryover	1,408.6
Total Resources (US$ millions)	7,207.6

== Jurisdiction ==
The agency is a public transportation and planning agency that lies under the jurisdiction of the State of California. Although it falls under State regulations, it can also partake in regional and municipal levels of rule during a transportation development project. For example, it can play a role in policies regarding a state's housing policies, since the living situation of one affects the methods of transportation its residents will take.

This transit agency can measure successful projects through key pointers such as low income ridership increase and an increase of favorable environmental and health factors for its public community. Increased low income ridership is a significant factor because that focus group tends to makes up the majority of public transit ridership. Favorable environmental and health factors are also relevant factors because they indicate a positive relationship within the space developed and its residents.

== Fleet ==
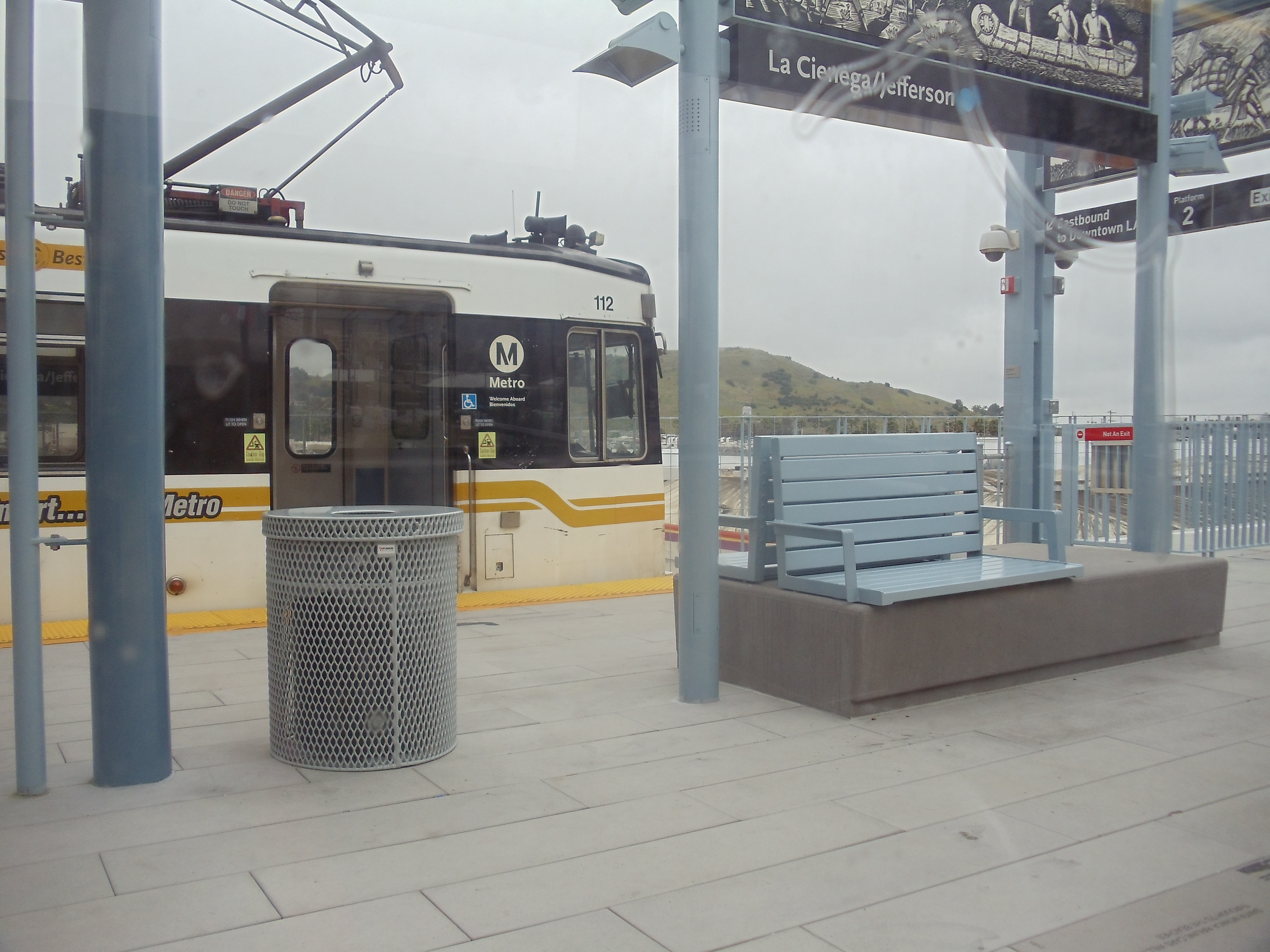
E Line train arriving at La Cienega/Jefferson station, 2012.

Most of Metro's bus fleet is powered by compressed natural gas (CNG), the largest such fleet in the United States. Using CNG reduces emissions of particulates by 90%, carbon monoxide by 80%, and greenhouse gases by 20% compared to diesel powered buses. The agency is also operating a substantial number of battery electric buses, notably on the G Line busway which has seen all CNG buses replaced with battery electric ones, and has plans to convert into a fully electric bus system. Buses feature on-board visual displays and automatic voice announcement systems that announce the next stop.

The Metro Rail fleet is broken down into two main types: light rail vehicles and rapid transit cars (commonly called subway cars in Los Angeles). Metro's light rail vehicles, used on the A, C, E, and K lines, are 87-foot (26.52 m) articulated, high-floor double-ended cars, powered by overhead catenary lines, which typically run in two or three car consists. The light rail lines consist of the Kinki Sharyo P3010, Siemens P2000, and the Ansaldobreda P2550. Metro's retired LRV fleet is the Nippon Sharyo P865/P2020 fleet. Metro’s subway cars, used on the B and D Lines, are 75-foot (22.86 m) electric multiple unit, married-pair cars, powered by electrified third rail consisting of the CRRC HR4000 and the Breda A650 fleet, that typically run in four or six car consists.

== Future ==
=== D Line Extension ===
Section 1 of the D Line Extension added three new subway stations to the D Line at Wilshire/La Brea, Wilshire/Fairfax, and Wilshire/La Cienega. They opened on May 8, 2026. Section 2 to Century City is expected to be completed in 2026, followed by Section 3 to Westwood in 2027.

=== Los Angeles Aerial Rapid Transit ===
Metro, in partnership with LA Aerial Rapid Transit Technologies LLC, is currently proposing to construct an aerial gondola system to connect Dodger Stadium and the stadium's surrounding communities to Union Station in Downtown Los Angeles. When completed, the gondola is expected to have the capacity to transport 5,000 people per hour per direction, with a travel time of approximately seven minutes. The project is expected to make several improvements to the nearby Los Angeles State Historic Park.

=== Long-range Measure M plans ===
Measure M, passed in November 2016, extends and increases the Measure R 30-year half-cent sales tax to a permanent one-cent sales tax. This tax is expected to fund $120 billion in highway and transit projects over 40 years. The tax is also expected to support over 778,000 jobs in the Los Angeles area and $79.3 billion in economic output.

Projects to be funded by Measure M, not previously mentioned above, include:

- A streetcar in Downtown Los Angeles
- The Los Angeles County portion of the High Desert Corridor: a freeway, rail transit, and bikeway corridor linking cities in the Antelope and Victor Valleys. Caltrans put the freeway on hold in 2019.
- Bus Rapid Transit connecting the G and B Lines in North Hollywood with the A Line in Pasadena
- Conversion of the G Line from Bus Rapid Transit to Light Rail
- Light Rail along Van Nuys Boulevard to San Fernando (East San Fernando Valley Light Rail Transit Project)
- Light Rail along the West Santa Ana Branch from Union Station to Artesia
- Bus Rapid Transit along Vermont Avenue between the B Line at Hollywood Boulevard and the C Line at 120th Street.
- Eastern extension of the A Line to the Claremont Metrolink station
- Southern extension of the K Line to Torrance Transit Center
- Eastern extension of the C Line to the Norwalk/Santa Fe Springs Metrolink station
- Heavy Rail tunnel underneath the Sepulveda Pass linking the G Line in the San Fernando Valley and the D Line at Westwood/UCLA
- Heavy Rail or Monorail extension from the D line at Westwood/UCLA to LAX
- Extension of the E Line from East Los Angeles with a branch to Whittier next to the San Gabriel River
- Bus Rapid Transit from LAX to the E Line at Santa Monica along Lincoln Boulevard.
- Bus Rapid Transit in the North San Fernando Valley (downgraded to local bus improvements)

== See also ==
- Transportation in Los Angeles
- List of Los Angeles Metro Rail stations
- List of Los Angeles Metro Busway stations
- Tap card
- List of former Metro Express routes

People

- Hal Bernson, former Authority chairman
