= Kinki Sharyo P3010 =

Light rail vehicle

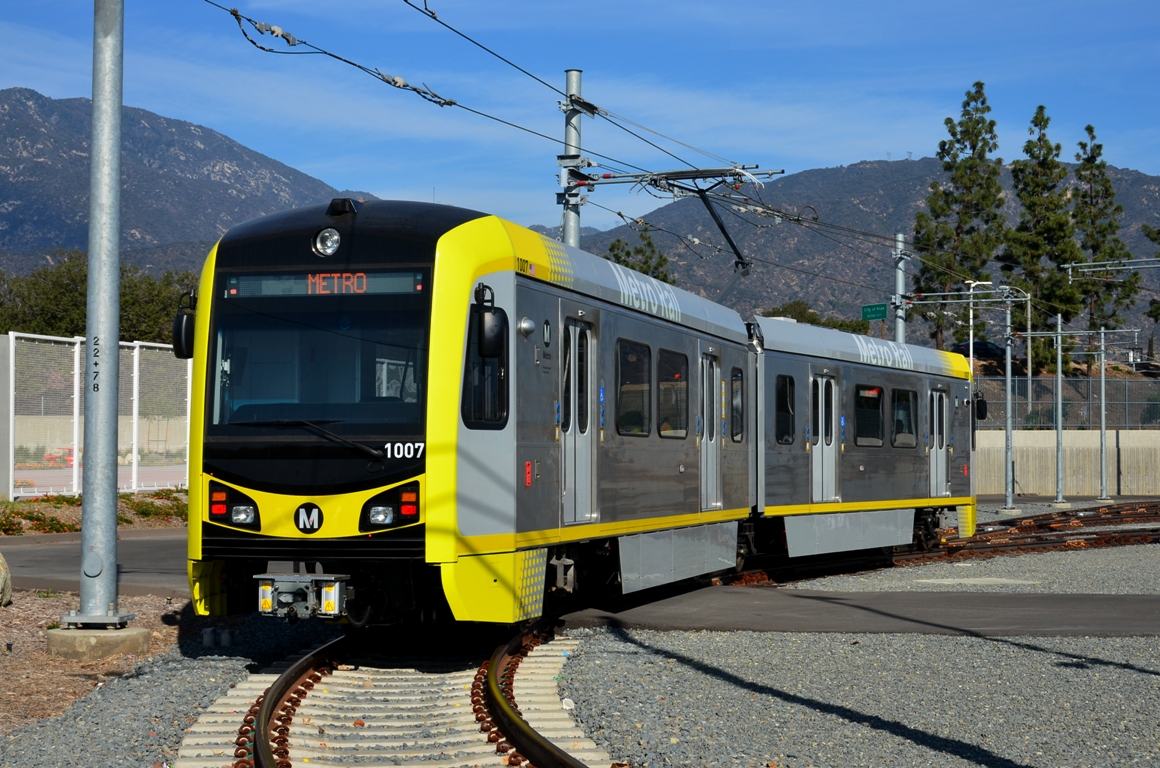
- Kinki Sharyo P3010 LRV
- In service: 2016–present
- Manufacturer: Kinki Sharyo
- Assembly: Palmdale, California, US
- Built at: Osaka, Japan
- Replaced: Nippon Sharyo P865 & P2020
- Constructed: 2014–2020
- Entered service: 2016–2022
- Number built: 235
- Fleet numbers: 1001–1235
- Capacity: 68 seats
- Depots: Division 11 (Long Beach); Division 14 (Santa Monica); Division 16 (Westchester); Division 21 (Elysian Park); Division 22 (Hawthorne); Division 24 (Monrovia)
- Line served: A Line C Line E Line K Line

Specifications
- Car body construction: Stainless steel and LAHT composite
- Car length: 89 ft (27.13 m)
- Width: 8 ft 8 3/4 in (2.66 m)
- Height: 12 ft 6 in (3.81 m)
- Floor height: 39.2 in (996 mm)
- Entry: Level with platform
- Doors: 8 (4 per side)
- Articulated sections: 2 (one articulation)
- Wheel diameter: 28.0 in (711 mm)
- Wheelbase: 7 ft 1 in (2.15 m)
- Maximum speed: 65 mph (104 km/h)
- Weight: 99,000 lb (45 t)
- Traction system: Toyo Denki RG6022-A-M 2-level IGBT–VVVF
- Traction motors: 4 × Toyo Denki TDK6483-A 194 hp (145 kW) asynchronous 3-phase AC
- Power output: 780 hp (580 kW)
- Transmission: 6.43 : 1 gear ratio (2-stage reduction)
- Acceleration: 3 mph/s (1.3 m/s^{2})
- Deceleration: 3.5 mph/s (1.6 m/s^{2})
- Electric systems: Overhead line, 750 V DC
- Current collection: TransTech pantograph
- UIC classification: Bo′(2)′Bo′
- AAR wheel arrangement: B-2-B
- Bogies: KD242 (powered), KD243 (center)
- Minimum turning radius: 82 ft (25 m)
- Braking system: Pneumatic
- Safety systems: ATC, ATP, Emergency brakes, ATO
- Coupling system: Tomlinson/Dellner
- Multiple working: Yes
- Headlight type: LED
- Track gauge: 4 ft 8 1/2 in (1,435 mm) standard gauge

The P3010 is an articulated light rail car used on the Los Angeles Metro Rail system manufactured by Kinki Sharyo, operated on all of the Metro Rail light rail lines.

Ordered by Metro in 2012, the first train entered service in 2016. A total of 235 trains were built, making it Metro's largest rail fleet.

== History ==
AnsaldoBreda delivered 50 P2550 Light Rail Vehicles (LRV) to Metro between 2006 and 2011 for use on the newly expanded Gold Line. Delivery of the vehicles was approximately three years behind schedule, and Metro claimed they were overweight; thus, the agency chose not to exercise their option to purchase more beyond this initially contracted order.

However, with multiple light rail lines under construction or in planning and the P865 trains approaching their end of life, Metro anticipated a substantial need for LRVs and thus requested bids for a new contract, for vehicles which were dubbed the P3010 series. The base P3010 contract order was for 78 cars: 63 cars for the Expo and Blue lines, and 15 cars for the Gold Line Foothill Extension. (Phase 1 of the Expo Line used P865 cars from the existing fleet.) Metro completed a contract on April 30, 2012, with delivery of the first LRV projected for 30 months later, in 2014. The contract included options for an additional 157 cars.

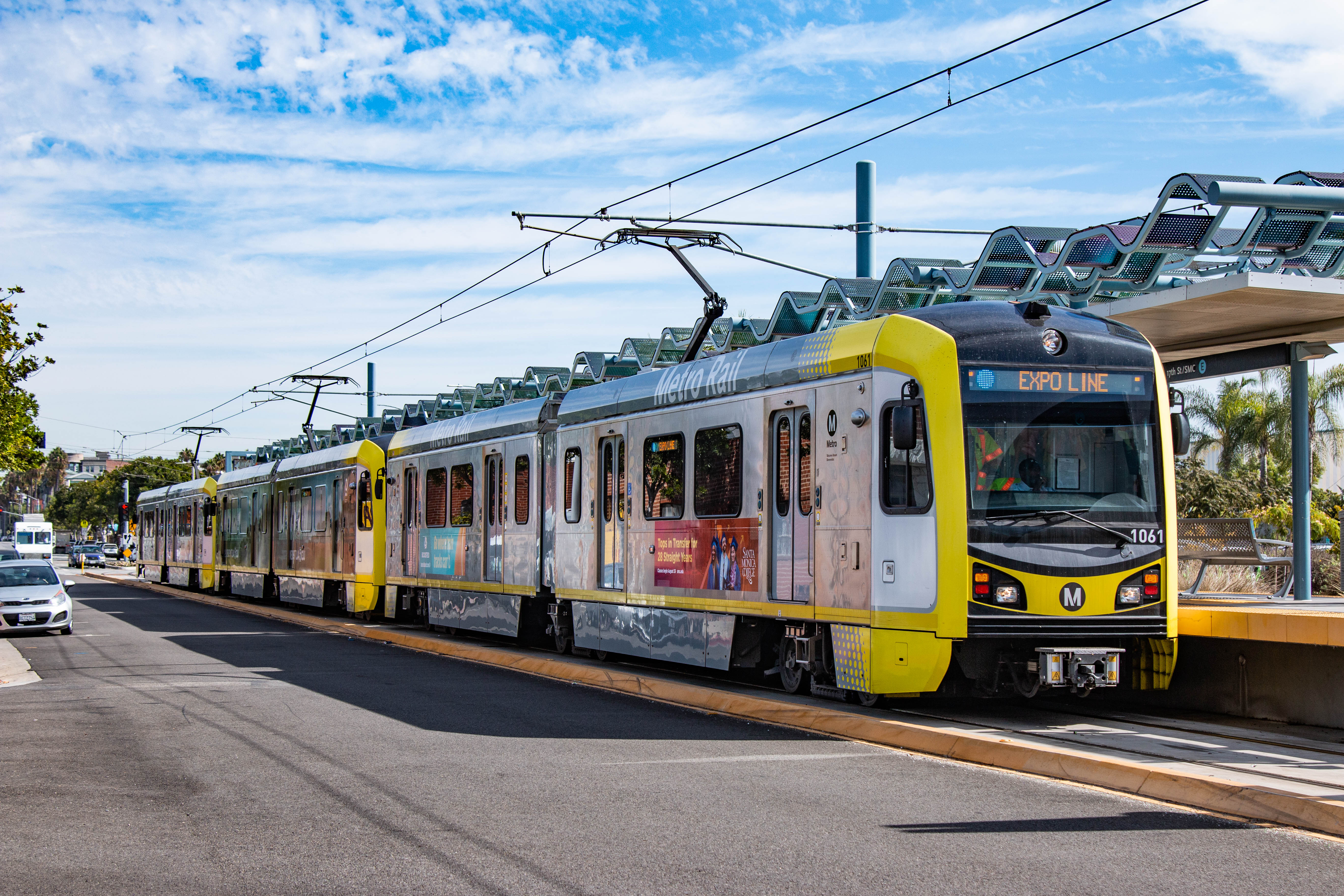
Kinki Sharyo P3010 LRVs as a trainset at 17th Street/SMC station

=== Contract award ===
Metro awarded the contract for the first 78 cars to Kinki Sharyo for $299 million. The remaining cars were split into four options with 28, 39, 21 and 69, respectively. If all the options were exercised, the number of LRVs would total 235, valued at a total $890 million.

On July 25, 2013, Metro exercised two options (69 + 28) totaling 97 additional cars for $396.7 million. This brought the total of ordered cars to 175. As part of the option, Kinki Sharyo, the El Segundo-based U.S. arm of Kinki Sharyo Co. Ltd. of Osaka, announced in December 2014 that they would retrofit an existing space in Palmdale to build the vehicles. Final assembly work was being performed in hangar space the company leased in Palmdale from Los Angeles World Airports. The first car was delivered to Metro in October 2014 for testing before series production begins.

=== Entry into service ===
The cars began entering service in early 2016, though many were still in the testing stage when the Expo Line and Gold Line extensions opened that year, resulting in longer-than-expected headways and some crush loads. By October 2016, four LRVs were being delivered per month. In June 2017, P3010s began to be rolled out on the Blue Line, allowing Metro to begin phasing out the P865s. At the end of 2017, some of the P3010s from the Blue Line were routed for Green Line service using the Willowbrook spur and pocket track to transfer between the two lines.

In January 2021, the final train of the contract was delivered by Kinki Sharyo, with the $1.02 billion project completed on time and on budget.

== See also ==
- Los Angeles Metro Rail rolling stock
- Siemens P2000
- AnsaldoBreda P2550
