= Los Angeles Metro Rail rolling stock =

List of LACMTA Metro Rail rolling stock

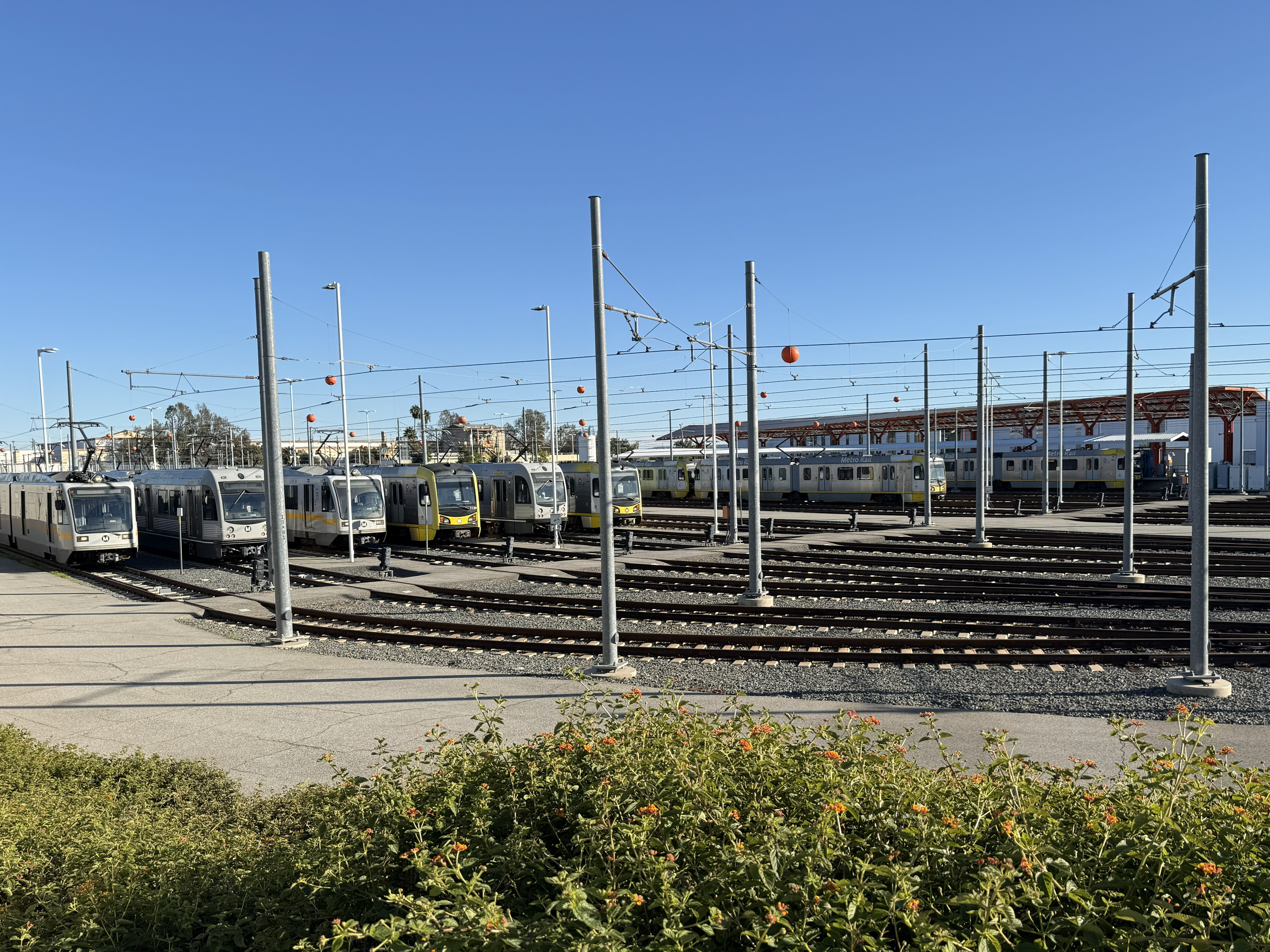
Siemens P2000, AnsaldoBreda P2550, and Kinki Sharyo P3010 light rail vehicles at Division 24 in 2025

Los Angeles Metro operates six rail lines as part of its Metro Rail system. This system includes four light rail lines and two rapid transit lines. The agency owns, operates, and maintains a fleet of 437 rail vehicles.

== Rail vehicles ==
=== Current fleet ===
Metro operates two main types of rail vehicles: light rail and rapid transit. Metro's light rail vehicles, used on the A, C, E, and K lines, are 87-foot (26.52 m) articulated double-ended vehicles, powered by overhead lines, which typically run in two or three vehicle consists. Metro's rapid transit vehicles, used on the B and D lines, are 75-foot (22.86 m) electric multiple unit, married-pair cars, powered by electrified third rail, that typically run in four or six-car consists.

Manufacturer	Model	Image	Built	In service	Qty.	Fleet numbers	Line	Division	Notes
Light rail fleet
Siemens	P2000		1996–1999	2001–present	52 (Note: Will be replaced by the P3030 series by 2031)	201–250, 301–302	A Line C Line K Line	11, 16, 22, 24 (Note: The P2000s can be stored at any of the light rail divisions at any given time.)	Fleet has been refurbished by Alstom since 2019
AnsaldoBreda	P2550		2005–2011	2008–present	50	701–750	A Line E Line	11, 14, 21, 24	Fleet being refurbished by Kinki Sharyo since 2023
Kinki Sharyo	P3010		2014–2020	2016–present	235	1001–1235	A Line C Line E Line K Line	11, 14, 16, 21, 22, 24	
Subway fleet
Breda	A650		1988–1993	1993–present	30 (Note: Will be replaced by the HR4000 series from 2024 onward.)	501–530	B Line D Line	20	DC motors; 14 may be converted into unpowered trailers ("belly cars"), the rest to be retired
Breda	A650		1995–1997	1996–present	74 (Note: Will be replaced by the HR5000 series by 2030.)	531–604	B Line D Line	20	AC motors; Talgo contracted to refurbish entire fleet in 2016, contract was cancelled for poor performance after 10 cars partially refurbished. Four cars left significantly disassembled.; Woojin Industrial Systems contracted to refurbish entire fleet in 2024.
CRRC	HR4000		2021–present	2024–present	64	4001–4064	B Line D Line	20	After construction delays and issues relating to the Uyghur Forced Labor Prevention Act of 2021, Metro chose not to continue its contract with CRRC for option cars.

=== Future fleet ===
Manufacturer	Model	Quantity Purchased	Notes
Light rail fleet
TBD	P3030	33 (142 options)	33 for East San Fernando Valley Light Rail Transit Project; Option for 52 to replace the Siemens P2000; Option for 90 for Southeast Gateway Line and extensions of A and E lines
Subway fleet
Hyundai Rotem	HR5000	182 (50 options)	74 to replace the second batch of A650; 108 for D Line extension phase 2 & 3; Option for 50 to support future subway lines

=== Retired fleet ===
Manufacturer	Model	Picture	Year built	Years in service	Quantity	Fleet numbers	Notes
Light rail fleet
Nippon Sharyo	P865		1989–1990	1990–2018	54	100–153	All were named after cities in Los Angeles County.; 100, named Long Beach, repainted in its original LACTC paint scheme following retirement, to be put on static display in Long Beach.; 108 modified for chemical defence training at Fort Leonard Wood.; 144, named South Gate, preserved at the Southern California Railway Museum in Perris, California.
Nippon Sharyo	P2020		1994–1995	1995–2021	15	154–168	Equipped with automated controls for Green Line service, but never used.; 164 preserved at the Western Railway Museum in Suisun City, California

== Rail facilities ==
=== Current rail facilities ===
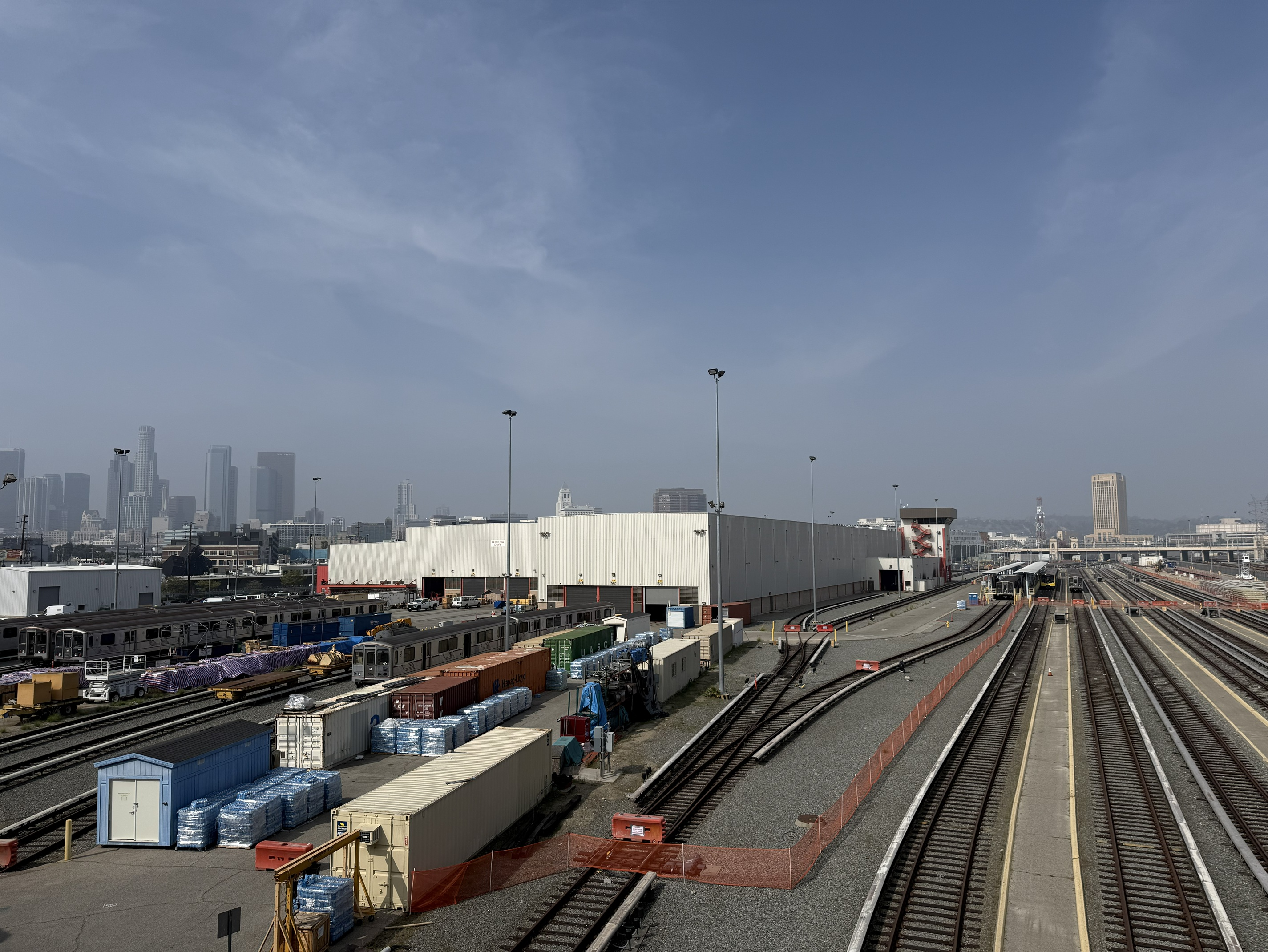
Breda A650 and CRRC HR4000 subway trains at Division 20 in 2025

Metro refers to its rail and bus operations facilities as "divisions." Rail vehicles are maintained at several divisions across Los Angeles County:

Division	Line	Location
11	A Line	Long Beach, between Del Amo and Wardlow stations
14	E Line	Santa Monica, east of 26th Street/Bergamot station
16	C Line K Line	Westchester, adjacent to the LAX/Metro Transit Center
20	B Line D Line	Arts District, south of Union Station
21	E Line	Elysian Park, between Chinatown and Lincoln/Cypress stations
22	K Line	Hawthorne, northwest of Redondo Beach station
24	A Line	Monrovia, east of Monrovia station

=== Planned rail facilities ===
Metro plans to build three new rail facilities over the next few years.

- A new facility will be built in the San Fernando Valley, west of Van Nuys Boulevard and south of the Metrolink tracks, as part of the planned East San Fernando Valley Light Rail Transit Project.
- A new facility is being studied for either Bellflower or Paramount to support operations on the Southeast Gateway Line.
- A new facility will be built in Montebello, bound by Flotilla Street to the north, Yates Avenue to the west, South Vail Avenue to the east, and Washington Boulevard to the south to serve the Eastside Transit Corridor Phase 2 project, which extends the E Line to the intersection between Washington Boulevard and South Greenwood Avenue.

A fourth facility, serving the Sepulveda Transit Corridor, is also planned; its exact location is still being determined.

== See also ==
- Los Angeles Metro bus fleet
- Los Angeles Metro Rail
- Los Angeles Metro
