= Dean T. Kashiwagi =

American economist (1952–2025)

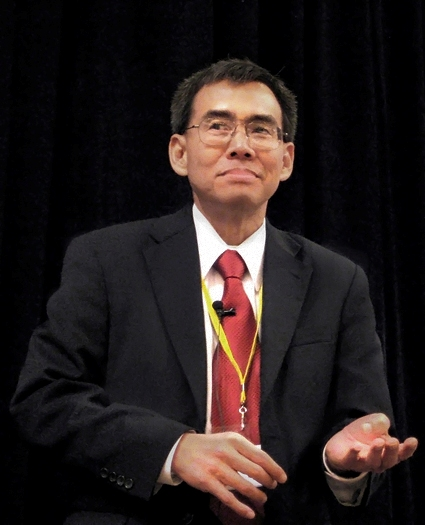
- Kashiwagi speaking in 2009
- Born: Dean Takeo Kashiwagi; October 27, 1952; Oahu, Hawaii Territory, U.S.
- Died: April 1, 2025 (aged 72); Mesa, Arizona, U.S.
- Education: Industrial Engineering
- Alma mater: University of Hawaii, Arizona State University (Ph.D.)
- Occupation: Professor
- Employer(s): Arizona State University, United States Air Force
- Organization: Performance Based Studies Research Group (PBSRG)
- Known for: Best value procurement
- Notable work: Information Measurement Theory (IMT) and Best Value Approach (BVA)
- Children: 8
- Parent(s): Shizuo and Midori Kashiwagi
- Awards: 2012 Fellow, International Facility Management Association

Dean Takeo Kashiwagi (October 27, 1952 – April 1, 2025) was an American economist, professor at Arizona State University and a specialist in best value procurement, the originator of a system called "PIPS." The system is widely used internationally in construction projects to mitigate risks and increase transparency. The PIPS system was later applied to other fields, namely leadership training and education. While a professor at Arizona State University, Kashiwagi performed more than 900 tests of the PIPS model, covering $4.6 billion in procurement costs.

== Life and career ==
Kashiwagi was born on October 27, 1952, to Shizuo and Midori Kashiwagi. His father, Shizuo, was a second-generation Japanese-American who graduated from the University of Hawaiʻi with a Bachelor of Science in Civil Engineering and became a civil and structural engineer for the city and county of Honolulu. His mother was an entrepreneur with a Bachelor of Science degree from the University of Hawaiʻi. Dean was the youngest of three children.

Kashiwagi received an undergraduate degree in civil engineering from the University of Hawaiʻi. He then pursued studies in industrial engineering at Arizona State University where he earned a master's degree in 1983 and a PhD in 1991.

Kashiwagi served in the United States Air Force for 14 years after serving a church mission in Japan and attending college. While in college, Kashiwagi was a member of ROTC. After he received his undergraduate degree, Kashiwagi moved to Holloman Air Force Base in New Mexico where he became the JOC president. During this time, Kashiwagi was sent to Arizona State University to acquire his PhD. In 1992, Kashiwagi retired from the air force and began teaching at Arizona State University.

Kashiwagi died April 1, 2025, at the age of 72.

== Academic work ==
Kashiwagi developed the ideas of Information Measurement Theory and the Kashiwagi Solution Model; applying his theories to businesses, he developed a modified theory he would call the Performance Information Procurement System "PIPS". With this model, Kashiwagi started the Performance Based Research Group (PBSRG) at Arizona State University. While a professor at Arizona State, Kashiwagi tested the PIPS model rigorously. PBSRG would work with private partners to help them implement PIPS and choose providers for their construction projects. These procurement evaluations would become the cornerstone of Dr. Kashiwagi's research.

At Arizona State, Kashiwagi received over $18 million in research funding for the Del E. Webb School of Construction. He evaluated the PIPS process over 900 times in six different countries and 30 U.S. states, finding a 98% success rate of the model. During his time as a professor, the PIPS model was used to evaluate $4.6 billion in construction procurement costs.

The Best Value Procurement model has been exported internationally, where it is widely used in construction projects. The Best Value Procurement model has been applied to other types of procurement processes, including food services, janitorial services, radio equipment and card purchases. From 2004 to 2007, the PIPS process was used by the Army Medical Command for a number of renovation projects. In 2005, Harvard was awarded a CoreNet Global Innovation of the Year Award for their implementation of Kashiwagi's PIPS system for managing their capital projects and controlling risk. The model is used widely in public service projects, including procurement provision for the states of Oklahoma and Wyoming.

In 2008, Kashiwagi was awarded a Fulbright Scholar grant to lecture and research at the University of Botswana. There, he would help the University of Botswana create an interdisciplinary project management graduate program.

In 2012, Kashiwagi was named a fellow of the International Facility Management Association, an honor bestowed on less than .5% of the organization's membership.

In 2013, Kashiwagi's research was applied to develop a leadership course at ASU's Barrett Honors College. The course was later adapted to create a leadership training program for middle and high school students and a success coaching program.

== Awards ==
- 2015 AzTE Inventor Recognition
- 2012 Fellow, International Facility Management Association
- 2011 Silver Award for Procurement Excellence by the National Association of State Procurement Officials
- 2009 International Facility Management Association Educator of the Year
- 2008 Fulbright Scholarship, Botswana
- 2005 CoreNet Global Innovation of the Year Award
- 2001 Pono Technology Award

== Publications ==
- Best Value Procurement, 2004. ISBN 978-1889857268
- How to Know Everything Without Knowing Everything, 2019. ASIN B07XVSP5J7
