= Best value procurement =

Procurement method that looks at many factors

Best value procurement (BVP) is a procurement method that looks at factors other than only price, such as quality and expertise, when selecting vendors or contractors.

In a best value system, the value of procured goods or services can be simply described as a comparison of costs and benefits. A contractor or vendor is thus selected through a process of researching the vendors or contractors before a detailed project plan is made.

Although BVP is a new procurement method, it does build on procuring and tendering according to the MEAT principle (most economically advantageous tender). The principle enables the contracting authority to take account of criteria that reflect qualitative, technical and sustainable aspects of the tender submission as well as price when reaching an award decision.

The BVP approach is based on the conviction that minimizing risks or eliminating risks when allocated information is effectively used for a proper choice. This means the more information that is available and the better it is utilized, the better the future can be predicted and the fewer decisions or risks have to be made.

BVP is based upon natural law. Rather than changing and manipulating people, one can understand the nature of transactions which then can be anticipated on using expertise to a maximum, with minimum risks and maximum value as a result.

Typically values are assigned to factors such as price, past performance, schedule, and vision.

These values are tabulated for each potential vendor or contractor and one will come out on top.

== Benefits of BVP ==
This system is claimed to be beneficial because it needs less decision-making, prepares for the future, and minimizes risk. Even if risks occur, they can be effectively controlled or managed.

One of the most important aspects of best value procurement is looking at past performance. It has a vision and method for procuring and tendering in which the main focus is not price, but the performance of market parties.

If a client is looking to build a five million dollar building, it is important to see if potential vendors have completed projects on such a scale. This will prevent clients from selecting vendors based on a low bid.

Best value procurement is allowed for US federal government projects under the Federal Acquisition Regulation and 10 USC § 2304.

== Uses of BVP Around the World ==
The BVP system was developed in the United States. This system has been practiced in many projects in the US as well as in other countries, such as the United Kingdom and the Netherlands.

In the Netherlands, BVP is known as "prestatie inkoop," which translates as "performance procurement."

== Choosing factors for BVP ==
The process of choosing the factors to guide procurement toward best value has three stages: identifying the possibilities, choosing relevant factors, and assigning values, or "weights".

== See also ==
- Dean Kashiwagi, originator of the PIPs model of best quality procurement
