= Siemens P2000 =

Articulated light rail vehicle

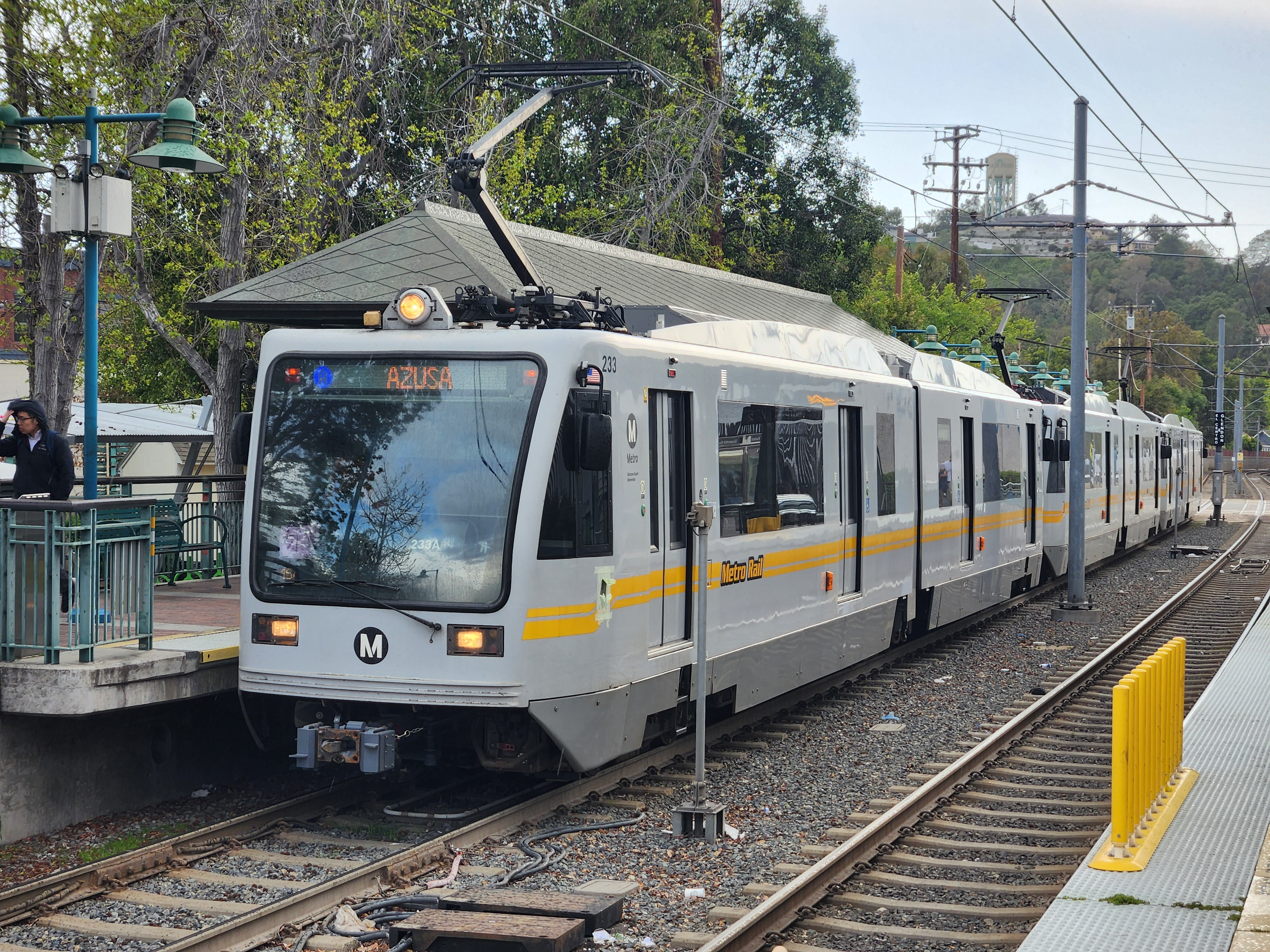

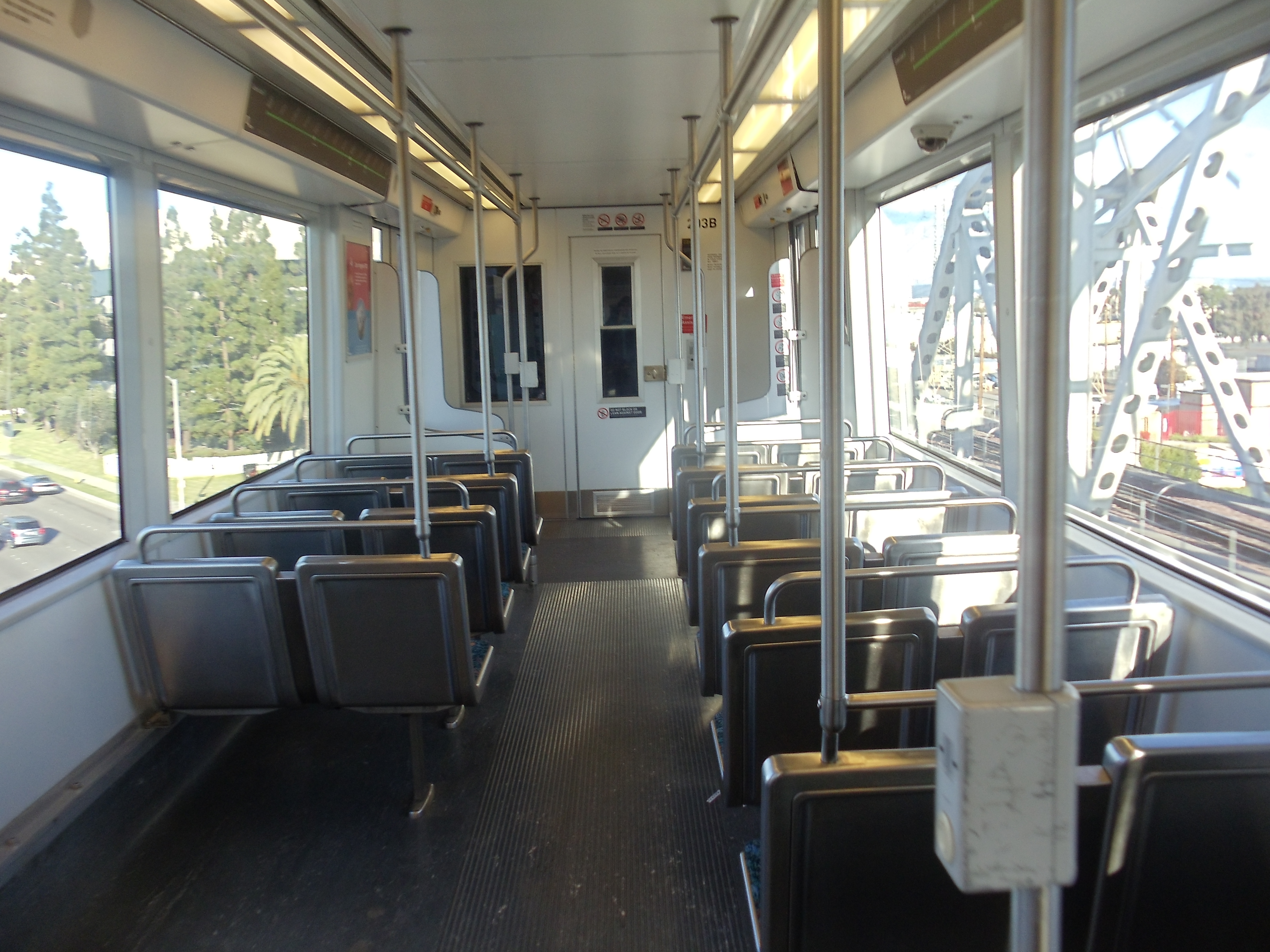
- In service: 2000–present
- Manufacturer: Siemens Mobility
- Constructed: 1996–1999
- Entered service: 2000–2003
- Refurbished: Alstom; 2019—2024
- Number built: 52
- Formation: Single unit
- Fleet numbers: 201–250, 301–302
- Capacity: 100 (76 seats)
- Depots: Division 11 (Long Beach); Division 16 (Westchester); Division 22 (Hawthorne); Division 24 (Monrovia)
- Line served: A Line C Line K Line

Specifications
- Car body construction: LAHT
- Train length: 268 ft 8 in (81.9 m) (three cars)
- Car length: 89 ft 7 in (27.3 m)
- Width: 8 ft 8 in (2.65 m)
- Height: 12 ft 4 in (3.76 m) (without pantograph)
- Floor height: 3 ft 2.4 in (975 mm)
- Doors: 8 (4 per side)
- Articulated sections: 2 (one articulation)
- Wheelbase: 6 ft 11 in (2.1 m)
- Maximum speed: 70 mph (110 km/h)
- Weight: 98,000 lb (44 t)
- Traction system: AEG/Westinghouse GTO–VVVF (as built); Alstom OPTONIX IGBT–VVVF (after repowering)
- Traction motors: 4 × 185 hp (138 kW)
- Power output: 740 hp (552 kW)
- Acceleration: 3 mph/s (4.4 ft/s^{2}; 1.3 m/s^{2})
- Deceleration: 3.5 mph/s (5.1 ft/s^{2}; 1.6 m/s^{2})
- Electric systems: 750 V DC overhead catenary
- Current collection: Brecknell Willis & Faiveley pantographs
- UIC classification: Bo′(2)′Bo′
- AAR wheel arrangement: B-2-B
- Safety systems: ATC, Emergency brakes, ATP, ATO
- Coupling system: Tomlinson
- Track gauge: 4 ft 8 1/2 in (1,435 mm) standard gauge

The P2000 is an articulated light rail vehicle used on the Los Angeles Metro Rail system, manufactured by Siemens Mobility. The P2000 trains were ordered to supplement the fleet of the C Line, then known as the Green Line. P2000 trains originally serviced the Gold Line, but were later transferred to the Blue Line (now A Line) in 2012. As of late 2026, P2000 trains are scheduled to remain in service until their planned retirement by 2031.

P2000 trains continue to operate on the A Line, but are currently being transferred to the C and K Lines as of late 2026. They were expected to operate for an additional 15 years following an overhaul program that began in 2020. However, new plans call for the complete replacement of the P2000 by 2031, spearheaded by the constant mechanical failures.

== Background ==
In July 1992, the Los Angeles County Transportation Commission issued a request for proposals for light rail vehicles for use on the then-under construction Green Line. Four bids were received – Bombardier Transportation, Morrison–Knudsen, Siemens-Duewag and Sumitomo/Nippon Sharyo. In June 1993, a contract was awarded to Siemens-Duewag to deliver 72 light rail vehicles at a cost of $2.7 million per vehicle. The contract was signed in February 1994.

== Construction ==
Siemens-Duewag opened a manufacturing facility in Carson, operated in partnership with AAI Corporation, to build the car shells. The car shells, the key structural components of the train, were the first to be manufactured in the United States for 50 years. Final assembly was performed in Sacramento.

Following cost cutting in 1995, 20 trains were cut from the contract. 52 trains were eventually built between 1996 and 1999.

== Service history ==
The first train was delivered to Metro in January 1998, and trains entered service on the Green Line in July 2000. Introduction into service was delayed slightly, drawing criticism from the news media that highlighted the P2000 contract's high cost and Metro's contemporary fiscal issues. The trains were subsequently used on the Green (C), Blue (A) and Expo (E) lines.

The P2000 was used on the Gold Line (L) between 2003 and 2012 and the A and E lines thereafter. It returned in revenue service on the L Line in 2023 shortly before the Regional Connector began revenue service and the L Line was discontinued. It had since been exclusive to the C Line, until its rocky return to the A Line in late 2024. Ever since its rocky return, P2000s were removed from the C Line altogether, though as of late 2026, they are slated to return.

In June 2013, Metro awarded a fixed price contract to PAMCO Machine Works in Monrovia, California, to overhaul the powered axle assemblies for the then thirteen year old P2000 trains.

The entire fleet was refurbished by Alstom, on Mare Island in Vallejo, California. The overhaul program includes major mechanical work, new graphics, and maintenance of control systems. Metro received the first refurbished P2000 train in October 2020, and expected to receive one train per month until all 52 trains were overhauled.

=== Retirement ===
In 2024, Metro began work to replace the P2000 trains, which are scheduled to be retired in the early 2030s.

== Technical specifications ==
The P2000 trains feature automatic train control, air conditioning, emergency intercoms, wheelchair spaces and emergency braking. Refurbished cars feature new door control systems, communication systems, and HVAC technology.

The P2000 trains are capable of multiple-unit operation with some other light rail vehicles in service on the Metro Rail system, including the P3010 and the now-retired Nippon Sharyo P865.

P2000 light rail vehicles are equipped with automatic train operation technology. This technology was intended to be used on the Green Line (later the C Line), enabled by the line's lack of grade crossings. Despite this capability, the trains are manually operated.

== See also ==
- Los Angeles Metro Rail rolling stock
