= Faiveley Transport =

French manufacturing company for the railway industry

Faiveley Transport S.A.
- Faiveley Transport logo

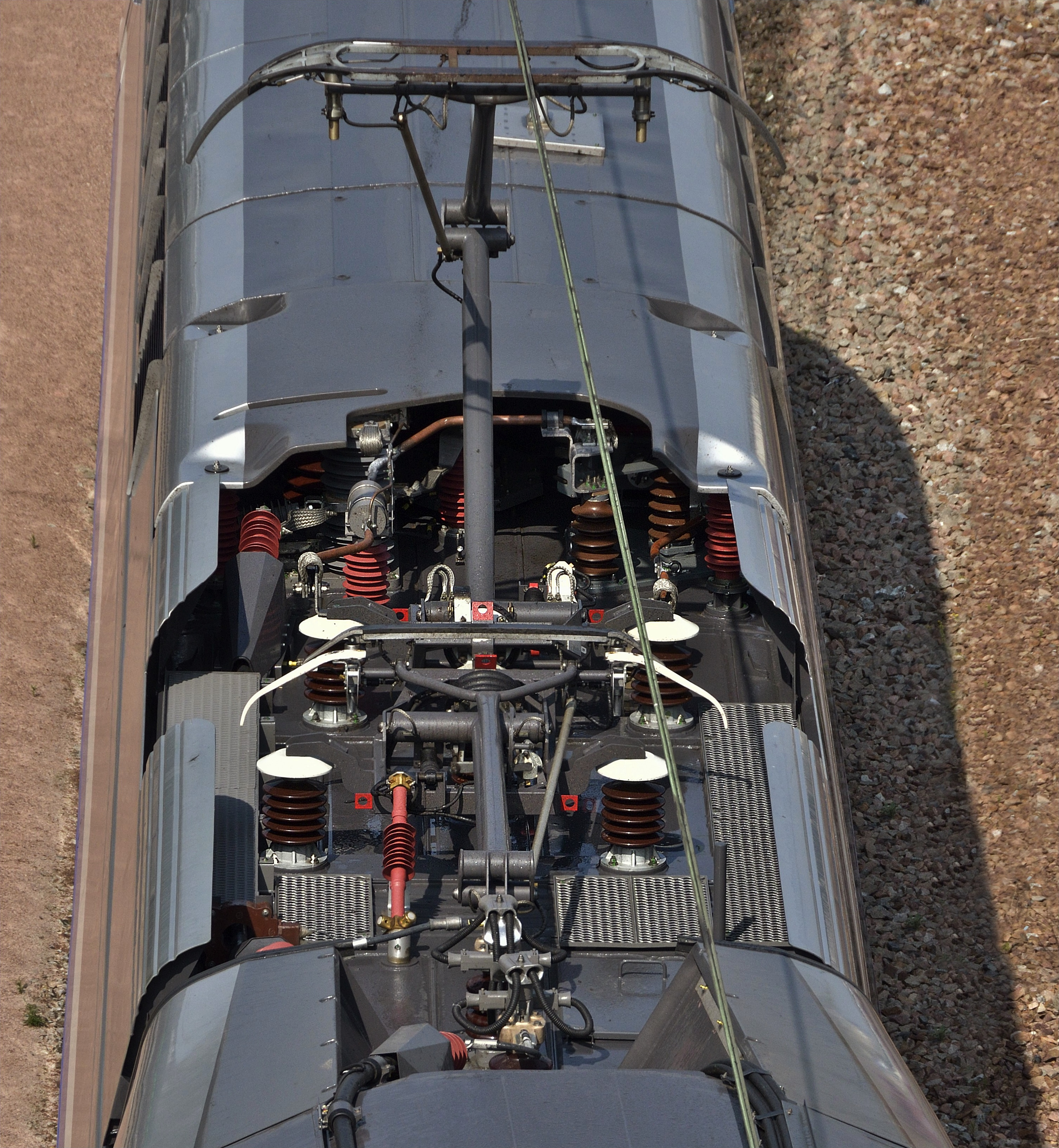
- Type: Société anonyme
- Industry: Railway industry supplier
- Founded: 1919; 107 years ago
- Founder: Louis Faiveley
- Headquarters: Gennevilliers, France
- Area served: Worldwide
- Revenue: €900.52 million (2011) (Note: Between 31 March 2011 and 31 March 2012.)
- Operating income: €93.27 million (2011)
- Net income: €51.17 million (2011)
- Total assets: €1.47 billion (2011) (Note: As of 31 March 2012.)
- Total equity: €505.1 million (2011)
- Parent: Wabtec
- Website: FaiveleyTransport.com

Faiveley Transport (French pronunciation: [fɛvəlɛ tʁɑ̃spɔʁ]), formerly Faiveley, is an international manufacturer and supplier of equipment for the railway industry. Founded in 1919, it introduced the single-arm pantograph in 1955. The company has subsidiaries in more than 24 countries. The majority of Faiveley Transport's outstanding stock is owned by Wabtec, which acquired majority stock ownership from the Faiveley family in 2016.

== History ==
=== First years ===
In 1919, Louis Faiveley founded in Saint-Ouen, France, the Établissements Louis Faiveley, a small assembly shop centred on electromechanical parts. It soon grew and became one of the French railway system's leading suppliers. It introduced its first pantograph in 1923. In 1930, it also ventured into the manufacture of door systems for trains. By the 1930s, it was already one of France's leading companies in all its fields of activity. In 1935, the company became a Société Anonyme, although the shares' majority stayed in hands of the Faiveley family.

After the Second World War, the company quickly recovered and in 1946, it introduced electric heating systems. In 1955, it helped set a new high-speed train record, as a Faiveley-equipped train exceeded 331 km/h (206 mph). That year, the company also introduced the first single-arm pantograph; this innovation helped it to maintain its position as the world leader in railway pantograph systems.

=== Internationalisation ===
In 1961, the company created a research and development division with the aim of adapting electronic applications to the railway industry, included automatic door systems. It also began to equip the new rubber-wheeled Paris Metro cars. In 1965, the company started to produce automatic doors for buildings, creating in 1968 a subsidiary specifically for this area: Faiveley Automatismes.

The company continued its expansion. It opened subsidiaries in Spain and Brazil (Equipfer) in 1966 and 1976, respectively. In 1979, an Italian branch was created. Although initial attempts to enter into the American and Canadian markets were not as successful, by the late 1990s it had expanded into those countries.

The Stone-Faiveley AMBR pantograph is one of the four standard pantographs in use on the British railway network, fitted to many locomotives and multiple units between the late 1950s and mid-1980s; it has a maximum operating speed of 160 km/h (99 mph). It is generally associated with older rolling stock.

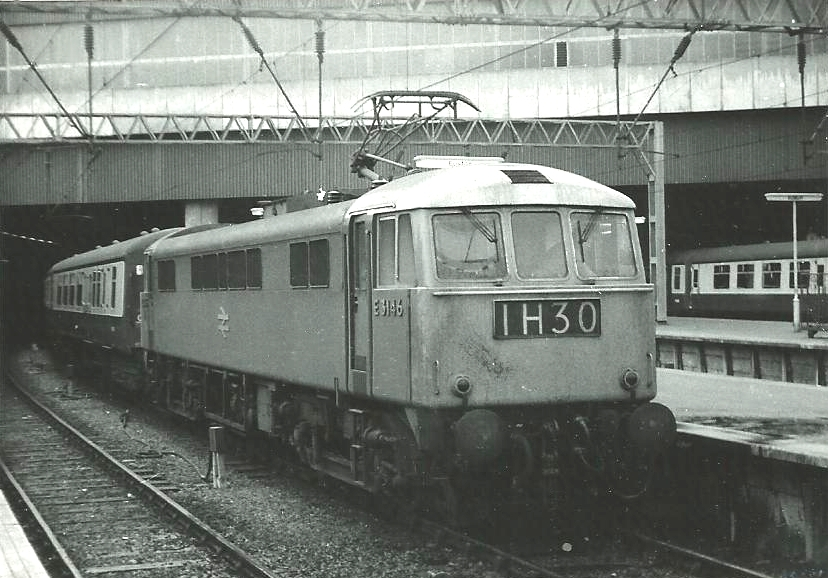
A Stone Faiveley pantograph in raised position on Class 86 25 kV AC Bo-Bo locomotive no. E3146 (later 86017), at London Euston, England (April 1969)

France remained as Faiveley's core market. During the 1970s, the company introduced new corail coaches for the SNCF and provided equipment for a new generation of subway trains, the MF77. In 1972, Faiveley presented its first very high speed pantograph. Soon after, it introduced its first electric automated road system.

In 1984, Faiveley purchased Saint-Gobain subsidiary Air-Industrie's transport division, giving it operations in passenger train air conditioning systems. That year, it acquired from the Matra's subsidiary Interlec its tachometry activities. Together with the company's other transport-related activities, these subsidiary operations were gathered into a newly created subsidiary: Faiveley Transport.

The company was one of the suppliers of the new SNCF's TGV trains. In 1990, its pantographs were key to achieve a new 513.3 km/h (318.9 mph) record by TGV Atlantique.

In 1991, the company moved its headquarters to Saint-Pierre-des-Corps.

=== Diversification ===
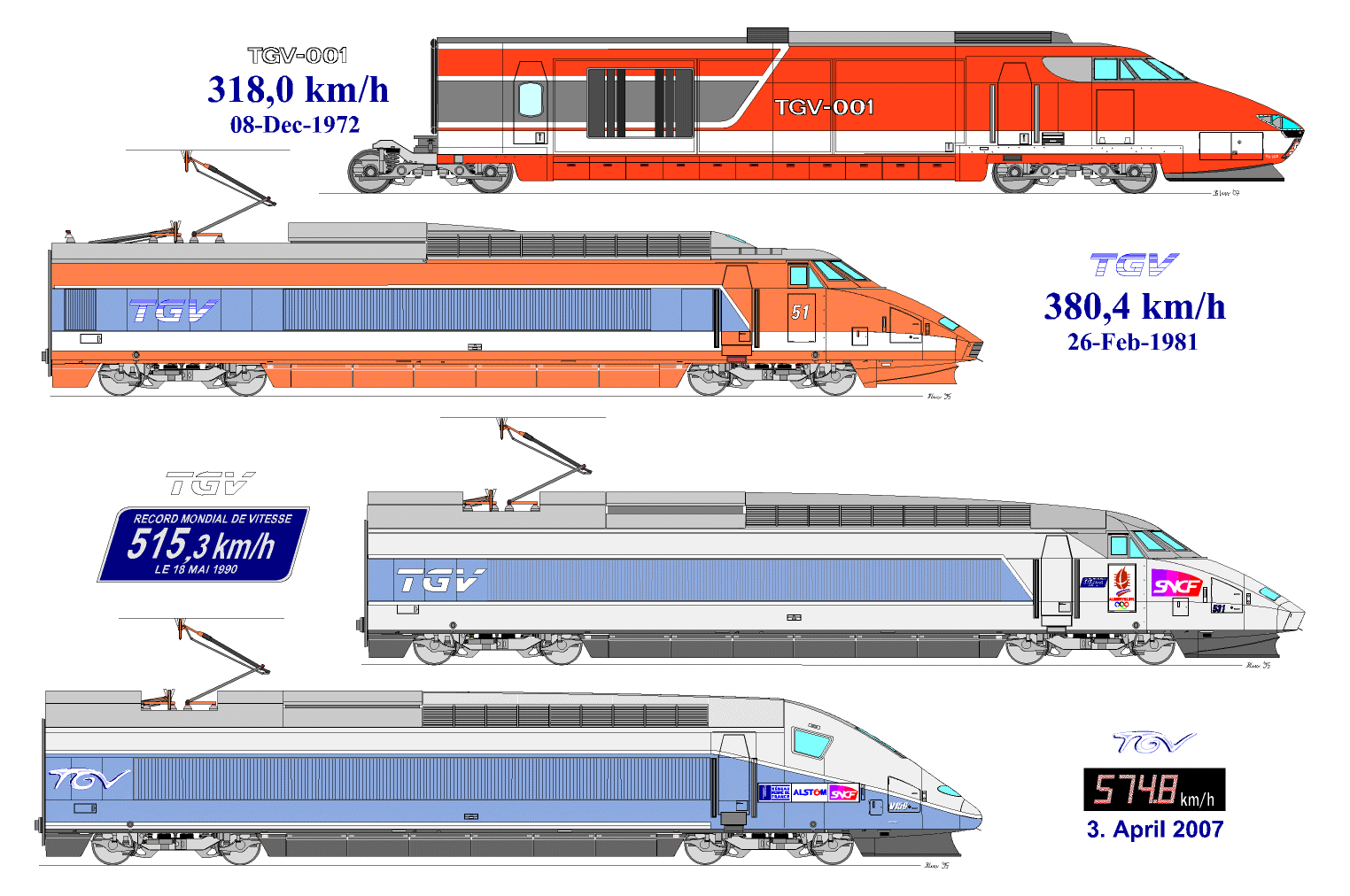
Faiveley supplied the pantographs of the 1981, 1990 and 2007 TGV's record trains.

With competition becoming more intense in its field of activity, Faiveley decided it was time to expand their operations.

In 1992, the company acquired plastics product maker Grand-Perret. In 1993, Faiveley moved to concentrate its activities around its historic core of railway and transport equipment, and its brand new plastics division, selling its Faiveley Automatismes subsidiary. It also made an aggressive move to increase its business in the Japanese market, one of the most important at the time, forming a joint venture with Nabco called Nabco-Faiveley Ltd, which became one of leading providers of Japan's railway. Later, Faiveley partnered also with Mitsui. That year Faiveley created a British subsidiary, to take a part of the business in the recently privatised rail system.

In 1994, Faiveley was listed on the Paris Bourse. In 1995, it acquired VPI-Verchère Plastiques Industriels, a thermo-injected plastic company. The following year, Faiveley added the operations of Rhône Moulage and Sepal Ltd, two companies also centred in plastics. By the end of the decade, that material had risen to nearly 20% of Faiveley's total sales.

In 1995, Faiveley purchased the German railway air conditioning company Hagenuk Fahrzeugklima from its parent company, Siemens. The purchase was a key step into the German market, as well as the Asian through its Chinese subsidiary Shanghai Hagenuk Refrigerating Machine, but also brought losses to the company during the following years. This led to a reorganisation that included staff reductions in Germany and France, and changes in the board of directors.

In December 2002, Faiveley purchased a 75% stake in the Czech pantograph and electro-mechanical equipment supplier Lekov. In 2004, it acquired the train brakes manufacturer Sab Wabco and the air conditioning manufacturer Neu Systèmes. In early 2007, it purchased the electronic systems and rolling stock manufacturer ESPAS group. Faiveley CX pantographs were fitted in the V150 TGV's record-breaking attempt of 2007, which set a new world railway speed record of 574.8 km/h (357.2 mph).

In April 2008, the company acquired from Carbone Lorraine its sintered brake material manufacturing and design department. In July of that year, it purchased the American freight wagon components' manufacturer Ellcon-National.

In September 2009, Faiveley SA and its subsidiary Faiveley Transport merged into a sole company, called Faiveley Transport SA.

In March 2011, the company purchased an 80% stake in the rolling stock heating, ventilation and air conditioning equipment manufacturer Urs Dolder AG and the remaining stake of Lekov.

On 3 February 2012, Faiveley Transport completed the purchase of Graham-White, an American designer and manufacturer of compressed air drying and brake systems for rail transport.

In February 2013, the company won a trial against Wabtec for the acts of unfair competition and secrets violation.

On 30 November 2016, the 51% stake of the company controlled by the Faiveley family was purchased by Wabtec, giving Wabtec controlling interest in Faiveley Transport.

== Current activities ==
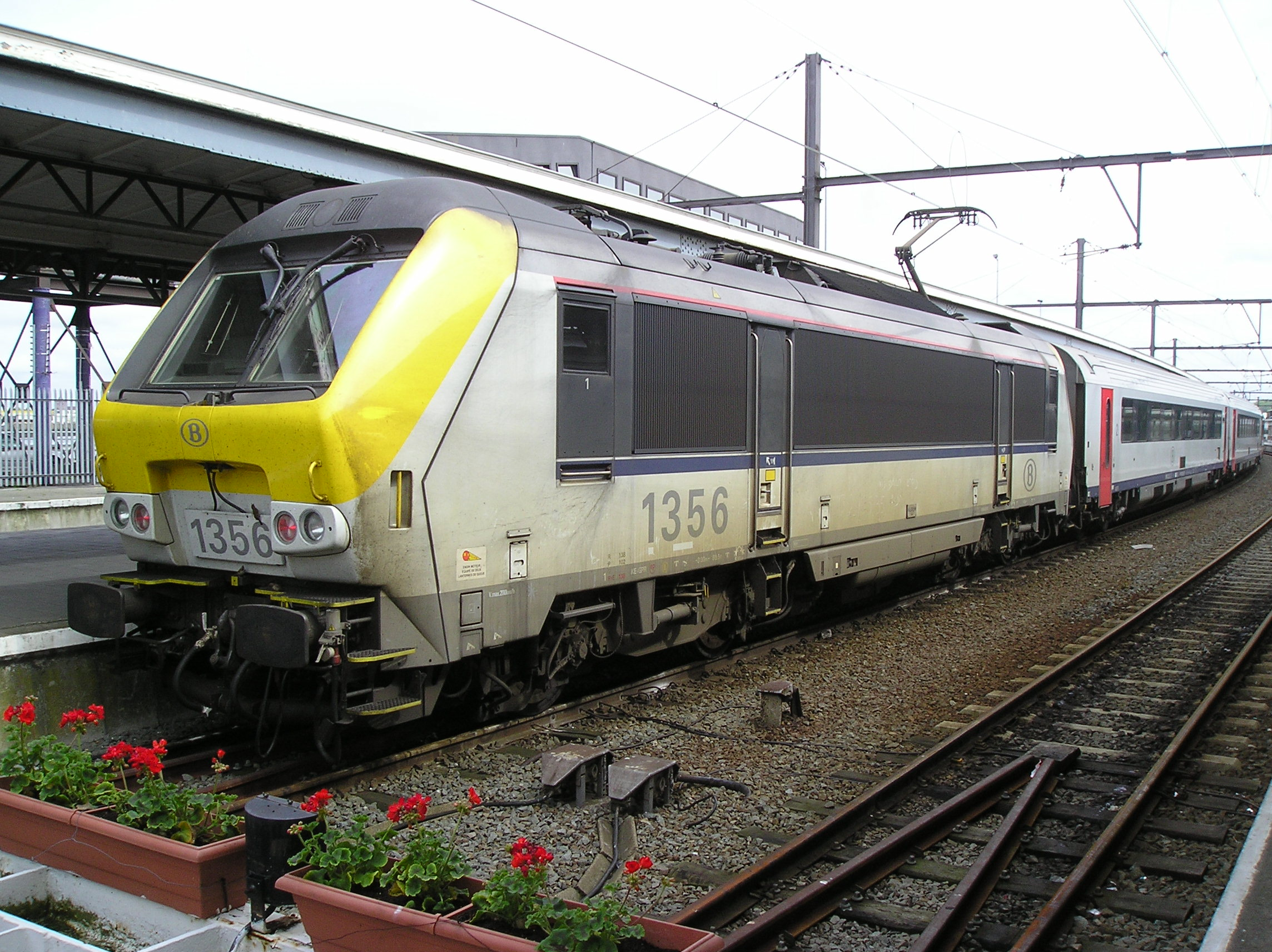
The pantographs of the SNCB Class 13 were manufactured by Faiveley.

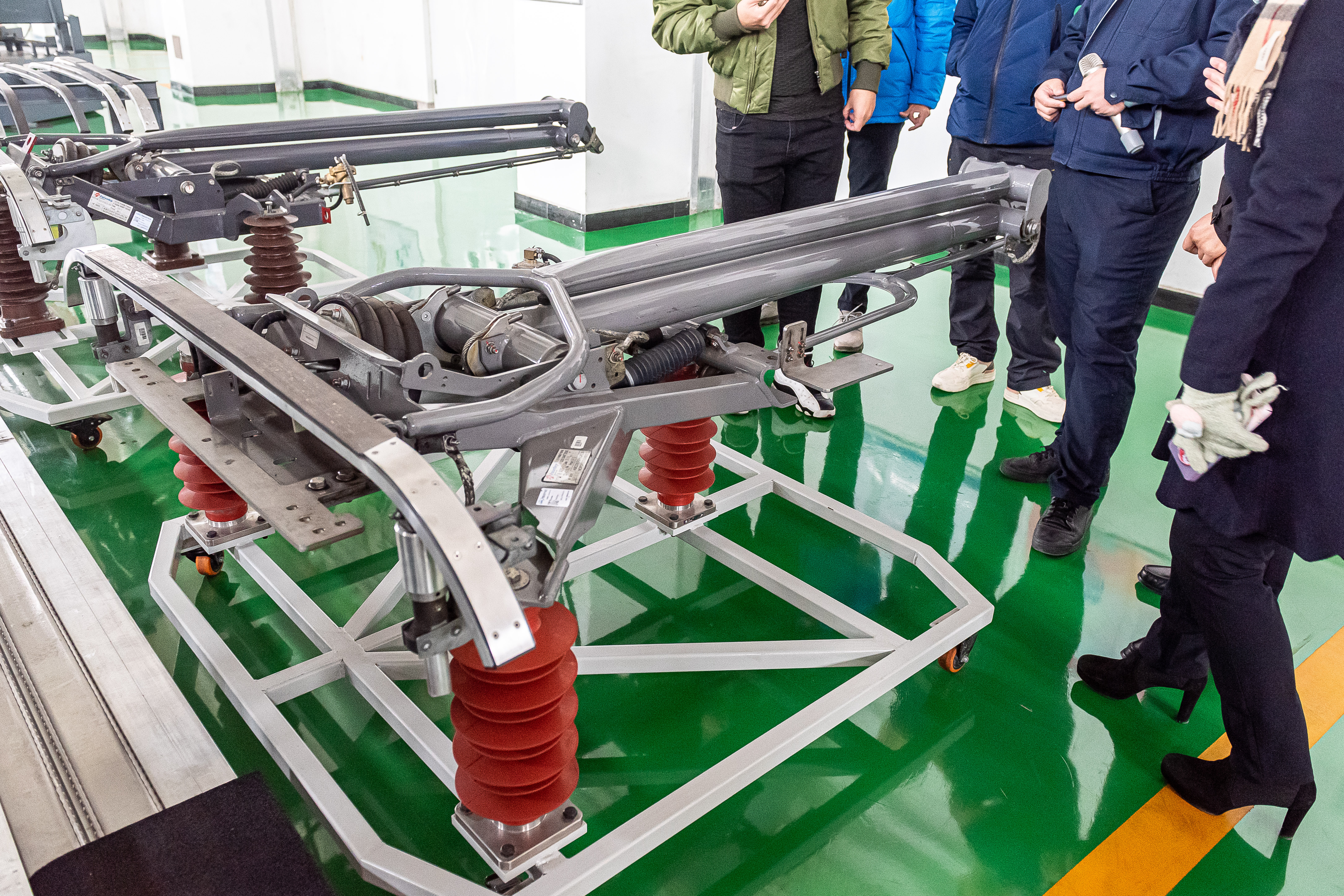
Faiveley CX-GI series pantograph designed for China Railway's Fuxing trains

Faiveley Transport offers a wide range of products related to the train equipment, such as cabin heating, ventilation and air conditioning (HVAC); HVAC system room, air distribution ducts, exhaust, urs dolder heaters; pantographs and high voltage switches, energy meters, auxiliary power converters, master controllers and driver awareness systems.

The company also provides access and information systems, such as platform screen doors and automatic platform gates, portal platform, door systems, passenger information systems and CCTV vigilance. In addition, it provides checks and security products, including couplers, odometry/tachometry systems and event recorders, brake control units, oil-free air generator BURAN, Nowe sanding, axle mounted disc, magnetictrack brake, disc brakes controllers, air generation and air treatment, and pantograph compressor.

It also provides renovation, maintenance, installation and consultancy services, including torque and engineering maintenance and spare parts and logistics; it serves tram and metro systems, high speed locomotives, and regional market segments trains.

=== Acquisition by Wabtec ===
In December 2016, Wabtec acquired majority stock ownership of Faiveley Transport from the Faiveley family, who had owned about 51% of the outstanding shares, for €1.6 billion and 6.3 million shares of Wabtec's common stock. After tender offers for the remaining outstanding shares, Wabtec owned 98.53% of Faiveley stock, with 97.66% of the voting rights. Wabtec plans to complete the acquisition with a mandatory squeeze-out of the shares which were not tendered.
