= Budd Universal Transit Vehicle =

Subway car built by the Budd Company from 1983 to 1986

Universal Transit Vehicle
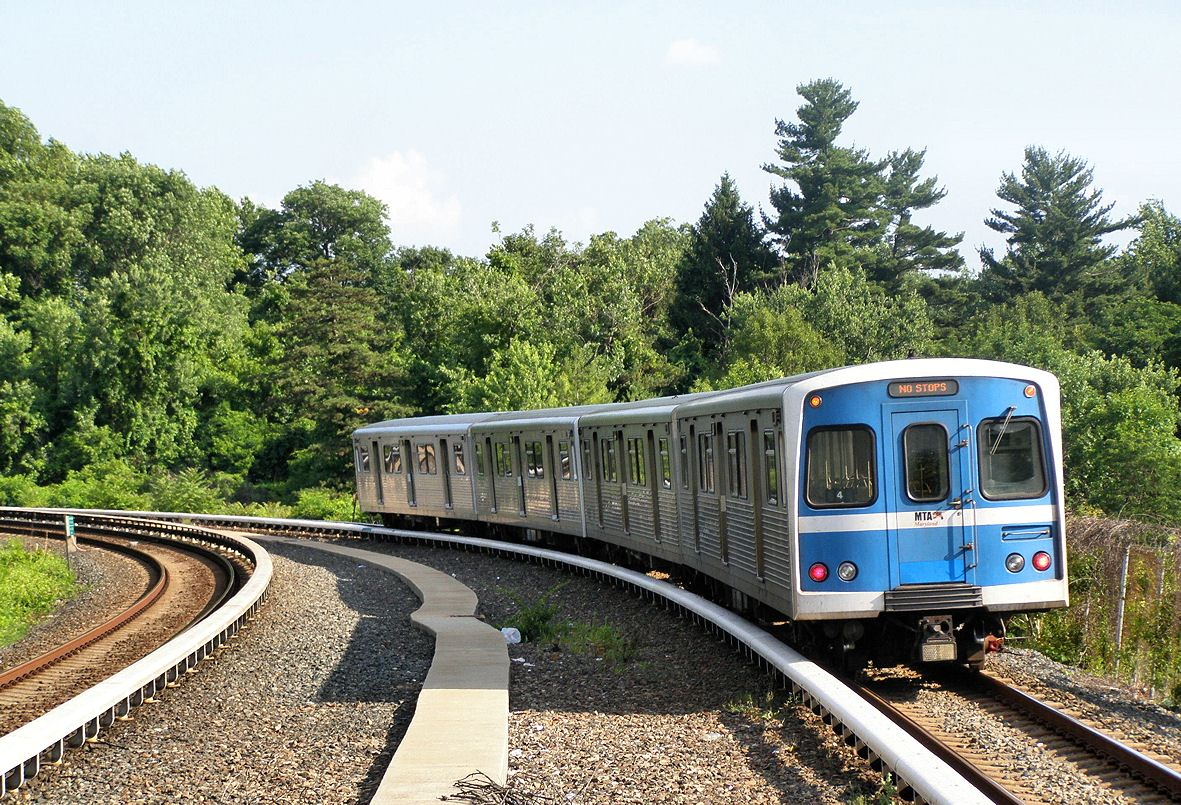
- Universal Transit Vehicle as seen on the Baltimore Metro SubwayLink
- In service: 1983–present (Metro SubwayLink); 1983–2020 (Metrorail)
- Manufacturer: Budd Company
- Constructed: 1982–1986
- Entered service: 1983–1987
- Scrapped: 2018–
- Number built: 236
- Formation: 2 cars per trainset (married pair)
- Capacity: 332 passengers per pair (166 per car) (664 passengers per 4-car train; 996 per 6-car train)
- Operators: Maryland Transit Administration (1983–present); Miami-Dade Transit (1983–2020)
- Lines served: Baltimore Metro SubwayLink (1983–present); Green Line/Orange Line (1983–2020)

Specifications
- Car body construction: Stainless steel
- Train length: 150 ft (46 m) (single pair); 300 ft (91 m) (4-car train)
- Car length: 75 ft (23 m)
- Width: 10 ft (3.0 m)
- Height: 12 ft (3.7 m)
- Doors: 3 pairs per side
- Maximum speed: 75 mph (120 km/h) (design); 65 mph (105 km/h) (service)
- Traction system: Westinghouse chopper control
- Traction motors: Westinghouse DC motor
- Electric systems: 700-750 V DC third rail
- Current collection: Contact shoe
- UIC classification: Bo'Bo'+Bo'Bo'
- AAR wheel arrangement: B-B+B-B
- Track gauge: 4 ft 8 1/2 in (1,435 mm) standard gauge

The Budd Universal Transit Vehicle is a heavy rail electric multiple unit built by the Budd Company (under the name Transit America) from 1983 to 1986, for the Baltimore Metro SubwayLink and Miami-Dade Metrorail systems.

== Description ==
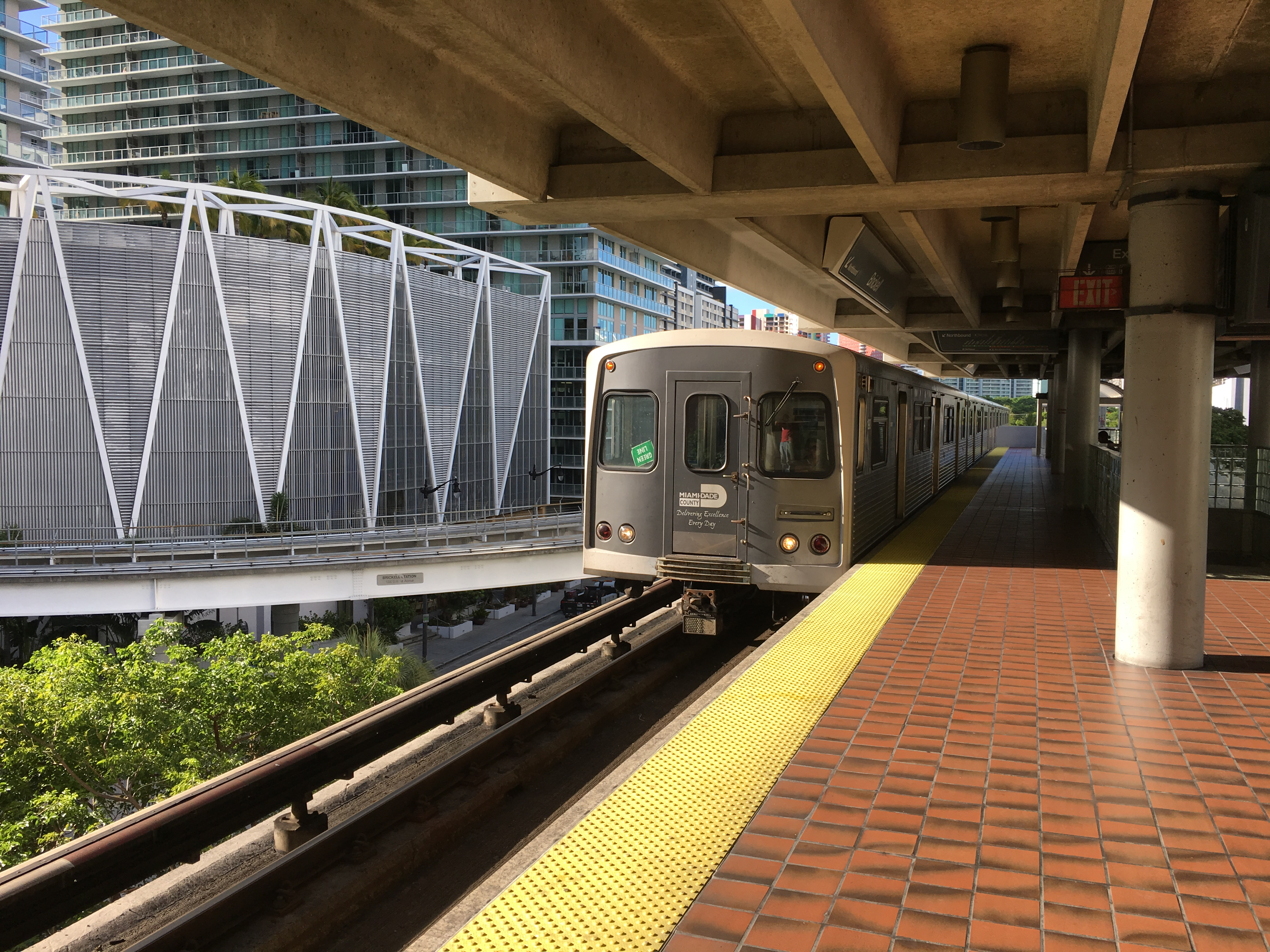
Budd Universal Transit Vehicle as seen on the Miami-Dade Metrorail

The Universal Transit Vehicle was manufactured by the Budd Company at their Red Lion plant in Northeast Philadelphia. The appearance of cars on the SubwayLink are identical to those on the Metrorail (and vice versa), as the two agencies built their systems at the same time and saved money by sharing a single order.

Trains draw power from the electric third rail. The cars are 75 feet (22.86 m) long, 10 feet (3.05 m) wide, and have a top speed of 70 mph (110 km/h). Each car can hold up to 166 passengers (76 seated, 90 standing). Cars are semi-permanently attached in married pairs, and were arranged as 4-car trains on the Metrorail. The trains on the SubwayLink are arranged as 2-, 4- and 6-car consists.

The SubwayLink fleet had a significant overhaul between 2002 and 2005. Seats were reupholstered, and the floors were replaced. External destination rollsigns were replaced with LED displays; internal systems that display train destinations and upcoming stop announcements were also installed. There was a planned refurbishment for the cars on the Metrorail, but later it was decided to purchase new cars after it was found that the fleet was never maintained properly.

=== Replacement ===
Because of the improper maintenance of the Metrorail cars, Miami-Dade announced a $313 million purchase of 136 new Metrorail cars from Hitachi Rail Italy (formerly AnsaldoBreda) in November 2012. The first new trainset entered service in early December 2017.

In July 2017, the Maryland Transit Administration announced the purchase of 78 new railcars also from Hitachi Rail Italy to replace the entire SubwayLink fleet. The cars are similar in appearance to those used on the Miami Metrorail. The first new trainset entered service on January 9, 2026.

== See also ==
- Breda A650 - A similar fleet operated by the Los Angeles Metro Rail on its B and D lines.
