= Breda A650 =

EMU subway car built for use on the Los Angeles Metro Rail system

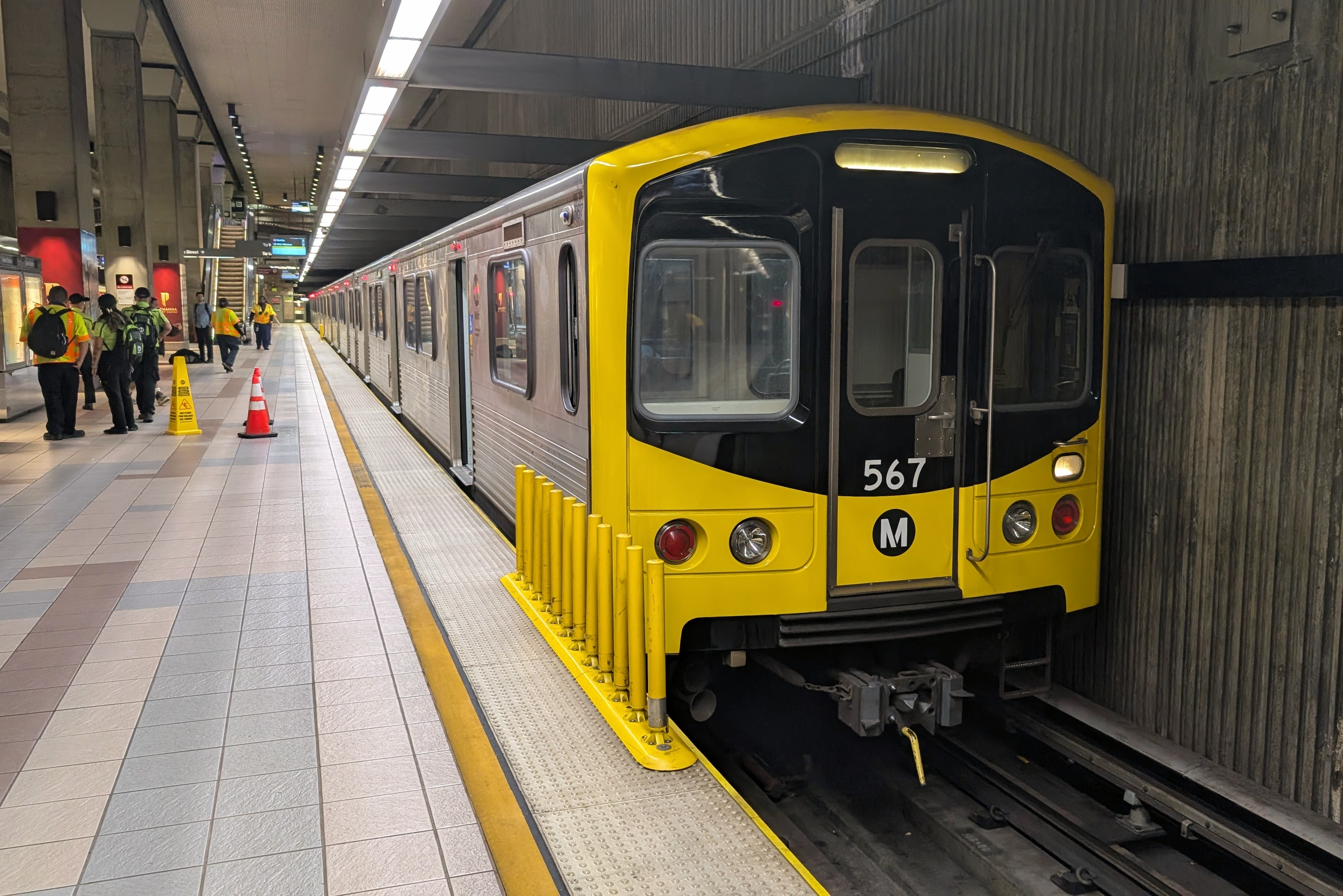
- A refurbished B Line A650 train at Union Station

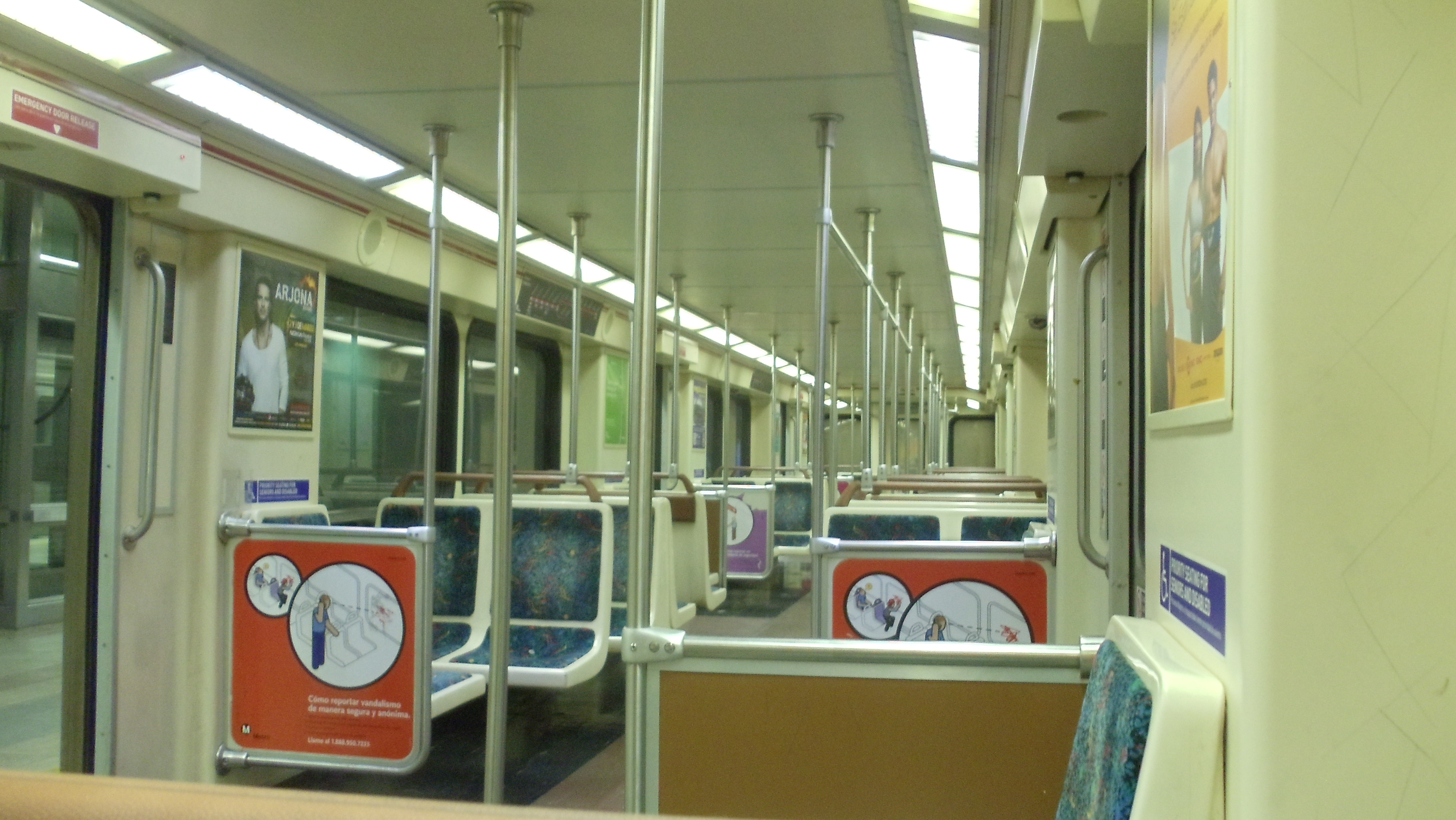
- Interior of a Breda A650
- In service: 1993–present
- Manufacturer: Breda
- Built at: Pistoia, Italy
- Constructed: 1988–1997
- Entered service: 1993–1998
- Refurbished: Talgo (2020–2022; cancelled); Woojin Industrial Systems (2024–present)
- Number built: 104
- Number in service: 88
- Successor: CRRC HR4000; Hyundai Rotem HR5000
- Formation: 2 cars per unit, 2–3 units per train
- Fleet numbers: 501–604
- Capacity: 301 crush load, 238 standing, 122 seated per 2-car set
- Depot: Division 20 (Los Angeles River)
- Line served: B Line D Line

Specifications
- Car body construction: Stainless steel
- Train length: 148 ft 9 in (45.35 m) (2-car set)
- Car length: 74 ft 4.7 in (22,675 mm)
- Width: 10 ft 0 in (3,048 mm)
- Height: 12 ft 0.70 in (3,675.5 mm)
- Floor height: 3 ft 8 3/4 in (1,136 mm)
- Doors: 2 × 3 per car
- Wheel diameter: 34 1/2 in (876.3 mm)
- Wheelbase: 7 ft 6 9/16 in (2.3 m)
- Maximum speed: 70 mph (110 km/h)
- Weight: 80,000 lb (36 t)
- Traction system: 501–530: ABB chopper control; 531–604: GE 2-level GTO–VVVF
- Traction motors: 501–530: ABB Traction 427.1 hp (318.5 kW) DC motor; 531-604: GE 5GEB 250.1 hp (186.5 kW) 3-phase AC induction motor
- Acceleration: 3.0 mph/s (1.34 m/s^{2})
- Deceleration: 2.2 mph/s (1 m/s^{2}) (service); 3.0 mph/s (1.35 m/s^{2}) (emergency)
- Electric systems: Third rail, 750 V DC
- Current collection: Contact shoe
- UIC classification: Bo′Bo′+Bo′Bo′
- AAR wheel arrangement: B-B+B-B
- Safety systems: ATC, ATP, ATO
- Coupling system: Tomlinson
- Track gauge: 4 ft 8 1/2 in (1,435 mm) standard gauge

The A650 is an electric multiple unit rapid transit (known locally as a subway) car built for use on the Los Angeles Metro Rail system. The cars were manufactured by the Italian company Breda at its Pistoia plant in Italy between 1988 and 1997 and are used on the Metro B and D Lines.

== Details ==
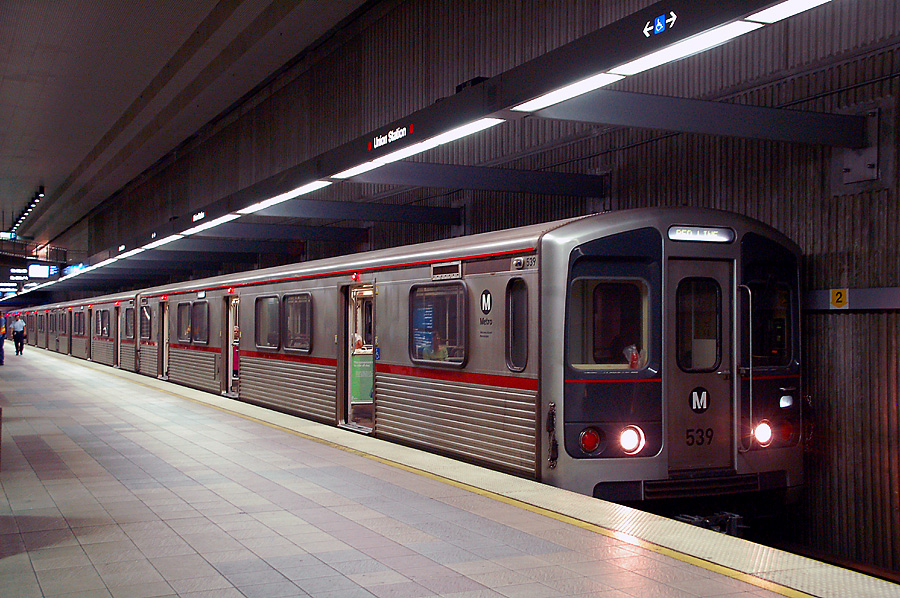
Breda A650 on the Red Line in 2008, prior to their refurbishment in the 2020s

In June 1988, the Southern California Rapid Transit District (SCRTD) awarded a contract to Italian company Breda Costruzioni Ferroviarie to build 30 train cars for the Red Line at a cost of $54 million, with options for additional cars. They were built to the same specification as the Budd Universal Transit Vehicle, built for Baltimore and Miami in the mid 1980s – with artists impressions of the Red Line showing these trains.

The first batch of 30 cars was built in Pistoia, Italy between 1988 and 1993. They use chopper control and DC traction motors designed by Garrett AiResearch in Torrance California, later manufactured by ABB Traction They entered service in 1993 with the opening of the Red Line.

To allow service on further phases of the Red Line, Los Angeles Metro ordered an additional 42 cars in 1994, and a further 32 vehicles in 1996. These cars were built in Pistoia between 1995 and 1997, with the first arriving in Los Angeles in September 1996. Unlike the first batch, these trains use VVVF inverter control using GTO thyristor technology manufactured by General Electric to power AC (3-phase AC 4-pole asynchronous) traction motors, which are lighter and more efficient than DC traction motors. There also use lights above the doors that flash when the chime sounds before the doors close.

Costing $1.8 million each, the trains usually run in four to six car consists, and feature automatic train control, air conditioning, emergency intercoms, wheelchair spaces and emergency braking. Initially it was planned to upgrade the DC-motored cars with AC motors, and it was claimed vehicles of either type could run with each other. However, this never occurred and the original batch cars retain their DC motors, and the two types rarely operate in the same train.

The fleet is maintained at the Division 20 yard, located south of Union Station on Santa Fe Drive near 4th Street on the west bank of the Los Angeles River in Downtown Los Angeles.

=== Refurbishment ===
In 2016, Metro awarded a contract to Talgo to overhaul and refurbish the newer 74 trains at a cost of $73 million, as they were more heavily used. This contract was cancelled in 2022 for "non-performance" after work had started on 14 trains. Talgo and Metro subsequently sued each other for breach of contract.

In 2024, Metro awarded a contract to Woojin Industrial Systems to overhaul and refurbish the 74 newer trains at a cost of $213 million, with the older trains to be replaced by the CRRC HR4000 when they enter service. Work is to be completed before the 2028 Olympic Games and Paralympic Games.

== Replacement ==
In 2014, Metro decided to order a new subway fleet rather than overhauling the older Breda A650 trains. In 2017, 64 CRRC HR4000 cars were ordered – which will replace the first batch of A650 trains when they enter service in 2024. It was initially planned to replace the second batch of A650 trains with further orders of HR4000s, but instead they will be replaced by the Hyundai Rotem HR5000 trains, which were ordered in 2024.

== Named trains ==
Two trains have been named:

- #501 – Richard Gallagher – named after Richard Gallagher, SCRTD Director of Rapid Transit Planning in the 1980s
- #502 – Thomas G. Neusom – named after Thomas G. Neusom, President of SCRTD Board of Directors between 1980 and 1982

== In popular culture ==
Because Los Angeles is the home of many television and production agencies, A650 subway cars are featured in countless commercials, TV shows and movies.

The Breda A650 was depicted as being burned in the tunnel between MacArthur Park and Metro Center in the 1997 film Volcano, when a lava flow through the tunnel causes all passengers and conductor to pass out on board. The A650 was featured in Speed when the emergency brake feature stops and the train derails.

Incubus filmed part of the video for their 1996 song Take Me to Your Leader with a segment featuring lead singer Brandon Boyd portraying a humorous caveman riding the subway.

It is also featured in S.W.A.T. and it is seen taking a nosedive plummet from a mountain as the cataclysmic events of December 21, 2012, unfold in 2012.

== See also ==
- Los Angeles Metro Rail rolling stock
- Budd Universal Transit Vehicle - A similar model operated by the Baltimore Metro SubwayLink and (formerly) the Miami Metrorail
