= Westlake/MacArthur Park station =

Rapid transit station in Los Angeles, California

Westlake/MacArthur Park
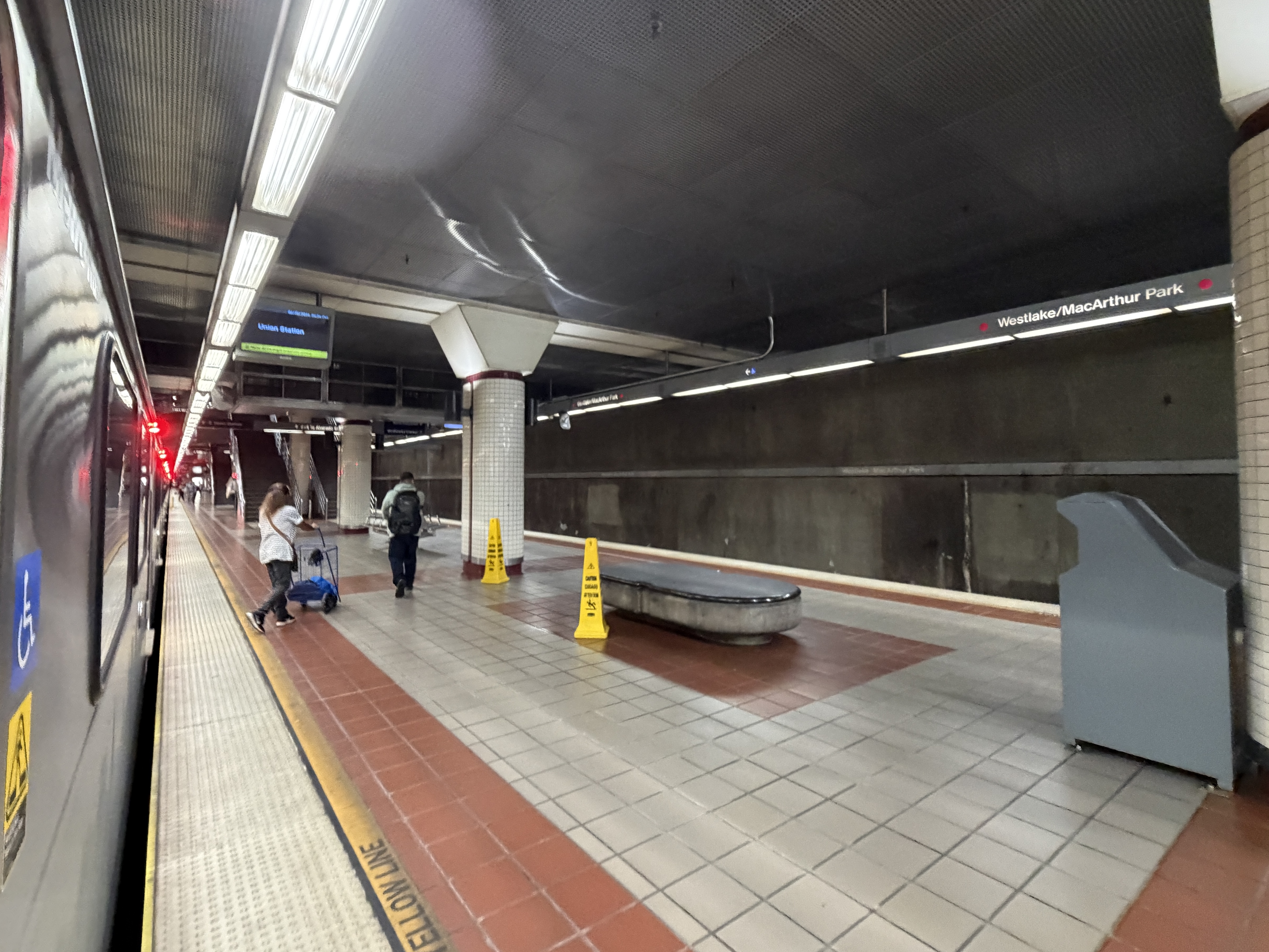
- Westlake/MacArthur Park station platform

General information
- Location: 660 South Alvarado Street; Los Angeles, California
- Coordinates: 34.0570°N 118.2764°W
- Owner: Los Angeles Metro
- Platforms: 1 island platform
- Tracks: 2
- Connections: Los Angeles Metro Bus; LADOT DASH

Construction
- Structure type: Underground
- Parking: 6 spaces, kiss and ride facility
- Cycle facilities: Metro Bike Share station, and racks

History
- Opened: January 30, 1993
- Former names: Wilshire/Alvarado

Passengers
- FY 2026: 5,019 (avg. wkdy boardings)

Services
| Preceding station | Metro Rail | Following station |
|---|---|---|
| Wilshire/Vermont toward North Hollywood | B Line | 7th Street/Metro Center toward Union Station |
| Wilshire/Vermont toward Wilshire/La Cienega | D Line | 7th Street/Metro Center toward Union Station |
Location

Westlake/MacArthur Park station is an underground rapid transit station on the B Line and D Line of the Los Angeles Metro Rail system. The station is located near the intersection of Wilshire Boulevard and Alvarado Street in the Los Angeles neighborhood of Westlake, after which the station is named, along with MacArthur Park, which is located across the street. Unlike most of Metro's other underground stations, which are built directly under a street, the Westlake/MacArthur Park platform is located south of Wilshire Boulevard and between 7th Street. This design allowed a train storage area to be built under MacArthur Park, and necessitated draining the lake for several years to excavate and build the tracks.

Westlake/MacArthur Park is one of L.A's five original subway stations: when it opened in 1993, it was the western terminus of the Red Line, before completion of the Wilshire/Western branch (now called the D Line) in 1996 and the North Hollywood branch (now called the B Line) in 2000.

Right outside the station, one can see MacArthur Park and a street scene of the neighborhood's largely Mexican, Salvadoran, Guatemalan and Honduran residents stand in stark contrast to the metropolitan environment dotted with skyscrapers just one station to the east.

== History ==
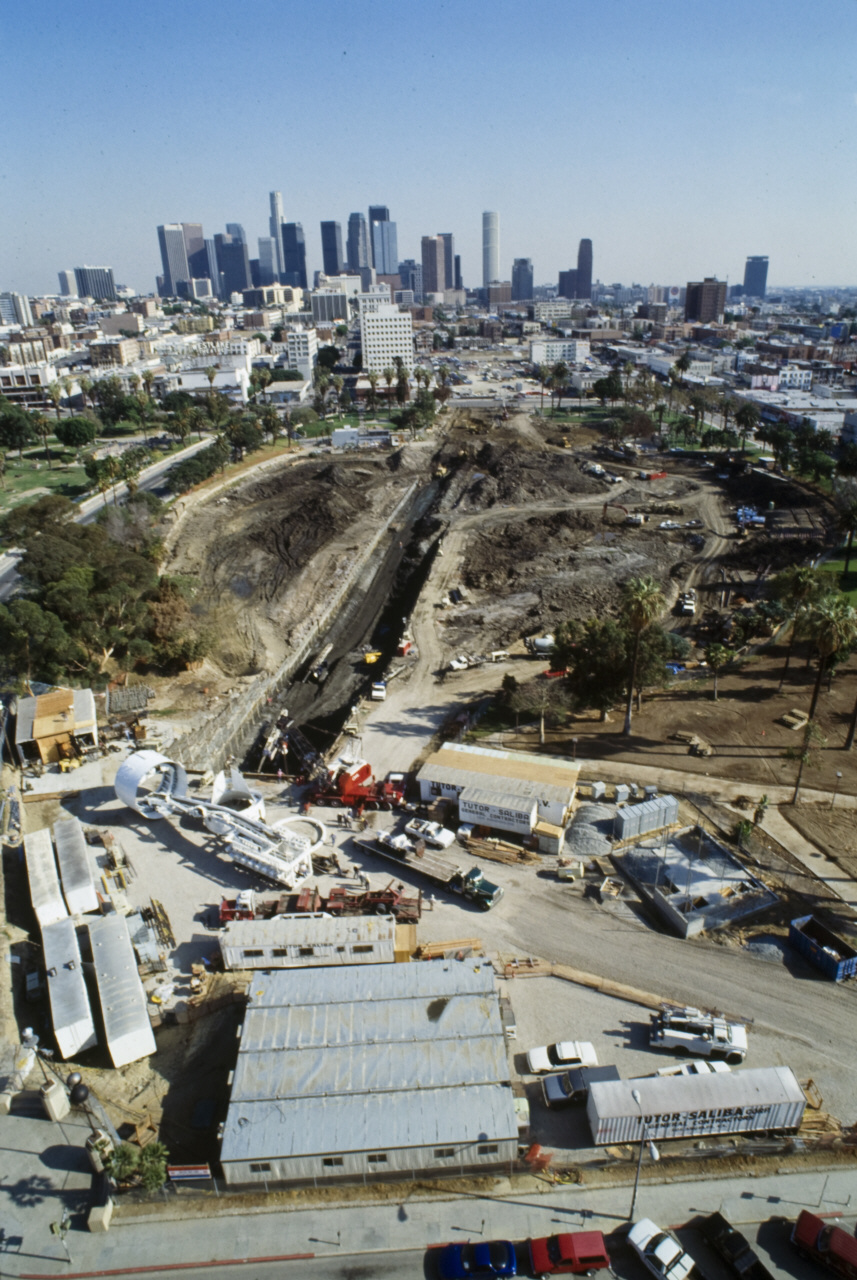
MacArthur Park in 1993 during construction of the Metro Rail line

Westlake/MacArthur Park was constructed by the Southern California Rapid Transit District, which later became part of today's LA Metro, as part of the first minimum operating segment (MOS-1) of the Metro Rail subway line. Ground was broken for the project in September 1986. Construction of the short 4.5-mile (7.2 km) starter line was challenging, and the Westlake/MacArthur Park station was one of the most ambitious parts of the project.

Crews built a storage and turnback location for trains under MacArthur Park. Building the tunnel with a “pocket track” to store subway cars involved completely draining the eight-acre MacArthur Park Lake and digging a cut-and-cover tunnel. After construction, crews refilled with 20 million gallons of water that required seven days to fill and beautified the entire park, adding a fountain, trees, benches and lighting.

The improvements were welcomed by businesses in the area. Before construction began in the late 1980s, MacArthur Park's once glittering reputation had decayed as gangs and drug dealers came into the area.

The MOS-1 segment along with Westlake/MacArthur Park station opened in January 1993. Ridership on the short line was slow at first, but one major beneficiary of the new line was Langer's Deli, located about a block away from this station. The subway made it easy for downtown workers to come over to the restaurant for lunch. The owners of Langer's later credited the subway and the improvements to MacArthur Park with saving their business, which had been struggling in the 1980s.

Westlake/MacArthur Park station served as the western terminus for trains for three and a half years, until the opening of MOS-2A along Wilshire Boulevard in July 1996.

== Service ==
=== Hours and frequency ===
B Line trains run every day between approximately 4:30 a.m. and midnight. D Line trains run every day between approximately 5 a.m. and midnight. Towards North Hollywood or Wilshire/La Cienega, trains operate every 10 minutes throughout the day. Early morning and night service is approximately every 20 minutes. Towards Union Station, trains run every five minutes throughout the day. Early morning and night service is approximately every 10 minutes.

=== Connections ===
As of September 10, 2023, the following connections are available:

- LADOT DASH: E, Pico Union/Echo Park
- Los Angeles Metro Bus: 2, 18, 20, 51, 93, Rapid 720

=== Parking ===
The station has a small 19-space surface lot off South Westlake Avenue, designated for kiss-and-ride use. On weekdays, approximately 100 additional spaces are available in the parking garage of the MacArthur Park Apartments across the street.

== Station artwork ==
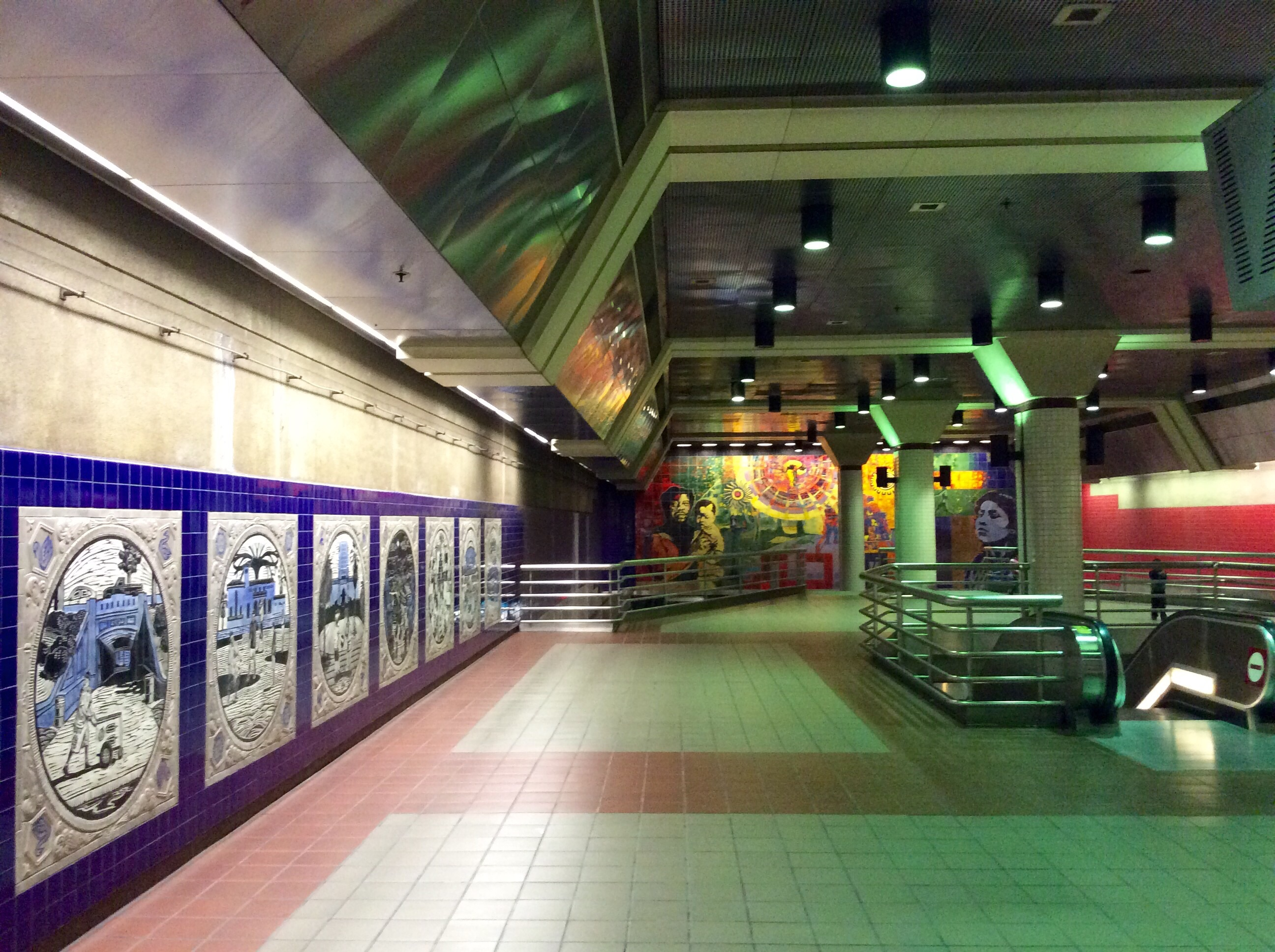
Westlake/MacArthur Park station mezzanine, featuring various artworks

This station has two tile murals designed by Francisco Letelier, entitled El Sol (The Sun) and La Luna (The Moon). The station also has artwork by Therman Statom.

The porcelain murals, by Los Angeles artist Sonia Romero and fabricated by Mosaika Art & Design, were named one of the best public art projects in the United States by the organization Americans for the Arts.

Langer's Deli is featured in one of 13 ceramic mosaic murals located inside the MacArthur Park station.

== Notable places nearby ==
- Consulate General of Mexico.
- Grier-Musser Museum
- Langer's Deli
- The MacArthur historic building, also known as the Park Plaza Hotel
- Susana Machado Bernard House and Barn
- Westlake Theater
- Teatro Frida Kahlo

== In popular culture ==
The station was featured in the film Volcano as the Red Line subway outside MacArthur Park where a massive volcano erupted, causing an earthquake that derails Train no. 526 that was in the tunnel, with lava eventually engulfing and melting it.
