= Hyundai Rotem HR5000 =

Future rapid transit car for the Los Angeles Metro Rail system

- Conceptual design of HR5000
- Manufacturer: Hyundai Rotem
- Assembly: Palmdale, California, US (Kinki Sharyo)
- Replaced: Breda A650 (second batch)
- Constructed: 2026—present
- Number under construction: 176
- Number built: 6
- Fleet numbers: 5001–5182
- Depot: Division 20 (Los Angeles River)
- Line served: B Line D Line

Specifications
- Electric systems: Third rail, 750 V DC
- Current collection: Contact shoe
- Track gauge: 4 ft 8 1/2 in (1,435 mm) standard gauge

The HR5000 is an electric multiple unit rapid transit car ordered from Hyundai Rotem for the Los Angeles Metro Rail's B and D lines.

Following a decision by the Los Angeles County Metropolitan Transportation Authority (Metro) not to purchase additional CRRC HR4000 trains, bids were sought for new subway trains. In January 2024, 182 cars were ordered from Hyundai Rotem, with options for 50 more cars. These will enter service prior to the 2028 Olympic Games and Paralympic Games, with all trains in service by 2030.

== History ==
As of 2025, the Metro Rail subway fleet is at least 32 years old, with the Breda A650 trains built in two batches between 1988 and 1997 and newer CRRC HR4000 trains which entered service in late 2024. New trains will allow for future replacement of all Breda A650 trains, expanded train service including a four-minute train frequency, and extensions of the D Line over three phases.

Cars will be delivered as married pairs, each with a capacity of 245 passengers. Trains will be capable of running in multiple with up to three married pairs at a time. Trains will enter service prior to the 2028 Olympic Games and Paralympic Games, with all trains in service by 2030.

=== Contract ===
In 2017, Metro awarded a contract to CRRC for 64 trains, with contract options for 218 cars. These HR4000 trains were planned to enter service in 2020, but introduction to service was delayed until late 2024. Construction delays for trains were caused by supply chain issues as a result of the COVID-19 pandemic, as well as compliance with the Uyghur Forced Labor Prevention Act. Following these construction delays, and the passing of the Transit Infrastructure Vehicle Security Act by Congress in 2019 which prevents the use of further federal funding for CRRC, Metro decided not to exercise the options in the CRRC HR4000 contract in 2022.

In December 2022, Metro began procuring new subway trains with a request for proposals. Three bidders took part: Hitachi Rail, Hyundai Rotem and Stadler Rail. All three manufacturers have production facilities in the United States. In February 2024, a $663.7 million contract for 182 cars was awarded to Hyundai Rotem, with options for 50 more cars. Although Hyundai Rotem's bid was more expensive than Stadler, Metro indicated that the contract was not solely awarded on price.

=== Production ===
In May 2025, Hyundai announced that Kinki Sharyo would complete the final assembly of the trains at their facility in Palmdale, California. By August 2026, the first pre-production train was undergoing testing at the Osong Railway Comprehensive Test Track, near Osong, South Korea. The first married pair set was delivered by November 2026.

== See also ==
- Los Angeles Metro Rail rolling stock
