= CRRC Massachusetts =

Chinese-American train manufacturer

CRRC MA Co., Ltd.
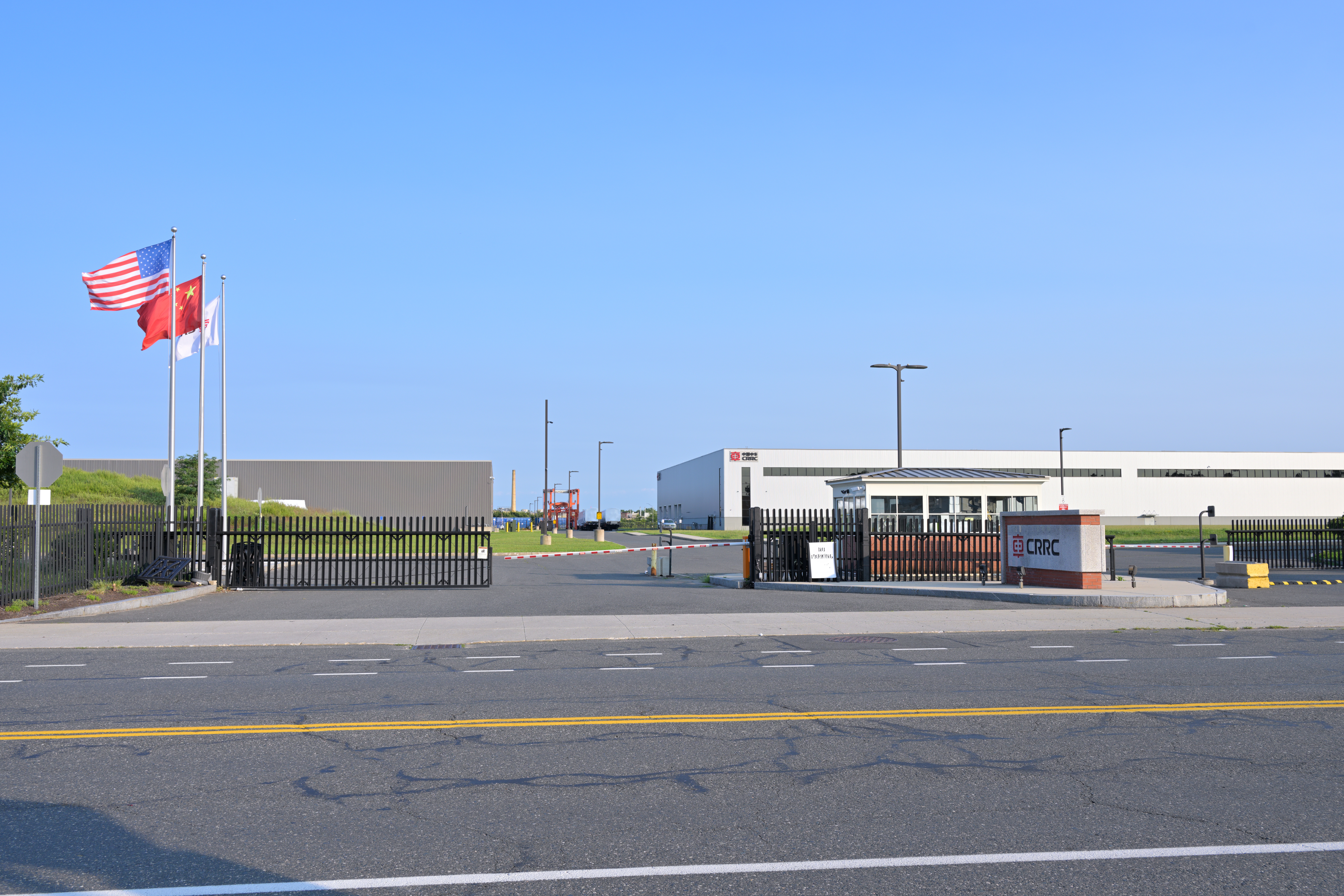
- CRRC's plant in Springfield, MA
- Formerly: CNR MA
- Type: Subsidiary
- Industry: Rolling stock
- Founded: 2014–2015
- Headquarters: Quincy, Massachusetts
- Area served: United States
- Products: CRRC HR4000; MBTA Orange Line 1400–1500 series (current stock) and MBTA Red Line 1900–2100 series
- Number of employees: 258 (177 Union)
- Parent: CRRC
- Website: www.crrcma.com

CRRC MA Co., Ltd. is a Chinese-American rolling stock manufacturer in Springfield, Massachusetts. It is part of the larger Chinese state-owned rolling stock manufacturer CRRC. Its offices and company headquarters are located in Quincy, Massachusetts.

This Springfield facility is responsible for manufacturing and delivering metro and commuter rail cars for the MBTA and Los Angeles Metro.

== History ==
CRRC MA was first established as CNR MA in 2014. It won a state contract to manufacture new railcars for the MBTA Red and Orange lines within the state of Massachusetts. At the time, no railcar manufacturing facilities existed in Massachusetts.

The new 150,000-square-ft assembly facility was built on the former site of a New England Westinghouse Company property, and manufacturing began shortly after the facility's opening.

=== Contracts and delays ===
In March 2017, the company was awarded a $137.5 million contract to build 45 train cars for SEPTA, with the cars expected to arrive in Philadelphia in 2019. A month later, they had won a contract to build the HR4000 series cars for the Los Angeles Metro Rail, and deliver the entire base order of 64 subway cars by September 2021.

On July 2, 2019, SEPTA and CRRC agreed to a six-month extension on the delivery deadline for the 45 Springfield-built double-decker commuter rail cars. A few weeks later, Congress banned federal funding for new railcars for practically all Chinese-made buses and trains, citing connections with the People's Liberation Army. However, funding from other sources is still allowed, but it is rare for this to happen.

Some delays had been found in the factory, but there was work to improve the situation as of early 2022. However, quality control issues still have surfaced. Federal transportation officials visited the Springfield facility in March 2023 as part of its "scheduled review" of compliance with the Buy America provision.

In December 2022, the MBTA accused the CRRC MA of abandoning its core values after an MBTA engineer inspected a power cable and found failures, prompting the MBTA to pull nine Springfield-built Orange Line cars from service.

CRRC MA notified MBTA officials in January 2023 that they would not be able to deliver the remaining Orange and Red Line railcars by December 2023 and September 2026, respectively.

In August 2023, Los Angeles Metro received its first trainset of the 64-car order. The second MBTA Red Line trainset entered service in January 2024, a few years after the first had entered operation in December 2020.

In late March 2024, the state of Massachusetts and CRRC officials agreed to extend the company's deadline to deliver a total of 404 railway cars, originally due in January 2022 and September 2023, until 2029. The state also agreed to increase the contract cost by $148 million, bringing it to over $1 billion. With SEPTA not receiving a single car due to delays, it had announced it would terminate the contract for cause.

As of December 30, 2025, CRRC MA has closed the 152-car order for the MBTA's Orange Line, and is continuing to produce the Red Line cars, with 58 out of the 252 cars being delivered. For LA Metro, 40 out of the 64 cars have been delivered with a final delivery date of 2027.

== Products ==
=== Rapid transit ===
- MBTA Red Line 1900-series
- MBTA Orange Line 1400-series
- Los Angeles Metro Rail HR4000

=== Coaches ===
- Double-decker coaches for SEPTA(Canceled 2024)

== Gallery ==
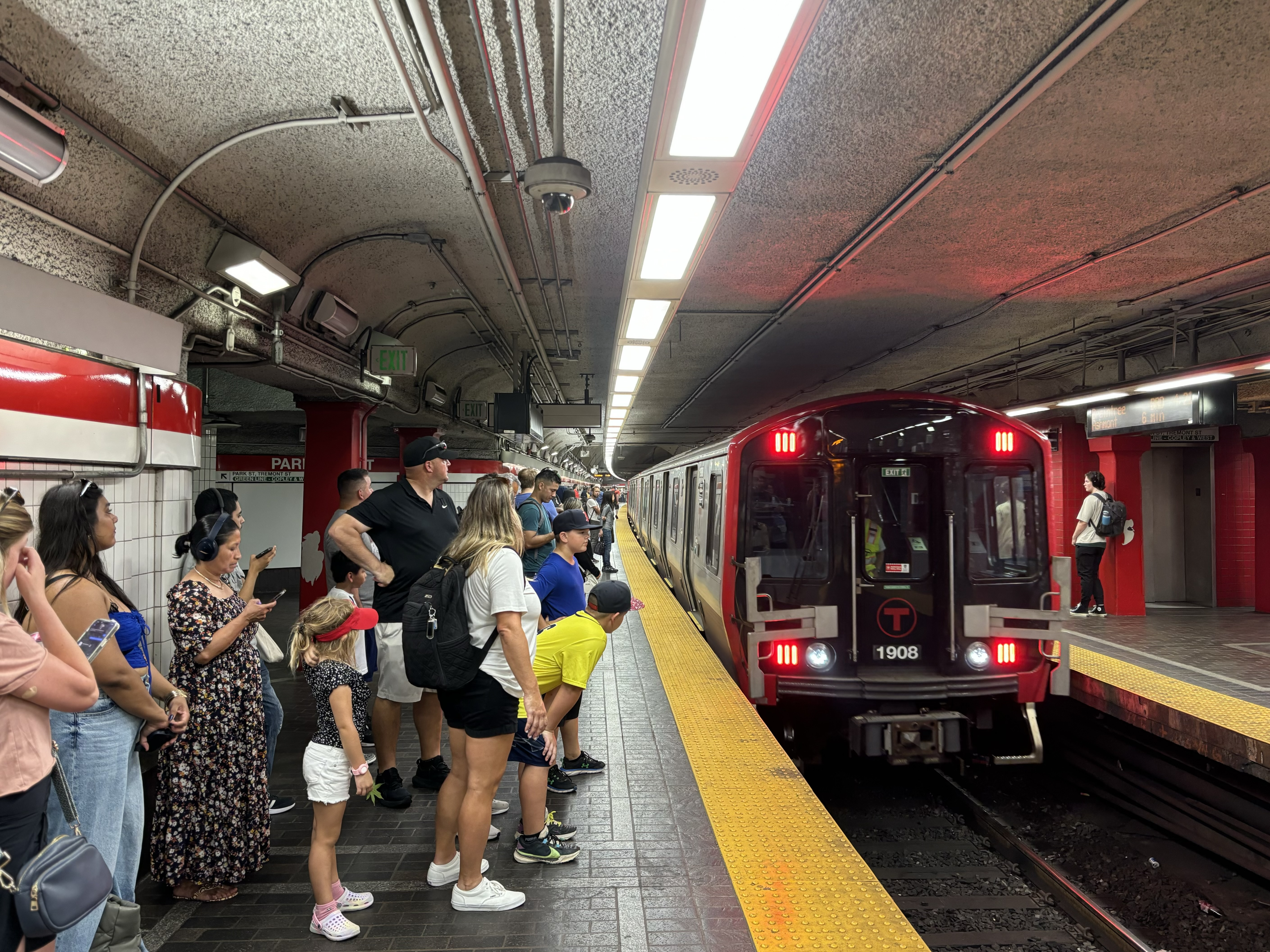
1900-series MBTA Red Line train in service in July 2024

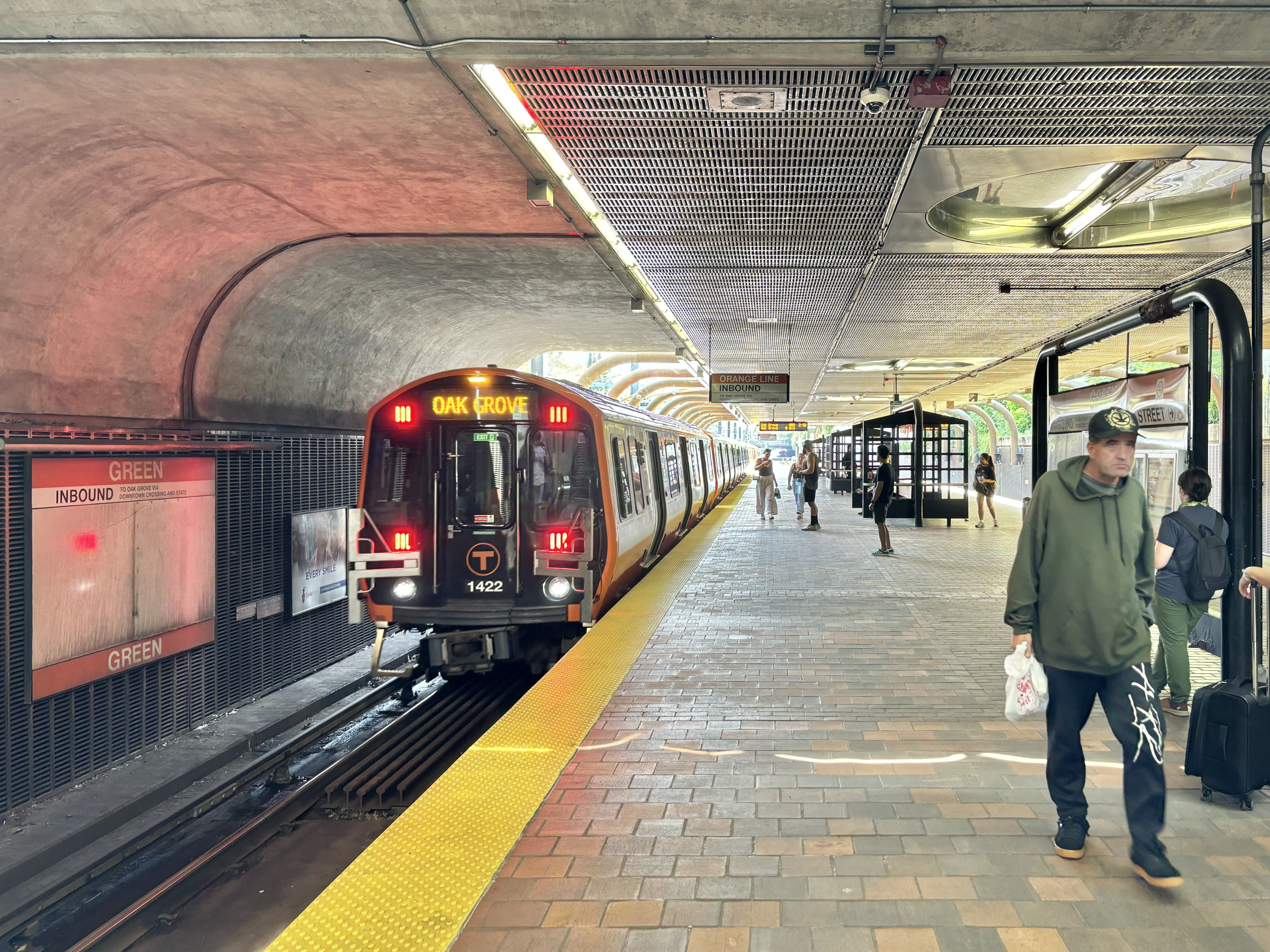
1400-series MBTA Orange Line train in service in July 2024

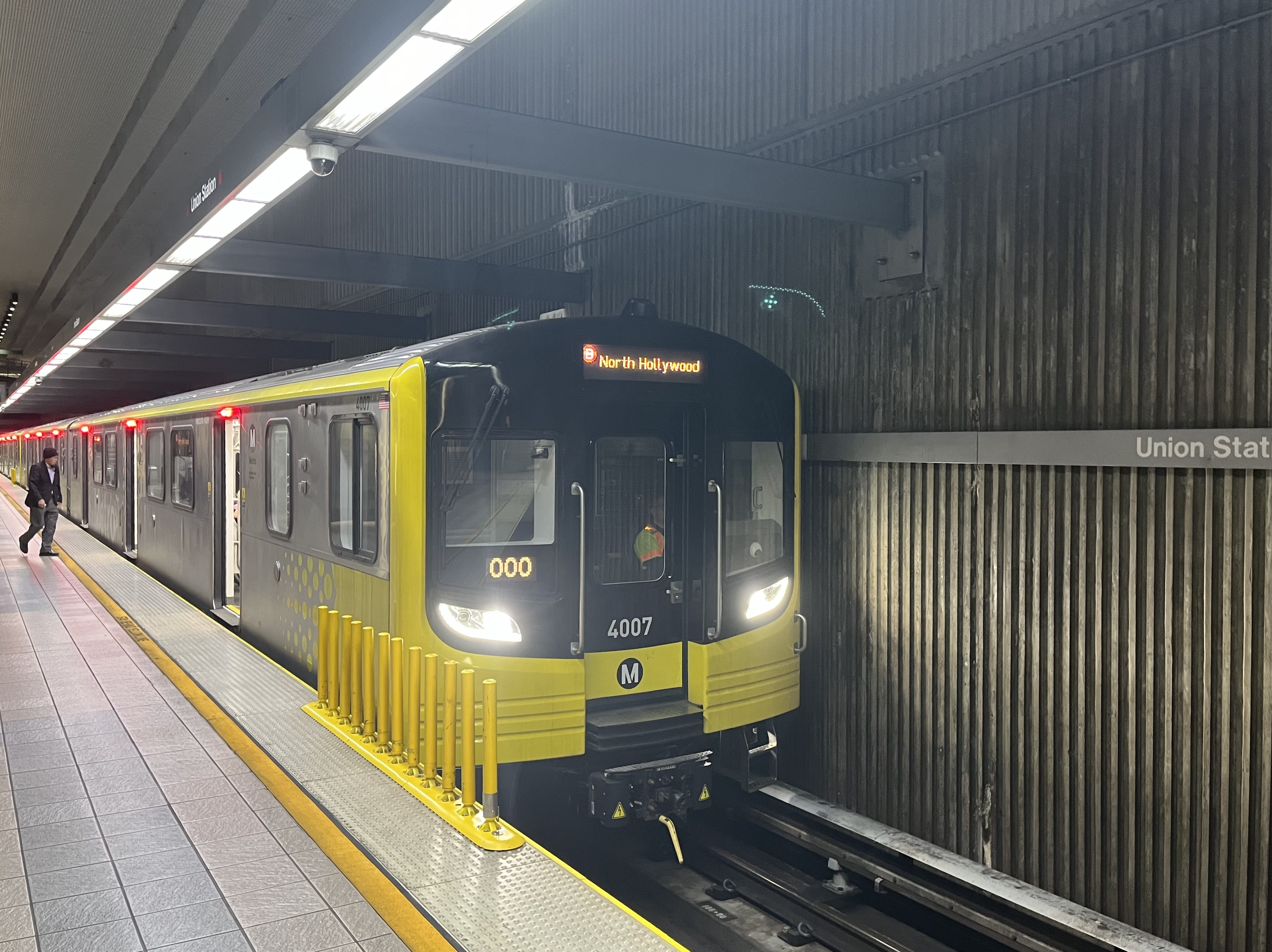
HR4000 train for Los Angeles Metro in service in April 2025
