= CRRC HR4000 =

Rapid transit car for the Los Angeles Metro Rail system

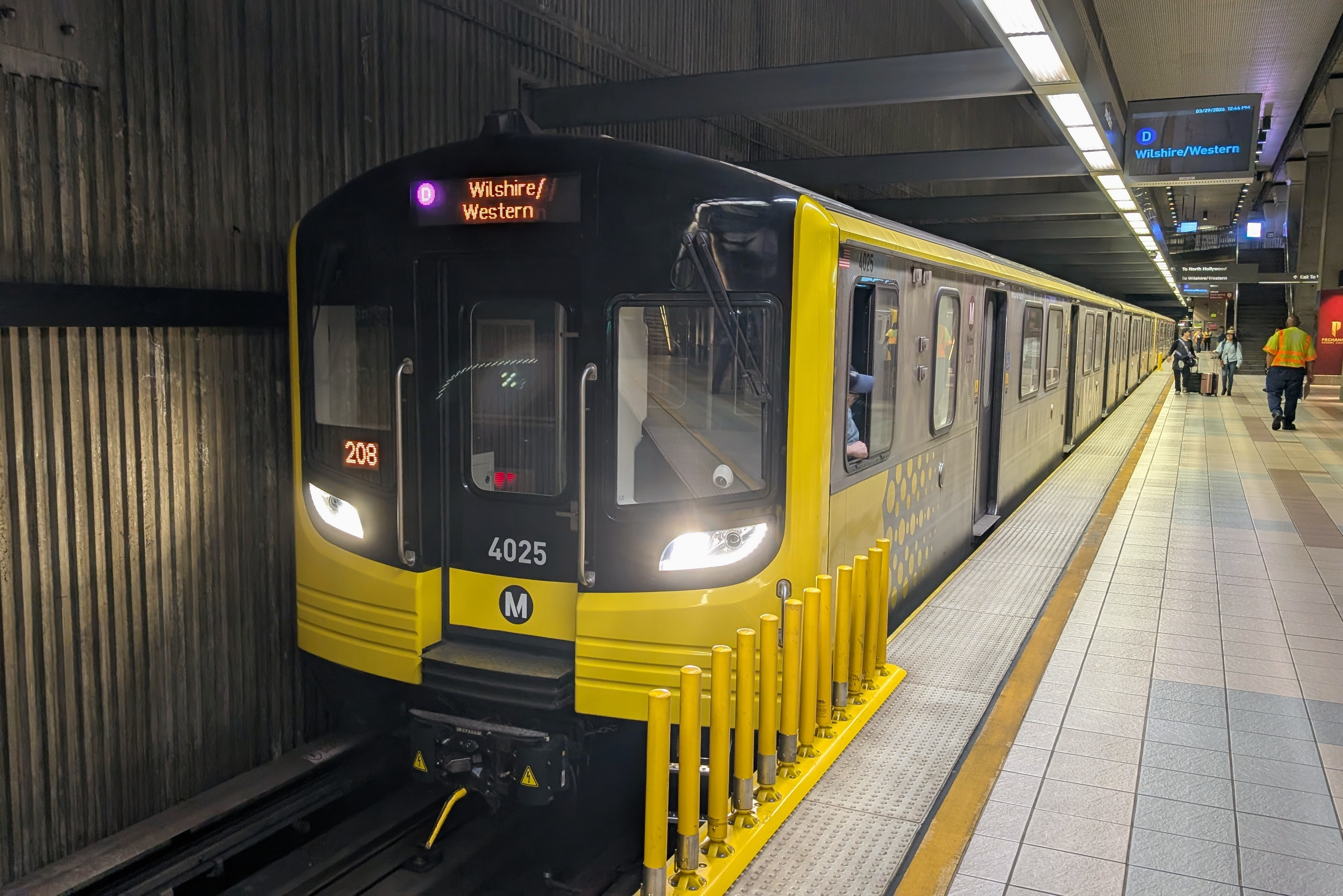
- HR4000 train at Union Station

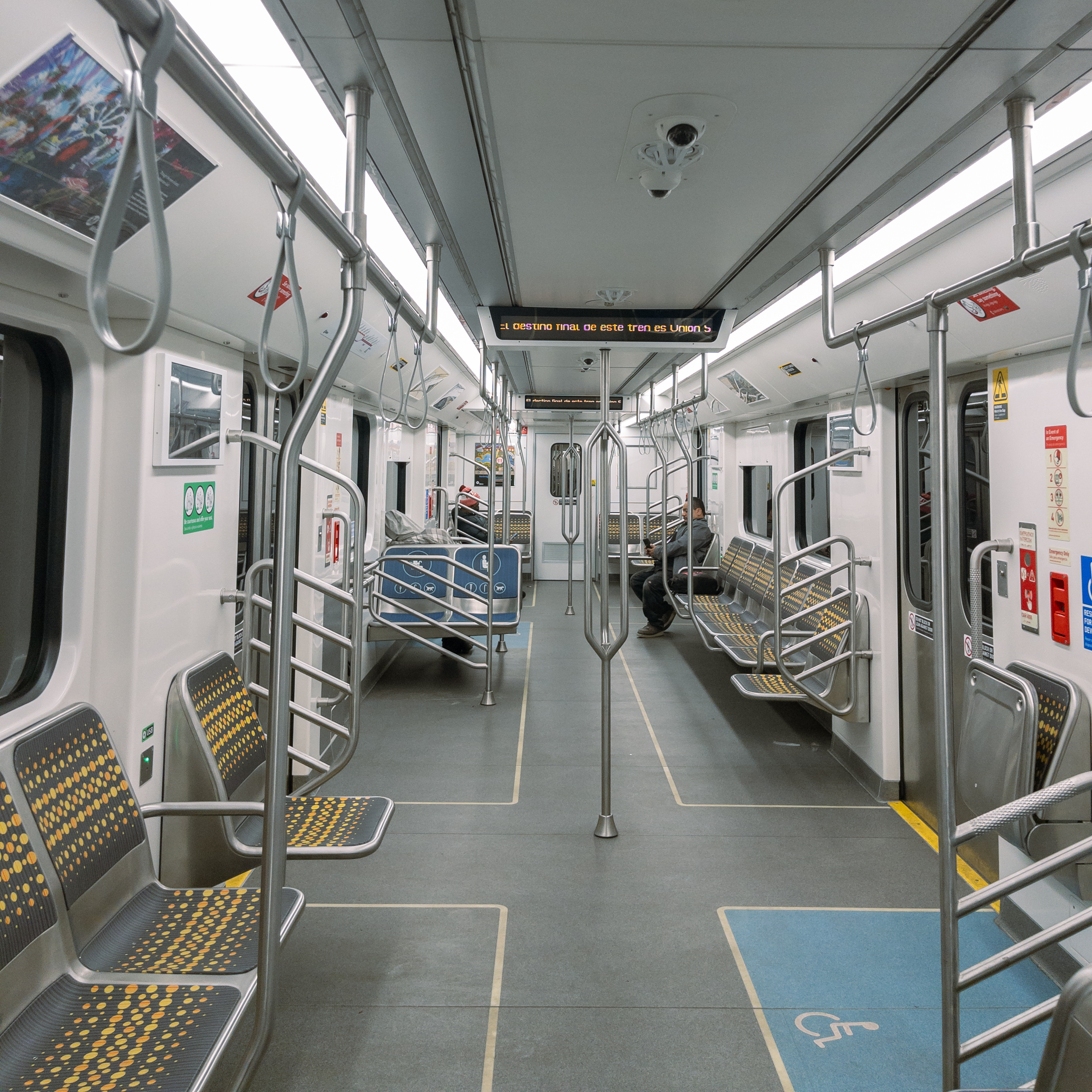
- Interior of HR4000
- In service: 2024–present
- Manufacturer: CRRC
- Built at: Changchun, China (body shells); Springfield, Massachusetts (final assembly)
- Replaced: Breda A650 (first batch)
- Constructed: 2021–present
- Entered service: December 20, 2024
- Number built: 64
- Fleet numbers: 4001–4064
- Depot: Division 20 (Los Angeles River)
- Line served: B Line D Line

Specifications
- Train length: 150 ft (45.72 m)
- Car length: 75 ft (22.86 m)
- Width: 10 ft (3,048 mm)
- Floor height: 44 3/4 in (1,136.7 mm)
- Doors: Sliding pocket, 3 per side
- Maximum speed: 70 mph (110 km/h)
- Traction system: CRRC Times Electric 2-level IGBT-VVVF
- Traction motors: 8 × TSA TME 46-17-4 259 hp (193 kW)
- Electric systems: Third rail, 750 V DC
- Current collection: Contact shoe
- UIC classification: Bo′Bo′+Bo′Bo′
- AAR wheel arrangement: B-B+B-B
- Track gauge: 4 ft 8 1/2 in (1,435 mm) standard gauge

The HR4000 is an electric multiple unit rapid transit car being manufactured by CRRC and assembled in Springfield, Massachusetts for the Los Angeles Metro Rail's B and D lines.

The Los Angeles County Metropolitan Transportation Authority (Metro) ordered 64 cars from CRRC in 2017, with options for a further 218 cars. Construction of the trains began in 2021, with the first train entering service only on the D Line on December 20, 2024, due to testing on Section 1 of the D Line Extension.

== History ==
As of 2024, the Breda A650 subway fleet is at least 26 years old, having been built in two batches between 1988 and 1997. New trains will allow for future replacement of all Breda A650 trains, expanded train service including a four minute train frequency, and extensions of the D Line over three phases.

Shortly after the groundbreaking of the D Line Extension in 2014, procurement started for new trains to run on the extension. A request for proposals was issued by Metro in June 2016. Two bids were received – CRRC and Hyundai Rotem.

In December 2016, it was recommended that the contract be awarded to CRRC, and the contract was signed in April 2017. CRRC was awarded the contract as they had the lowest price, the "highest technically rated proposal" and a U.S. content of 65%. The contract had a base order of 64 HR4000 cars – 34 cars for Section 1 of the D Line Extension and 30 cars to replace the older Breda A650 trains (cars 501-530) – at a cost of $178 million. The contract also contained options for 218 additional cars at a total cost of $647 million.

To accommodate the order for additional subway cars, yard expansion work started in 2019. As of August 2023, yard expansion is scheduled for completion in 2026. HR4000 trains were due to enter service in spring 2020, with contract completion by 2021. However, construction began in 2021 at the CRRC Massachusetts plant in Springfield, Massachusetts, using bodyshells constructed in Changchun, China. Construction was delayed due to supply chain issues as a result of the COVID-19 pandemic, as well as compliance with the Uyghur Forced Labor Prevention Act.

As of May 2023, the first cars were scheduled to be delivered in early August. On July 29, 2023, the first pair of cars (4005 and 4006) were delivered to Division 20, with the cars expected to enter revenue service sometime in 2024. Testing began in December 2023. The trains entered service on December 20th, 2024.

=== Options ===
There were 4 option orders totalling to 218 cars; 112 cars for general service expansion, 20 cars for Section 2 of the D Line Extension, 12 for Section 3 of the D Line Extension, and the remaining 74 to replace the second batch of Breda A650 trains (cars 531-604). Following construction delays, and the passing of the Transit Infrastructure Vehicle Security Act by Congress in 2019 which prevents the use of further federal funding for CRRC, Metro decided not to exercise the options in the CRRC HR4000 contract. In January 2024, Metro ordered 182 HR5000 cars from Hyundai Rotem.

== Design ==
A mockup was completed in 2019 to allow for feedback from Metro. The final design was unveiled in July 2021. The exterior design shows full-color LED destination signs, compared to the green monochrome dot-matrix flip-dot signs used with the A650s. Internally, it features more longitudinal seating than its predecessors to increase capacity (although early renders depicted against such), as well as open gangways between cars, which come in married pairs.

== See also ==
- Los Angeles Metro Rail rolling stock
