= B Line (Los Angeles Metro) =

Rapid transit line in Los Angeles, California

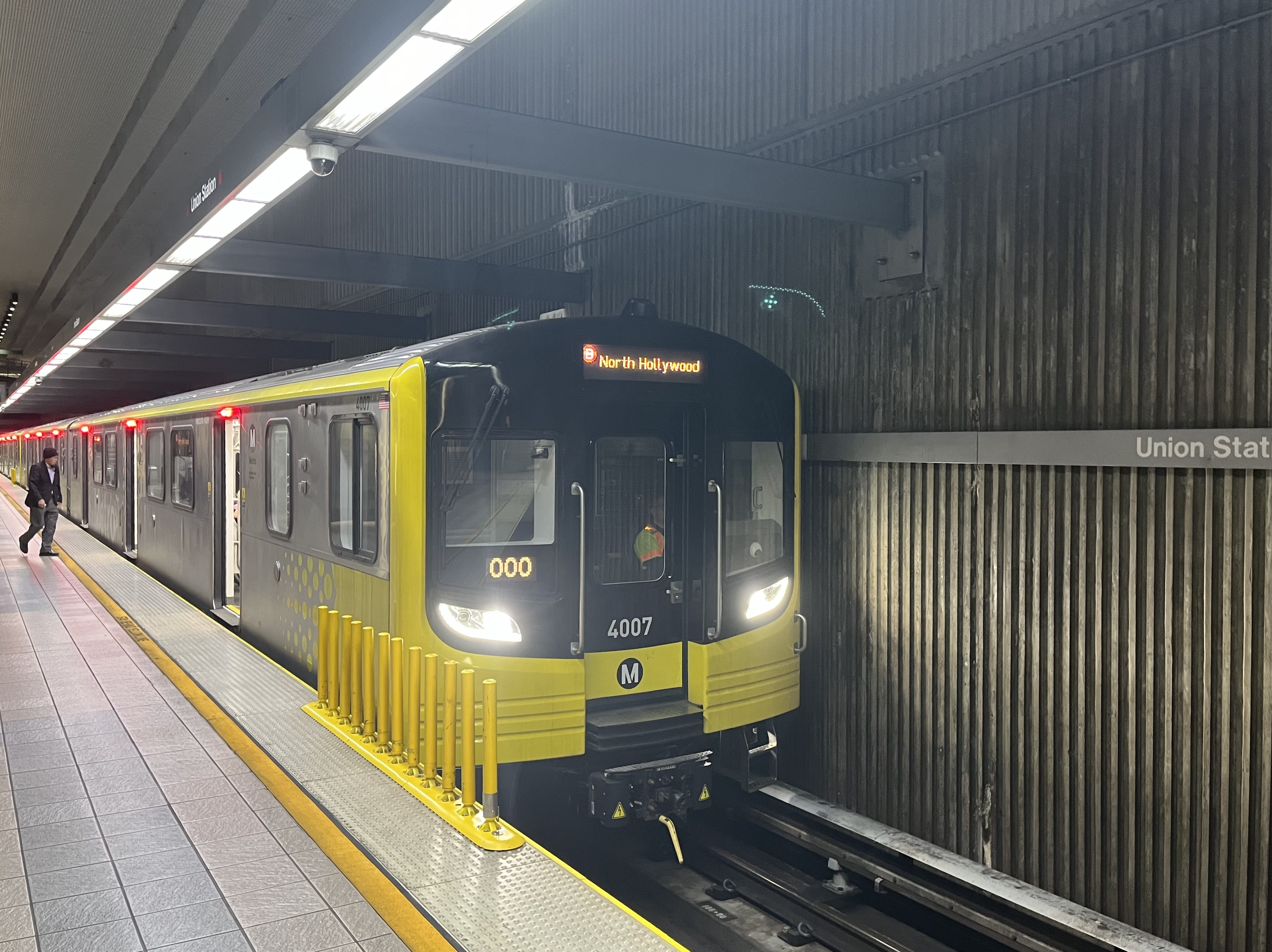
- B Line train at Union Station in 2025

Overview
- Other name: Red Line (1993–2020)
- Owner: Los Angeles Metro
- Line number: 802
- Termini: North Hollywood; Union Station
- Stations: 14
- Website: metro.net/riding/guide/b-line

Service
- Type: Rapid transit
- System: Los Angeles Metro Rail
- Depot: Division 20 (Los Angeles)
- Rolling stock: Breda A650 or CRRC HR4000 running in 4 or 6 car consists
- Daily ridership: 63,451 (weekdays, March 2026)
- Ridership: 20,991,199 (Note: Ridership data is combined for the B and D lines.) (2025) ▼6.6%

History
- Opened: January 30, 1993; 33 years ago
- Completed: June 24, 2000; 26 years ago

Technical
- Line length: 14.7 miles (23.7 km)
- Num of tracks: 2
- Character: Fully underground (except yard)
- Track gauge: 4 ft 8 1/2 in (1,435 mm) standard gauge
- Electrification: Third rail, 750 V DC
- Operating speed: 70 mph (110 km/h) (max.); 33.9 mph (54.6 km/h) (avg.)
Route map
B Line highlighted in red

The B Line (formerly the Red Line from 1993–2026) is a fully underground 14.7 mi (23.7 km) rapid transit line operating in Los Angeles, running between North Hollywood and Union Station in Downtown Los Angeles. It is one of six lines in the Los Angeles Metro Rail system, operated by Los Angeles Metro. Built in four stages between 1986 and 2000, the line cost $4.5 billion.

The B Line is one of the city's two fully-underground subway lines (along with the D Line). The two lines share tracks through Koreatown and Downtown Los Angeles. As of 2024, the combined B and D lines averaged 66,642 boardings per weekday.

In 2020, Metro renamed all of its lines using letters and colors, with the Red Line becoming the B Line (retaining the red color in its service bullet) and the Purple Line becoming the D Line.

== Service description ==
=== Route ===
The B Line is a subway that begins at North Hollywood station in North Hollywood, in the San Fernando Valley. The line turns southeast underneath Cahuenga Pass and passes through Hollywood and Koreatown, traveling east along Hollywood Boulevard and then south along Vermont Avenue. Arriving at Wilshire/Vermont station, the line merges with the D Line, and the lines continue between Wilshire Boulevard and 7th Street (and briefly Ingraham Street), where the lines interchange with the A and E light rail lines at 7th Street/Metro Center station. The lines then pass northeast through Downtown Los Angeles, passing through the Financial District, Pershing Square (near the Historic Core), and the Civic Center, before terminating at Union Station.

The B Line through Cahuenga Pass roughly follows the route of a branch of the old Pacific Electric system, although it does not use the former line's surface right-of-way.

=== Hours and frequency ===
B Line trains run every day between approximately 4:30 a.m. and midnight. Trains operate every 10 minutes during peak hours. Early morning and night service is approximately every 20 minutes.

Time	5am	6am	7am	8am–6pm	7pm	8pm	9pm–12am
Weekdays	16–20	10					20
Weekends/Holidays	20			10		20	

=== Station listing ===
The following table lists the stations of the B Line, from north to south. All stations are located in the city of Los Angeles, California.

Station	Date opened	Neighborhood	Major connections and notes
North Hollywood	June 24, 2000	North Hollywood	Park and ride: 1,085 paid spaces Future connection to North Hollywood to Pasadena Bus Rapid Transit Project
Universal City/Studio City	June 24, 2000	Studio City	Universal Studios Hollywood shuttle Park and ride: 782 paid spaces
Hollywood/Highland	June 24, 2000	Hollywood	Future connection to
Hollywood/Vine	June 12, 1999	Hollywood	
Hollywood/Western	June 12, 1999	East Hollywood	
Vermont/Sunset	June 12, 1999	East Hollywood	
Vermont/Santa Monica	June 12, 1999	East Hollywood	
Vermont/Beverly	June 12, 1999	East Hollywood	
Wilshire/Vermont	July 13, 1996	Mid-Wilshire/Koreatown	D Line
Westlake/MacArthur Park	January 30, 1993	Westlake	Park and ride: 100 spaces
7th Street/Metro Center	January 30, 1993	Downtown Los Angeles	A Line D Line E Line J Line
Pershing Square	January 30, 1993	Downtown Los Angeles	D Line J Line
Civic Center/Grand Park	January 30, 1993	Downtown Los Angeles	D Line J Line
Union Station	January 30, 1993	Downtown Los Angeles	Amtrak, LAX FlyAway and Metrolink; Paid parking: 2,189 spaces

=== Ridership ===
Note: Ridership figures are for B and D Line combined.

Annual ridership
Year	Ridership	%±
2009	47,453,332	—
2010	47,434,969	0.0%
2011	46,964,495	−1.0%
2012	48,703,612	+3.7%
2013	51,030,536	+4.8%
2014	48,645,206	−4.7%
2015	46,356,726	−4.7%
2016	45,629,352	−1.6%
2017	44,861,106	−1.7%
2018	43,301,200	−3.5%
2019	41,775,490	−3.5%
2020	22,776,524	−45.5%
2021	21,398,104	−6.1%
2022	25,767,716	+20.4%
2023	25,899,711	+0.5%
2024	22,471,851	−13.2%
2025	20,991,199	−6.6%
Source: Metro

== History ==
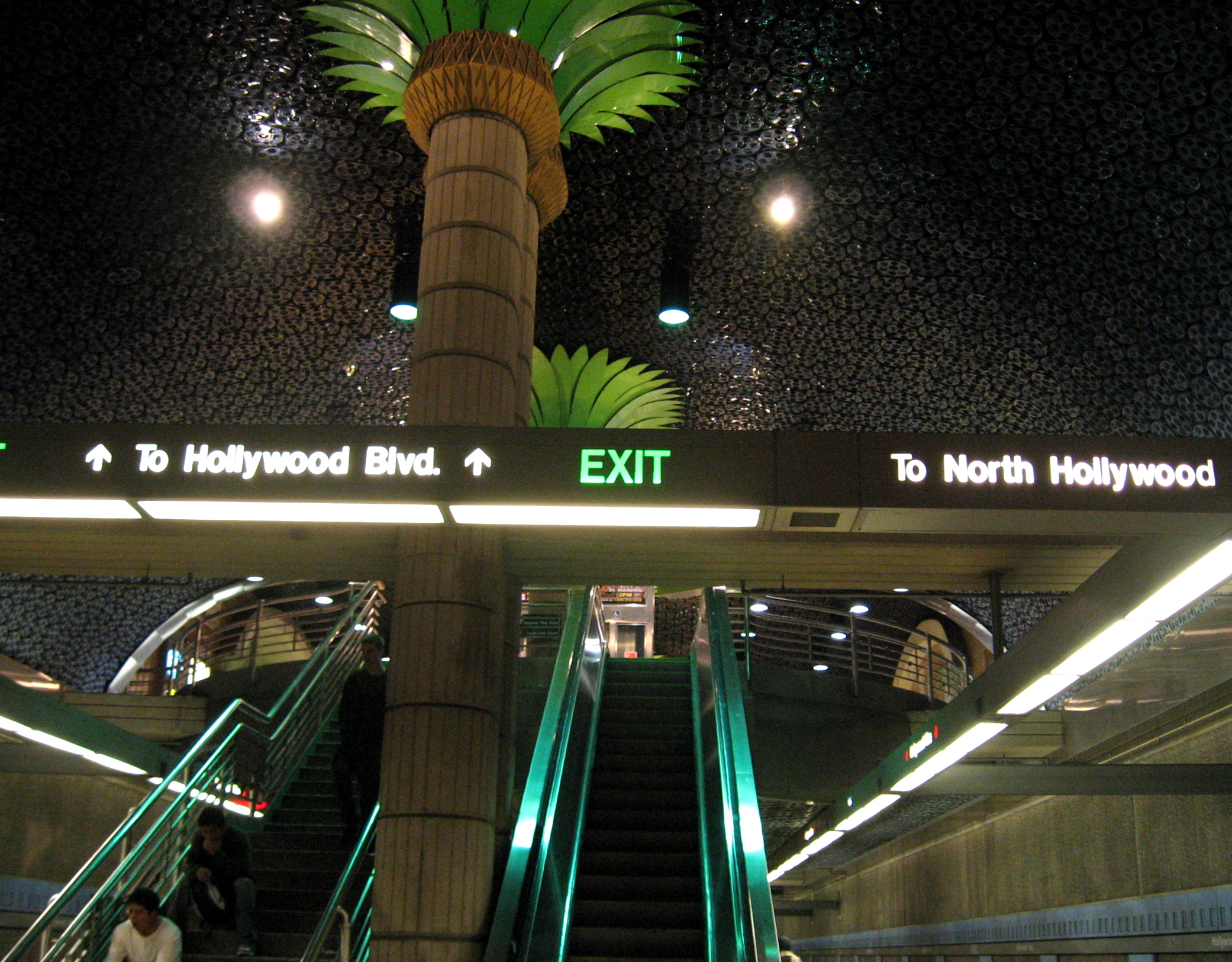
Interior decor of Hollywood/Vine station

The current B Line is the product of a long-term plan to connect Downtown Los Angeles to central and western portions of the city with a subway system. Original proposals in the 1980s had it running down Wilshire Boulevard to Fairfax Avenue and then north to the San Fernando Valley. Residents in some parts of the city bitterly opposed the subway. A 1985 methane explosion at a Ross Dress for Less clothing store near Fairfax gave Rep. Henry Waxman, who represented the Fairfax District, a reason to derail the project that was opposed by his constituents by prohibiting tunnelling in an alleged "methane zone" west of Western on Wilshire. After some political wrangling, a new route was chosen up Vermont Avenue to Hollywood Boulevard.

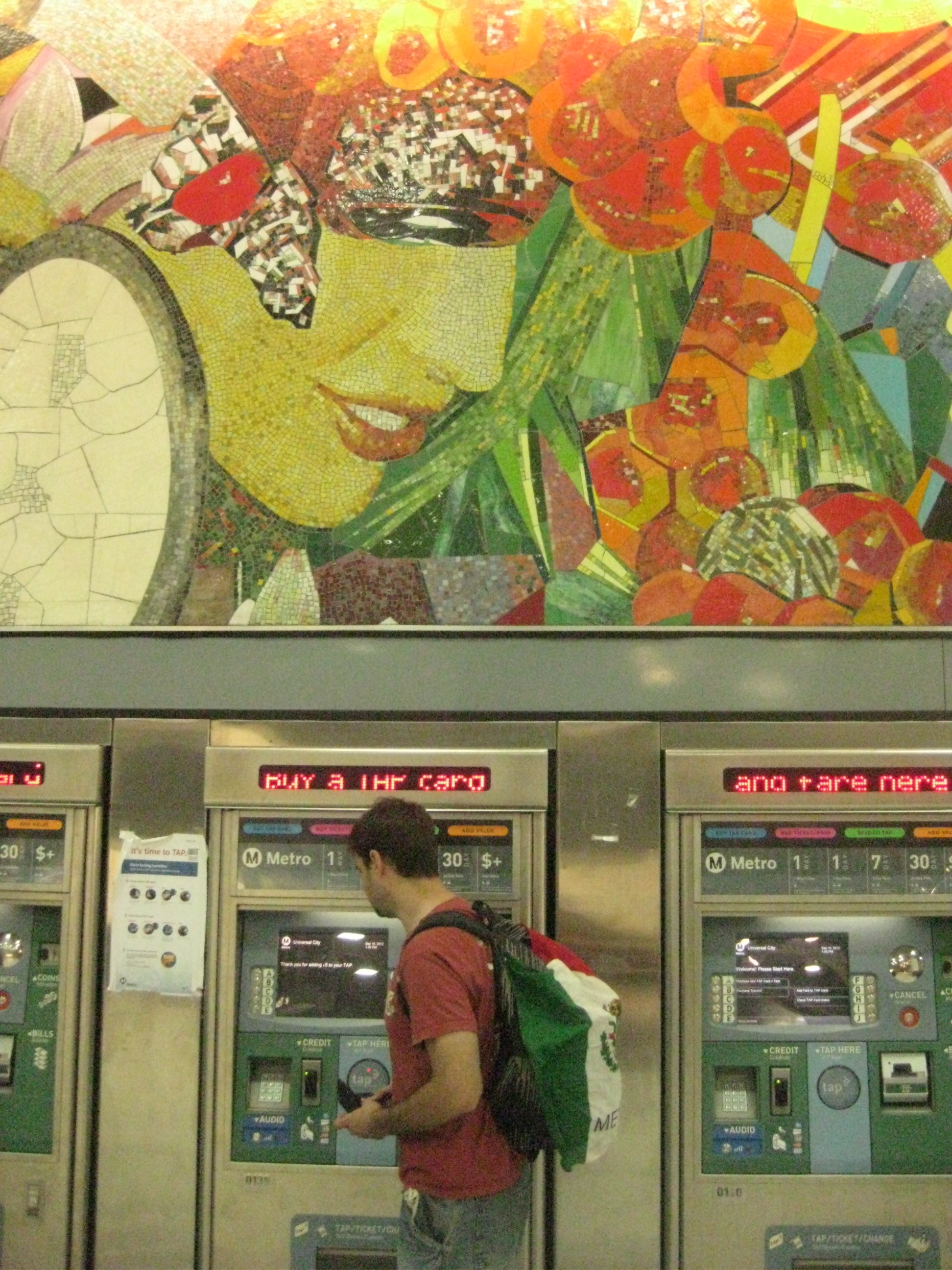
Mosaic and ticket machines at Universal City/Studio City station

The groundbreaking for the first segment of the subway was held on September 29, 1986, on the site of the future Civic Center/Grand Park station. Today's B Line was built in four minimum operating segments:

- MOS-1, consisting of five stations from Union Station to Westlake/MacArthur Park, opened on January 30, 1993, as the Red Line. (At this point, the line's operator was still the Southern California Rapid Transit District).
- MOS-2A, consisting of three stations from Westlake/MacArthur Park to Wilshire/Western, opened on July 13, 1996, although only one station on this section (Wilshire/Vermont) is on today's B Line.
- MOS-2B, consisting of five stations from Wilshire/Vermont to Hollywood/Vine, opened on June 12, 1999.
- MOS-3, extending the Red Line from Hollywood/Vine to North Hollywood, opened on June 24, 2000.

Overall, the construction of the subway over the four phases cost $4.5 billion.

On June 22, 1995, during the construction of MOS-2B, a sinkhole appeared on Hollywood Boulevard, barely missing several workers and causing damage to buildings on the street. Subway construction was delayed during the investigation and repairs of the sinkhole. The contractor on that segment project was replaced, and because of the perceived mismanagement of Red Line construction, in 1998 voters banned the use of existing sales taxes for subway tunnelling.

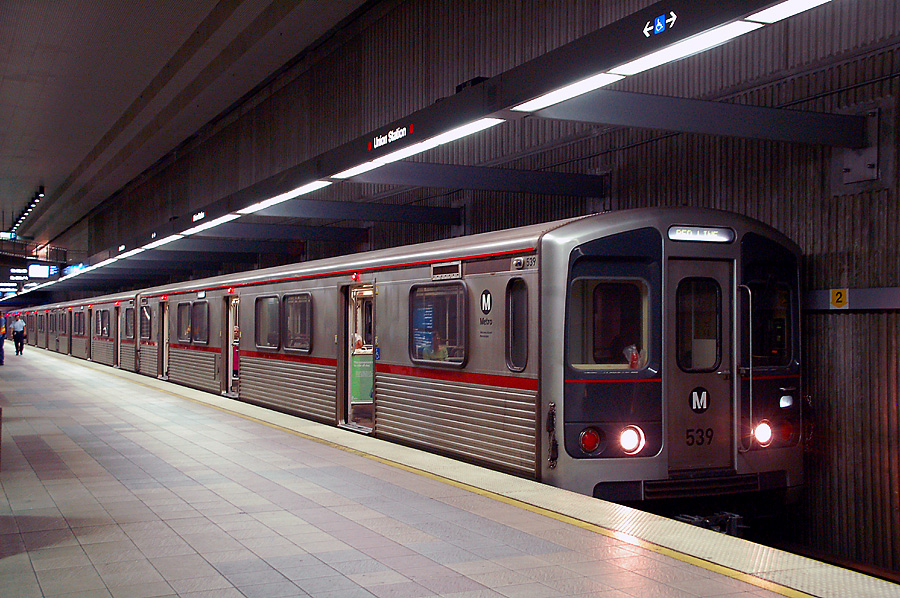
Breda A650 Metro Red Line train at Union station in 2008

Construction of MOS-3, by comparison, proceeded with relatively few issues. Tunnelling from North Hollywood for the subway started in 1995. Workers dug under the Santa Monica Mountains using tunnelling machines. Work progressed an average of 50 to 200 ft (15 to 61 m) daily, performed by work crews round-the-clock six days a week.

Original proposals for the subway system included expansions east from Union Station to East Los Angeles and west from North Hollywood towards the Warner Center transit hub in the San Fernando Valley. Barred from subway tunnelling, Metro turned to other types of mass transit. In the San Fernando Valley, residents passed a law in 1991 mandating that any rail line in the area be built underground, so Metro built a busway (now the G Line) from North Hollywood to Warner Center, which opened on October 29, 2005. East of Union Station, Metro built a light rail line with at-grade and underground segments to East Los Angeles, now part of the E Line, which opened on November 15, 2009.

In 2020, Metro renamed all of its lines using letters and colors, with the Red Line becoming the B Line (retaining the red color in its service bullet) and the Purple Line becoming the D Line.

== Operations ==
On Metro Rail's internal timetables, the B Line is called line 802.

=== Maintenance ===
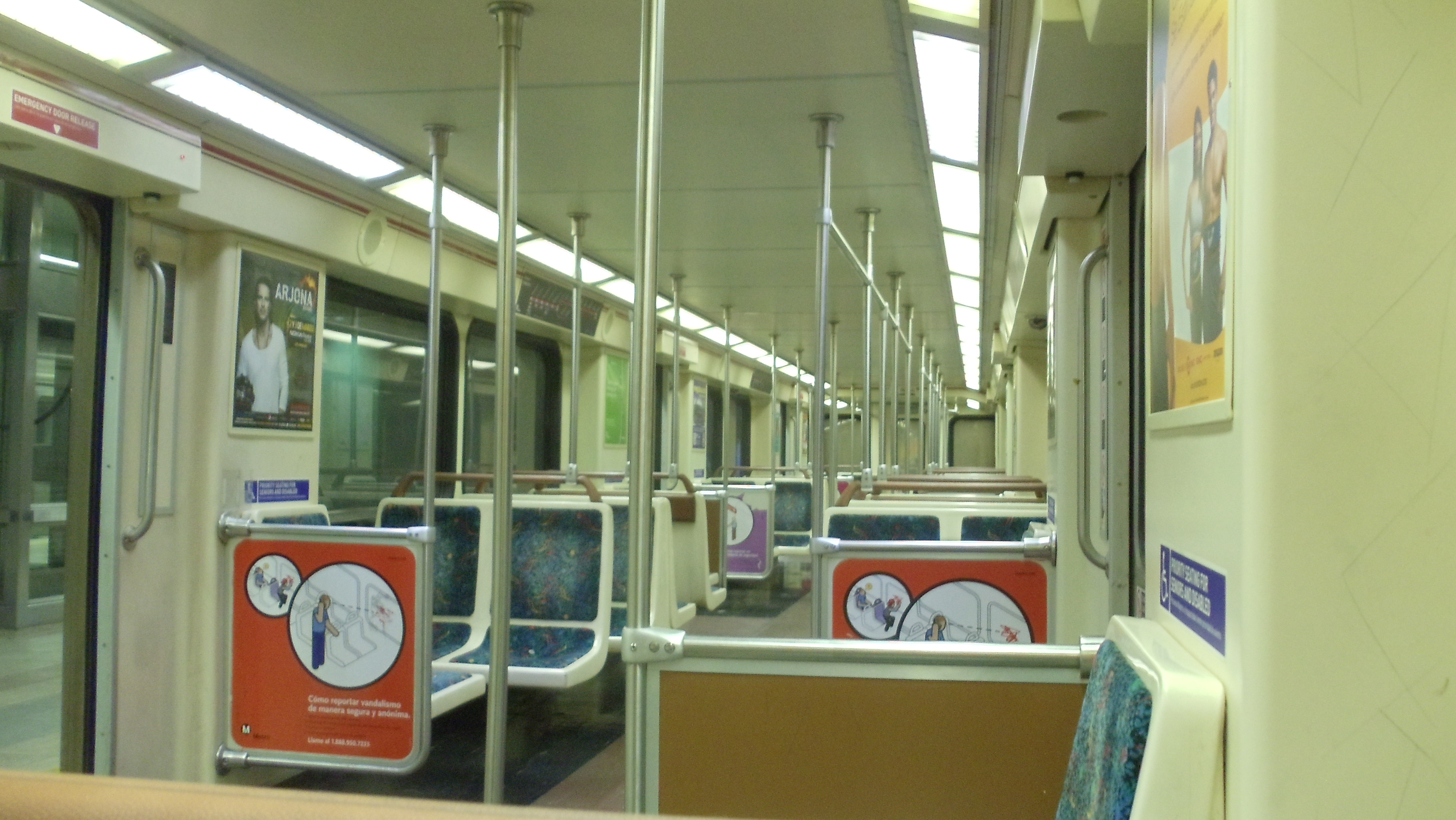
Inside a Breda A650 car used on the Metro B and D Lines

The B Line operates out of the Division 20 Yard (Santa Fe Yard), located at 320 South Santa Fe Avenue in Downtown Los Angeles. This yard stores the fleet used on the B and D Lines, and where heavy maintenance is performed. Cars reach this yard by continuing past Union Station, making a right turn and surfacing at the Eastern terminus of Ducommun Street. They then travel south to 1st Street, through a washing station, and enter the yard.

=== Rolling stock ===
The B Line uses A650 75 ft (22.86 m) electric multiple unit cars built by Breda in Italy. Trains usually run in six-car configurations during peak hours and four-car configurations otherwise. The cars are maintained in a Metro yard on Santa Fe Avenue near 4th Street alongside the Los Angeles River in downtown Los Angeles.

In March 2017, Metro ordered new CRRC HR4000 railcars, which also operates on the B Line. In January 2024, Metro ordered 182 Hyundai Rotem HR5000 trains, allowing for future replacement of all Breda A650 trains as well as expanded train service including a four minute train frequency.

== Potential future extensions ==
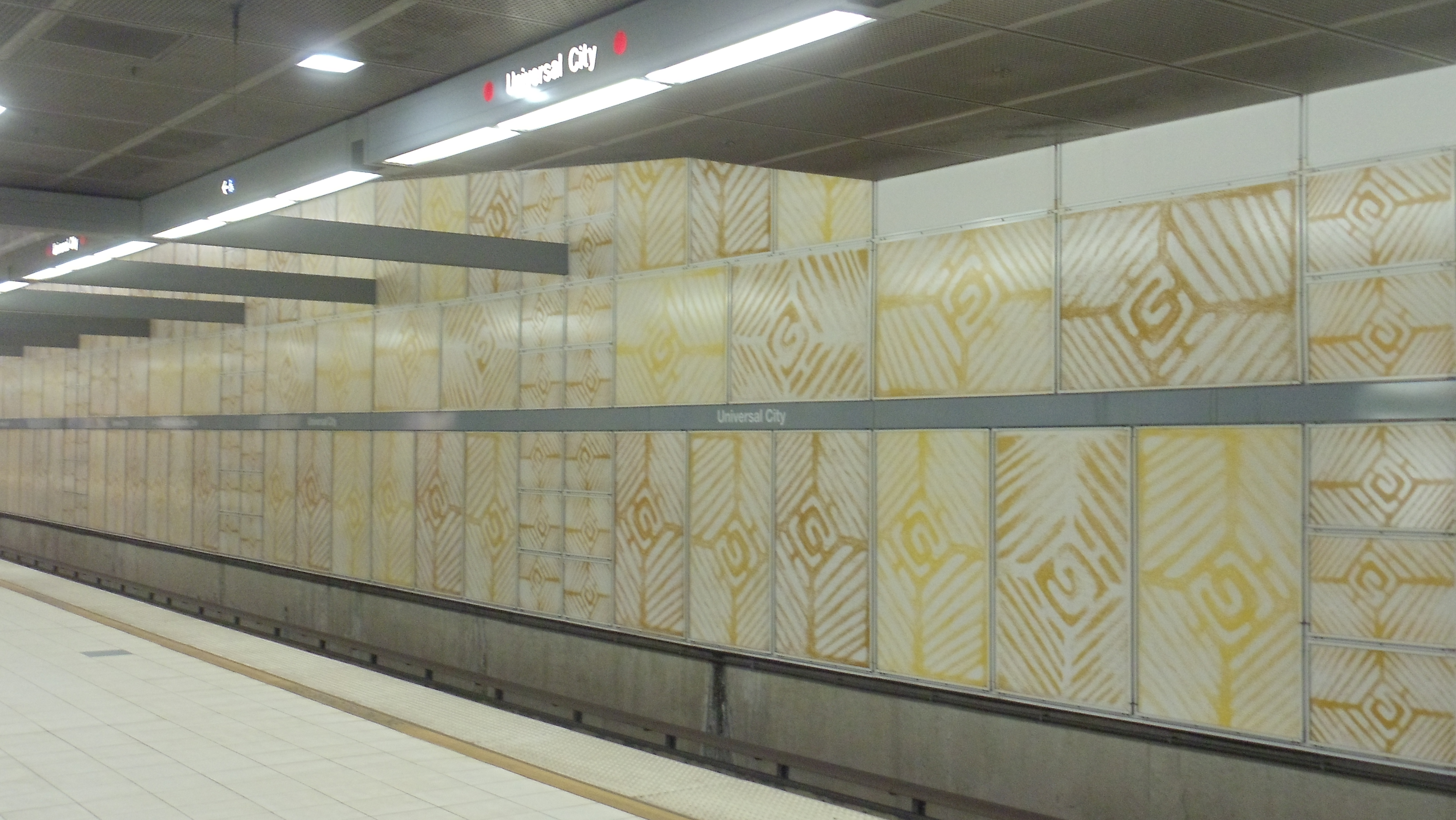
Eastbound platform at Universal City station

=== Extension to Arts District ===
In 2010, at the request of L.A. City Councilman Tom LaBonge, Metro staff studied the possibility of adding a station along the west bank of the Los Angeles River to 6th Street and Santa Fe Avenue. The study concluded that such an extension, completed at-grade along Metro-owned right-of-way, could be completed for as little as $90 million.

The study suggested an alternative station at the Division 20 Yard north of 4th Street and Santa Fe Avenue. This station would be closer to the residential population of the Arts District. As new turnback tracks will need to be built as part of the D Line Extension (to allow shorter headways), this Arts District extension could possibly be partially completed as part of the Purple Line Extension project, lowering the incremental cost of the station while increasing its usability.

=== Extensions to the South ===
One of the proposals for the Vermont Transit Corridor being considered by Metro would extend a subway line from Wilshire/Vermont station down Vermont Avenue to 120th Street. Metro is also considering other types of mass transit for the line, including light rail and busway options.

== Incidents ==
- On December 22, 2006, a rider accidentally spilled a vial of mercury on the platform at Pershing Square station. He notified the operator on a passenger intercom before boarding a train, but Los Angeles County Sheriff's Department did not know of the spillage until eight hours later. In response, Metro implemented new hazardous materials (Hazmat) training to its field employees and operators.
- On August 19, 2011, near the Hollywood/Vine station, an altercation between two passengers resulted in one being fatally stabbed. The suspect was arrested on August 24.
- On September 4, 2012, a 54-year-old man fell onto the tracks at the North Hollywood station and was hit by an oncoming train. He was rushed to hospital, where he later died.
- On May 22, 2018, an unidentified man "probably jumped" onto the tracks at the 7th St/Metro Center station and was hit by an oncoming train. He was rushed to a hospital, where he later died. It is unknown if it was suicide or not.
- On April 20, 2024, a woman in her 50s was stabbed in the throat at the Universal City station shortly after 5am. She was taken to a hospital where she died from her injuries.
