= Grier-Musser Museum =

Coordinates: 34°03′40″N 118°16′16″W

- Established: 1984
- Location: Los Angeles, California
- Type: House museum
- Website: griermussermuseum.org

The Grier-Musser Museum is a Victorian house museum located at 403 S. Bonnie Brae St. in the Westlake neighborhood of Los Angeles.

== History ==
The Grier-Musser Museum was built in 1898 in the Queen Anne style. It was converted from a rooming house to a museum in 1984 by Dr. Anna Krieger of Pennsylvania and her daughters, Susan and Nancy, who named it for Dr Krieger's mother, Anna Grier Musser. It has been a home as well as museum since the early 2000s. It displays the antique collections of three Musser family generations, including watercolor paintings, postcards, porcelain dolls, fine china, and 19th century clothing.

== In media ==
- Huell Howser visited the Grier-Musser Museum in 1994.
