= D Line (Los Angeles Metro) =

Rapid transit line in Los Angeles, California

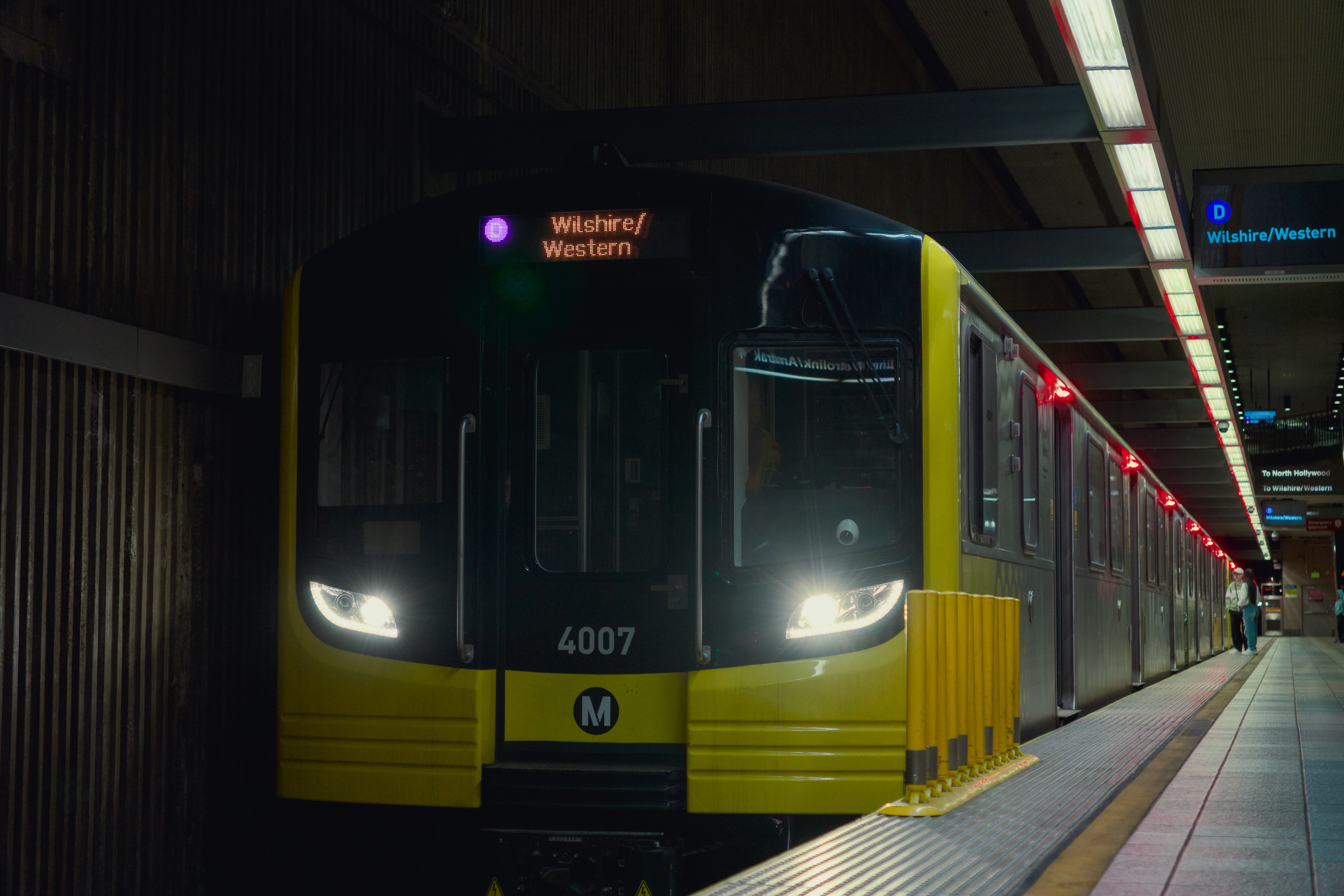
- HR4000 train awaiting departure at Union Station

Overview
- Other name(s): Red Line (1993–2006); Purple Line (2006–2020)
- Owner: Los Angeles Metro
- Line number: 805
- Termini: Wilshire/La Cienega; Union Station
- Stations: 11 (4 more under construction)
- Website: metro.net/riding/guide/d-line

Service
- Type: Rapid transit
- System: Los Angeles Metro Rail
- Depot: Division 20 (Los Angeles)
- Rolling stock: Breda A650 or CRRC HR4000 running in 4 or 6 car consists
- Ridership: 22,471,851 (Note: Ridership data is combined for the B and D lines.) (2024) ▼ -13.2%

History
- Opened: January 30, 1993; 33 years ago

Technical
- Line length: 9 miles (14 km)
- Number of tracks: 2
- Character: Fully underground (except yard)
- Track gauge: 4 ft 8 1/2 in (1,435 mm) standard gauge
- Electrification: Third rail, 750 V DC
- Operating speed: 70 mph (110 km/h) (max.); 29.5 mph (47.5 km/h) (avg.)
Route map
D Line highlighted in purple

The D Line (formerly a branch of the Red Line from 1993–2006 and independently as the Purple Line from 2006–2020) is a fully underground rapid transit line in Los Angeles, California, running for 9 miles (14 km) between Beverly Hills and Downtown Los Angeles. It is the shortest of six lines of the Los Angeles Metro Rail system, operated by Los Angeles Metro.

The D Line is one of the city's two fully underground lines (along with the B Line). The two lines share tracks between Koreatown and Downtown Los Angeles. As of 2019, the combined B and D lines averaged 133,413 boardings per weekday.

In 2020, Metro renamed all of its lines using letters and colors, with the Purple Line becoming the D Line (retaining the purple color in its service bullet) and the Red Line becoming the B Line.

Construction has been underway since 2014 for a major extension of the line. The three-station, 3.9-mile (6.3 km) Section 1 opened on May 8, 2026, while sections 2 and 3 to downtown Beverly Hills, Century City, and Westwood, both expected to open in 2027, will add four new stations and 5.2 miles (8.4 km) of track to the line.

== Service description ==
=== Route description ===
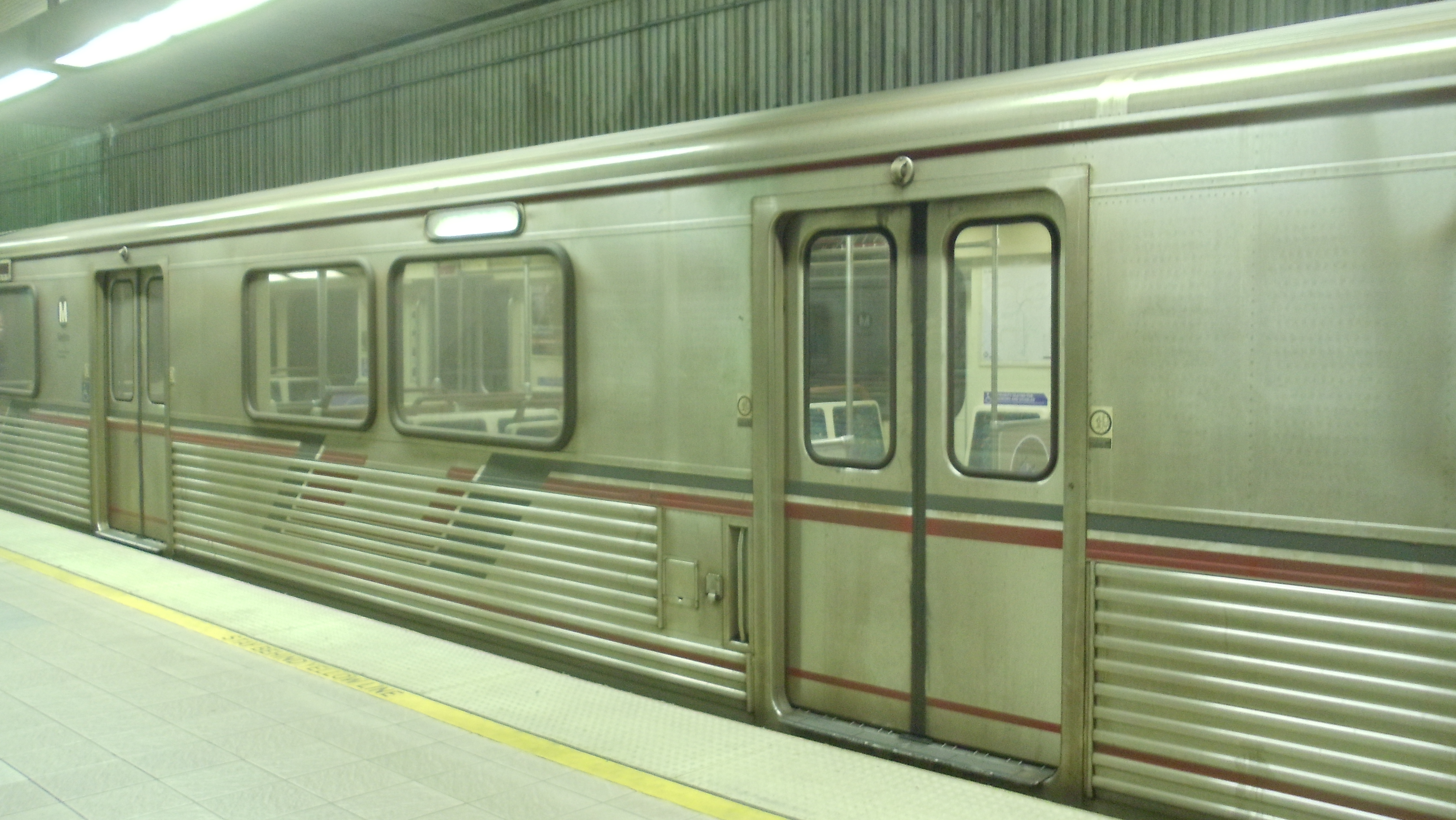
Metro D Line train at Union Station. The Metro B and D lines both end at Union Station, the eastern terminus of both lines.

The D Line is a 9-mile (14 km) line that begins at Wilshire/La Cienega station in Beverly Hills. The line continues east for 5 miles (8.0 km) to Wilshire/Vermont station, where the line merges with the B Line. The lines continue between Wilshire Boulevard and 7th Street (and briefly Ingraham Street), where the lines interchange with the A and E light rail lines at 7th Street/Metro Center station. The lines then pass northeast through Downtown Los Angeles, passing through the Financial District, Pershing Square (near the Historic Core), and the Civic Center, before terminating at Union Station.

==== Duplicate service on Wilshire ====
The D Line runs below Wilshire Boulevard, which is served on the surface by the Metro Local Route 20 and Metro Rapid Route 720 bus lines. Despite the same service, Metro considers the bus service justified because both routes frequently run from Downtown Los Angeles. Unlike the D Line, which is still under construction, these bus routes run along the entire Wilshire corridor, west to Beverly Hills, Westwood, and Santa Monica.

=== Hours and frequency ===
D Line trains run every day between approximately 5 a.m. and midnight. Trains operate every 10 minutes during peak hours. Early morning and night service is approximately every 20 minutes.

Time	5am	6am	7am	8am–6pm	7pm	8pm	9pm–12am
Weekdays	16–20 min	10 min					20 min
Weekends/Holidays	20 min			10 min		20 min	

=== Station listing ===
The following table lists the stations (including the four future stations) of the D Line, from west to east:

Station	Date opened	City/Neighborhood	Major connections and notes
Westwood/VA Hospital	2027	West LA VA Soldiers Home (unincorporated)	
Westwood/UCLA	2027	Westwood	Future connection to the Sepulveda Transit Corridor
Century City	2027	Century City	
Beverly Drive	2027	Beverly Hills	
Wilshire/La Cienega	May 8, 2026	Beverly Hills	
Wilshire/Fairfax	May 8, 2026	Miracle Mile	Future connection to
Wilshire/La Brea	May 8, 2026	Miracle Mile	
Wilshire/Western	July 13, 1996	Koreatown	
Wilshire/Normandie	July 13, 1996	Koreatown	
Wilshire/Vermont	July 13, 1996	Koreatown	B Line
Westlake/MacArthur Park	January 30, 1993	Westlake	Park and ride: 100 spaces
7th Street/Metro Center	January 30, 1993	Downtown Los Angeles	A Line B Line E Line J Line
Pershing Square	January 30, 1993	Downtown Los Angeles	B Line J Line
Civic Center/Grand Park	January 30, 1993	Downtown Los Angeles	B Line J Line
Union Station	January 30, 1993	Downtown Los Angeles	Amtrak; LAX FlyAway; Metrolink; Paid parking: 2,189 spaces

=== Ridership ===
Prior to the 2026 opening of Section 1 of the D Line Extension, the line was mainly used as a downtown shuttle on its shared segment with the B Line. The remainder of the line, then consisting of a one-mile stub between Wilshire/Vermont and Wilshire/Western, had operated at a peak utilization of 11% in 2010, with ridership on stub stations lagging behind that of the B Line's non-shared stations.

== History ==
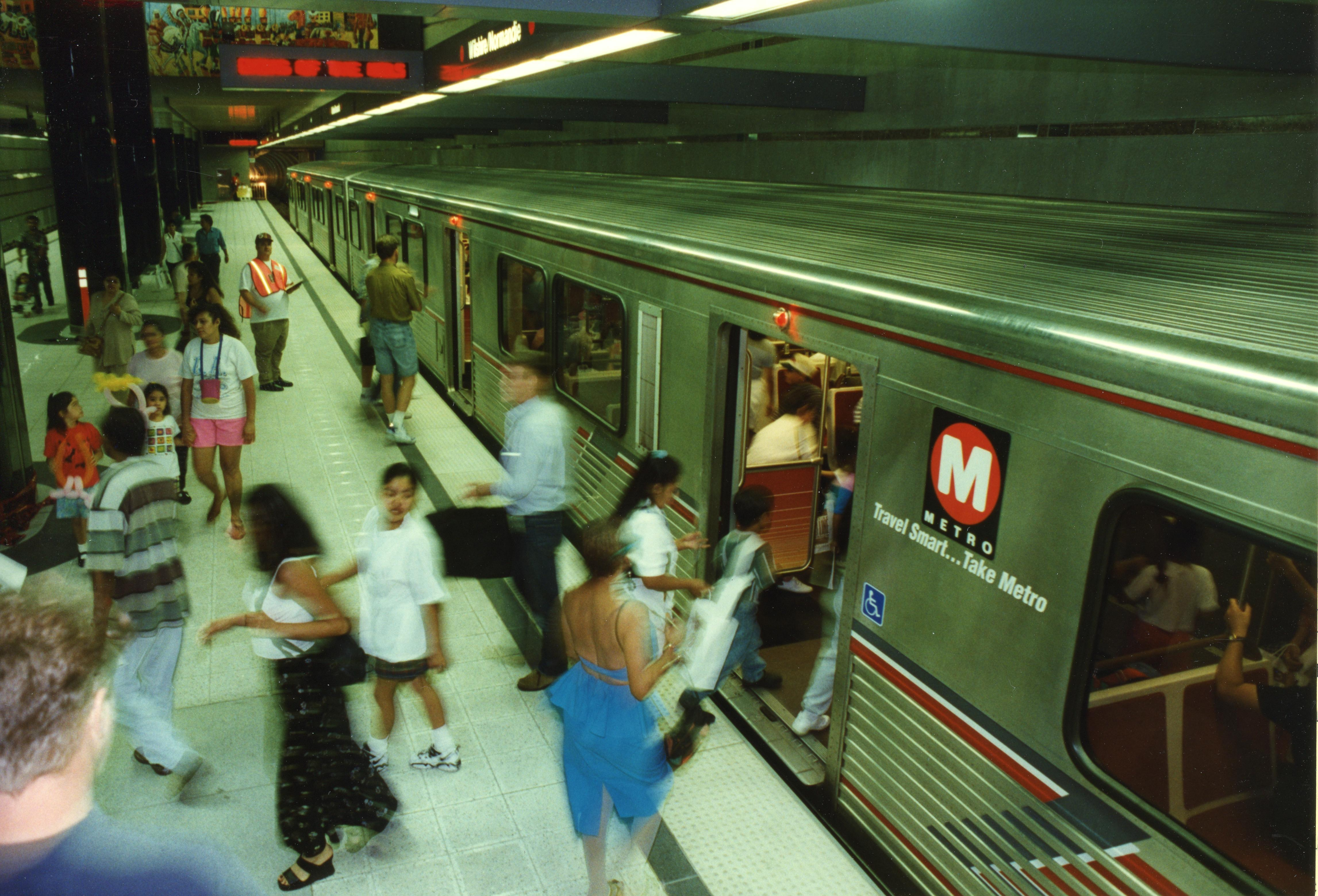
Wilshire/Normandie station on the opening day of the extension, July 13, 1996

The current D Line is the product of a long-term plan to connect Downtown Los Angeles to central and western portions of the city with a subway system. Original proposals in the 1980s had the subway line running down Wilshire Boulevard to Fairfax Avenue and then north to the San Fernando Valley. Residents in some parts of the city bitterly opposed the subway. On March 24, 1985, a methane explosion near the proposed subway route in Fairfax destroyed a Ross Dress for Less clothing store. The potential for other explosions in the former oil fields near Wilshire was used as justification for further opposition to the subway project. A proposal to halt federal funding for the Wilshire project from congressman Henry Waxman, who represented the Fairfax District, was passed by Congress in 1986.

The groundbreaking for the first segment of the subway was held on September 29, 1986, on the site of the future Civic Center/Grand Park station. The pre-2026 D Line was built in two minimum operating segments:

- MOS-1, which consisted of the original five stations from Union Station to Westlake/MacArthur Park, opened on January 30, 1993.
- MOS-2A, including three new stations between Westlake/MacArthur Park and Wilshire/Western, opened on July 13, 1996.

The Hollywood branch (MOS-2B) began service in 1999. Initially, both branches were designated as part of the Red Line, but in 2006 trains traveling between Union Station and Wilshire/Western were rebranded to the Purple Line (changed to D Line in 2020) for greater clarity.

In 2005, after advances in tunneling technology—specifically "earth pressure balance" boring machines—Waxman worked with Mayor Antonio Villaraigosa to convene an independent peer review panel of tunneling experts. The panel concluded in November 2005 that tunneling along Wilshire could be done safely. A bill to repeal the original ban was introduced by Waxman and passed by the House on February 7, 2007. It was signed into law in December 2007 as part of the 2008 omnibus spending bill.

== Future expansion ==
=== Extension to Westwood ===
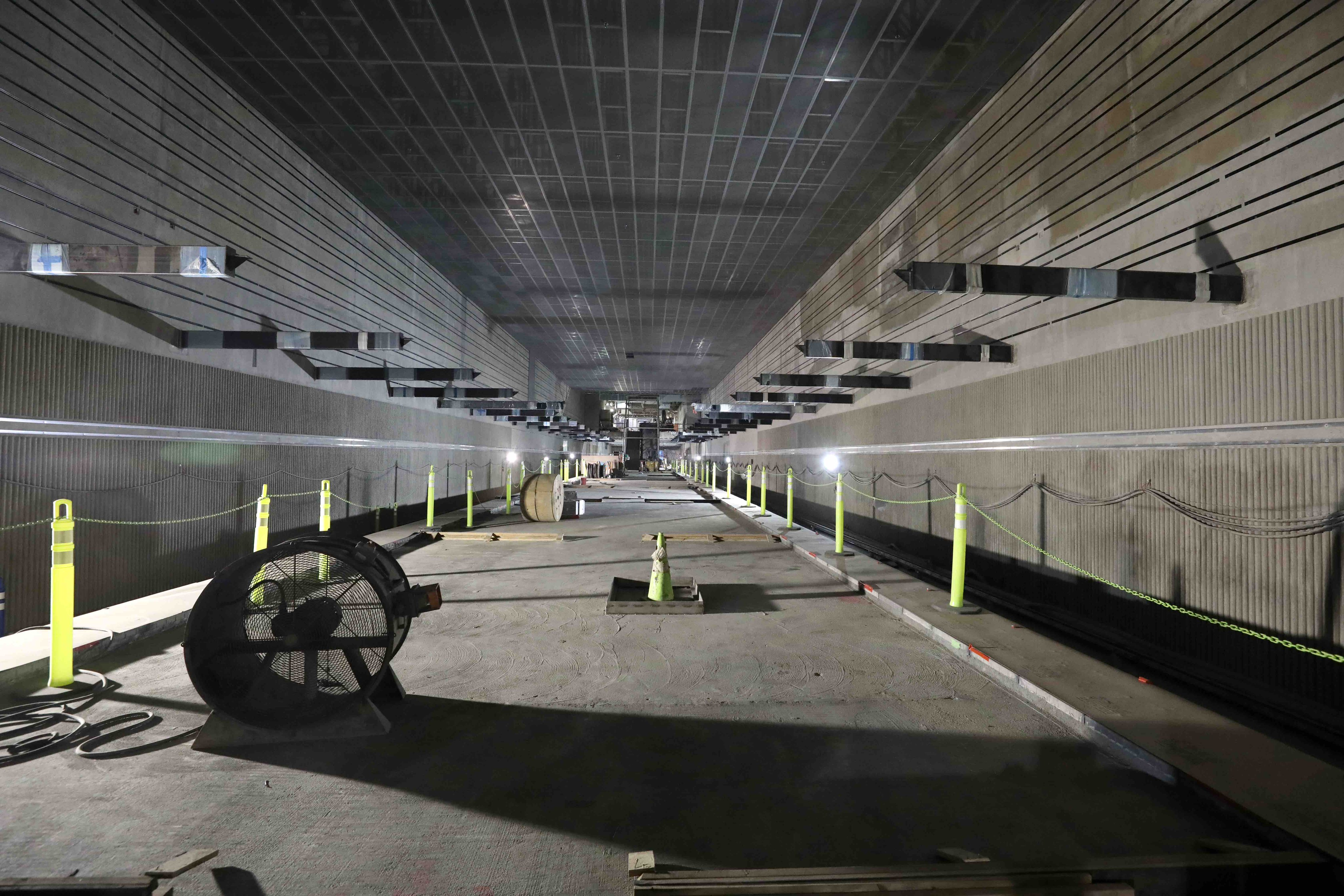
Wilshire/La Brea station under construction in November 2023

Metro is constructing a major extension of the D Line to Beverly Hills, Century City, and Westwood. The new project is called the D Line Extension (formerly the Westside Subway Extension), and Section 1 broke ground on November 7, 2014. Metro released the final environmental impact report (FEIR) on March 19, 2012, and Section 1 of the project (to Wilshire/La Cienega station) was approved by Metro's Board of Directors on April 26, 2012. Notice to proceed was issued to Tutor Perini on April 26, 2017 for Section 2 from Wilshire/La Cienega station to Century City station.

In Beverly Hills, there was public opposition to the D Line Extension, led by school board president Lisa Korbatov. The opposition existed because of the subway tunnel's route beneath Beverly Hills High School, and Korbatov and Beverly Hills residents were concerned about student safety issues allegedly posed by such a tunnel. Korbatov gathered around 5,300 signed petitions to send to U.S. President Donald Trump, urging him and Transportation Secretary Elaine Chao to withhold federal funding from the project. Metro ultimately won in court, but Korbatov and the school district sued in state and federal court over environmental concerns for the project. Tunneling eventually completed in Beverly Hills in early 2022 with no issues underneath the high school.

Construction is currently underway for the extension, which is expected to open in three sections between 2026 and 2027. Section 1 from Wilshire/Western station to Wilshire/La Cienega station opened on May 8, 2026 to much fanfare.

=== Proposed Arts District station ===
Metro officials have proposed extending service on the eastern side of the D Line, allowing subway cars to continue past Union Station to service the Arts District neighborhood east of Downtown Los Angeles. D Line trains pass through Union Station, exit through a portal at Ducommun Street, and stop in the Arts District when they go to and from the Division 20 yard for maintenance and storage. Proposals have included either one station at 6th Street or two stations, with the second one at 1st Street. In 2018, the Metro board approved a $500,000 expense to undertake pre-design activities, prepare an Environmental Impact Report and conduct public engagement for a potential station at 6th Street. However, it is unclear whether Metro can raise the millions of dollars of funding needed to build the proposed station. One possible solution is a new tax district implemented by the City of Los Angeles that would tax a portion of property value increases in the downtown area and transfer those funds to Metro to help build the station. A draft environmental impact report for the extension and station at 6th Street was undertaken beginning in March 2021.

== Operations ==
On Metro Rail's internal timetables, the D Line is called line 805.

=== Maintenance ===
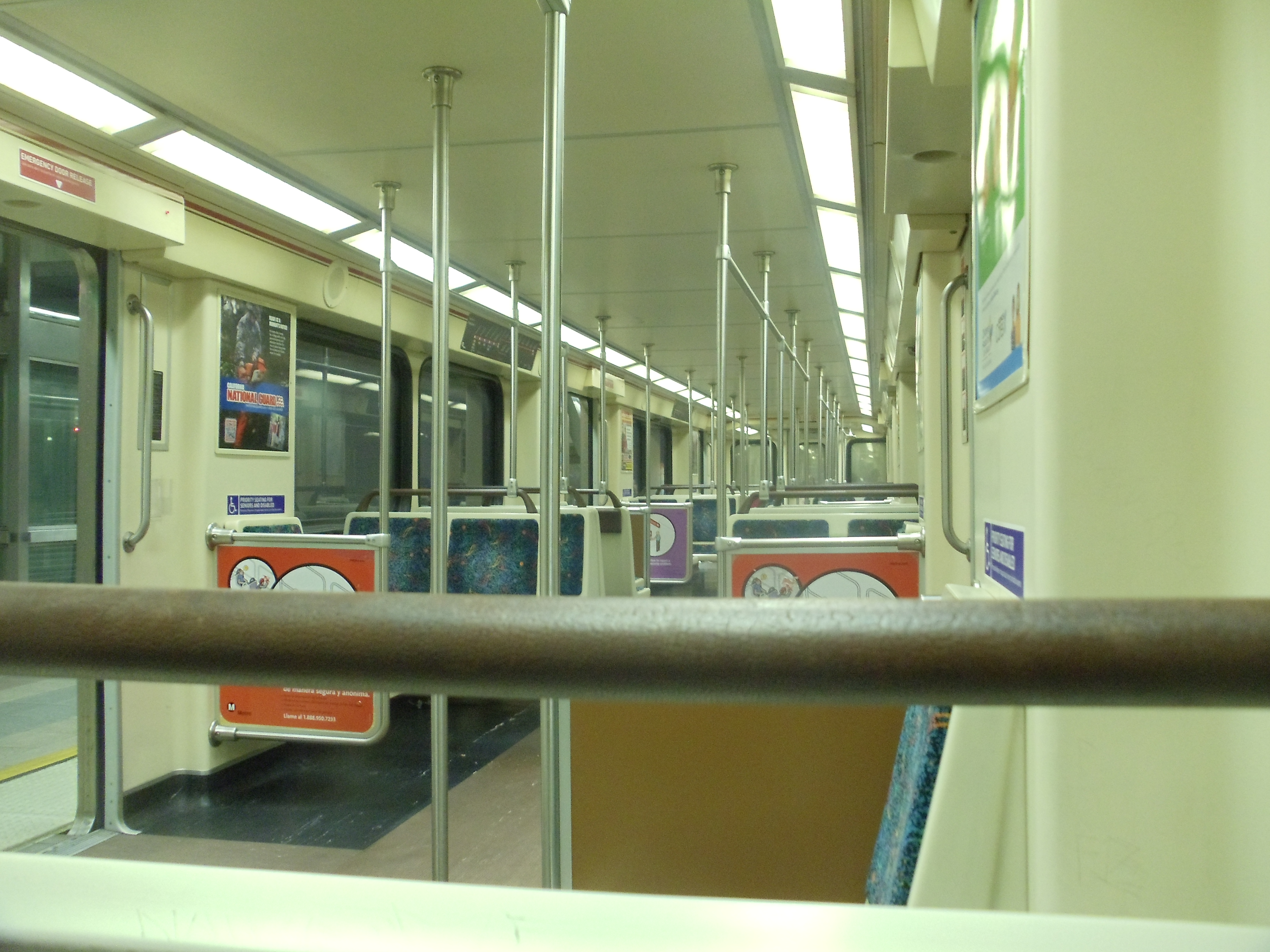
Inside train fleet number #530 on the Metro D Line

The D Line operates from the Division 20 Yard (Santa Fe Yard) located in the Arts District at 320 South Santa Fe Avenue, Los Angeles. This yard stores train cars and equipment used on the B and D Lines. It is also where heavy maintenance is performed on the fleet. Subway trains access this yard by continuing eastward after ending their revenue service at Union Station, exiting tunnels through a portal at Ducommun Street, and then traveling south to the yard's entrance at 1st Street.

=== Rolling stock ===
The D Line uses A650 75-foot (23 m) electric multiple unit cars built by Breda in Italy; these trains are based on similar vehicles that were built by the Budd Company for the Baltimore and Miami rapid transit systems between 1983 and 1986. Trains usually run in four-car during peak hours and two-car outside of peak hours. The cars are maintained in a Metro yard on Santa Fe Drive near 4th Street alongside the Los Angeles River in Downtown Los Angeles.

In March 2017, Metro ordered 64 CRRC HR4000 railcars, some of which will operate on the D Line when the D Line Extension is completed. In January 2024, Metro ordered 182 Hyundai Rotem HR5000 trains, allowing for future replacement of all Breda A650 trains, expanded train service including a four minute train frequency, and extensions of the D Line over three phases. The first HR4000 train began revenue service on the D Line on December 20, 2024, due to testing on Phase 1 of the D Line Extension.

== See also ==
- Ride the D - 2026 advertisement campaign and slogan for the D line
